= Limburg (Chamber of Representatives constituency) =

Parliamentary constituency in Belgium

- Limbourg
- Constituency for the Chamber of Representatives
- Location of Limburg within Belgium
- Province: Limburg
- Region: Flanders
- Population: 904,919 (2025)
- Electorate: 659,619 (2024)
- Area: 2,427 km^{2} (2024)

Current Constituency
- Created: 1995
- Seats: List: 12 (2003–present); 11 (1995–2003)
- Members: List: Steven Coenegrachts (Open Vld); Kim De Witte (PVDA); Nawal Farih (CD&V); Frieda Gijbels (NV-A); Dieter Keuten (VB); Steven Matheï (CD&V); Funda Oru (Vooruit); Annick Ponthier (VB); Wouter Raskin (NV-A); Frank Troosters (VB); Steven Vandeput (NV-A); Alain Yzermans (Vooruit)
- Created from: List: Hasselt; Tongeren-Maaseik

Limburg (French: Limbourg) is one of the 11 multi-member constituencies of the Chamber of Representatives, the lower house of the Belgian Federal Parliament, the national legislature of Belgium. The constituency was established as Hasselt-Tongeren-Maaseik (French: Hasselt-Tongres-Maaseik) in 1995 following the fourth Belgian state reform. It was renamed Limburg in 2003 following the re-organisation of constituencies across Belgium along provincial lines. It is conterminous with the province of Limburg. The constituency currently elects 12 of the 150 members of the Chamber of Representatives using the open party-list proportional representation electoral system. At the 2024 federal election the constituency had 659,619 registered electors.

== Electoral system ==
Limburg currently elects 12 of the 150 members of the Chamber of Representatives using the open party-list proportional representation electoral system. Seats are allocated using the D'Hondt method. Since 2003 only parties that reach the 5% threshold in the constituency compete for seats.

Electors may vote for the list (party) or for individual candidates, either main candidates or substitute candidates or a combination, on the list. They may vote for as many candidates as there are seats in the constituency. Split-ticket voting (panachage) is not permitted and will result in the ballot paper being invalidated. The minimum number of votes a candidate must obtain to get elected - the quotient - is calculated as the total votes received by the party divided by the number of seats in the constituency plus one. Half the ballot papers where there are no votes for main candidates (i.e. the elector has voted for the list or for substitute candidates only) are redistributed amongst main candidates in the order they appear on the ballot paper so that the candidate's total votes (personal votes plus redistributed votes) equals the quotient. The seats won by the party are then allocated to the candidates with the most number of total votes.

== Election results ==
=== Summary ===
Election	Workers PVDA			Groen Groen / Agalev			Vooruit Vooruit / SP.A / SP.A-Spirit / SP			Liberals & Democrats Open Vld / VLD			Christian Democrats CD&V / CVP			New Flemish N-VA / CD&V-N-VA / VU-ID / VU			Vlaams Belang VB / VB		
Election	Votes	%	Seats	Votes	%	Seats	Votes	%	Seats	Votes	%	Seats	Votes	%	Seats	Votes	%	Seats	Votes	%	Seats
2024	52,303	9.07%	1	27,619	4.79%	0	75,191	13.04%	2	40,985	7.11%	1	90,715	15.73%	2	136,606	23.68%	3	141,988	24.62%	3
2019	31,037	5.59%	0	38,154	6.88%	1	76,614	13.81%	2	66,602	12.00%	1	103,625	18.68%	2	125,273	22.58%	3	109,499	19.74%	3
2014	14,253	2.57%	0	33,244	6.00%	0	98,194	17.71%	2	68,713	12.39%	2	125,962	22.72%	3	174,030	31.39%	5	34,020	6.14%	0
2010	8,644	1.62%	0	25,754	4.81%	0	97,011	18.14%	2	64,741	12.10%	1	100,643	18.81%	3	154,230	28.83%	4	68,413	12.79%	2
2007	5,800	1.07%	0	22,289	4.10%	0	109,994	20.24%	3	99,860	18.38%	2				177,345	32.64%	5	100,301	18.46%	2
2003	3,332	0.62%	0	12,761	2.39%	0	174,864	32.68%	4	113,440	21.20%	3	116,367	21.75%	3	22,826	4.27%	0	83,756	15.65%	2
1999	3,586	0.72%	0	49,985	10.00%	1	94,404	18.89%	2	111,016	22.22%	3	118,263	23.67%	3	46,307	9.27%	1	63,374	12.68%	1
1995	3,476	0.73%	0	26,858	5.66%	0	108,228	22.81%	3	98,518	20.76%	2	142,842	30.10%	4	37,627	7.93%	1	46,130	9.72%	1

(Figures in italics represent alliances.)

=== Detailed ===
==== 2020s ====
===== 2024 =====
Results of the 2024 federal election held on 9 June 2024:

Party		Votes per arrondissement				Total votes	%	Seats
Party		Hasselt	Maas- eik	Tong- eren	Expat- riates	Total votes	%	Seats
Vlaams Belang	VB	64,813	42,165	34,210	800	141,988	24.62%	3
New Flemish Alliance	N-VA	70,003	36,655	29,204	744	136,606	23.68%	3
Christian Democratic and Flemish	CD&V	39,648	31,296	19,323	448	90,715	15.73%	2
Vooruit	Vooruit	40,873	18,551	15,259	508	75,191	13.04%	2
Workers' Party of Belgium	PVDA	29,730	12,017	10,238	318	52,303	9.07%	1
Open Flemish Liberals and Democrats	Open Vld	17,754	8,518	14,119	594	40,985	7.11%	1
Groen	Groen	15,012	6,344	5,471	792	27,619	4.79%	0
For You	VU	3,255	1,222	972	56	5,505	0.95%	0
Blank Party	PB	2,414	1,096	1,080	70	4,660	0.81%	0
Belgische Unie – Union Belge	BUB	581	283	311	27	1,202	0.21%	0
Valid votes		284,083	158,147	130,187	4,357	576,774	100.00%	12
Rejected votes		13,768	8,180	7,020	352	29,320	4.84%	
Total polled		297,851	166,327	137,207	4,709	606,094	91.89%	
Registered electors		323,991	178,848	148,049	8,731	659,619		
Turnout		91.93%	93.00%	92.68%	53.93%	91.89%		

The following candidates were elected: Steven Coenegrachts (Open Vld), 10,120 votes; Kim De Witte (PVDA), 13,262 votes; Nawal Farih (CD&V), 22,523 votes; Frieda Gijbels (N-VA), 20,581 votes; Dieter Keuten (VB), 10,721 votes; Steven Matheï (CD&V), 11,733 votes; Funda Oru (Vooruit), 14,334 votes; Annick Ponthier (VB), 34,830 votes; Wouter Raskin (N-VA), 13,764 votes; Frank Troosters (VB), 13,728 votes; Steven Vandeput (N-VA), 34,045 votes; and Alain Yzermans (Vooruit), 10,755 votes.

==== 2010s ====
===== 2019 =====
Results of the 2019 federal election held on 26 May 2019:

Party		Votes per arrondissement				Total votes	%	Seats
Party		Hasselt	Maas- eik	Tong- eren	Expat- riates	Total votes	%	Seats
New Flemish Alliance	N-VA	65,632	33,749	25,793	99	125,273	22.58%	3
Vlaams Belang	VB	51,477	32,662	25,299	61	109,499	19.74%	3
Christian Democratic and Flemish	CD&V	46,143	33,967	23,431	84	103,625	18.68%	2
Socialist Party Different	SP.A	41,793	16,618	18,138	65	76,614	13.81%	2
Open Flemish Liberals and Democrats	Open Vld	29,416	17,658	19,425	103	66,602	12.00%	1
Groen	Groen	20,889	9,561	7,579	125	38,154	6.88%	1
Workers' Party of Belgium	PVDA	16,803	8,245	5,969	20	31,037	5.59%	0
Democratic Solidarity Appeal	D-SA	1,671	382	284	7	2,344	0.42%	0
PRO The Citizens' Lobby	PRO	900	498	289	3	1,690	0.30%	0
Valid votes		274,724	153,340	126,207	567	554,838	100.00%	12
Rejected votes		15,715	9,774	7,899	35	33,423	5.68%	
Total polled		290,439	163,114	134,106	602	588,261	90.99%	
Registered electors		322,304	177,780	145,633	786	646,503		
Turnout		90.11%	91.75%	92.08%	76.59%	90.99%		

The following candidates were elected: Wouter Beke (CD&V), 46,940 votes; Barbara Creemers (Groen), 8,070 votes; Zuhal Demir (N-VA), 61,444 votes; Patrick Dewael (Open Vld), 25,070 votes; Nawal Farih (CD&V), 12,323 votes; Frieda Gijbels (N-VA), 14,722 votes; Erik Gilissen (VB), 9,733 votes; Meryame Kitir (SP.A), 31,816 votes; Annick Ponthier (VB), 27,492 votes; Wouter Raskin (N-VA), 14,734 votes; Frank Troosters (VB), 11,618 votes; and Kris Verduyckt (SP.A), 8,926 votes.

Substitutions:

- Zuhal Demir (N-VA) was appointed to the Flemish Government and was substituted by Joy Donné (N-VA) between 3 October 2019 and 30 June 2022; and by Mieke Claes (N-VA) from 30 June 2022.

===== 2014 =====
Results of the 2014 federal election held on 25 May 2014:

Party		Votes per arrondissement				Total votes	%	Seats
Party		Hasselt	Maas- eik	Tong- eren	Expat- riates	Total votes	%	Seats
New Flemish Alliance	N-VA	89,835	47,300	36,794	101	174,030	31.39%	5
Christian Democratic and Flemish	CD&V	58,328	37,855	29,704	75	125,962	22.72%	3
Socialist Party Different	SP.A	53,035	23,404	21,696	59	98,194	17.71%	2
Open Flemish Liberals and Democrats	Open Vld	29,810	17,062	21,757	84	68,713	12.39%	2
Vlaams Belang	VB	17,299	8,955	7,743	23	34,020	6.14%	0
Groen	Groen	17,712	8,221	7,260	51	33,244	6.00%	0
Workers' Party of Belgium	PVDA	8,087	3,626	2,529	11	14,253	2.57%	0
Pirate Party		2,188	860	856	5	3,909	0.71%	0
ROSSEM		783	343	286	3	1,415	0.26%	0
Belgische Unie – Union Belge	BUB	350	178	183	3	714	0.13%	0
Valid votes		277,427	147,804	128,808	415	554,454	100.00%	12
Rejected votes		15,842	9,595	8,241	26	33,704	5.73%	
Total polled		293,269	157,399	137,049	441	588,158	92.66%	
Registered electors		317,989	167,965	148,217	563	634,734		
Turnout		92.23%	93.71%	92.47%	78.33%	92.66%		

The following candidates were elected: Wouter Beke (CD&V), 59,291 votes; Patrick Dewael (Open Vld), 27,155 votes; Karolien Grosemans (N-VA), 25,400 votes; Veerle Heeren (CD&V), 25,317 votes; Werner Janssen (N-VA), 13,532 votes; Meryame Kitir (SP.A), 17,723 votes; Nele Lijnen (Open Vld), 14,154 votes; Peter Luykx (N-VA), 16,686 votes; Raf Terwingen (CD&V), 26,838 votes; Steven Vandeput (N-VA), 41,211 votes; Peter Vanvelthoven (SP.A), 36,934 votes; and Veerle Wouters (N-VA), 18,012 votes.

Substitutions:

- Steven Vandeput (N-VA) was appointed to the federal government and was substituted by Wouter Raskin (N-VA) on 14 October 2014.

===== 2010 =====
Results of the 2010 federal election held on 13 June 2010:

Party		Votes per arrondissement				Total votes	%	Seats
Party		Hasselt	Maas- eik	Tong- eren	Expat- riates	Total votes	%	Seats
New Flemish Alliance	N-VA	79,685	42,065	32,403	77	154,230	28.83%	4
Christian Democratic and Flemish	CD&V	46,160	31,490	22,942	51	100,643	18.81%	3
Socialist Party Different	SP.A	52,772	22,861	21,325	53	97,011	18.14%	2
Vlaams Belang	VB	34,798	18,402	15,204	9	68,413	12.79%	2
Open Flemish Liberals and Democrats	Open Vld	27,644	15,551	21,479	67	64,741	12.10%	1
Groen	Groen	14,220	6,225	5,266	43	25,754	4.81%	0
List Dedecker	LDD	8,512	3,781	3,178	3	15,474	2.89%	0
Workers' Party of Belgium	PVDA	4,734	2,284	1,620	6	8,644	1.62%	0
Valid votes		268,525	142,659	123,417	309	534,910	100.00%	12
Rejected votes		16,377	10,584	8,242	31	35,234	6.18%	
Total polled		284,902	153,243	131,659	340	570,144	92.55%	
Registered electors		309,444	163,757	142,439	369	616,009		
Turnout		92.07%	93.58%	92.43%	92.14%	92.55%		

The following candidates were elected: Ivo Belet (CD&V), 25,874 votes; Frieda Brepoels (N-VA), 43,729 votes; Patrick Dewael (Open Vld), 24,497 votes; Karolien Grosemans (N-VA), 16,949 votes; Ingrid Lieten (SP.A), 23,205 votes; Jan Peumans (N-VA), 31,180 votes; Annick Ponthier (VB), 7,682 votes; Bert Schoofs (VB), 18,726 votes; Raf Terwingen (CD&V), 32,009 votes; Steven Vandeput (N-VA), 13,373 votes; Liesbeth Van der Auwera (CD&V), 17,939 votes; and Peter Vanvelthoven (SP.A), 27,221 votes.

Substitutions:

- Ingrid Lieten (SP.A) resigned on 17 June 2010 and was substituted by Meryame Kitir (SP.A) on 6 July 2010.
- Jan Peumans (N-VA) resigned on 22 June 2010 and was substituted by Peter Luykx (N-VA) on 6 July 2010.
- Ivo Belet (CD&V) resigned on 30 June 2010 and was substituted by Gerald Kindermans (CD&V) on 6 July 2010.
- Frieda Brepoels (N-VA) resigned on 1 July 2010 and was substituted by Veerle Wouters (N-VA) on 6 July 2010.

==== 2000s ====
===== 2007 =====
Results of the 2007 federal election held on 10 June 2007:

Party		Votes per arrondissement				Total votes	%	Seats
Party		Hasselt	Maas- eik	Tong- eren	Expat- riates	Total votes	%	Seats
Christian Democratic and Flemish and New Flemish Alliance	CD&V-N-VA	83,421	52,449	41,394	81	177,345	32.64%	5
Socialist Party Different and Spirit	SP.A-Spirit	61,313	26,969	21,669	43	109,994	20.24%	3
Vlaams Belang	VB	53,353	25,597	21,303	48	100,301	18.46%	2
Open Flemish Liberals and Democrats	Open Vld	42,146	25,188	32,436	90	99,860	18.38%	2
Groen	Groen	11,858	5,186	5,196	49	22,289	4.10%	0
List Dedecker	LDD	12,258	5,545	4,200	12	22,015	4.05%	0
Workers' Party of Belgium	PVDA	3,361	1,566	867	6	5,800	1.07%	0
Committee for Another Policy	CAP	1,120	2,257	511	5	3,893	0.72%	0
Belgische Unie – Union Belge	BUB	572	281	224	1	1,078	0.20%	0
Pluralis		349	222	185	1	757	0.14%	0
Valid votes		269,751	145,260	127,985	336	543,332	100.00%	12
Rejected votes		13,245	7,637	6,840	31	27,753	4.86%	
Total polled		282,996	152,897	134,825	367	571,085	94.18%	
Registered electors		301,744	160,838	143,336	456	606,374		
Turnout		93.79%	95.06%	94.06%	80.48%	94.18%		

The following candidates were elected: Hilde Claes (SP.A-Spirit), 19,686 votes; Patrick Dewael (Open Vld), 41,544 votes; Gerald Kindermans (CD&V-N-VA), 23,854 votes; Meryame Kitir (SP.A-Spirit), 12,443 votes; Jan Peumans (CD&V-N-VA), 20,257 votes; Johan Sauwens (CD&V-N-VA), 32,245 votes; Bert Schoofs (VB), 27,197 votes; Liesbeth Van der Auwera (CD&V-N-VA), 29,620 votes; Jo Vandeurzen (CD&V-N-VA), 71,235 votes; Peter Vanvelthoven (SP.A-Spirit), 40,348 votes; Hilde Vautmans (Open Vld), 18,664 votes; and Linda Vissers (VB), 17,806 votes.

Substitutions:

- Hilde Claes (SP.A-Spirit) resigned on 14 June 2007 and was substituted by Ludwig Vandenhove (SP.A-Spirit).
- Johan Sauwens (CD&V-N-VA) resigned on 27 June 2007 and was substituted by Raf Terwingen (CD&V-N-VA).
- Jan Peumans (CD&V-N-VA) resigned on 28 June 2007 and was substituted by Hilâl Yalçin (CD&V-N-VA).
- Patrick Dewael (Open Vld) was appointed to the federal government and was substituted by Bruno Steegen (Open Vld) between 21 December 2007 and 29 December 2008.
- Jo Vandeurzen (CD&V-N-VA) was appointed to the federal government and was substituted by Peter Luykx (CD&V-N-VA) between 21 December 2007 and 29 December 2008.
- Jo Vandeurzen (CD&V-N-VA) resigned on 30 June 2009 and was substituted by Peter Luykx (CD&V-N-VA) on 2 July 2009.
- Peter Vanvelthoven (SP.A-Spirit) resigned on 30 June 2009 and was substituted by Peter Luykx (SP.A-Spirit) on 2 July 2009.
- Linda Vissers (VB) resigned on 30 June 2009 and was substituted by Magda Raemaekers (VB) on 2 July 2009.

===== 2003 =====
Results of the 2003 federal election held on 18 May 2003:

Party		Votes per arrondissement				Total votes	%	Seats
Party		Hasselt	Maas- eik	Tong- eren	Expat- riates	Total votes	%	Seats
Socialist Party Different and Spirit	SP.A-Spirit	96,135	42,458	36,197	74	174,864	32.68%	4
Christian Democratic and Flemish	CD&V	52,265	37,421	26,614	67	116,367	21.75%	3
Flemish Liberals and Democrats	VLD	48,160	30,499	34,695	86	113,440	21.20%	3
Vlaams Blok	VB	44,271	21,286	18,169	30	83,756	15.65%	2
New Flemish Alliance	N-VA	10,739	5,219	6,848	20	22,826	4.27%	0
Agalev	Agalev	6,720	3,159	2,860	22	12,761	2.39%	0
Vivant	Vivant	2,990	1,550	1,190	7	5,737	1.07%	0
Workers' Party of Belgium	PVDA	2,013	804	511	4	3,332	0.62%	0
Liberal Appeal	LA	1,122	380	429	8	1,939	0.36%	0
Valid votes		264,415	142,776	127,513	318	535,022	100.00%	12
Rejected votes		10,915	6,999	6,376	72	24,362	4.36%	
Total polled		275,330	149,775	133,889	390	559,384	94.78%	
Registered electors		291,046	156,542	142,217	411	590,216		
Turnout		94.60%	95.68%	94.14%	94.89%	94.78%		

The following candidates were elected: Marleen Beckers-Govaerts (VB), 14,256 votes; Hilde Claes (SP.A-Spirit), 26,314 votes; Patrick Dewael (VLD), 58,164 votes; Theo Kelchtermans (CD&V), 25,906 votes; Karel Pinxten (VLD), 14,885 votes; Bert Schoofs (VB), 24,101 votes; Steve Stevaert (SP.A-Spirit), 130,339 votes; Guy Swennen (SP.A-Spirit), 14,986 votes; Liesbeth Van der Auwera (CD&V), 19,962 votes; Jo Vandeurzen (CD&V), 43,088 votes; Peter Vanvelthoven (SP.A-Spirit), 20,269 votes; and Hilde Vautmans (VLD), 16,448 votes.

Substitutions:

- Steve Stevaert (SP.A-Spirit) was elected to the Senate and was substituted by Annemie Roppe (SP.A-Spirit) on 20 May 2003.
- Patrick Dewael (VLD) was appointed to the federal government and was substituted by Georges Lenssen (VLD) between 14 July 2003 and 7 March 2006; and by Jacques Germeaux (VLD) from 8 March 2006.
- Peter Vanvelthoven (SP.A-Spirit) was appointed Secretary of State in the federal government and was substituted by Anne-Marie Baeke (SP.A-Spirit) on 14 July 2003.
- Karel Pinxten (VLD) resigned on 28 February 2006 and was substituted by Georges Lenssen (VLD) on 8 March 2006.

==== 1990s ====
===== 1999 =====
Results of the 1999 federal election held on 13 June 1999:

Party		Votes per arrondissement			Total votes	%	Seats
Party		Hasselt	Maas- eik	Tong- eren	Total votes	%	Seats
Christian People's Party	CVP	54,841	38,965	24,457	118,263	23.67%	3
Flemish Liberals and Democrats	VLD	47,773	28,685	34,558	111,016	22.22%	3
Flemish Socialist Party	SP	51,569	23,098	19,737	94,404	18.89%	2
Vlaams Blok	VB	34,428	15,923	13,023	63,374	12.68%	1
Agalev	Agalev	26,609	13,278	10,098	49,985	10.00%	1
People's Union and ID21	VU-ID	22,052	10,792	13,463	46,307	9.27%	1
Vivant	Vivant	3,878	1,969	1,551	7,398	1.48%	0
Party for a New Politics in Belgium	PNPB	2,162	915	941	4,018	0.80%	0
Workers' Party of Belgium	PVDA	1,859	1,248	479	3,586	0.72%	0
Social Liberal Democrats	SOLIDE	701	361	253	1,315	0.26%	0
Valid votes		245,872	135,234	118,560	499,666	100.00%	11
Rejected votes		14,508	8,915	8,447	31,870	6.00%	
Total polled		260,380	144,149	127,007	531,536	93.86%	
Registered electors		279,107	151,240	135,969	566,316		
Turnout		93.29%	95.31%	93.41%	93.86%		

The following candidates were elected: Eddy Baldewijns (SP), 30,142 votes; Frieda Brepoels (VU-ID), 20,583 votes; Hubert Brouns (CVP), 18,286 votes; Patrick Dewael (VLD), 55,372 votes; Georges Lenssen (VLD), 11,092 votes; Karel Pinxten (CVP), 31,408 votes; Bert Schoofs (VB), 17,058 votes; Marilou Vanden Poel-Welkenhuysen (VLD), 15,119 votes; Jo Vandeurzen (CVP), 22,216 votes; Peter Vanhoutte (Agalev), 7,087 votes; and Peter Vanvelthoven (SP), 20,920 votes.

Substitutions:

- Patrick Dewael (VLD) resigned on 14 July 1999 after he was appointed Minister-President of Flanders and was substituted by Hugo Philtjens (VLD).

===== 1995 =====
Results of the 1995 federal election held on 21 May 1995:

Party		Votes per arrondissement			Total votes	%	Seats
Party		Hasselt	Maas- eik	Tong- eren	Total votes	%	Seats
Christian People's Party	CVP	68,198	45,315	29,329	142,842	30.10%	4
Flemish Socialist Party	SP	56,497	28,260	23,471	108,228	22.81%	3
Flemish Liberals and Democrats	VLD	42,596	25,500	30,422	98,518	20.76%	2
Vlaams Blok	VB	25,227	10,765	10,138	46,130	9.72%	1
People's Union	VU	16,786	7,251	13,590	37,627	7.93%	1
Agalev	Agalev	14,672	7,076	5,110	26,858	5.66%	0
Aging with Dignity	WOW	2,958	1,149	910	5,017	1.06%	0
Workers' Party of Belgium	PVDA	1,809	1,259	408	3,476	0.73%	0
Better Alternatives Come; Back As Apathetic Desires	BANAAN	2,012	785	594	3,391	0.71%	0
General Association of the Elderly	AOV	445	289	132	866	0.18%	0
Natural Law Party	NWP	422	298	135	855	0.18%	0
Flemish People's Party	VVP	384	185	154	723	0.15%	0
Valid votes		232,006	128,132	114,393	474,531	100.00%	11
Rejected votes		18,266	10,044	9,860	38,170	7.44%	
Total polled		250,272	138,176	124,253	512,701	94.66%	
Registered electors		265,236	144,350	132,017	541,603		
Turnout		94.36%	95.72%	94.12%	94.66%		

The following candidates were elected: Hubert Brouns (CVP), 15,621 votes; Lisette Croes (SP), 13,135 votes; Patrick Dewael (VLD), 49,989 votes; Jean Geraerts (VB), 8,995 votes; Chris Moors (CVP), 17,448 votes; Hugo Olaerts (VU), 8,333 votes; Karel Pinxten (CVP), 58,650 votes; Marilou Vanden Poel-Welkenhuysen (VLD), 16,828 votes; Jo Vandeurzen (CVP), 16,034 votes; Louis Vanvelthoven (SP), 40,097 votes; and Ghislain Vermassen (SP), 11,873 votes.

Substitutions:

- Karel Pinxten (CVP) was appointed to the federal government and was substituted by Maurice Didden (CVP) on 28 June 1995.
