= Verhofstadt II Government =

The Verhofstadt II Government was the federal government of Belgium from 12 July 2003 to 21 December 2007.

It was the second government headed by Prime Minister Guy Verhofstadt (VLD). It was formed after the 2003 general election. It consisted of the Flemish Liberals and Democrats (VLD), the French-speaking Liberal Reformist Party (MR), the Flemish Socialist Party (SP.a) and the French-speaking Socialist Party (PS). Because it comprised liberals and socialists, it was also known as a "purple" coalition. It was a continuation of the Verhofstadt I Government but without the Green parties.

== Original Composition 2003-2004 ==
Parliamentary support of the government

Function	Holder	Party
Prime Minister	Guy Verhofstadt	VLD
Deputy Prime Minister; Minister of Justice	Laurette Onkelinx	PS
Deputy Prime Minister; Minister of Foreign Affairs	Louis Michel	MR
Deputy Prime Minister; Minister of the Budget and Public Enterprises	Johan Vande Lanotte	SP.a
Deputy Prime Minister; Minister of the Interior	Patrick Dewael	VLD
Minister of Employment and Pensions	Frank Vandenbroucke	SP.a
Minister of Defence	André Flahaut	PS
Minister of Development Cooperation	Marc Verwilghen	VLD
Minister of Finance	Didier Reynders	MR
Minister of the Economy, Energy, Foreign Trade, and Science	Fientje Moerman	VLD
Minister of Social Affairs and Public Health	Rudy Demotte	PS
Minister of Mobility and Social Economy	Bert Anciaux	Spirit (SP.a)
Minister of the Civil Service, Integration, and Large Cities	Marie Arena	PS
Minister of the Middle Class and Agriculture	Sabine Laruelle	MR
Minister of the Environment, Consumer Protection, and Sustainable Development	Freya Van den Bossche	SP.a
Secretary of State for Informatization	Peter Vanvelthoven	SP.a
Secretary of State for European Affairs	Jacques Simonet	MR
Secretary of State for Financial Modernization and the Fight Against Fiscal Fraud	Hervé Jamar	MR
Secretary of State for Labour Organization and Welfare at Work	Anissa Temsamani	SP.a
Secretary of State for Family and the Handicapped	Isabelle Simonis	PS
Secretary of State for Administrative Reform	Vincent Van Quickenborne	VLD

=== Reshuffles ===
- On 25 September 2003, Temsamani had to resign because she had lied about a diploma she received
- On 12 February 2004, Jacques Simonet resigned to become Minister-President of Brussels, he was replaced by Didier Donfut (PS).

== Composition after the 2004 Regional elections ==
The 2004 Regional elections saw a fundamental reshuffle to the federal government as various federal ministers joined regional governments after these elections. The federal government after this date is often called Verhofstadt IIbis.

=== 2004 Reshuffles ===
- Louis Michel became European Commissioner and was replaced as Deputy Prime Minister by Didier Reynders and as Foreign Minister by Karel De Gucht (VLD).
- Frank Vandenbroucke joined the Flemish Government and was replaced as minister of Labour by Freya Van den Bossche who kept Consumer Affairs. Bruno Tobback (SP.a) became minister taking over Environment from Freya Van den Bossche and Pensions from Vandenbroucke.
- Fientje Moerman joined the Flemish Government and was replaced as minister for Economy, Energy, Foreign Trade and Scientific Research by Marc Verwilghen, who in turn was succeeded as minister of Development Cooperation by Armand De Decker (MR).
- Bert Anciaux joined the Flemish Government and was succeeded as minister for Mobility by Renaat Landuyt (SP.a)
- Marie Arena became Minister-President of the French Community government and was replaced as minister by Christian Dupont (PS)
- Els Van Weert (Spirit) became state secretary for Sustainable Development
- Isabelle Simonis was replaced by Gisèle Mandaila Malamba (MR) as state secretary for Family and Persons with a handicap

=== Later Reshuffles ===
- On 15 October 2005, Johan Vande Lanotte resigned to become Chairman of the SP.a. He was replaced as Deputy Prime Minister and Minister for the Budget by Freya Van den Bossche, who kept Consumer Affairs. Peter Vanvelthoven was promoted to Minister of Labour and Informatisation and Bruno Tuybens (SP.a) became state secretary for Public Enterprises.
- After the 2007 general elections the Verhofstadt II Government functioned as a caretaker government until December 2007. During that period the following reshuffling took place:
  - On 15 July 2007, Armand De Decker became Chairman of the Belgian Senate. His competence (Development Cooperation) was taken over by Sabine Laruelle and Hervé Jamar was promoted to minister.
  - In July 2007 Rudy Demotte became Minister-President of the Walloon Government. His competences were taken over by Didier Donfut, who was promoted to minister.
