= Minister of Development Cooperation (Belgium) =

This is the list of Belgian ministers of Development Cooperation.

== List of ministers ==
=== 2000– ===
Start	End	Minister	Party affiliation	Extra
1999	2003	Eddy Boutmans	Agalev	Staatssecretaris
2003	2004	Marc Verwilghen	VLD	
2004	2007	Armand De Decker	MR	
2007	2011	Charles Michel	MR	
2011	2011	Olivier Chastel	MR	
2011	2013	Paul Magnette	PS	
2013	2014	Jean-Pascal Labille	PS	
2014	2020	Alexander De Croo	Open Vld	
2020	2022	Meryame Kitir	Vooruit	Represented by Frank Vandenbroucke from 19 October 2022 until 16 December 2022
2022	2022	Frank Vandenbroucke	Vooruit	Acting, replacing Meryame Kitir
2022	2024	Caroline Gennez	Vooruit	
2024	2025	Frank Vandenbroucke	Vooruit	
2025	present	Maxime Prévot	Les Engagés	
