= Gilissen =

Gilissen is a surname. Notable people with this surname include:

- Cornelia Gilissen (1915–1994), American diver
- Erik Gilissen (born 1968), Belgian politician
- Filip Gilissen (born 1980), Belgian artist
- Paul Gilissen (1934–2020), Dutch politician
- Tim Gilissen (born 1982), Dutch footballer
