= Bruno Tobback =

Flemish politician

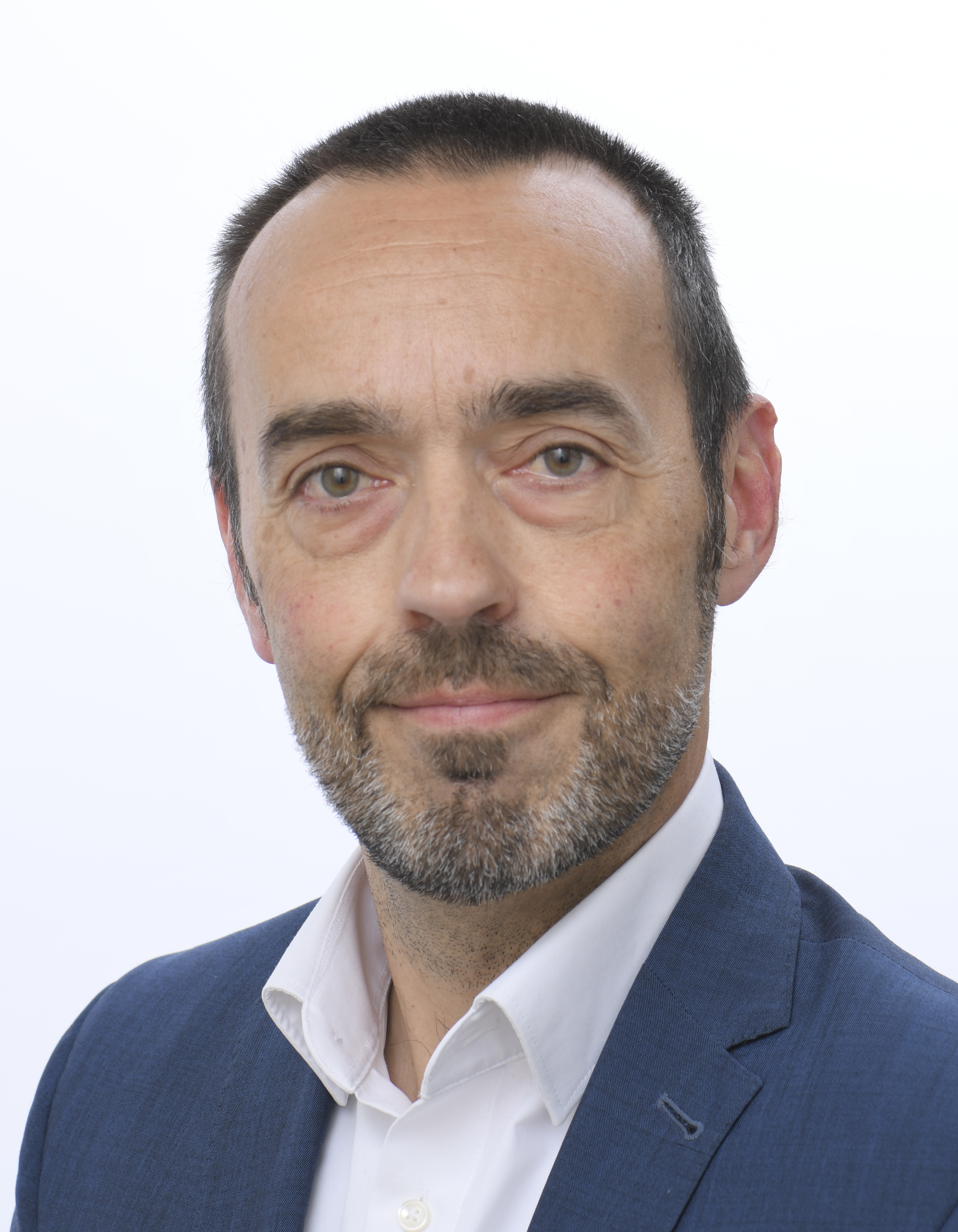
- Official portrait, 2024

Leader of the Socialist Party Differently
- In office 18 September 2011 – 13 June 2015
- Preceded by: Caroline Gennez
- Succeeded by: John Crombez

Member of the Chamber of Representatives
- In office 10 June 2007 – 25 May 2014

Minister for the Environment and Pensions
- In office 19 July 2004 – 21 December 2007
- Preceded by: Freya Van den Bossche (Environment); Frank Vandenbroucke (Pensions)
- Succeeded by: Paul Magnette (Environment); Christian Dupont (Pensions)

Member of the Flemish Parliament
- Incumbent
- Assumed office 25 May 2014
- In office 21 May 1995 – 13 June 2004

Personal details
- Born: 22 August 1969 (age 57) Leuven, Belgium
- Party: Vooruit
- Parent: Louis Tobback (father)
- Education: University of Brussels (VUB); Ghent University
- Occupation: Politician, Lawyer
- Website: Official website

Bruno Tobback (born 22 August 1969) is the former president of the Flemish socialist party Vooruit from 2011 to 2015. He was Minister of Environment and Pensions in the Belgian federal government from 2004 until 2007. He is the son of a former minister and former mayor of Leuven Louis Tobback. He is a Licentiate in Law (Vrije Universiteit Brussel, 1992) and a Licentiate in Social and Economic Law (UGent, 1994). He was a member of the Flemish Parliament from 1995 to 2004.

Bruno Tobback wishes to ban old-fashioned incandescent light bulbs, and thinks the ban on incandescent light bulbs should be included in the list of measures under the Kyoto Protocol.

He has a master's degree in Law (VUB, 1992) and a master's degree in Social and Economic Law.

He was the leader of the SP.a group in the Flemish Parliament. He was responsible for the environment, conservation of nature and mobility.

On 18 September 2008, he was badly injured after a fall during mountain climbing in Austria, after which he was taken to hospital with several cracks in the skull and multiple fractures. His girlfriend, Vicky Willems, managed to encounter his fall, as they were linked to each other with a cord.

On 2 July 2009, he followed Peter Vanvelthoven, who was the new leader of the sp.a group in the Flemish Parliament, as the group leader of sp.a in the federal Chamber of Representatives.

In 2011, he was a candidate to succeed Caroline Gennez as the president of sp.a. Being the only candidate, he was elected on 18 September 2011 in Nieuwpoort at a congress, with 96.6% of all votes. In the June 2015 leadership election, following the party's poor results in the 2014 general elections, he was defeated by John Crombez.

== Honours ==
- Grand Officer Order of Leopold
