= Joy Donné =

Belgian politician

Member of the Chamber of Representatives
- Incumbent
- Assumed office 2019

Personal details
- Born: 1974 (age 51–52) Hasselt
- Citizenship: Belgium
- Party: New Flemish Alliance (N-VA; since 2014); Open VLD (before 2014).

Leo Joy Donné (born 1974) is a Belgian politician and a member of the Flemish nationalist New Flemish Alliance and a member of the Belgian Chamber of Representatives.

== Biography ==
Donné obtained a master's degree in law from the KU Leuven (Katholieke Universiteit Leuven) in 1997 before studying a specialization year in Economic and Business Law at the Sorbonne in Paris. He then worked as a lawyer and a legal director for various investment companies.

In 2014, he started working for N-VA. From October 2014 to December 2018, he was Cabinet Secretary for Security and Home Affairs to Deputy Prime Minister and Minister of Security and Home Affairs Jan Jambon, alongside Herman De Bode, who became Cabinet Secretary for General Policy. When De Bode left in August 2016, Joy combined both functions until the fall of the Michel I Government in December 2018. In 2019, Donné became an MP in the Chamber of Representatives to replace Zuhal Demir, who became a minister in the Flemish Government.

== Controversy ==
In 2014, during the negotiations for the Michel I Government, Donné came to the attention of the media. He picked up Bart De Wever at the Mouvement Reformateur headquarters after a night of negotiations in a Porsche Carrera. Before getting into the car, he took a note, possibly a parking ticket, from under the windshield wiper in view of the media cameras and threw it on the street. Also, the front number plate, a duplicate, did not match the rear number plate, the original. The license plate on the front number plate belonged to a woman from Houthalen-Helchteren, who previously received two parking fines that she knew nothing about.
