= Nemo (Belgian band) =

Belgian rock band

- Origin: Houthalen-Helchteren, Belgian
- Genres: Rock
- Years active: 1991–1998
- Labels: Brinkman
- Past members: Peter Houben; Herman Houbrechts; Bart Gijbels; Bert Maes; Pascal Deweze; Aldo Struyf

Nemo is a former Belgian rock band which was popular in the nineties. The group was founded in 1991 in Houthalen-Helchteren. In 1992 they took part in Humo's Rock Rally. They reached the finals, but ultimately ended in the top three. In 1993 they released their debut album Nemo. Singer Peter Houben had with Mauro Pawlowski the side project Mitsoobishy Jacson. Drummer Herman Houbrechts was also active in Dead Man Ray, the former group of Daan Stuyven. He also designs album covers. In 1997 changed the members of the group. Pascal Deweze of Metal Molly joined the group along with Bert Maes. In 1998 they released their last album, Kiss Me, You Fool. From this album, "StarSign" was issued as single, also the last single from the band.

== Discography ==
Albums

- 1993: Nemo
- 1995: Popmusics (EP)
- 1995: Dum Dàda
- 1998: Kiss Me, You Fool

Singles

- 1993: Bicycle Called Love
- 1994: She Loves Animals
- 1995: Great Machine
- 1995: Suck Them Flowers
- 1998: Starsign

== Group members ==
- Peter Houben: voice, guitar
- Herman Houbrechts: drums, voice
- Bart Gijbels: bass (1991 - 1997)
- Bert Maes: bass (1997 - 1998)
- Pascal Deweze: guitar (1997 - 1998)
- Aldo Struyf: guitar
