= Caroline Gennez =

Belgian politician (born 1975)

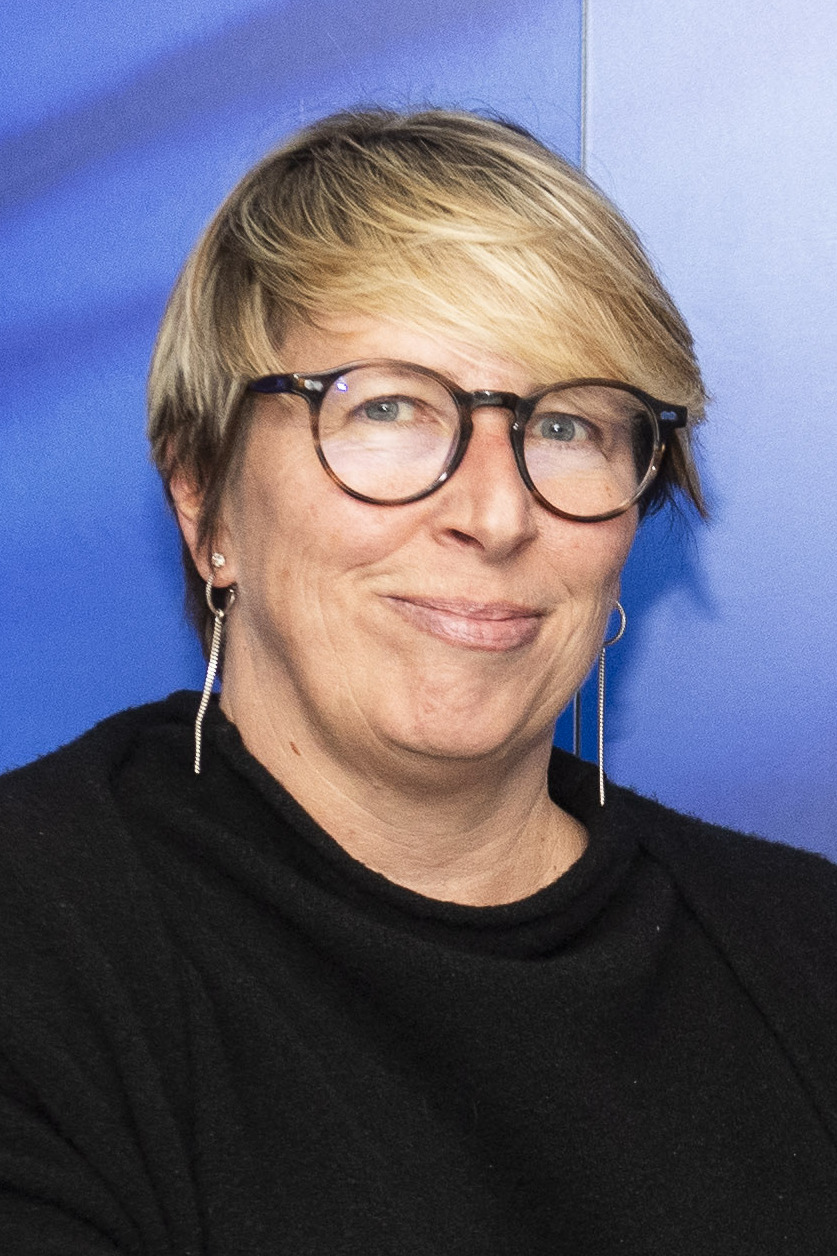
- Gennez in 2024

Minister of Development Cooperation and Urban Policy
- In office 17 December 2022 – 1 October 2024
- Monarch: Philippe
- Prime Minister: Alexander De Croo
- Preceded by: Meryame Kitir
- Succeeded by: Frank Vandenbroucke (Acting)

Member of the Flemish Parliament
- In office 2009–2010; 2014–2022

Member of the Belgian Parliament (Chamber of Representatives)
- In office 2004–2007; 2010–2014

Chairwoman of SP.A
- In office 21 October 2007 – 18 September 2011
- Preceded by: Johan Vande Lanotte
- Succeeded by: Bruno Tobback

Schepen for education, youth, employment and social economy in Mechelen
- In office 2007–2012

City councillor in Mechelen
- In office 2007–2019

Member of the Belgian Parliament (Senate)
- In office 19 June 2003 – 6 July 2004

Schepen in Sint-Truiden
- In office 2003

City councillor in Sint-Truiden
- In office 2001–2003

Chairwoman of the Jongsocialisten
- In office 1998–2003
- Preceded by: Dylan Casaer
- Succeeded by: Laurent Winnock

Personal details
- Born: 21 August 1975 (age 51) Sint-Truiden, Belgium
- Party: Vooruit
- Education: University of Leuven
- Occupation: Politician
- Website: www.carolinegennez.be

Caroline Gennez (Flemish: [kaːroːˈlinə ʑəˈneː, -ˈliɲ -]; born 21 August 1975) is a Belgian socialist politician who served as the Minister of Development Cooperation and Urban Policy in the De Croo Government from December 2022 until October 2024. She is a former chairwoman of the Socialist Party – Different (SP.A) in Flanders.

== Early life and education ==
Gennez was born in Sint-Truiden. From the age of 5 until she was 14, she was a talented tennis player. A hernia ended this career. She got a Master in Political and Sociological Sciences at the Catholic University of Leuven.

== Political career ==
After her studies, Gennez joined the Young Socialists, and became their chairperson in 1998.

While working as an advisor to Johan Vande Lanotte, Gennez became a city councillor (2001–2003) and an alderman (2003) in Sint-Truiden. In 2003, her party appointed her to the Belgian Senate and made her move to Mechelen. At that moment she called for a boycott of the Israeli song in the Eurovision song festival contest. In 2004 she became fraction leader in the Flemish Parliament (2004–2007). Since October 2006, she has been first alderman in Mechelen, responsible for education, youth, employment and social economy.

After the electoral defeat in June 2007 at the federal elections, Gennez was elected the successor of Johan Vande Lanotte as chairperson of the SP.A, the party of which she has been vice-president since 2003. Between May and October 2005, she was already chairperson ad interim of the SP.A. After her announcement in June 2011 to not run for a second term as chairwoman, she was succeeded by Bruno Tobback on 18 September 2011.

In the 2014 regional elections, Gennez returned to the Flemish Parliament once again. She was elected as a list leader in the province of Antwerp. From September 2014 to May 2019, she served on the Bureau (executive committee) of the Flemish Parliament as the fourth vice president, under the leadership of Jan Peumans. In the 2019 elections, she was re-elected. From June 2019, she was again part of the Bureau of the Flemish Parliament, this time as secretary.

Since October 2022, Gennez has been the treasurer of the Party of European Socialists (PES) under its chair Stefan Löfven.

In December 2022 she was appointed Minister of Development Cooperation and Urban Policy in the De Croo Government after the resignation of Meryame Kitir.

== Other activities ==
=== International organizations ===
- African Development Bank (AfDB), Ex-Officio Member of the Board of Governors (since 2022)
- Asian Development Bank (ADB), Ex-Officio Alternate Member of the Board of Governors (since 2022)
- Inter-American Development Bank (IDB), Ex-Officio Alternate Member of the Board of Governors (since 2022)
- European Bank for Reconstruction and Development (EBRD), Ex-Officio Alternate Member of the Board of Governors (since 2022)
- World Bank, Ex-Officio Alternate Member of the Board of Governors (since 2022)

=== Non-profit organizations ===
- Universiteit Associatie Brussel (UAB), Chair (since 2013)
