= Alain Yzermans =

Belgian politician (born 1967)

Member of the Chamber of Representatives
- Incumbent
- Assumed office 9 June 2024
- Constituency: Limburg

Personal details
- Born: 21 May 1967 (age 59) Etterbeek, Belgium
- Party: Vooruit

Alain L. J. Yzermans (born 21 May 1967) is a Belgian politician and member of the Chamber of Representatives. A member of Vooruit, he has represented Limburg since June 2024.

Yzermans was born on 21 May 1967 in Etterbeek. He was elected to the municipal council in Houthalen-Helchteren at the 1994 local election. He was re-elected at the 2000, 2006, 2012 and 2018 local elections. He was schepen (alderman) for culture, youth and tourism before becoming mayor of Houthalen-Helchteren in 2003. He contested the 2014 federal election as the Socialist Party Different (SP.A)'s first placed substitute candidate in Limburg and received 8,396 preference votes. He was elected to the Chamber of Representatives at the 2024 federal election.

On 16 September 2026, it was reported that Yzermans had accumulated 112 registered speeding offences. In October 2024, he was recorded driving at 97 km/h (corrected to 91 km/h) in a 50 km/h zone in Genk. He was subsequently sentenced to a fine and a driving ban. The sentence was later annulled due to his parliamentary immunity.

Electoral history of Alain Yzermans
Election	Constituency	Party	Votes	Result
2006 local	Houthalen-Helchteren	Socialist Party Different	3,080	Elected
2012 local	Houthalen-Helchteren	Socialist Party Different-Groen-Plus	2,250	Elected
2018 local	Houthalen-Helchteren	Socialist Party Different	2,599	Elected
2024 federal	Limburg	Vooruit	10,755	Elected
