= Steven Coenegrachts =

Belgian politician (born 1985)

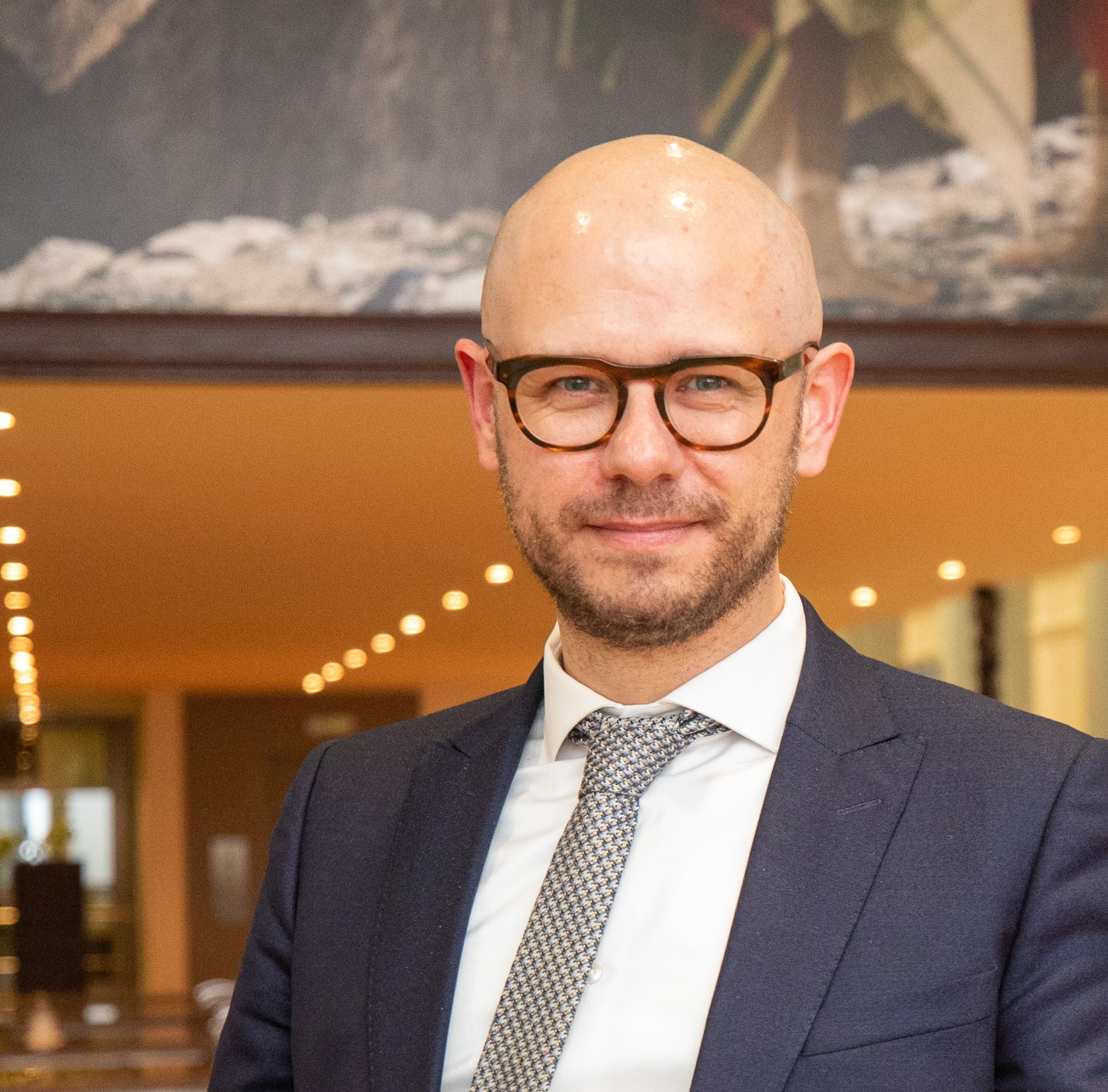
- Coenegrachts in 2022

Member of the Chamber of Representatives
- Incumbent
- Assumed office 9 June 2024
- Constituency: Limburg

Personal details
- Born: 14 July 1985 (age 40)
- Party: Anders

Steven Coenegrachts (born 14 July 1985) is a Belgian politician of Anders (formerly Open Flemish Liberals and Democrats) serving as a member of the Chamber of Representatives since 2024. He was a member of the Flemish Parliament and the Benelux Parliament from 2019 to 2024, and a member of the Senate from 2021 to 2024.
