= Josly Piette =

Belgian politician

Josly Piette (born 1943 in Glons) is a Belgian politician and former trade unionist. He is a member of the Centre démocrate humaniste (cdH).

Since 2006 he has been mayor of the Liège municipality of Bassenge. He was also Federal Minister of Employment in the interim Verhofstadt III government from 2007 till 2008.
