= Theo Kelchtermans =

Belgian politician (1943–2025)

Theo Kelchtermans (27 June 1943 – 17 December 2025) was a Belgian politician.

== Life and career ==
=== Early life and local career ===
Kelchtermans was born in Peer, Belgium on 27 June 1943. He graduated with a degree in applied psychology at the Catholic University of Leuven.

Kelchtermans worked as a consultant at the CLB center of Neerpelt. He was from 1975 to 1985 member of the Regional Economic Council for Flanders (GERV). From 1974 to 1981, he served as county councilor in Limburg.

He served from 1980 to 2013 as Mayor of Peer, where he sat on the town council from 1977 to 1980. In 2013, he left the position as Mayor, after which he was succeeded by Steven Matheï.

=== Parliamentary career ===
Kelchtermans had a long parliamentary career. From 1981 to 1991, he served as a member of the Chamber of Representatives. Then, he served as a member of the Senate from 1991 to 1995 and 1999 and 2003. After his second term as senator, he served again as a Representative. In the time from December 1981 to May 1995, he served a dual mandate that allowed him to also sit on the Flemish Council. The Flemish Council from 21 October 1980, the successor to the Cultural Council for the Dutch Cultural Community, which was installed on 7 December 1971, and was the forerunner of the current Flemish Parliament. At the first direct elections to the Flemish Parliament on 21 May 1995, he was elected in the constituency Hasselt Tongeren-Maaseik. He stayed for one month the Flemish Parliament until he again took the oath as Flemish minister on 20 June 1995.

Between 1985 and 1999, he also held various ministerial posts in the Flemish Executive (1985–1995) and the Government of Flanders (1995–1999). From 1985 to 1988, he was regional minister of Education in the Government under Prime Minister Gaston Geens. In 1988, he was community Minister for Employment, Education and the Civil Service in the third term government of Gaston Geens. From 1988 to 1992, he was regional minister for Public Works, Transport and Planning in the fourth term government under Geens. From 1992 to 1995, he was regional minister of Public Works, Planning and Home Affairs in the second term of Luc Van den Brande. From 1995 to 1999, he was Flemish Minister for Environment and Employment.

=== Death ===
Kelchtermans died on 17 December 2025, at the age of 82.

== Timeline of career ==
- 1974–1981 County Councillor Limburg
- 1977–2012 Councillor Peer
- 1977–1980 Peer Ships
- 1980–2012 Mayor Peer
- 1981–1991 Member of Parliament
- 1981–1995 Member Flemish Council
- 1985–1988 Community Minister of Education and Training
- 1988 Community Minister for Employment, Education and Civil Service
- 1988–1992 Community Minister for the Environment, Nature Conservation and Country Furnishings
- 1991–1995 Senator
- 1992–1995 Flemish Minister for Public Works, Planning and Home Affairs
- 1995 Flemish Parliament
- 1995–1999 Flemish Minister for Environment and Employment
- 1999–2003 Senator
- 2003–2007 Member of Parliament

== Honours ==
- 2007 : Knight grand Cross in the Order of Leopold II.
- 1999: grand Officer in the Order of Leopold.
