= Funda Oru =

Belgian politician (born 1985)

Member of the Chamber of Representatives
- Incumbent
- Assumed office 9 June 2024
- Constituency: Limburg

Personal details
- Born: 10 July 1985 (age 41) Heusden-Zolder, Belgium
- Party: Vooruit
- Education: Vrije Universiteit Brussel

Funda Oru (born 10 July 1985) is a Belgian politician and member of the Chamber of Representatives. A member of Vooruit, she has represented Limburg since June 2024.

Oru was born on 10 July 1985 in Heusden-Zolder and is of Turkish origin. She studied political sciences at Vrije Universiteit Brussel (2003–2007). She worked at the Socialist Party Different (SP.A)'s research department in Limburg. She became an advisor at the federal Ministry of Development Cooperation and Urban Policy in 2022.

Oru was elected to the municipal council in Heusden-Zolder at the 2012 local election. She became Schepen (alderman) for youth, playgrounds, seniors, personnel and poverty reduction in 2014. She was re-elected at the 2018 local election. She contested the 2014 regional election as the SP.A's 13th placed substitute candidate in Limburg and received 6,725 preference votes. She contested the 2019 federal election as the SP.A's fifth placed candidate in Limburg but the party won only two seats in the constituency. Oru became vice-chair of Vooruit in 2019. She was elected to the Chamber of Representatives at the 2024 federal election.

Electoral history of Funda Oru
Election	Constituency	Party	Votes	Result
2012 local	Heusden-Zolder	Socialist Party Different	717	Elected
2018 local	Heusden-Zolder	Socialist Party Different	937	Elected
2019 federal	Limburg	Socialist Party Different	9,379	Not elected
2024 federal	Limburg	Vooruit	14,334	Elected
