= Meryame Kitir =

Belgian politician

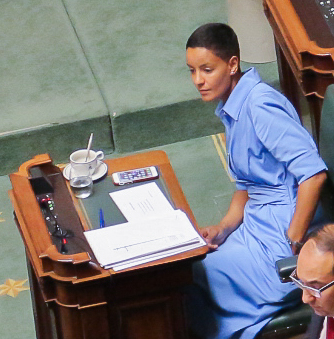
- Kitir in 2019

Minister of Development Cooperation and Urban Policy
- In office 1 October 2020 – 17 December 2022
- Monarch: Philippe
- Prime Minister: Alexander De Croo
- Preceded by: Alexander De Croo
- Succeeded by: Caroline Gennez

Leader of Forward in the Chamber of Representatives
- In office 1 October 2015 – 1 October 2020
- Preceded by: Karin Temmerman
- Succeeded by: Melissa Depraetere

Member of the Chamber of Representatives from Limburg
- In office 28 June 2007 – 1 October 2020
- Succeeded by: Bert Moyaers

Personal details
- Born: 20 April 1980 (age 46) Maasmechelen, Belgium
- Party: Forward
- Education: Saint Barbara Institute
- Website: Party website

Meryame Kitir (born 20 April 1980) is a Belgian politician of the Forward party who served as the Minister of Development Cooperation and Urban Policy in the De Croo Government from October 2020 until December 2022, although the last two months she was out on sick leave. She has also been serving on the Genk municipal council since 2019, and previously sat on the Maasmechelen municipal council from 2006 to 2016.

== Political career ==
Kitir has been a member of the Chamber of Representatives since June 2007. In 2015, she became leader of her party's parliamentary group. She is known for her fiery manner in addressing issues, commonly having to do with the specific problems faced by the vast labour force of the Limburg province she represents.

== Other activities ==
- African Development Bank (AfDB), Ex-Officio Member of the Board of Governors (2020–2022)
- Asian Development Bank (ADB), Ex-Officio Alternate Member of the Board of Governors (2020–2022)
- Inter-American Development Bank (IDB), Ex-Officio Alternate Member of the Board of Governors (2020–2022)
- European Bank for Reconstruction and Development (EBRD), Ex-Officio Alternate Member of the Board of Governors (2020–2022)
- World Bank, Ex-Officio Alternate Member of the Board of Governors (2020–2022)
