= Charles Michel =

Belgian politician (born 1975)

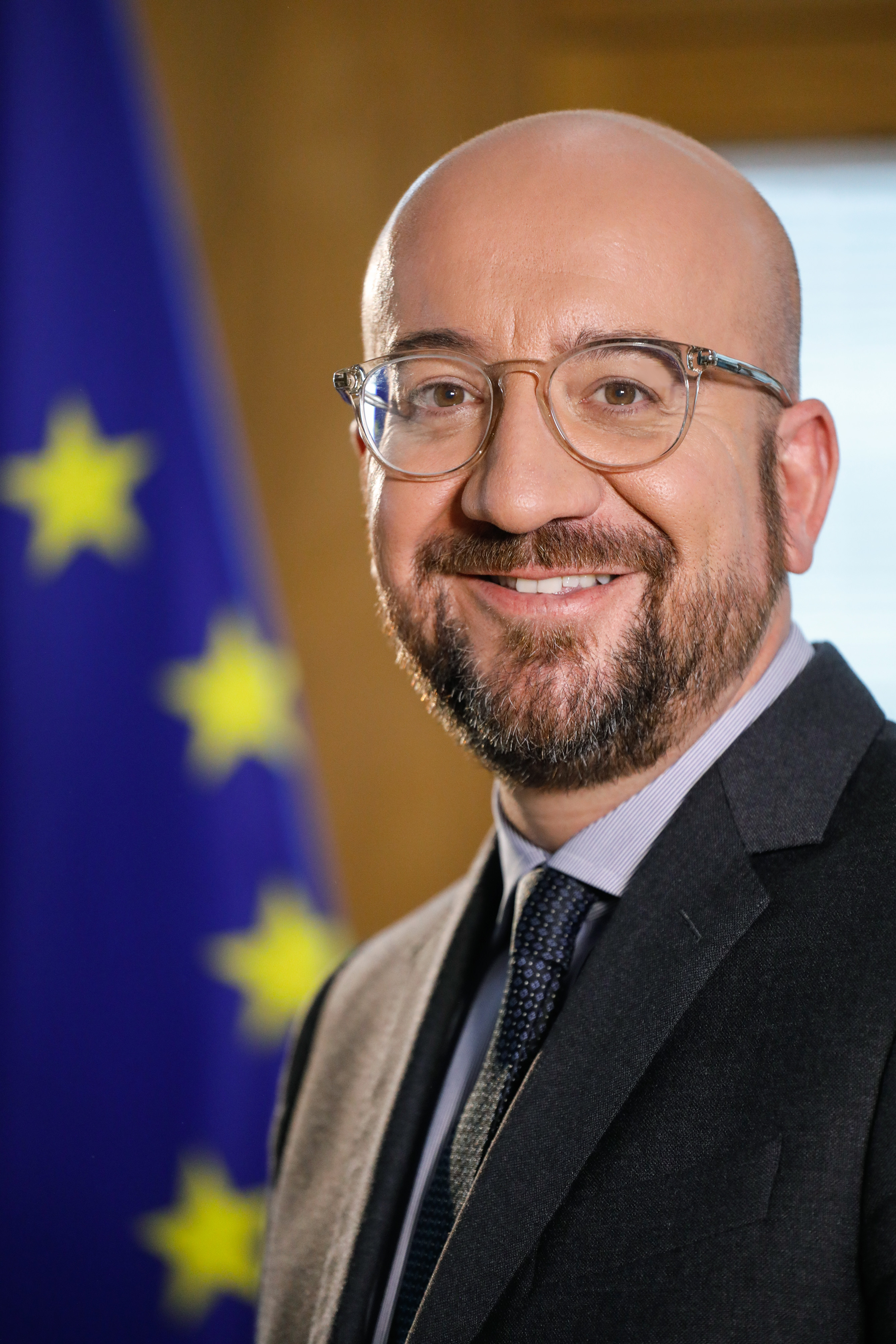
- Official portrait, 2019

President of the European Council
- In office 1 December 2019 – 30 November 2024
- Preceded by: Donald Tusk
- Succeeded by: António Costa

Prime Minister of Belgium
- In office 11 October 2014 – 27 October 2019
- Monarch: Philippe
- Deputy: Jan Jambon; Kris Peeters; Koen Geens; Didier Reynders; Alexander De Croo
- Preceded by: Elio Di Rupo
- Succeeded by: Sophie Wilmès

President of the Reformist Movement
- In office 18 February 2019 – 29 November 2019
- Preceded by: Olivier Chastel
- Succeeded by: Georges-Louis Bouchez
- In office 14 February 2011 – 10 October 2014
- Preceded by: Didier Reynders
- Succeeded by: Olivier Chastel

Minister of Development Cooperation
- In office 21 December 2007 – 14 February 2011
- Prime Minister: Guy Verhofstadt; Yves Leterme; Herman Van Rompuy
- Preceded by: Armand De Decker
- Succeeded by: Olivier Chastel

Personal details
- Born: 21 December 1975 (age 50) Namur, Wallonia, Belgium
- Party: Reformist Movement
- Height: 1.83 m (6 ft 0 in)
- Spouse: Amélie Derbaudrenghien
- Children: 3
- Parent: Louis Michel (father)
- Education: Université libre de Bruxelles; University of Amsterdamˈ

Charles Michel (French: [ʃaʁl(ə) miʃɛl]; born 21 December 1975) is a Belgian politician who served as the president of the European Council from 2019 to 2024. He previously served as the prime minister of Belgium between 2014 and 2019. Michel became the minister of development cooperation in 2007 at age thirty-one, and remained in this position until elected the leader of the Francophone liberal Reformist Movement (MR) in February 2011. He led MR to the 2014 federal election, where they emerged as the third-largest party in the Chamber of Representatives. After coalition negotiations, Michel was confirmed as prime minister of an MR-N-VA-OVLD-CD&V government. He was sworn in on 11 October 2014, becoming the youngest Belgian prime minister since Jean-Baptiste Nothomb in 1841.

In December 2018, the government collapsed following internal disagreements over the handling of the Global Compact for Migration, with the N-VA withdrawing from the cabinet. Michel subsequently tendered his resignation and remained in office in a caretaker capacity. At the 2019 federal election shortly afterwards, MR lost a number of seats, although Michel remained in office as interim prime minister during coalition negotiations. Weeks after the federal election, on 2 July 2019, the European Council voted to appoint Michel as its new president. He took over from Donald Tusk at a ceremony on 29 November 2019, formally beginning his term on 1 December 2019. In January 2024, he announced he would step down as president of the European Council to run in the 2024 European Parliament election, before reversing his decision within the same month and declaring he would finish his current mandate.

== Early life and education ==
Michel was born in Namur, Wallonia, on 21 December 1975. He is the son of Louis Michel, a former European Commissioner, and Martine Pierre. Michel began his political career at the age of 16 when he joined the Young Liberal Reformers of Jodoigne (Jeunes Réformateurs Libéraux de Jodoigne), affiliated to the MR. In 1994, at the age of 18, he was elected provincial councilor in Walloon Brabant. He graduated in law at the Université libre de Bruxelles (ULB) and the University of Amsterdam in 1998, after which he became lawyer at the Brussels Bar. He is fluent in Dutch and English in addition to his native French.

His brother Mathieu Michelis also a Belgian politician, having served as Secretary of State for Digitisation between 2020 and 2025.

== Early political career ==
Shortly after finishing university, while his father was Belgium's Minister of Home Affairs, Michel was elected to the federal Chamber of Representatives in 1999 (age 23), representing Walloon Brabant, a stronghold of the liberal MR. In 2000, he became Minister of Home Affairs in the Walloon Government aged 25, making him the youngest regional minister in Belgian history. At the same time, his father was minister of Home Affairs at the national level. At the local level, he was elected city councillor in Wavre in 2000, and in 2006 became mayor of the city.

In December 2007, Michel became the Minister of Development Cooperation in the Verhofstadt III Government and subsequently in the Leterme I, Van Rompuy I and Leterme II governments. After poor results in the 2009 regional elections, Michel was part of a group demanding the MR leader Didier Reynders resign. After the party suffered further losses in the 2010 federal election, Reynders resigned, and Michel announced his candidacy to replace him. In January 2011, he was elected President of MR, and resigned from the cabinet.

== Prime Minister of Belgium ==
After the 2014 federal election, Michel became co-formateur in the ensuing coalition negotiations. Initially, CD&V Leader Kris Peeters was expected to be prime minister. However CD&V also insisted on Marianne Thyssen being appointed as European Commissioner, and Michel's MR refused to allow the two most important political posts to be held by a single party. Ultimately, the parties agreed to appoint Thyssen as European Commissioner, with an understanding that the prime ministership would go to either MR or OVLD. As Michel was serving as co-formateur, he quickly won internal support from other parties to lead the next government. On 7 October 2014, an overall agreement was reached between the four parties to form a new government, with Michel proposed as prime minister, and Peeters as one of four deputy prime ministers. Michel became the youngest Belgian prime minister in 173 years since Jean-Baptiste Nothomb in 1841, and was only the second Francophone liberal to become prime minister.

In the Ministry of Security and the Interior, many tasks of the federal police are being privatized (securing public buildings, supervising detainees, etc.), while the departments concerned with international crime (especially computer and financial crime) are being decentralized. In defence, while the budget for investment in equipment has been increased at the request of NATO, the number of personnel is to be reduced by 19.5 per cent. Federal cultural and scientific institutions have been hit by budget cuts of 20 per cent. The budget allocated to the functioning of the judiciary is also depleted, leading Belgium's highest magistrate to accuse the "logic of economy" of being responsible for a "pathology of the entire judicial system that endangers the rule of law."

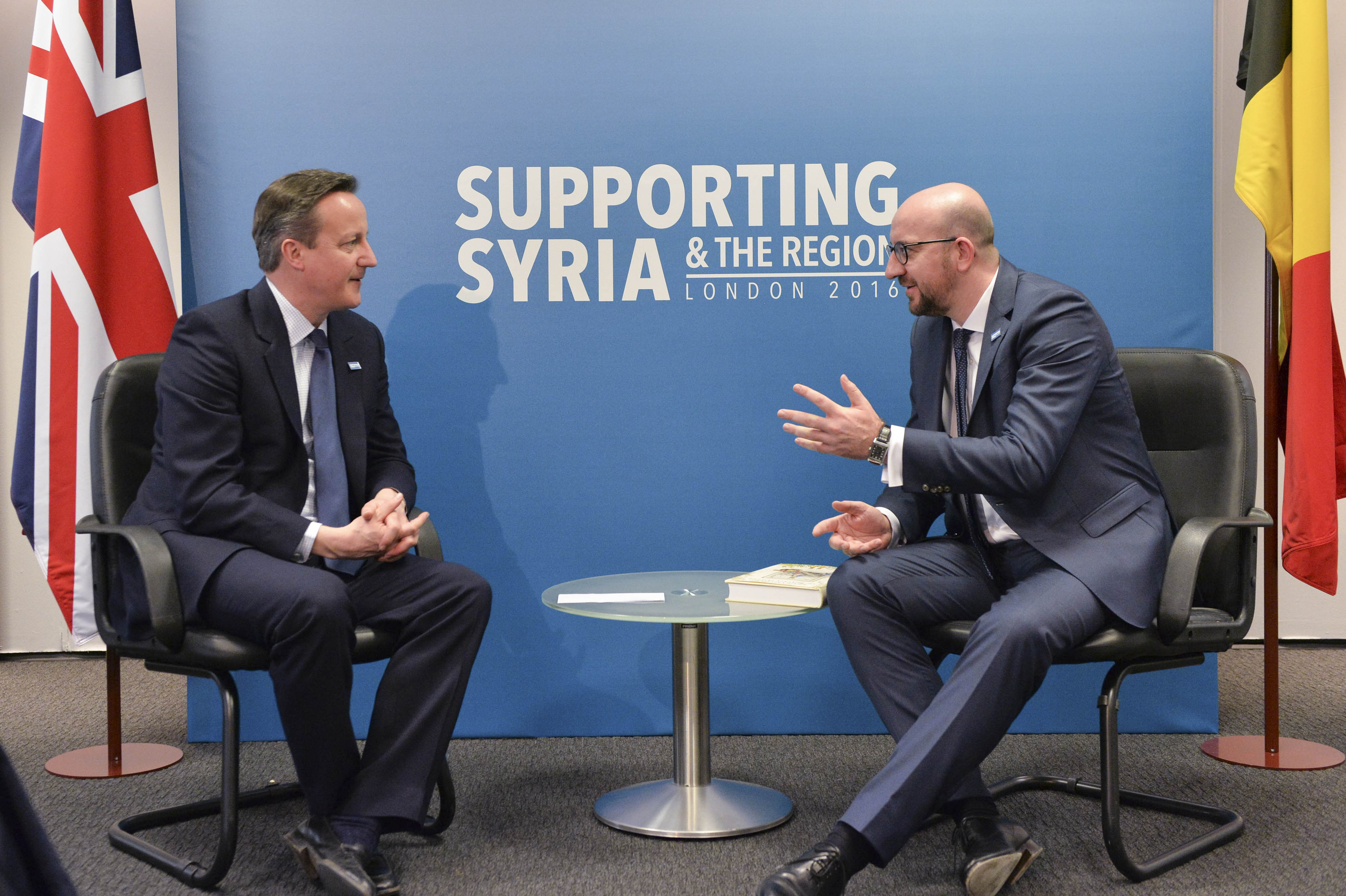
Michel with UK Prime Minister David Cameron in 2016

On 1 January 2016, the tax shift began to take effect. This includes increasing the take-home pay of the lowest income earners through a decrease in social security contributions. The expected increase is €80 net for an employee earning €1,500; €70 for those earning €2,100; and €60 for those earning €2,800. Finance Minister Johan Van Overtveldt says "the tax shift will be a tax cut", although the value-added tax on electricity will rise from 6% to the standard rate of 21% and excise duties on alcohol, diesel, tobacco and soft drinks will increase. A liberal orientation was also adopted in the area of pensions (Bacquelaine law, which reduced the pensions of the formerly unemployed) and labour law (Peeters law, which deregulated the use of overtime, part-time contracts and flexible hours).

In December 2018, a political crisis emerged over whether to sign the Global Compact for Migration. Michel's coalition partner N-VA, which originally supported the Compact, reversed course to oppose it whereas the other three parties continued to support it. Michel subsequently announced the formation of a minority government, with CD&V, MR and OVLD backing the compact. On 18 December, he presented his government's resignation to the King. The King accepted Michel's resignation on 21 December after consulting party leaders. He remained in office as caretaker prime minister during the 2019 federal election, and the ensuing coalition negotiations.

== President of the European Council ==
On 2 July 2019, Michel was selected President of the European Council, one of the most prominent leadership positions of the European Union. On 20 July 2020, Michel announced a historical deal on the recovery package Next Generation EU and the EU 2021–2027 budget to support member states hit by the COVID-19 pandemic. In August 2020, Michel expressed "full solidarity" with Greece and Cyprus in their conflict with Turkey, which has occupied the northern part of Cyprus since July 1974. The Aegean dispute between Turkey and Greece escalated when Ankara resumed gas exploration in contested areas of the eastern Mediterranean.

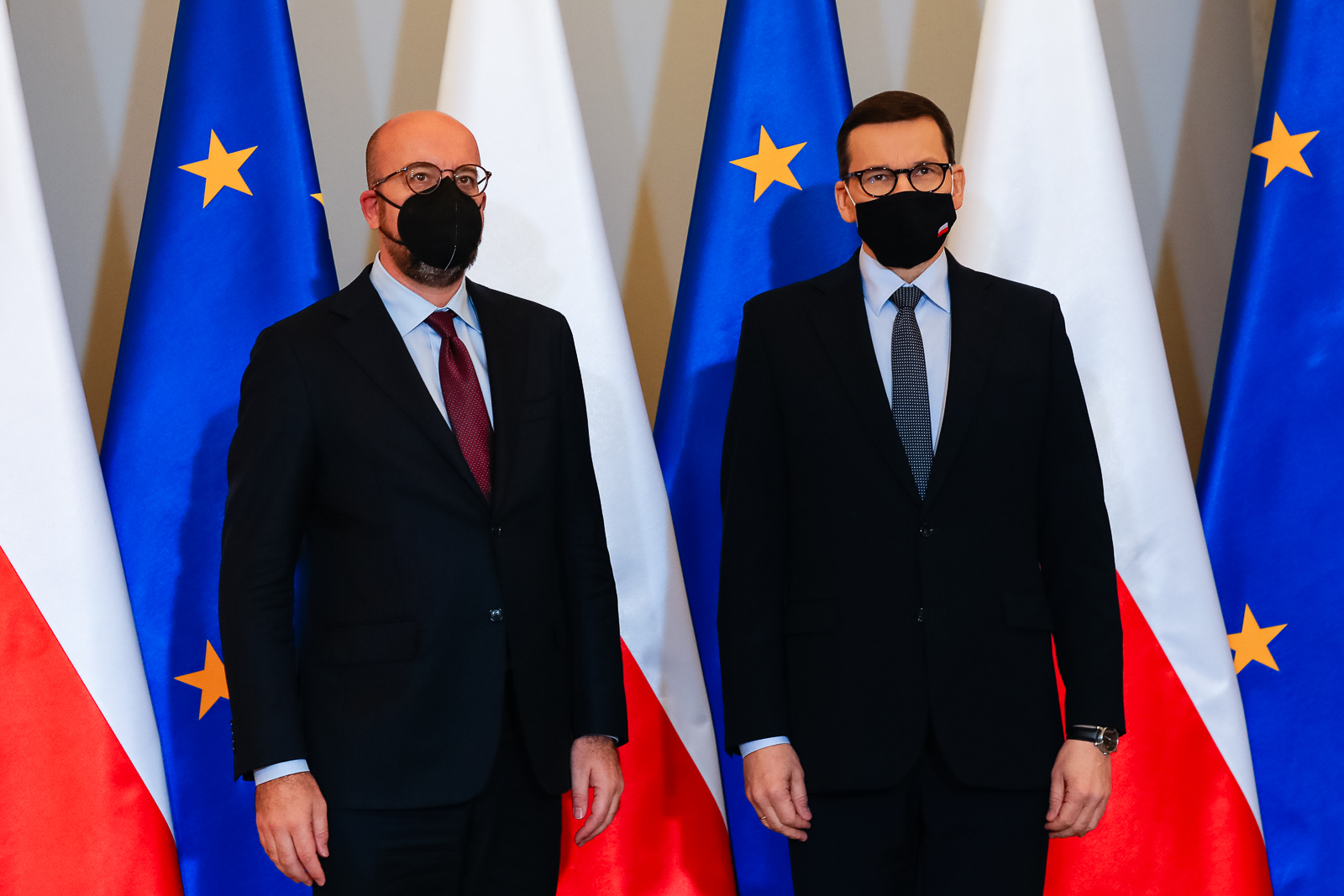
Michel meeting in Warsaw with the Prime Minister of Poland Mateusz Morawiecki, 10 November 2021

On 27 September 2020, Michel expressed deep concern over the escalation of hostilities in the disputed region of Nagorno-Karabakh and called on Armenia and Azerbaijan to immediately halt fighting and progress towards a peaceful resolution. After French-U.S. and French-Australia relations suffered a period of tension in September 2021 due to fallout from the AUKUS defence pact between the U.S., the United Kingdom, and Australia. The security pact is directed at countering Chinese power in the Indo-Pacific region. As part of the agreement, the U.S. agreed to provide nuclear-powered submarines to Australia. After entering into AUKUS, the Australian government cancelled an agreement that it had made with France for the provision of French conventionally powered submarines. The EU called the way France was treated "unacceptable" and demanded an explanation. Michel denounced a "lack of transparency and loyalty" by the United States.

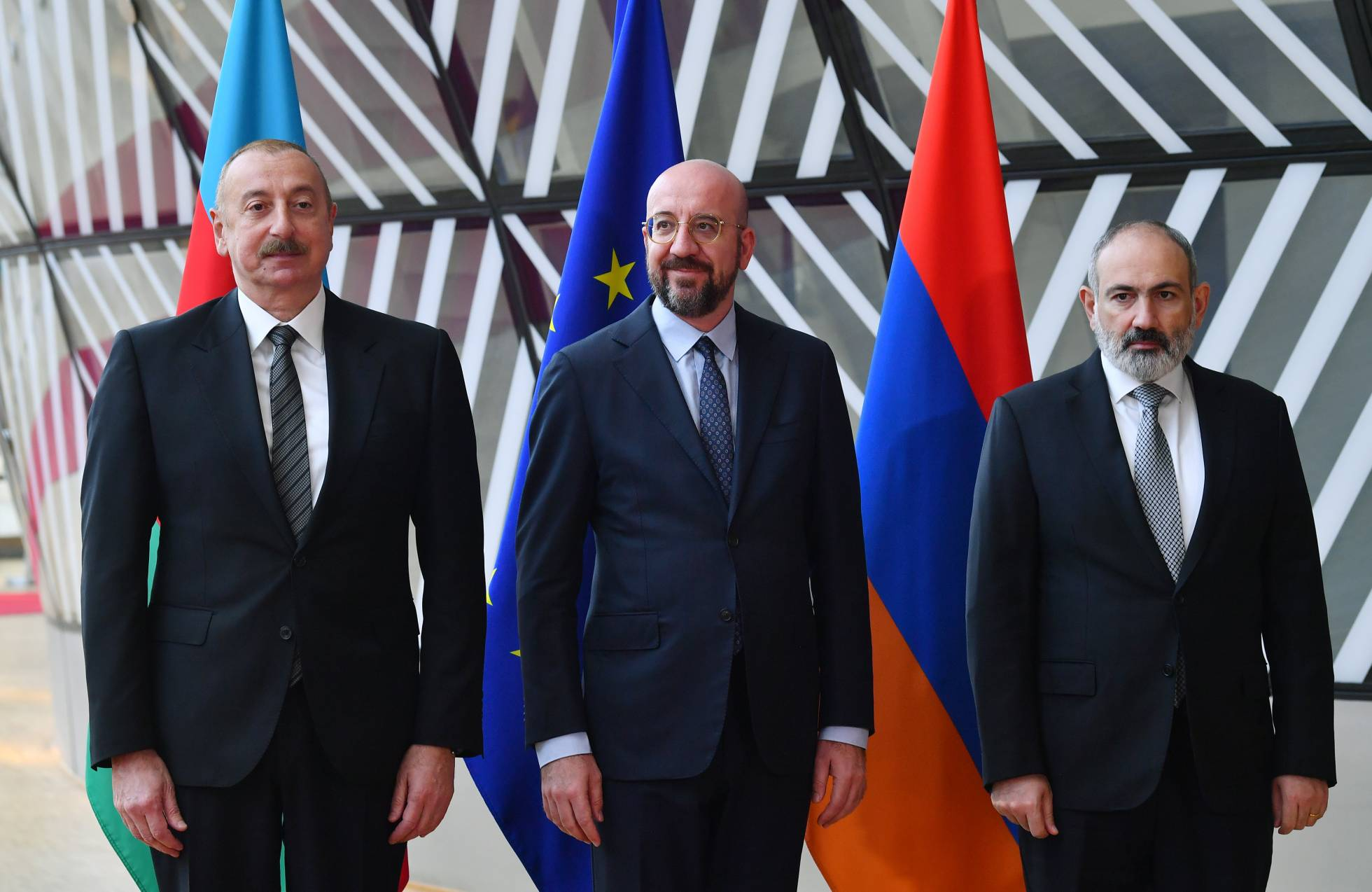
Michel with Azerbaijani President Ilham Aliyev and Armenian Prime Minister Nikol Pashinyan in Brussels, 14 May 2023

During his tenure, there were internal expressions of discontent, including from a prime minister and diplomats from different EU countries to Michel's administration. The EU summits, for which he is responsible as president, were criticized for being not well organized. During his tenure, he ignored the decisions of the European Commission instead of remaining solution-oriented like his predecessors in office. A diplomatic fauxpas known as the "Sofagate" was described as a symbol of the strained working relationship between Commission President Ursula von der Leyen and Michel. Michel illustrated this strain in an interview placed in the April 2026 issue of The Brussels Times, stating "I have my own opinion about her personality, and it's not my intention to make a comment today about personalities. But I can tell you: never in the past had I faced this level of difficulty in terms of collaboration with a colleague." On the subject of Von der Leyen's leadership, Michel critiqued: "There is a super authoritarian governance." and "Commissioners have absolutely no role anymore." Continuing, he said: "She is supposed to work on the defence of the single market. Nothing has been done. She is supposed to work on the financial market. Nothing has been done." and "In this field, the result is zero, and that is a tragedy." Following the 2022 Russian invasion of Ukraine, sanctions against Russia also included asset freezes on the Russian Central Bank, which holds $630 billion in foreign-exchange reserves, to prevent it from offsetting the impact of sanctions. On 5 May, Charles Michel said: "I am absolutely convinced that this is extremely important not only to freeze assets but also to make possible to confiscate it, to make it available for the rebuilding" of Ukraine.

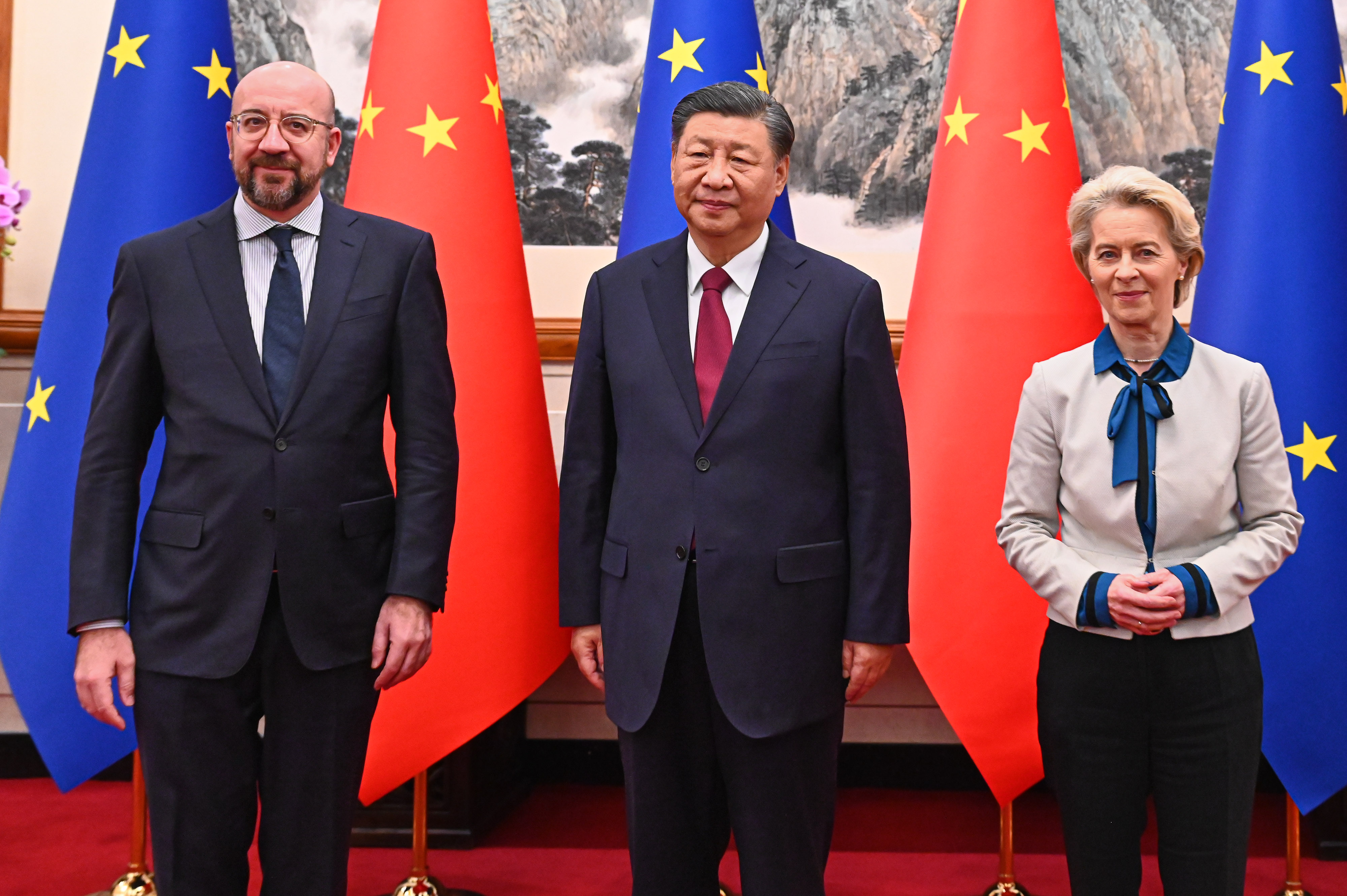
Michel with Chinese President Xi Jinping and President of the European Commission Ursula von der Leyen in Beijing, China, 7 December 2023

In September 2022, Michel met with Saudi Crown Prince Mohammed bin Salman at his palace in Jeddah to discuss strengthening cooperation between the EU and Saudi Arabia. In February 2023, Michel met with Ethiopian Prime Minister Abiy Ahmed in Addis Ababa to normalize EU-Ethiopia relations that had been damaged by the Tigray War. In September 2023, Michel condemned Azerbaijan's offensive in Nagorno-Karabakh and urged the country to immediately stop its military activities and return to dialogue. In October 2023, he said that Russia "betrayed the Armenian people" after Azerbaijan regained control of the disputed zone from Armenian separatists.

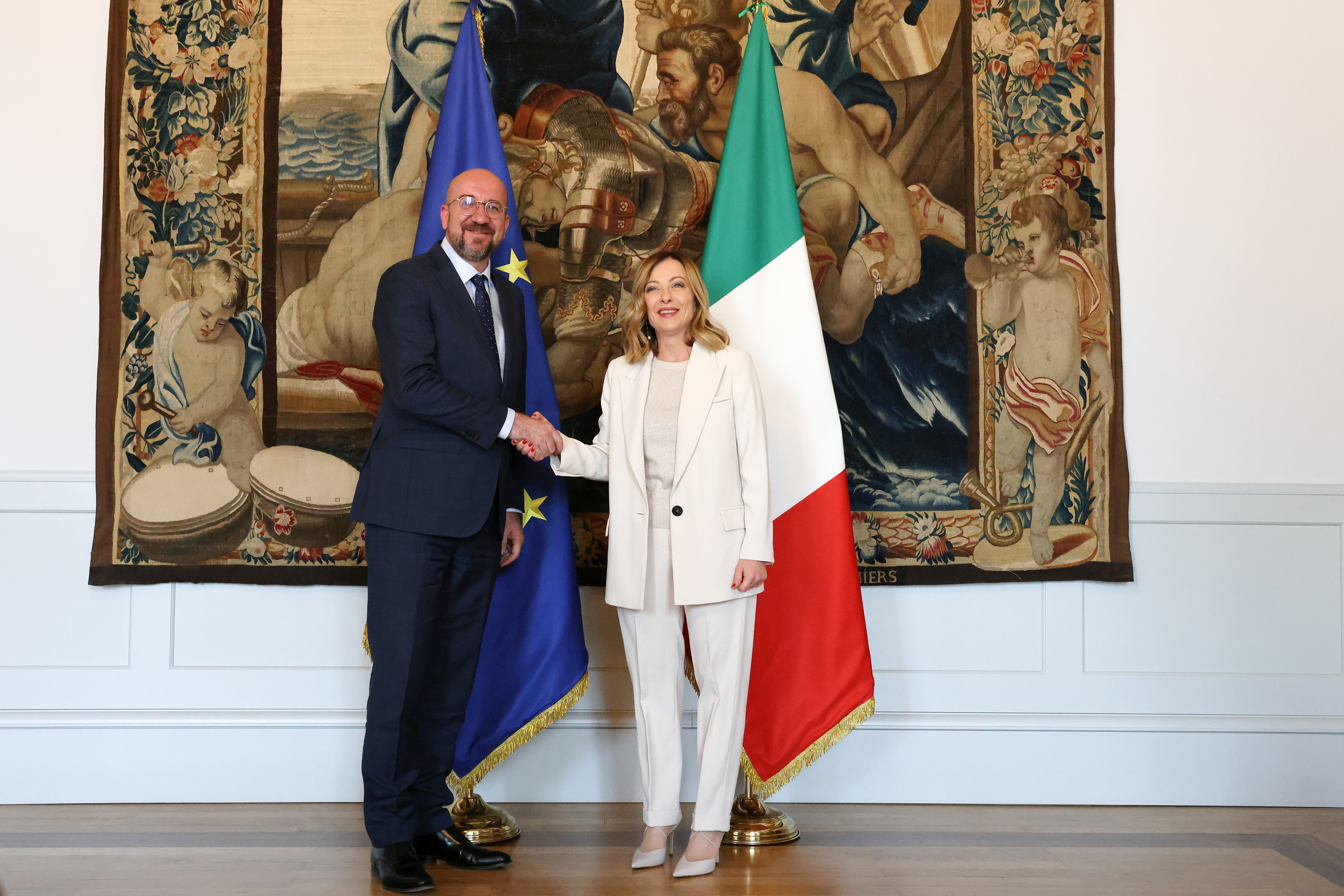
Michel with Italian Prime Minister Giorgia Meloni in Rome, 11 April 2024

In January 2024, Michel announced he would step down as president of the European Council to run in the 2024 European Parliament election, before reversing his decision within the same month and declaring he would finish his current mandate.

=== Crisis in Georgia ===
Following the 2020 Georgian parliamentary election, Georgia experienced a political crisis. The ruling Georgian Dream party was deemed the winner, but the opposition parties said that the election was marred by irregularities and violations, they boycotted the results of the elections and refused to enter the parliament. After Georgian authorities arrested opposition politician Nika Melia, the chairman of the opposition United National Movement (UNM), the country's prime minister resigned and mass street protests ensued.

In March 2021, Michel visited Georgia and participated in talks between Prime Minister Irakli Garibashvili and the opposition. Michel and the EU's High Representative Josep Borrell appointed Swedish diplomat Christian Danielsson as the EU envoy to mediate political crisis talks in the country. Michel also met Georgian Prime Minister Irakli Garibashvili in Brussels later that month, and met political leaders in Tbilisi in April 2021, after an agreement was signed after several weeks of mediation brokered by Michel and the EU. The agreement was welcomed as a success by the international community and local civil society organizations such as the Europe-Georgia Institute, and Michel hailed the agreement as being in "a truly European spirit" that takes Georgia towards a "Euro-Atlantic future." Later the largest opposition party in Tbilisi did not accept the agreement and the ruling party withdrew from it.

=== Russian invasion of Ukraine ===
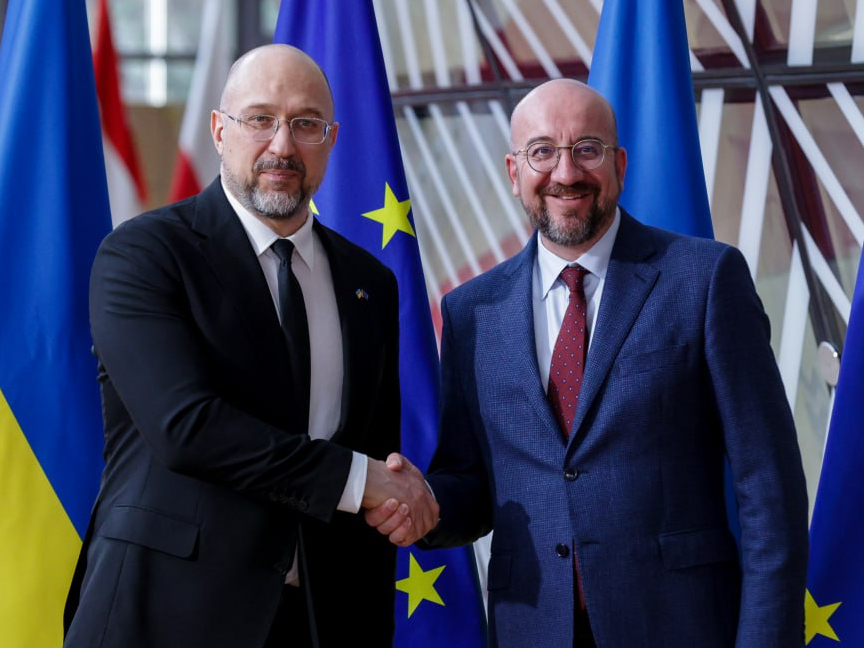
Michel meets Prime Minister of Ukraine Denys Shmyhal in 2024.

Early in the third year of the Russian invasion of Ukraine, roughly 750 days from its start, Michel wrote an op-ed in La Libre in which he advocated for a war-time economy and consequent re-balancing of expenditures. Simultaneously he proposed a Eurobond approach to the problem at a meeting of the European Council, when its presidency was in the hands of Alexander de Croo.

== Honours ==
- Grand Officer in the Order of Leopold (21 May 2014)
- Minister of State (31 October 2019)
- Order of Prince Yaroslav the Wise, 1st class (2021)

== Personal life ==
Michel and his wife Amélie Derbaudrenghien Michel (née Derbaudrenghien) have two children. Amid the COVID-19 pandemic, the couple postponed their wedding, which was supposed to take place in France in August 2020, to avoid quarantine upon return to Belgium. In October 2021, Derbaudrenghien Michel and Michel's spokesman confirmed that the couple discreetly married over the summer of 2021 with a small celebration. Michel also has a son from a previous relationship.

Political offices
| Preceded by Armand De Decker | Minister of Development Cooperation; 2007–2011 | Succeeded by Olivier Chastel |
| Preceded by Elio Di Rupo | Prime Minister of Belgium; 2014–2019 | Succeeded by Sophie Wilmès |
| Preceded by Donald Tusk | President of the European Council; 2019–2024 | Succeeded by António Costa |
Party political offices
| Preceded by Didier Reynders | President of the Reformist Movement; 2011–2014 | Succeeded by Olivier Chastel |
| Preceded by Olivier Chastel | President of the Reformist Movement; 2019 | Succeeded by Georges-Louis Bouchez |
