= Nawal Farih =

Belgian politician (born 1988)

Member of the Chamber of Representatives
- Incumbent
- Assumed office 20 June 2019
- Constituency: Limburg

Personal details
- Born: 19 May 1988 (age 37)
- Party: Christian Democratic and Flemish (since 2018)
- Domestic partner: Sammy Mahdi

Nawal Farih (born 19 May 1988) is a Belgian politician serving as a member of the Chamber of Representatives. She joined Christian Democratic and Flemish in 2018, and has been in a relationship with its leader Sammy Mahdi since 2022. On 1 January 2025 they publicised their engagement to marry.
