= Annick Ponthier =

Flemish politician

Member of the Chamber of Representatives
- Incumbent
- Assumed office 26 May 2019

Personal details
- Born: 24 October 1971 (age 53); Bilzen, Belgium
- Political party: Vlaams Belang

Annick Ponthier (born 21 October 1971) is a Belgian politician who has served as an MP for Vlaams Belang in the Chamber of Representatives since 2019.

She obtained a degree in business translation from the Higher Trade and Language Institute (HHTI) in Genk and worked as a sales executive for a furniture company.

In 2009, Ponthier became a member of the Chamber of Representatives. She continued to hold this position until 2014. In the 2014 elections, she was a candidate for the Flemish Parliament but was not elected. She subsequently became a political assistant for Vlaams Belang. She was also a provincial councilor for the province of Limburg from 2006 to 2009, and has been a municipal councilor of Bilzen since 2007. In addition, she was in 2011, president of the Vlaams Belang in Limburg and a member of the party executive board. In the 2019 elections, Ponthier was the leader of the Limburg Parliamentary List of Vlaams Belang. She was re-elected to the Chamber with nearly 27,500 preference votes.

In 2020, Ponthier received a letter containing a mysterious powder substance along with the VB's leader Tom Van Grieken. She was given police protection as a result.
