= Kim De Witte =

Belgian politician

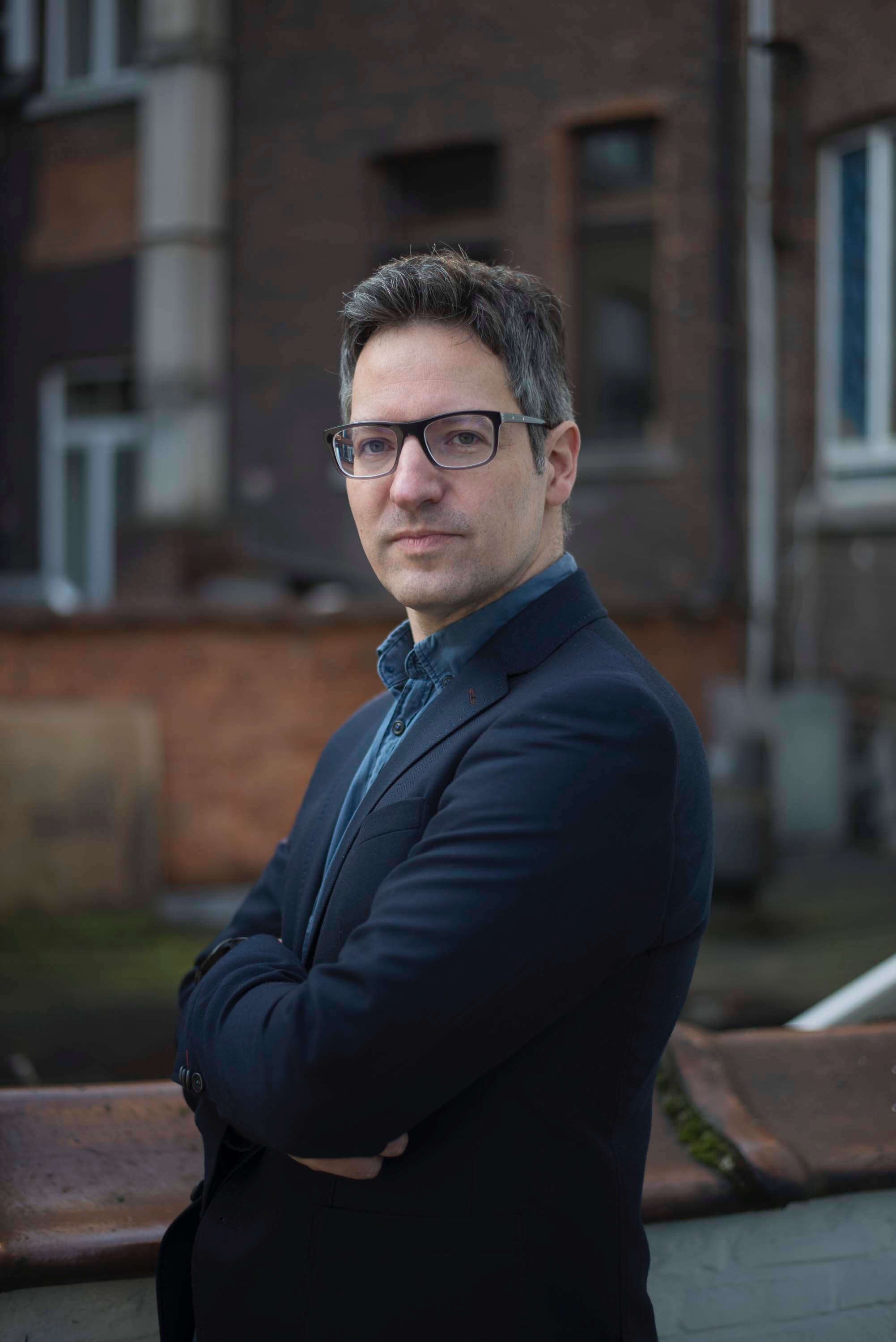

Member of the Hasselt municipal council
- In office 2019–

Member of the Flemish Parliament
- In office 2019–

Personal details
- Born: 29 August 1977 Genk, Belgium
- Party: Workers' Party of Belgium (PVDA)

Kim De Witte (born 29 August 1977) is a Belgian politician who has been a member of the Belgian Federal Parliament since 2024.

De Witte studied law at KU Leuven and went on to practice law, particularly labor and pension law, before becoming a researcher. In 2017 he attained a PhD at KU Leuven.

He authored two books about pensions and work, De grote pensioenroof? (2018) and Ze draaien ons zot (2021).

De Witte stood in the 2014 federal election as the lead candidate for the Workers' Party of Belgium in Limburg. In 2018 he was the lead candidate in the local elections in Hasselt, in which the Workers' Party won two seats. Against the odds, the Workers' Party won a seat in the 2019 Flemish election in Limburg, sending De Witte to the Flemish Parliament. It has been announced he would be the lead candidate for the federal election in 2024; Gaby Colebunders replaced De Witte as lead candidate in the 2024 Flemish election.
