= Verhofstadt III Government =

(Belgium) 2007–2011 Belgian political crisis

Timeline
- 2007 elections
  - 2007–2008 government formation
  - Verhofstadt III (interim)
  - Leterme I
  - Van Rompuy I
  - Leterme II
- 2010 elections
  - 2010–2011 government formation
  - Di Rupo I
  - Sixth state reform
See also
- Brussels-Halle-Vilvoorde
- Partition of Belgium
- State reform in Belgium
- Politics of Belgium
- Cabinet of Belgium

The Verhofstadt III government was an interim Belgian government inaugurated on December 21, 2007 and lasting until 23 March 2008. It was led by Belgian Prime Minister Guy Verhofstadt government and contained representatives from the Open Flemish Liberals and Democrats (Open VLD), Flemish Christian Democrats (CD&V), the Francophone Socialists (PS), the Francophone Liberals (MR) and Francophone Christian Democrats (CDH).

It was succeeded by a permanent government led by CD&V leader Yves Leterme.

== Formation of government ==
When the Parliament confirmed the formation of this interim Government, it had been 196 days since the Belgian people had voted out the previous coalition, the longest period of formation in Belgian history at the time.

== Composition of government ==
The government consisted only of ministers. The composition of the interim Government as decided in the inaugural Council of Ministers is as follows:

Minister	Name	Party
Prime Minister	Guy Verhofstadt	Open VLD
Deputy Prime Minister - Finance and Institutional Reform	Didier Reynders	MR
Deputy Prime Minister - Budget, Mobility and Institutional Reform	Yves Leterme	CD&V
Social Affairs and Public Health	Laurette Onkelinx	PS
Interior	Patrick Dewael	Open VLD
Foreign Affairs	Karel De Gucht	Open VLD
Economy, the Self-employed and Agriculture	Sabine Laruelle	MR
Pensions and Social Integration	Christian Dupont	PS
Employment	Josly Piette	CDH
Justice	Jo Vandeurzen	CD&V
Defence	Pieter De Crem	CD&V
Climate and Energy	Paul Magnette	PS
Development Cooperation	Charles Michel	MR
Civil Service and Public Enterprises	Inge Vervotte	CD&V

The Restricted Council of Ministers (KERN) is the arbitration arm of the executive, which arbitrates disputes within the Government. Under the interim Government, it consists of the Prime Minister and five members of Government representing the five parties in coalition, namely both Deputy Prime Ministers as well as the Minister of Employment, the Minister of Social Affairs and Public Health and the Minister of the Interior.

Under the interim Government deal, it was understood that Yves Leterme will take over the post of Prime Minister no later than 23 March. On March 20, Leterme officially succeeded Verhofstadt and a new government was formed.

== Government declaration ==
The government declaration to which the parties agreed consists of ten points. The main task of the government is to prepare the 2008 budget. Social security benefits will be increased, and businesses will see their shift work costs reduced. A service agreement will be negotiated with the national railway operator. A national security plan is proposed, and the Treaty of Lisbon will see a quick ratification.

== Government policy ==
One of the first actions of the newly installed government was to raise the Belgian security level in response to a possible Islamic terrorist threat.

== See also ==
- 2007–2011 Belgian political crisis
