= Steven Matheï =

Belgian politician (born 1977)

Member of the Chamber of Representatives
- Incumbent
- Assumed office 10 July 2024
- Constituency: Limburg
- In office 17 October 2019 – 16 May 2022
- Preceded by: Wouter Beke
- Succeeded by: Wouter Beke
- Constituency: Limburg

Personal details
- Born: 26 May 1977 (age 48)
- Party: Christian Democratic and Flemish

Steven Matheï (born 26 May 1977) is a Belgian politician. He has been a member of the Chamber of Representatives since 2024, having previously served from 2019 to 2022. In 2013, he was elected mayor of Peer.
