= Olivier Chastel =

Belgian pharmacist and politician (born 1964)

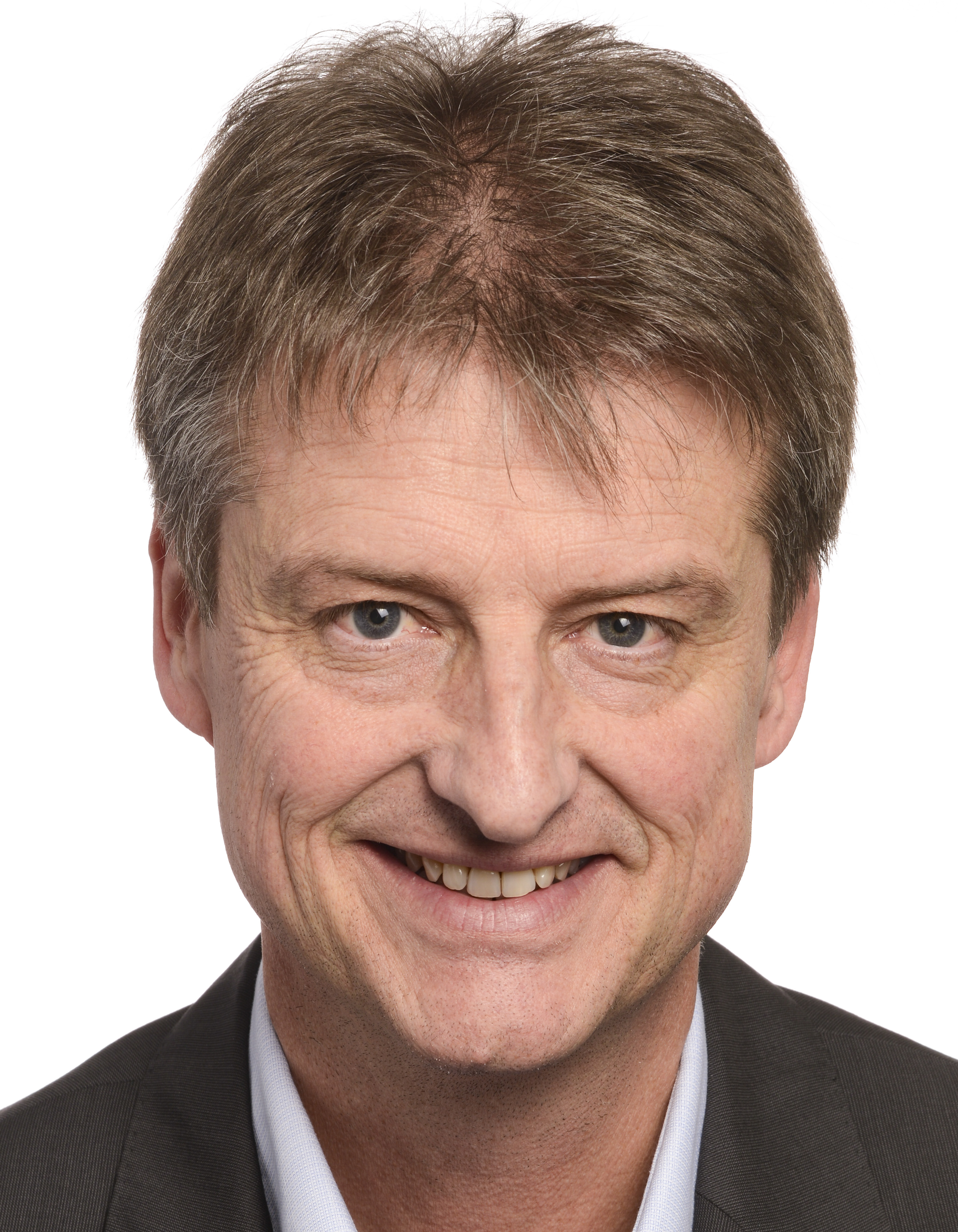
- Official portrait. 2024

Member of the European Parliament for Belgium
- Incumbent
- Assumed office 2019

President of the Mouvement Réformateur
- In office 13 October 2014 – 18 February 2019
- Preceded by: Charles Michel
- Succeeded by: Charles Michel

Federal Minister for Budget and Administrative Simplification
- In office 6 December 2011 – 13 October 2014
- Preceded by: Guy Vanhengel (Budget); Vincent Van Quickenborne (Administrative Simplification)
- Succeeded by: Hervé Jamar (Budget); Theo Francken (Administrative Simplification)

Personal details
- Born: 22 November 1964 (age 61) Liège, Belgium
- Party: Mouvement Réformateur
- Occupation: politician

Olivier Chastel (born 22 November 1964, in Liège) is a Belgian pharmacist and politician of the Liberal Party "Mouvement Réformateur" (MR) who has been serving as a Member of the European Parliament since 2019.

== Early life and education ==
Chastel was born in Liège.

After finishing his studies at the Athénée Royal in Charleroi in 1982, Chastel graduated in Pharmacy at the Université libre de Bruxelles in 1987. For some years, he subsequently worked as a research assistant at the Analytical Chemistry Department at the Pharmacy Institute (ULB). He was a scientific collaborator of the Analysis Laboratory Quality Assistance in Thuin, where he once was head of department and became a specialist in Quality Assurance.

== Political career ==
=== Early beginnings ===
In 1998, Chastel scaled back his professional activities and became involved with local politics, combining this new challenge with his passion for tennis and for breeding the Flanders Cattle Dog "Bouvier des Flandres".

Since 1993, Chastel has been a city councillor in Charleroi and in 1998, he joined the Parliament of Wallonia, in substitution for Étienne Knoops.

=== Member of the Belgian Parliament, 1999–2019 ===
A few months later, Chastel headed the liberal list for the Chamber of Representatives in the Charleroi – Thuin district. In the 1999 Belgian federal election, he obtained 12,000 votes and started his federal career. During his time in parliament, he served on the Committee on Infrastructure and in the SABENA inquiry. As the president of the Petitions Commission, he supported the tasks of the Federal Ombudsmen, charged with the simplification of the relations between the authorities and citizens. In the 2003 elections, Chastel obtained 22,133 preferential votes in the canton of Hainaut and became vice-president of the Chamber of Representatives.

From February until July 2004, Chastel briefly held the position of minister of arts, literature and audiovisual matters in the French Community of Belgium.

On the city level, Chastel obtained more than 17,000 votes in the 2006 local elections.

In the 2007 Belgian federal election, Chastel also headed the list for the Chamber of Representatives for the canton of Hainaut. At this occasion, the MR obtained 199,859 votes in the canton of Hainaut, which was a gain of 40,000 votes compared to 2003. The votes increased by 5% and 27%, which is the largest score the MR had ever reached in the Hainaut. But these exceptional results also allowed the MR to win a sixth seat in the Chamber of Representatives. Chastel, for his part, tripled his score of 2003. With his 67,180 preferential votes, he obtained the second best score for the MR in the Chamber.

On 20 March 2008, Chastel was appointed State Secretary for European Affairs in the government of Prime Minister Herman Van Rompuy. In the 2009 European elections, he was the 3rd on the list led by Louis Michel; he obtained 74,616 preferential votes but did not get a seat in the European Parliament.

In the 2010 elections, Chastel was confirmed as a representative in the Chamber of Representatives. After a successful Belgian presidency of the Council of the European Union, he was appointed by Prime Minister Yves Leterme as Minister of Development Cooperation, charged with European Affairs, in February 2011. He succeeded Charles Michel who was elected as President of the Mouvement Réformateur.

From 2011 until 2014, Chastel served as minister for budget and administrative simplification in the government of Prime Minister Elio Di Rupo.

=== Member of the European Parliament, 2019–present ===
Since the 2019 European Parliament election, Chastel has been one of the vice-chairs of the Parliament’s Committee on Budgets. In this capacity, he served as his parliamentary group’s lead negotiator on the budget of the European Union for 2022 and on a controversial 2023 proposal to rent 15,000 square meters of office space for the European Parliament in Strasbourg from the French government. He is also a member of the Committee on Economic and Monetary Affairs.

In addition to his committee assignments, Chastel is part of the Parliament’s delegations for relations with the Maghreb countries and the Arab Maghreb Union as well as to the Parliamentary Assembly of the Union for the Mediterranean. He is also a member of the European Parliament Intergroup on Artificial Intelligence and Digital, the European Parliament Intergroup on Children’s Rights, the European Parliament Intergroup on LGBT Rights, the European Parliament Intergroup on Small and Medium-Sized Enterprises (SMEs), and the Spinelli Group.

== Overview ==
- 1988–1993: acting city councillor in Charleroi
- Since 1993: city councillor in Charleroi
- December 2006 - May 2007: 1st alderman in Charleroi (economics, work, markets and social economy).
- 1991–1995: acting representative for Daniel DUCARME (Chamber – Charleroi district)
- 1995–1998: 1st acting representative for Etienne KNOOPS (Walloon Parliament – Charleroi district)
- 1998–1999: representative for the French Community and the Walloon Parliament (Charleroi district)
- 1999 - June 2003: federal representative (Charleroi – Thuin district)
- June 2003 - February 2004: federal representative (Hainaut), vice-president of the Chamber of Representatives
- February 2004 - July 2004: minister of arts, literature and audiovisual matters in the French community government Wallonia-Brussels
- July 2004 - March 2008: federal representative (Hainaut), vice-president of the Chamber of Representatives, and of the Commission: Infrastructure, Communications and Public Enterprises
- March 2008: state secretary for European affairs
- Since February 2011: minister of development cooperation, charged with European Affairs

== Recognition ==
- Knight in the Order of Leopold since June 2007 (A.R. 05-06-2007)
- Knight in the Order of the Cross of Terra Mariana of the Republic of Estonia since June 2008
- Commander in the Order of Leopold II since June 2010 (A.R. 06-06-2010)
- Middle Cross with the star in the Order of Merit of the Republic of Hungary since September 2011
- Grand-Cross in the Order of Civil Merit of the Kingdom of Spain since September 2011
