= Houthalen-Helchteren =

- Municipality
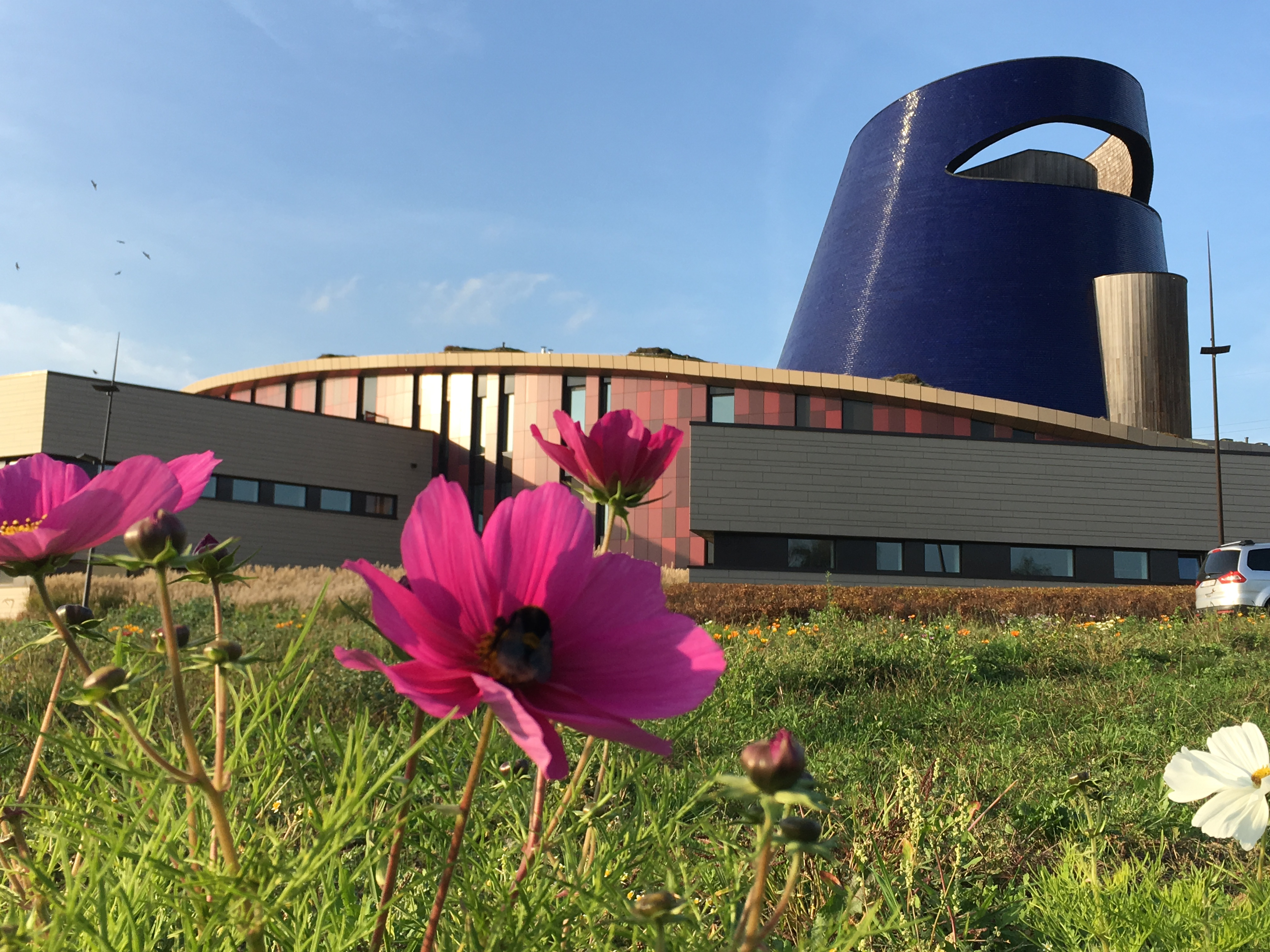

- Flag Coat of arms

- Location of Houthalen-Helchteren in Limburg
- Interactive map of Houthalen-Helchteren
- Location in Belgium
- Coordinates: 51°02′N 05°23′E
- Country: Belgium
- Community: Flemish Community
- Region: Flemish Region
- Province: Limburg
- Arrondissement: Maaseik

Government
  - Mayor: Alain Yzermans
  - Governing party: Vooruit-Groen-CD&V

Area
  - Total: 78.23 km^{2} (30.20 sq mi)

Population (2018-01-01)
  - Total: 30,623
  - Density: 391.4/km^{2} (1,014/sq mi)
- Postal codes: 3530
- NIS code: 72039
- Area codes: 011, 089
- Website: www.houthalen-helchteren.be

Houthalen-Helchteren (Dutch pronunciation: [ˈɦʌutˌɦaːlə(n) ˈɦɛl(ə)xtərə(n)]; Limburgish: Hôtele-Helichtre) is a municipality located in the Belgian province of Limburg. Houthalen-Helchteren consists of Houthalen-centrum, Houthalen-Oost, Helchteren, Sonnis, Laak, Meulenberg and Lillo. On 1 January 2020, Houthalen-Helchteren had a total population of around 30,000. The total area is 78.27 km² which gives a population density of 389 inhabitants per km².

== Geography ==
Houthalen-Helchteren is located near the watershed between the Meuse and the Scheldt. In the immediate vicinity the Dommel (which flows to the Meuse near Den Bosch), the Grote Nete (which flows to the Scheldt) and the Neer (that joins the Meuse just south of Roermond) all originate.

== History of Helchteren ==
Helchteren could have become famous in 1702 when, during the War of the Spanish Succession, a French Army under Boufflers faced an alliance army under Marlborough. A battle could have ensued, but instead it came to the not so famous cannonade of Helchteren. The cannonade itself is however a rare occurring event in military history.

== Notable people ==
- Ingrid Daubechies (born in Houthalen on 17 August 1954) physicist and mathematician.
- Nemo (Belgian band) was founded here in 1991.
- Divock Origi (raised in Houthalen) professional footballer.
- Thomas Strauven (born on 4 April 2008) racing driver.
