= Wouter Raskin =

Belgian politician (born 1972)

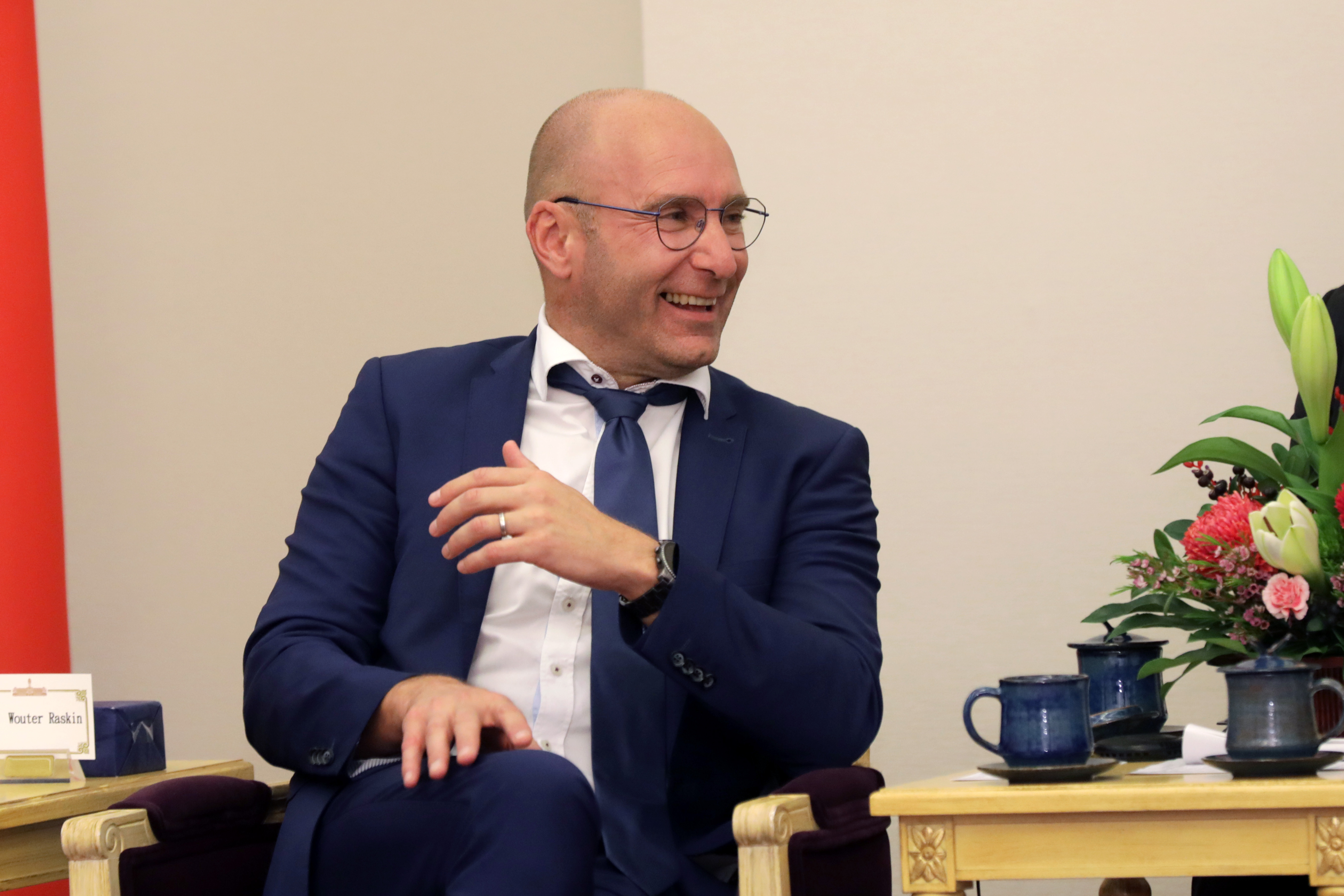
- Wouter Raskin in 2019

Member of the Chamber of Representatives
- Incumbent
- Assumed office 2014

Personal details
- Born: 1972 (age 53–54) Bilzen
- Citizenship: Belgium
- Party: New Flemish Alliance (N-VA)

Wouter Raskin (born 4 January 1972, in Bilzen) is a Belgian-Flemish politician and a member of the New Flemish Alliance party.

== Biography ==
Raskin was born in Bilzen and studied economics at Hasselt University. He then worked as a coordinator for a social economic company in Sint-Truiden and became an advisor to the N-VA in 2010. In the 2014 Belgian federal election, he was elected to the Belgian Chamber of Representatives for the Limburg constituency. In 2019, he was re-elected to the Chamber on second place on the Limburg list.
