= Dieter Keuten =

Belgian politician

Member of the Chamber of Representatives
- Incumbent
- Assumed office 2024

Personal details
- Born: Dieter Keuten; 25 May 1988 (age 38) Diest, Belgium
- Party: Vlaams Belang
- Other political affiliations: Lijst Dedecker (2008–2018); New Flemish Alliance (2018–2023)
- Education: Vrije Universiteit Brussel

Dieter Keuten (born 25 May 1988 in Diest) is a Belgian politician affiliated to the Vlaams Belang party who has been a deputy in the Belgian Chamber of Representatives since 2024.

== Biography ==
Keuten studied applied economics and political science at the Vrije Universiteit Brussel. From 2011 to 2012 he was the Brussels chairman of the liberal LVSV student organization. After leaving university, he worked in marketing and as an e-commerce specialist for various companies.

Keuten was first active in the Lijst Dedecker party and served on the national board of its youth-wing the Jong Libertairen. In the 2012 Belgian municipal elections, he stood in Beringen for the Lijst Dedecker before moving to Antwerp. He joined the New Flemish Alliance party in 2018 and was briefly active for the party in Berchem before moving to Tessenderlo. In 2023 he joined Vlaams Belang. During the 2024 Belgian federal election he was elected as a representative for Vlaams Belang for the Limburg constituency.
