= Frank Troosters =

Belgian politician

Member of the Chamber of Representatives
- Incumbent
- Assumed office 2019

Personal details
- Born: Frank Troosters; 8 November 1970 (age 54); Hasselt, Belgium
- Political party: Vlaams Belang

Frank Troosters (born 8 November 1970) is a Belgian politician for Vlaams Belang and a member of the Chamber of Representatives.

Troosters is a city councilor for Vlaams Belang in Hasselt and leads the local faction of the party there. In 2018, Troosters opposed the construction of a new mosque in Hasselt and in 2020, led a protest with VB leader Tom Van Grieken against turning a hotel in the district into a refugee and migrant housing centre. Troosters has also been an MP in the federal parliament for the Limburg constituency since 2019.
