= Frieda Gijbels =

Belgian politician (born 1975)

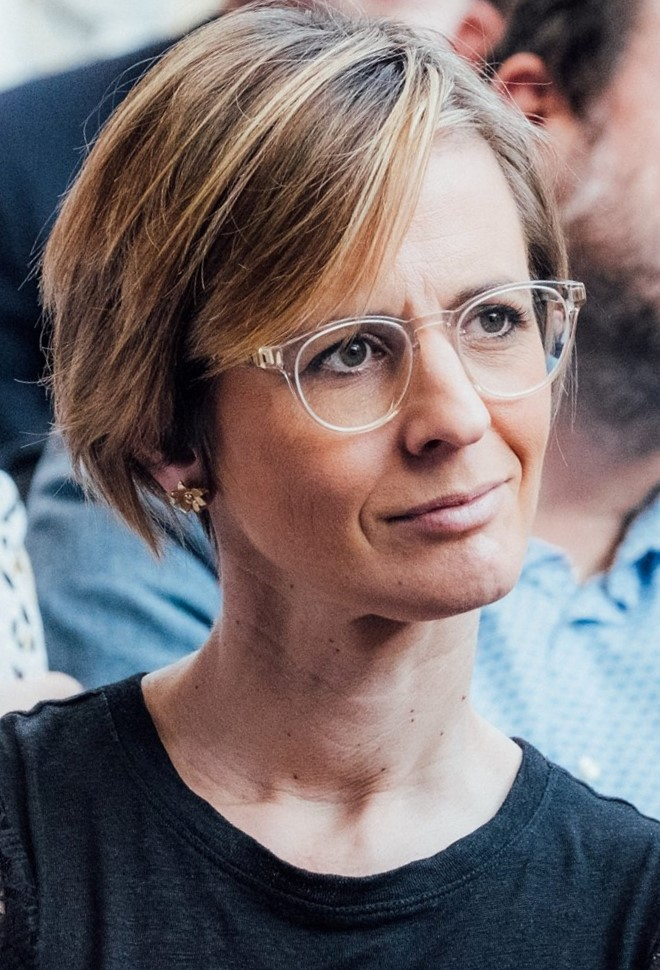

Member of the Chamber of Representatives
- Incumbent
- Assumed office 2019

Personal details
- Born: 1975 (age 50–51) Bree
- Citizenship: Belgium
- Party: New Flemish Alliance (N-VA)

Frieda Gijbels (born 1975) is a Belgian politician and a member of the Flemish N-VA party.

== Biography ==
Gijbels studied dentistry at the KULeuven and specialized in periodontics. In 2003 she became a dentist-periodontist and also obtained a doctorate in medical sciences. She is the founder of a periodontology practice in Oudsbergen. In the 2019 Belgian federal election, she was elected to the Member of the Chamber of Representatives on third place on the Limburg constituency list.
