= Johan Vande Lanotte =

Belgian politician (born 1955)

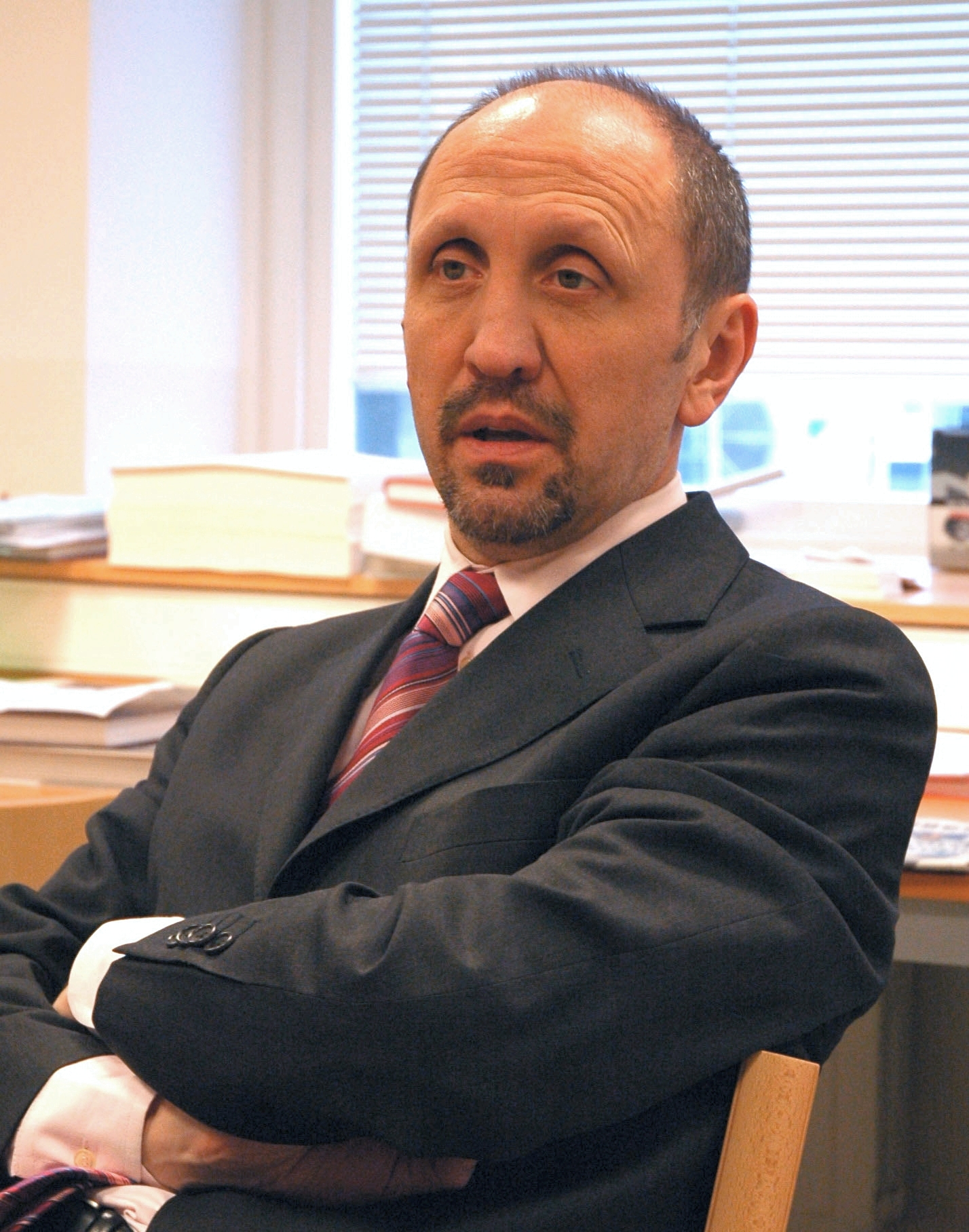

Deputy Prime Minister
- In office 5 December 2011 – October 2014

of Economy, Consumer affairs and North Sea
- In office 5 December 2011 – October 2014

Senator
- In office 28 June 2007 – 5 December 2011

Chairperson of SP.A
- In office 2005–2007
- Preceded by: Steve Stevaert
- Succeeded by: Caroline Gennez

Deputy Prime Minister
- In office 1994–2005

Minister of Budget
- In office 1999–2005

Minister of the Interior and of Civil Service Affairs
- In office 1994–1998

Personal details
- Born: 6 July 1955 (age 71) Poperinge, Belgium
- Party: SP.A
- Education: University of Antwerp; University of Brussels (VUB)
- Occupation: Politician; Professor
- Website: Official website

Johan Cyrille Corneel Vande Lanotte (born 6 July 1955) is a Belgian politician. He is a member of the SP.A, and became its party president on 15 October 2005. He handed down his leadership positions after the SP.A lost in the 2007 general election. Between 1995 and 2014, he served more than 13 years as Deputy Prime Minister, the longest period for a Flemish socialist after WW II. In his last term he served as the Minister of Economy, Consumer affairs and North Sea in the Di Rupo I Government. With the formation of a new Centre-Right federal government, which excluded his party, Johan Vande Lanotte returned to local politics in October 2014 in Ostend, where he took up his position as alderman for the economy and tourism at Ostend City Council. From August 2015 until the end of 2018 Vande Lanotte was the mayor of Ostend. During his political career he continued to work as a professor at the University of Ghent, specialized in Constitutional Law and Human Rights. Since 2019, he is a lawyer (senior legal advisor) in the law office Van Steenbrugge in Gent. He was the initiator of the Turkey Tribunal held in Geneva in September 2021. Vande Lanotte also published one of the six reports of the Turkey Tribunal entitled "Crimes Against Humanity under the Rome Statute in Turkey Today".

== Studies ==
In 1978 he graduated magna cum laude in Political and Social Sciences, option: Sociology (Master's degree) from the University of Antwerp. In 1981 he added, again magna cum laude, a master in Law at the Vrije Universiteit Brussel.

He graduated as Doctor in Law at the Ghent University in 1986. The subject of his dissertation was decentralisation in the Belgian political context. It was awarded with the Prize of the Belgian Institute for Administrative Sciences.

During his doctorate, he studied at the Swiss Institute of Comparative Law (Lausanne) with the Von Calcken scholarship of the Council of Europe, at the Lille University (France), the Leiden University (Netherlands) and the Université de Sherbrooke in Quebec.

== Curriculum ==
=== Professional ===
- 1978–1981: City of Ghent administration.
- 1982–1983: assistant at the department of Political and Social Sciences of the University of Antwerp.
- 1983–1987: assistant at the Law department of the Ghent University.
- 1986: apprentice lawyer in Ghent.
- 1987–1990: assistant auditor and auditor at the Council of State (Belgium)
- since 1988: part-time professor public law at the Ghent University
- 1988–1991: part-time professor public law at the Ghent University, combined with a part-time professorship at the Vrije Universiteit Brussel.
- since 1991: part-time professor public law at the Ghent University, combined
- 2010–2012: president of the non-governmental organization Coastal & Marine Union (EUCC)

=== Political ===
- 1988–1991: Chief of cabinet of the Minister of the Interior
- 1991–1994: Member of Parliament
- 1994–1995: Minister of the Interior and of Civil Service Affairs
- 1995–1998: Deputy Prime Minister and Minister of the Interior
- 1998–1999: Member of Parliament
- 1999–2003: Deputy Prime Minister and Minister of Budget, Social Integration and Social Economy
- 2003–2005: Deputy Prime Minister and Minister of Budget and Public Enterprises
- 2005–2007: SP.a party president
- 2005–2007: Member of Parliament
- Since 2006: Minister of State (honorary title)
- 2007–2011: Senator
- 2011–2014: Deputy Prime Minister and Minister of Economy, Consumer affairs and North Sea
- 2015–2018: mayor of Ostend
- 2018–present: Senior Legal Counsel-Lawyer
