= Frank Vandenbroucke (politician) =

Belgian politician

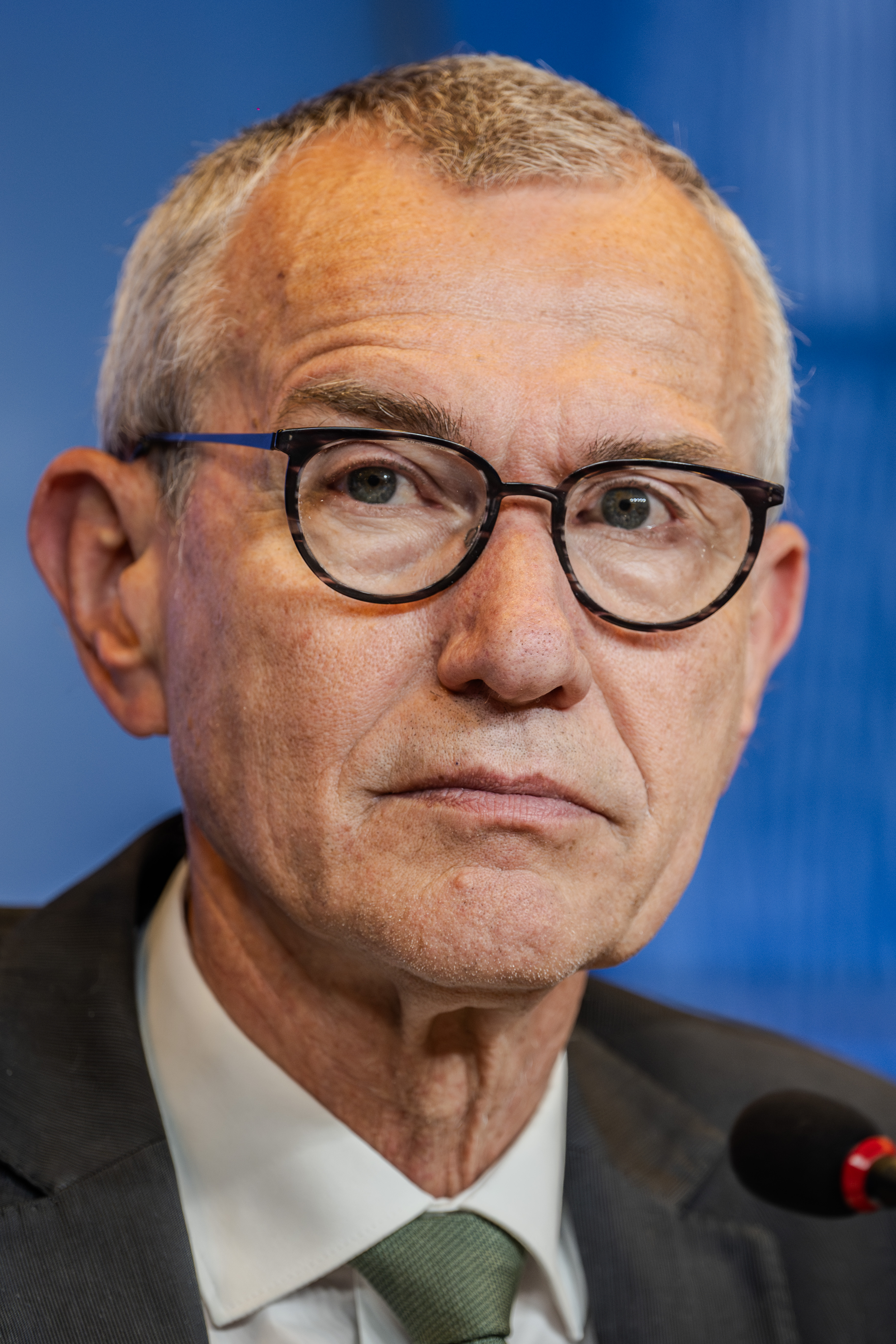
- Vandenbroucke in 2024

Deputy Prime Minister of Belgium
- Incumbent
- Assumed office 1 October 2020
- Prime Minister: Alexander De Croo; Bart De Wever

Minister of Health and Social Affairs
- Incumbent
- Assumed office 1 October 2020
- Prime Minister: Alexander De Croo; Bart De Wever
- Preceded by: Maggie De Block

Minister of Foreign Affairs
- In office 10 October 1994 – 22 March 1995
- Prime Minister: Jean-Luc Dehaene
- Preceded by: Willy Claes
- Succeeded by: Erik Derycke

Minister of Social Affairs
- In office 12 July 1999 – 12 July 2003
- Prime Minister: Guy Verhofstadt
- Preceded by: Magda De Galan
- Succeeded by: Rudy Demotte

Minister of Pensions
- In office 12 July 1999 – 20 July 2004
- Prime Minister: Guy Verhofstadt
- Preceded by: Jan Peeters
- Succeeded by: Bruno Tobback

Minister of Employment
- In office 12 July 2003 – 20 July 2004
- Prime Minister: Guy Verhofstadt
- Preceded by: Laurette Onkelinx
- Succeeded by: Freya Van den Bossche

Flemish Minister of Education
- In office 20 July 2004 – 13 July 2009
- Preceded by: Marleen Vanderpoorten
- Succeeded by: Pascal Smet

Personal details
- Born: Frank Ignace Georgette Vandenbroucke; 21 October 1955 (age 70) Leuven, Belgium
- Party: Vooruit
- Other political affiliations: Radical Workers' League (RAL) (1970s)
- Education: Katholieke Universiteit Leuven; University of Cambridge; University of Oxford
- Occupation: Politician; Public servant; Professor
- Website: www.frankvandenbroucke.uva.nl/en_GB/

Frank Ignace Georgette Vandenbroucke (Dutch: [ˈfrɑŋk fɑndə(m)ˈbrukə]; (Note: Surname in isolation: [vɑndə(m)ˈbrukə].) born 21 October 1955) is a Belgian-Flemish academic and politician of Vooruit who has been serving as Deputy Prime Minister and Minister of Health and Social Affairs in both the De Croo government as well as the De Wever government since 2020.

== Early life and education ==
Vandenbroucke was born in Leuven. His father, Jozue Vandenbroucke (1914–1987), was vice-rector of the Katholieke Universiteit Leuven (medicine).

Vandenbroucke attended Sint-Pieterscollege in Leuven for his secondary education. He started his academic studies at the Katholieke Universiteit Leuven. Starting with an undergraduate degree in Economics, he continued and got a master's degree in economics from the same alma mater in 1978. After this he got a MPhil in Economics from Cambridge University (1981–82).

== Career in academia ==
After graduating from the KUL, Vandenbroucke became a research assistant at the "Centrum voor Economische Studiën" at the KUL (1978–80). In 1982 he became a staff member of SEVI, the research department of the SP (1982–85).

In 1999 Vandenbroucke received a D.Phil. from the Faculty of Social Studies, Oxford University. His thesis "Social Justice and Individual Ethics in an Open Society: Equality, Responsibility, and Incentives" (Ethical Economy) was published in March 2001 by Springer publications.

Since 2009 Vandenbroucke took on academic positions at the University of Antwerp (professor of Social Economic Analysis, Herman Deleeck Centre for Social Policy), the Katholieke Universiteit Leuven (KUL), and the University of Amsterdam (professor at the Den Uyl Chair at the Faculty of Social and Behavioural Sciences). He is guest professor at the College of Europe in Bruges.

Vandenbroucke's academic interests focus on social systems and welfare policies. At EU level, he was active in outlining the Open Method of Coordination among Member States to support the enactment of the 2000 Lisbon Strategy. He later worked for the introduction of a 'horizontal social clause' in the Lisbon Treaty (today's art. 9 TFEU) to provide a stronger legal basis for welfare policies in the EU.

== Political career ==
In 1985 Vandenbroucke was elected to the Belgian Chamber of People's Representatives and was re-elected in 1987, 1991 and 1995. In 1989 the 34-year-old Vandenbroucke became chairman of the SP, a post he held until 1994, when he became Deputy Prime Minister and Minister of Foreign Affairs (1994–95). From 1995 to 1996 Vandenbroucke was the leader of the Parliamentary Group of the SP.

In 1995 Vandenbroucke had to resign as foreign minister and in 1996 he also resigned from parliament due to his involvement in the Agusta scandal. He acknowledged that he was confronted with two million francs which came as bribery money from the Italian helicopter builder Agusta. Refusing to have anything to do with the money, he advised to "have the money burned". Vandenbroucke was never prosecuted but took a voluntary sabbatical at Oxford (1996–99).

After the 1999 Belgian general election Vandenbroucke returned to politics to become Minister of Social Affairs and Pensions (1999–2003). After the 2003 elections he became Minister for Employment and Pensions (2003–04).

After the 2004 regional elections, Vandenbroucke left the federal government for the Flemish Government to become Vice-Minister-President of the Flemish Government and Flemish Minister for Work, Education and Training (2004–09). The 2009 regional elections was a sudden and unexpected turning point in his career. Although Vandenbroucke gained a large number of preference votes in his home province of Flemish Brabant, the president of his party, Caroline Gennez, chose not to give him the opportunity to continue his work as Minister, mentioning political as well as character dissimilarities. Instead, he was succeeded by Pascal Smet for Education and by Philippe Muyters for Work. At that time, Vandenbroucke remained member of the Flemish Parliament and accepted a teaching position at the University of Antwerp.

In 2010, Vandenbroucke participated in the general elections, running for the Belgian Senate. During the campaign, Vandenbroucke outed his concerns about the social-institutional reforms that the pre-electorally dominating Flemish nationalist party New Flemish Alliance wanted to achieve. Although his party maintained its position with the outcome of the elections, Vandenbroucke gained a relatively large number of preference votes.

He has been member of the Flemish Parliament (2009) and of the Belgian Senate (2010), and was awarded by King Albert II of Belgium of the title of Minister of State (2009). In October 2011 he left all political posts to focus on academic research.

In April 2013 he became a member and president of Belgium's "Commission de réforme des pensions 2020–40" at the request of the federal ministers responsible for pensions, Alexander De Croo and Sabine Laruelle. Composed of twelve experts, this commission was tasked to prepare, independently and in a closed circle, future pension reforms, in order to further improve the social and financial sustainability of the Belgian pension system.

After being ten years out of politics on 1 October 2020 on behalf of Conner Rousseau, Vandenbroucke joined the De Croo Government as Deputy Prime Minister and Minister of Health and Social Affairs. He was unelected, as he did not appear on any voting lists.
