= Erik Gilissen =

Flemish politician

Member of the Chamber of Representatives
- Incumbent
- Assumed office 2019

Personal details
- Born: Erik Gilissen; 19 September 1968 (age 58) Bilzen, Belgium
- Party: Vlaams Belang

Erik Gilissen (born 19 September 1968) is a Belgian-Flemish politician for Vlaams Belang.

Gilissen worked as an IT manager and a software developer for company in Heusden. He has been a municipal councilor in Beringen for Vlaams Belang since January 2019. In the 2019 federal elections, Gilissen was also elected to the Chamber of Representatives from third place on the Limburg VB list.
