= Christian Dupont =

Belgian politician

- Born: 1947 (age 78–79); Gosselies, Belgium
- Occupation: politician

Christian Dupont (born in 1947) is a Belgian politician, member of the French-speaking Socialist Party. He was Minister for Education in the French Community Government in 2008–2009. Prior to that, he was Federal Belgian Minister of Pensions and Social Integration in the Verhofstadt III government from December 2007 until March 2008. He was also member of the Belgian Chamber of Representatives (52nd legislature).
