= Peter Vanvelthoven =

Belgian politician (born 1962)

Peter Vanvelthoven Representative
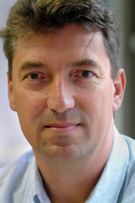
- In office 2007–2011

Personal details
- Born: 22 October 1962 (age 63) Lommel
- Party: SP.A
- Website: http://www.petervanvelthoven.be

Peter Karel Alexander Vanvelthoven (born 22 October 1962) is a Belgian politician and member of the SP.A. He is the son of politician Louis Vanvelthoven. He became the Federal Minister for Employment, charged with the Informatisation of the State, in 2005 after Deputy Prime Minister and Minister of Budget Johan Vande Lanotte left the Federal Government to become the President of the Different Socialist Party (SP.A).

== Political career ==
- 1994-1995: Provincial Councillor of Limburg
- 1995: Permanent Deputy of Limburg
- 1995-1999: Member of the Flemish Parliament for Limburg
- 1999-2003: Member of the Chamber of Representatives for Limburg
- 2003-2005: Secretary of State for the Informatisation of the State, attached to the Minister of Budget and Public Enterprises
- 2005-2008: Federal Minister for Employment and Informatisation
- 2008-2009: Member of the Chamber of Representatives for Limburg and leader of the socialist fraction
- 2009–present: Member of the Flemish Parliament for Limburg and leader of the socialist fraction

== Honours ==
- Belgium: Grand Officer Order of Leopold
- Netherlands: Knight, Order of Orange-Nassau
