= List of members of the Chamber of Representatives of Belgium, 2010–2014 =

This is a list of members of the Belgian Chamber of Representatives during the 53rd legislature (2010–2014), arranged alphabetically.

== Election results (13 June 2010) ==
| Party | Votes | % | +/– | Seats | +/– |
|---|---|---|---|---|---|
| New Flemish Alliance | 1,135,617 | 17.40 | N/A | 27 | +22 |
| Parti Socialiste | 894,543 | 13.70 | +2.84 | 26 | +6 |
| Christen-Democratisch en Vlaams | 707,986 | 10.85 | N/A | 17 | –8 |
| Mouvement Réformateur | 605,617 | 9.28 | –3.24 | 18 | –5 |
| Socialistische Partij Anders | 602,867 | 9.24 | N/A | 13 | –1 |
| Open Vlaamse Liberalen en Democraten | 563,873 | 8.64 | –3.19 | 13 | –5 |
| Vlaams Belang | 506,697 | 7.76 | –4.23 | 12 | –5 |
| Centre démocrate humaniste | 360,441 | 5.52 | –0.53 | 9 | –1 |
| Ecolo | 313,047 | 4.80 | –0.31 | 8 | 0 |
| Groen! | 285,989 | 4.38 | +0.40 | 5 | +1 |
| Lijst Dedecker | 150,577 | 2.31 | –1.72 | 1 | –4 |
| Workers' Party of Belgium | 101,088 | 1.55 | +0.70 | 0 | 0 |
| People's Party | 84,005 | 1.29 | New | 1 | New |
| Wallonie d'Abord | 36,642 | 0.56 | New | 0 | New |
| Rassemblement Wallonie France | 35,743 | 0.55 | +0.15 | 0 | 0 |
| National Front | 33,591 | 0.51 | –1.45 | 0 | –1 |
| Front des gauches | 20,734 | 0.32 | New | 0 | New |
| BELG.UNIE | 20,665 | 0.32 | New | 0 | New |
| Front National+ | 11,553 | 0.18 | New | 0 | New |
| Pro Bruxsel | 7,201 | 0.11 | New | 0 | New |
| Left Socialist Party | 6,791 | 0.10 | New | 0 | New |
| Parti Pensionné PP | 6,688 | 0.10 | New | 0 | New |
| Vivant | 6,211 | 0.10 | +0.01 | 0 | 0 |
| Wallon+ | 5,857 | 0.09 | New | 0 | New |
| EGALITE | 5,670 | 0.09 | New | 0 | New |
| RESPECT | 5,630 | 0.09 | New | 0 | New |
| Mouvement socialiste plus | 2,827 | 0.04 | New | 0 | New |
| MP Éducation | 2,572 | 0.04 | +0.02 | 0 | 0 |
| Vital | 2,259 | 0.03 | +0.01 | 0 | 0 |
| Pirate Party | 2,200 | 0.03 | New | 0 | New |
| Vrijheid | 1,576 | 0.02 | New | 0 | New |
| N | 610 | 0.01 | New | 0 | New |
| Total | 6,527,367 | 100.00 | – | 150 | 0 |
| Valid votes | 6,527,367 | 94.19 | | | |
| Invalid/blank votes | 402,488 | 5.81 | | | |
| Total votes | 6,929,855 | 100.00 | | | |
| Registered voters/turnout | 7,767,552 | 89.22 | | | |
Source: IBZ

== Bureau ==
=== Presidents ===
| Office | Senator | Party |
|---|---|---|
| President | André Flahaut | PS |
| 1st Vicepresident | Ben Weyts | N-VA |
| 2nd Vicepresident | Corinne De Permentier | MR |
| 3rd Vicepresident | Sonja Becq | CD&V |
| 4th Vicepresident | Siegfried Bracke | N-VA |
| 5th Vicepresident | André Frédéric | PS |
| 1st Secretary | Dirk Van der Maelen | sp.a |
| 2nd Secretary | Patrick Dewael | Open Vld |
| 3rd Secretary | Annick Van Den Ende-Chapellier | cdH |
| 4th Secretary | Filip De Man | VB |

=== College of Quaestors ===
| Office | Senator | Party |
|---|---|---|
| 1st Quaestor | Sarah Smeyers | N-VA |
| 2nd Quaestor | Colette Burgeon | PS |
| 3rd Quaestor | Olivier Maingain | FDF |
| 4th Quaestor | Gerald Kindermans | CD&V |

=== Floor leaders ===
| Office | Senator | Party |
|---|---|---|
| N-VA Floor leader | Jan Jambon | N-VA |
| PS Floor leader | André Giet | PS |

== List of representatives ==
| Name | Fraction | Electoral district | Language group |
|---|---|---|---|
| Meyrem Almaci | Groen | Antwerp | Dutch-speaking |
| Gerolf Annemans | Vlaams Belang | Antwerp | Dutch-speaking |
| Daniel Bacquelaine | MR | Liège | French-speaking |
| Ronny Balcaen | Ecolo | Hainaut | French-speaking |
| Sonja Becq | CD&V | Brussels-Halle-Vilvoorde | Dutch-speaking |
| Manu Beuselinck | N-VA | West Flanders | Dutch-speaking |
| Philippe Blanchaert | PS | Hainaut | French-speaking |
| Hendrik Bogaert | CD&V | West Flanders | Dutch-speaking |
| Hans Bonte | sp.a | Brussels-Halle-Vilvoorde | Dutch-speaking |
| Juliette Boulet | Ecolo | Hainaut | French-speaking |
| Siegfried Bracke | N-VA | East Flanders | Dutch-speaking |
| Eva Brems | Groen | Leuven | Dutch-speaking |
| Christian Brotcorne | cdH | Hainaut | French-speaking |
| Colette Burgeon | PS | Hainaut | French-speaking |
| Kristof Calvo | Groen | Antwerp | Dutch-speaking |
| Benoît Cerexhe | cdH | Brussels-Halle-Vilvoorde | French-speaking |
| Olivier Chastel | MR | Hainaut | French-speaking |
| David Clarinval | MR | Namur | French-speaking |
| Bernard Clerfayt | FDF | Brussels-Halle-Vilvoorde | French-speaking |
| Guy Coëme | PS | Liège | French-speaking |
| Alexandra Colen | Vlaams Belang | Antwerp | Dutch-speaking |
| Philippe Collard | MR | Luxembourg | French-speaking |
| Philippe Courard | PS | Luxembourg | French-speaking |
| Michel Daerden | PS | Liège | French-speaking |
| Thiery Damien | FDF | Brussels-Halle-Vilvoorde | French-speaking |
| Maggie De Block | Open VLD | Brussels-Halle-Vilvoorde | Dutch-speaking |
| Rita De Bont | Vlaams Belang | Antwerp | Dutch-speaking |
| Valérie de Bue | MR | Walloon Brabant | French-speaking |
| Stefaan De Clerck | CD&V | West Flanders | Dutch-speaking |
| Mathias De Clercq | Open VLD | East Flanders | Dutch-speaking |
| Pieter De Crem | CD&V | East Flanders | Dutch-speaking |
| Herman De Croo | Open VLD | East Flanders | Dutch-speaking |
| François-Xavier de Donnea | MR | Brussels-Halle-Vilvoorde | French-speaking |
| Filip De Man | Vlaams Belang | Brussels-Halle-Vilvoorde | Dutch-speaking |
| Ingeborg De Meulemeester | N-VA | East Flanders | Dutch-speaking |
| Corinne De Permentier | MR | Brussels-Halle-Vilvoorde | French-speaking |
| Minneke De Ridder | N-VA | Antwerp | Dutch-speaking |
| Wouter De Vriendt | Groen | West Flanders | Dutch-speaking |
| Sophie De Wit | N-VA | Antwerp | Dutch-speaking |
| Jean-Marie Dedecker | LDD | West Flanders | Dutch-speaking |
| Peter Dedecker | N-VA | East Flanders | Dutch-speaking |
| Koenraad Degroote | N-VA | West Flanders | Dutch-speaking |
| Olivier Deleuze | Ecolo | Brussels-Halle-Vilvoorde | French-speaking |
| Jean-Marc Delizée | PS | Namur | French-speaking |
| Zuhal Demir | N-VA | Antwerp | Dutch-speaking |
| Els Demol | N-VA | Leuven | Dutch-speaking |
| Rudy Demotte | PS | Hainaut | French-speaking |
| Valérie Déom | PS | Namur | French-speaking |
| Maya Detiège | sp.a | Antwerp | Dutch-speaking |
| Laurent Devin | PS | Hainaut | French-speaking |
| Carl Devries | CD&V | Leuven | Dutch-speaking |
| Patrick Dewael | Open VLD | Limburg | Dutch-speaking |
| Elio Di Rupo | PS | Hainaut | French-speaking |
| Leen Dierick | CD&V | East Flanders | Dutch-speaking |
| Denis Ducarme | MR | Hainaut | French-speaking |
| Antony Dufrane | PS | Hainaut | French-speaking |
| Daphné Dumery | N-VA | West Flanders | Dutch-speaking |
| Guy D'haeseleer | Vlaams Belang | East Flanders | Dutch-speaking |
| Julie Fernandez-Fernandez | PS | Liège | French-speaking |
| André Flahaut | PS | Walloon Brabant | French-speaking |
| Catherine Fonck | cdH | Hainaut | French-speaking |
| Theo Francken | N-VA | Leuven | Dutch-speaking |
| André Frédéric | PS | Liège | French-speaking |
| Jacqueline Galant | MR | Hainaut | French-speaking |
| Caroline Gennez | sp.a | Antwerp | Dutch-speaking |
| Zoé Genot | Ecolo | Brussels-Halle-Vilvoorde | French-speaking |
| Muriel Gerkens | Ecolo | Liège | French-speaking |
| Georges Gilkinet | Ecolo | Namur | French-speaking |
| Philippe Goffin | MR | Liège | French-speaking |
| Hagen Goyvaerts | Vlaams Belang | Leuven | Dutch-speaking |
| Karolien Grosemans | N-VA | Limburg | Dutch-speaking |
| Kattrin Jadin | MR | Liège | French-speaking |
| Eric Jadot | Ecolo | Liège | French-speaking |
| Jan Jambon | N-VA | Antwerp | Dutch-speaking |
| Patrick Janssens | sp.a | Antwerp | Dutch-speaking |
| Gerald Kindermans | CD&V | Limburg | Dutch-speaking |
| Emir Kir | PS | Brussels-Halle-Vilvoorde | French-speaking |
| Meryame Kitir | sp.a | Limburg | Dutch-speaking |
| Sabine Lahaye Battheu | Open VLD | West Flanders | Dutch-speaking |
| Renaat Landuyt | sp.a | West Flanders | Dutch-speaking |
| Nahima Lanjri | CD&V | Antwerp | Dutch-speaking |
| Marie-Claire Lambert | PS | Liège | French-speaking |
| Sabine Laruelle | MR | Namur | French-speaking |
| Mauro Lenzini | PS | Liège | French-speaking |
| Yves Leterme | CD&V | West Flanders | Dutch-speaking |
| Peter Logghe | Vlaams Belang | West Flanders | Dutch-speaking |
| Laurent Louis | Parti Populaire | Walloon Brabant | French-speaking |
| Benoît Lutgen | cdH | Luxembourg | French-speaking |
| Peter Luykx | N-VA | Limburg | Dutch-speaking |
| Bert Maertens | N-VA | West Flanders | Dutch-speaking |
| Olivier Maingain | FDF | Brussels-Halle-Vilvoorde | French-speaking |
| Marie-Christine Marghem | MR | Hainaut | French-speaking |
| Alain Mathot | PS | Liège | French-speaking |
| Yvan Mayeur | PS | Brussels-Halle-Vilvoorde | French-speaking |
| Charles Michel | MR | Walloon Brabant | French-speaking |
| Joëlle Milquet | cdH | Brussels-Halle-Vilvoorde | French-speaking |
| Patrick Moriau | PS | Hainaut | French-speaking |
| Nathalie Muylle | CD&V | West Flanders | Dutch-speaking |
| Laurette Onkelinx | PS | Brussels-Halle-Vilvoorde | French-speaking |
| Ozlem Ozen | PS | Hainaut | French-speaking |
| Barbara Pas | Vlaams Belang | East Flanders | Dutch-speaking |
| Charles Picqué | PS | Brussels-Halle-Vilvoorde | French-speaking |
| Isabelle Poncelet | cdH | Luxembourg | French-speaking |
| Annick Ponthier | Vlaams Belang | Limburg | Dutch-speaking |
| Maxime Prévot | cdH | Namur | French-speaking |
| Didier Reynders | MR | Liège | French-speaking |
| Gwendolyn Rutten | Open VLD | Leuven | Dutch-speaking |
| Willem-Frederik Schiltz | Open VLD | Antwerp | Dutch-speaking |
| Bert Schoofs | Vlaams Belang | Limburg | Dutch-speaking |
| Franco Seminara | PS | Hainaut | French-speaking |
| Marie-Dominique Simonet | cdH | Liège | French-speaking |
| Sarah Smeyers | N-VA | East Flanders | Dutch-speaking |
| Nadia Sminate | N-VA | Brussels-Halle-Vilvoorde | Dutch-speaking |
| Thérèse Snoy | Ecolo | Walloon Brabant | French-speaking |
| Bart Somers | Open VLD | Antwerp | Dutch-speaking |
| Ine Somers | Open VLD | East Flanders | Dutch-speaking |
| Karin Temmerman | sp.a | East Flanders | Dutch-speaking |
| Raf Terwingen | CD&V | Limburg | Dutch-speaking |
| Eric Thiebaut | PS | Hainaut | French-speaking |
| Bruno Tobback | sp.a | Leuven | Dutch-speaking |
| Annemie Turtelboom | Open VLD | Antwerp | Dutch-speaking |
| Bruno Tuybens | sp.a | East Flanders | Dutch-speaking |
| Karel Uyttersprot | N-VA | East Flanders | Dutch-speaking |
| Bruno Valkeniers | Vlaams Belang | Antwerp | Dutch-speaking |
| Jef Van den Bergh | CD&V | Antwerp | Dutch-speaking |
| Liesbeth Van der Auwera | CD&V | Limburg | Dutch-speaking |
| Dirk Van der Maelen | sp.a | East Flanders | Dutch-speaking |
| Miranda Van Eetvelde | N-VA | East Flanders | Dutch-speaking |
| Jan Van Esbroeck | N-VA | Antwerp | Dutch-speaking |
| Stefaan Van Hecke | Groen | East Flanders | Dutch-speaking |
| Reinilde Van Moer | N-VA | Antwerp | Dutch-speaking |
| Flor Van Noppen | N-VA | Antwerp | Dutch-speaking |
| Vincent Van Quickenborne | Open VLD | West Flanders | Dutch-speaking |
| Carina Van Tittelboom-Van Cauter | Open VLD | East Flanders | Dutch-speaking |
| Kristien Van Vaerenbergh | N-VA | Brussels-Halle-Vilvoorde | Dutch-speaking |
| Steven Vanackere | CD&V | Brussels-Halle-Vilvoorde | Dutch-speaking |
| Steven Vandeput | N-VA | Limburg | Dutch-speaking |
| Guy Vanhengel | Open VLD | Brussels-Halle-Vilvoorde | Dutch-speaking |
| Ann Vanheste | sp.a | West Flanders | Dutch-speaking |
| Myriam Vanlerberghe | sp.a | West Flanders | Dutch-speaking |
| Peter Vanvelthoven | sp.a | Limburg | Dutch-speaking |
| Stefaan Vercamer | CD&V | East Flanders | Dutch-speaking |
| Servais Verherstraeten | CD&V | Antwerp | Dutch-speaking |
| Inge Vervotte | CD&V | Antwerp | Dutch-speaking |
| Tanguy Veys | Vlaams Belang | East Flanders | Dutch-speaking |
| Christiane Vienne | PS | Hainaut | French-speaking |
| Melchior Wathelet, Jr. | cdH | Liège | French-speaking |
| Ben Weyts | N-VA | Brussels-Halle-Vilvoorde | Dutch-speaking |
| Bert Wollants | N-VA | Antwerp | Dutch-speaking |
| Veerle Wouters | N-VA | Limburg | Dutch-speaking |

== By electoral district ==
=== Dutch- and French-speaking ===
==== Brussels-Halle-Vilvoorde (22) ====
| Representative | Party |
|---|---|
| Sonja Becq | CD&V |
| Hans Bonte | SP.A |
| Benoît Cerexhe | cdH |
| Bernard Clerfayt | FDF |
| Thiery Damien | FDF |
| Maggie De Block | Open VLD |
| François-Xavier de Donnea | MR |
| Filip De Man | VB |
| Corinne De Permentier | MR |
| Olivier Deleuze | Ecolo |
| Zoé Genot | Ecolo |
| Emir Kir | PS |
| Olivier Maingain | FDF |
| Yvan Mayeur | PS |
| Joëlle Milquet | cdH |
| Laurette Onkelinx (will be replaced) | PS |
| Charles Picqué | PS |
| Nadia Sminate | N-VA |
| Kristien Van Vaerenbergh | N-VA |
| Steven Vanackere | CD&V |
| Guy Vanhengel | Open VLD |
| Ben Weyts | N-VA |

=== Dutch-speaking ===
==== Antwerp (24) ====
| Representative | Party |
|---|---|
| Meyrem Almaci | Groen |
| Gerolf Annemans | VB |
| Kristof Calvo | Groen |
| Alexandra Colen | VB |
| Rita De Bont | VB |
| Minneke De Ridder | N-VA |
| Sophie De Wit | N-VA |
| Zuhal Demir | N-VA |
| Maya Detiège | SP.A |
| Caroline Gennez | SP.A |
| Jan Jambon | N-VA |
| Patrick Janssens | SP.A |
| Nahima Lanjri | CD&V |
| Willem-Frederik Schiltz | Open VLD |
| Bart Somers | Open VLD |
| Annemie Turtelboom | Open VLD |
| Bruno Valkeniers | VB |
| Jef Van den Bergh | CD&V |
| Jan Van Esbroeck | N-VA |
| Reinilde Van Moer | N-VA |
| Flor Van Noppen | N-VA |
| Servais Verherstraeten | CD&V |
| Inge Vervotte | CD&V |
| Bert Wollants replaces Kris Van Dijck | N-VA |

==== Leuven (7) ====
| Representative | Party |
|---|---|
| Eva Brems | Groen |
| Els Demol | N-VA |
| Carl Devlies | CD&V |
| Theo Francken | N-VA |
| Hagen Goyvaerts | VB |
| Gwendolyn Rutten | Open VLD |
| Bruno Tobback | SP.A |

==== Limburg (12) ====
| Representative | Party |
|---|---|
| Gerald Kindermans replaces Ivo Belet | CD&V |
| Patrick Dewael | Open VLD |
| Karolien Grosemans | N-VA |
| Meryame Kitir | SP.A |
| Peter Luykx replaces Frieda Brepoels | N-VA |
| Annick Ponthier | Vlaams Belang |
| Bert Schoofs | Vlaams Belang |
| Raf Terwingen | CD&V |
| Liesbeth Van der Auwera | CD&V |
| Steven Vandeput | N-VA |
| Peter Vanvelthoven | SP.A |
| Veerle Wouters replaces Jan Peumans | N-VA |

==== East Flanders (20) ====
| Representative | Party |
|---|---|
| Siegfried Bracke | N-VA |
| Mathias De Clercq | Open VLD |
| Pieter De Crem | CD&V |
| Herman De Croo | Open VLD |
| Guy D'haeseleer | Vlaams Belang |
| Peter Dedecker | N-VA |
| Ingeborg De Meulemeester | N-VA |
| Leen Dierick | CD&V |
| Barbara Pas | Vlaams Belang |
| Sarah Smeyers | N-VA |
| Ine Somers | Open VLD |
| Karin Temmerman | sp.a |
| Bruno Tuybens | sp.a |
| Karel Uyttersprot | N-VA |
| Dirk Van der Maelen | sp.a |
| Miranda Van Eetvelde | N-VA |
| Stefaan Van Hecke | Groen |
| Carina Van Tittelboom-Van Cauter | Open VLD |
| Stefaan Vercamer | CD&V |
| Tanguy Veys | Vlaams Belang |

==== West Flanders (16) ====
| Representative | Party |
|---|---|
| Manu Beuselinck | N-VA |
| Hendrik Bogaert | CD&V |
| Bert Maertens (replaces Geert Bourgeois) | N-VA |
| Stefaan De Clerck | CD&V |
| Wouter De Vriendt | Groen |
| Jean-Marie Dedecker | LDD |
| Koenraad Degroote | N-VA |
| Daphné Dumery | N-VA |
| Sabine Lahaye Battheu | Open VLD |
| Renaat Landuyt | SP.A |
| Bercy Slegers (replaces Yves Leterme) | CD&V |
| Peter Logghe | VB |
| Nathalie Muylle | CD&V |
| Vincent Van Quickenborne | Open VLD |
| Ann Vanheste | SP.A |
| Myriam Vanlerberghe | SP.A |

=== French-speaking ===
==== Hainaut (19) ====
| Representative | Party |
|---|---|
| Ronny Balcaen | Ecolo |
| Philippe Blanchaert | PS |
| Juliette Boulet | Ecolo |
| Christian Brotcorne | cdH |
| Colette Burgeon | PS |
| Olivier Chastel | MR |
| Rudy Demotte | PS |
| Laurent Devin | PS |
| Elio Di Rupo | PS |
| Denis Ducarme | MR |
| Antony Dufrane | PS |
| Catherine Fonck | cdH |
| Jacqueline Galant | MR |
| Marie-Christine Marghem | MR |
| Patrick Moriau | PS |
| Ozlem Ozen | PS |
| Franco Seminara | PS |
| Eric Thiebaut | PS |
| Christiane Vienne | PS |

==== Liège (15) ====
| Representative | Party |
|---|---|
| Daniel Bacquelaine | MR |
| Guy Coëme | PS |
| Michel Daerden | PS |
| Julie Fernandez-Fernandez | PS |
| André Frederic | PS |
| Muriel Gerkens | Ecolo |
| Philippe Goffin | MR |
| Kattrin Jadin | MR |
| Eric Jadot | Ecolo |
| Marie-Claire Lambert | PS |
| Mauro Lenzini | PS |
| Alain Mathot | PS |
| Didier Reynders | MR |
| Marie-Dominique Simonet | cdH |
| Melchior Wathelet, Jr. | cdH |

==== Luxembourg (4) ====
| Representative | Party |
|---|---|
| Philippe Collard | MR |
| Philippe Courard | PS |
| Benoît Lutgen | cdH |
| Isabelle Poncelet | cdH |

==== Namur (6) ====
| Representative | Party |
|---|---|
| David Clarinval | MR |
| Jean-Marc Delizée | PS |
| Valérie Déom | PS |
| Georges Gilkinet | Ecolo |
| Sabine Laruelle | MR |
| Maxime Prévot | cdH |

==== Walloon Brabant (5) ====
| Representative | Party |
|---|---|
| Valérie de Bue | MR |
| André Flahaut | PS |
| Laurent Louis | PP |
| Charles Michel | MR |
| Thérèse Snoy | Ecolo |

== By party ==
=== Dutch-speaking ===
==== New Flemish Alliance (27) ====
| Representative | Electoral district |
|---|---|
| Manu Beuselinck | West Flanders |
| Siegfried Bracke | East Flanders |
| Ingeborg De Meulemeester | East Flanders |
| Minneke De Ridder | Antwerp |
| Sophie De Wit | Antwerp |
| Peter Dedecker | East Flanders |
| Koenraad Degroote | West Flanders |
| Zuhal Demir | Antwerp |
| Els Demol | Leuven |
| Daphné Dumery | West Flanders |
| Theo Francken | Leuven |
| Karolien Grosemans | Limburg |
| Jan Jambon | Antwerp |
| Peter Luykx | Limburg |
| Bert Maertens | West Flanders |
| Sarah Smeyers | East Flanders |
| Nadia Sminate | Brussels-Halle-Vilvoorde |
| Karel Uyttersprot | East Flanders |
| Miranda Van Eetvelde | East Flanders |
| Jan Van Esbroeck | Antwerp |
| Reinilde Van Moer | Antwerp |
| Flor Van Noppen | Antwerp |
| Kristien Van Vaerenbergh | Brussels-Halle-Vilvoorde |
| Steven Vandeput | Limburg |
| Ben Weyts | Brussels-Halle-Vilvoorde |
| Bert Wollants | Antwerp |
| Veerle Wouters | Limburg |

==== Christian Democratic and Flemish (17) ====
| Representative | Electoral district |
|---|---|
| Sonja Becq | Brussels-Halle-Vilvoorde |
| Hendrik Bogaert | West Flanders |
| Stefaan De Clerck | West Flanders |
| Pieter De Crem | East Flanders |
| Carl Devlies | Leuven |
| Leen Dierick | East Flanders |
| Gerald Kindermans | Limburg |
| Nahima Lanjri | Antwerp |
| Yves Leterme | West Flanders |
| Nathalie Muylle | West Flanders |
| Raf Terwingen | Limburg |
| Jef Van den Bergh | Antwerp |
| Liesbeth Van der Auwera | Limburg |
| Steven Vanackere | Brussels-Halle-Vilvoorde |
| Stefaan Vercamer | East Flanders |
| Servais Verherstraeten | Antwerp |
| Inge Vervotte | Antwerp |

==== Socialist Party – Differently (13) ====
| Representative | Electoral district |
|---|---|
| Hans Bonte | Brussels-Halle-Vilvoorde |
| Maya Detiège | Antwerp |
| Caroline Gennez | Antwerp |
| Patrick Janssens | Antwerp |
| Meryame Kitir | Limburg |
| Renaat Landuyt | West Flanders |
| Karin Temmerman | East Flanders |
| Bruno Tobback | Leuven |
| Bruno Tuybens | East Flanders |
| Dirk Van der Maelen | East Flanders |
| Ann Vanheste | West Flanders |
| Myriam Vanlerberghe | West Flanders |
| Peter Vanvelthoven | Limburg |

==== Open Flemish Liberals and Democrats (13) ====
| Representative | Electoral district |
|---|---|
| Maggie De Block | Brussels-Halle-Vilvoorde |
| Mathias De Clercq | East Flanders |
| Herman De Croo | East Flanders |
| Patrick Dewael | Limburg |
| Sabine Lahaye Battheu | West Flanders |
| Gwendolyn Rutten | Leuven |
| Willem-Frederik Schiltz | Antwerp |
| Bart Somers | Antwerp |
| Ine Somers | East Flanders |
| Annemie Turtelboom | Antwerp |
| Vincent Van Quickenborne | West Flanders |
| Carina Van Tittelboom-Van Cauter | East Flanders |
| Guy Vanhengel | Brussels-Halle-Vilvoorde |

==== Vlaams Belang (12) ====
| Representative | Electoral district |
|---|---|
| Gerolf Annemans | Antwerp |
| Alexandra Colen | Antwerp |
| Rita De Bont | Antwerp |
| Filip De Man | Brussels-Halle-Vilvoorde |
| Guy D'haeseleer | East Flanders |
| Hagen Goyvaerts | Leuven |
| Peter Logghe | West Flanders |
| Barbara Pas | East Flanders |
| Annick Ponthier | Limburg |
| Bert Schoofs | Limburg |
| Bruno Valkeniers | Antwerp |
| Tanguy Veys | East Flanders |

==== Groen (5) ====
| Representative | Electoral district |
|---|---|
| Meyrem Almaci | Antwerp |
| Eva Brems | Leuven |
| Kristof Calvo | Antwerp |
| Wouter De Vriendt | West Flanders |
| Stefaan Van Hecke | East Flanders |

==== LDD (1) ====
| Representative | Electoral district |
|---|---|
| Jean-Marie Dedecker | West Flanders |

=== French-speaking ===
==== Parti Socialiste (26) ====
| Representative | Electoral district |
|---|---|
| Philippe Blanchaert | Hainaut |
| Colette Burgeon | Hainaut |
| Guy Coëme | Liège |
| Philippe Courard | Luxembourg |
| Michel Daerden | Liège |
| Jean-Marc Delizée | Namur |
| Rudy Demotte | Hainaut |
| Valérie Déom | Namur |
| Laurent Devin | Hainaut |
| Elio Di Rupo | Hainaut |
| Antony Dufrane | Hainaut |
| Julie Fernandez-Fernandez | Liège |
| André Flahaut | Walloon Brabant |
| André Frédéric | Liège |
| Emir Kir | Brussels-Halle-Vilvoorde |
| Marie-Claire Lambert | Liège |
| Mauro Lenzini | Liège |
| Alain Mathot | Liège |
| Yvan Mayeur | Brussels-Halle-Vilvoorde |
| Patrick Moriau | Hainaut |
| Laurette Onkelinx | Brussels-Halle-Vilvoorde |
| Ozlem Ozen | Hainaut |
| Charles Picqué | Brussels-Halle-Vilvoorde |
| Franco Seminara | Hainaut |
| Eric Thiebaut | Hainaut |
| Christiane Vienne | Hainaut |

==== Mouvement Réformateur (18) ====
| Representative | Electoral district |
|---|---|
| Daniel Bacquelaine | Liège |
| Olivier Chastel | Hainaut |
| David Clarinval | Namur |
| Bernard Clerfayt | Brussels-Halle-Vilvoorde |
| Philippe Collard | Luxembourg |
| Thiery Damien | Brussels-Halle-Vilvoorde |
| Valérie de Bue | Walloon Brabant |
| François-Xavier de Donnea | Brussels-Halle-Vilvoorde |
| Corinne De Permentier | Brussels-Halle-Vilvoorde |
| Denis Ducarme | Hainaut |
| Jacqueline Galant | Hainaut |
| Philippe Goffin | Liège |
| Kattrin Jadin | Liège |
| Sabine Laruelle | Namur |
| Olivier Maingain | Brussels-Halle-Vilvoorde |
| Marie-Christine Marghem | Hainaut |
| Charles Michel | Walloon Brabant |
| Didier Reynders | Liège |

==== cdH (9) ====
| Representative | Electoral district |
|---|---|
| Christian Brotcorne | Hainaut |
| Benoît Cerexhe | Brussels-Halle-Vilvoorde |
| Catherine Fonck | Hainaut |
| Benoît Lutgen | Luxembourg |
| Joëlle Milquet | Brussels-Halle-Vilvoorde |
| Isabelle Poncelet | Luxembourg |
| Maxime Prévot | Namur |
| Marie-Dominique Simonet | Liège |
| Melchior Wathelet, Jr. | Liège |

==== Ecolo (8) ====
| Representative | Electoral district |
|---|---|
| Ronny Balcaen | Hainaut |
| Juliette Boulet | Hainaut |
| Olivier Deleuze | Brussels-Halle-Vilvoorde |
| Zoé Genot | Brussels-Halle-Vilvoorde |
| Muriel Gerkens | Liège |
| George Gilkinet | Namur |
| Eric Jadot | Liège |
| Thérèse Snoy et d'Oppuers | Walloon Brabant |

==== Parti Populaire (1) ====
| Representative | Electoral district |
|---|---|
| Laurent Louis | Walloon Brabant |

== List of representatives who chose not to sit ==
| Name | Party | Date of resignation | Replacement | Notes |
|---|---|---|---|---|
| Ivo Belet | CD&V | 6 July 2010 | Gerald Kindermans | Stays member of the European Parliament |
| Frieda Brepoels | N-VA | 6 July 2010 | Peter Luykx | Stays member of the European Parliament |
| Benoît Cerexhe | CDH | 6 July 2010 | Myriam Delacroix-Rolin | Stays Brussels minister |
| Patrick Janssens | SP.A | 6 July 2010 | David Geerts | Stays member of the Flemish Parliament |
| Ingrid Lieten | SP.A | 6 July 2010 | Meryame Kitir | Stays Flemish minister |
| Benoît Lutgen | CDH | 6 July 2010 | Annick Van Den Ende-Chapellier | Stays Walloon minister |
| Jan Peumans | N-VA | 6 July 2010 | Veerle Wouters | Stays member of the Flemish Parliament |
| Isabelle Poncelet | CDH | 6 July 2010 | Josy Arens | Stays provincial deputy in Luxembourg |
| Maxime Prévot | CDH | 6 July 2010 | Christophe Bastin | Stays member of the Walloon Parliament |
| Marie-Dominique Simonet | CDH | 6 July 2010 | Joseph George | Stays French Community minister |
| Kris Van Dijck | N-VA | 6 July 2010 | Bert Wollants | Stays member of the Flemish Parliament |
| Geert Bourgeois | N-VA | 7 July 2010 | Bert Maertens | Stays member of the Flemish Parliament |

== List of representatives who resigned ==
| Name | Party | Date of resignation | Replacement | Notes |
|---|---|---|---|---|
| Hendrik Bogaert | CD&V | 7 December 2011 | Roel Deseyn | Became state secretary in Di Rupo I |
| Olivier Chastel | MR | 7 December 2011 | Olivier Destrebecq | Became minister in Di Rupo I |
| Philippe Courard | PS | 7 December 2011 | André Perpète | Became state secretary in Di Rupo I |
| Maggie De Block | Open VLD | 7 December 2011 | Luk Van Biesen | Became state secretary in Di Rupo I |
| Pieter De Crem | CD&V | 7 December 2011 | Jenne De Potter | Became minister in Di Rupo I |
| Elio Di Rupo | PS | 7 December 2011 | Bruno Van Grootenbrulle | Became prime minister in Di Rupo I |
| Sabine Laruelle | MR | 7 December 2011 | Valérie Warzée-Caverenne | Became minister in Di Rupo I |
| Joëlle Milquet | CDH | 7 December 2011 | Georges Dallemagne | Became minister in Di Rupo I |
| Laurette Onkelinx | PS | 7 December 2011 | Isabelle Emmery | Became minister in Di Rupo I |
| Didier Reynders | MR | 7 December 2011 | Luc Gustin | Became minister in Di Rupo I |
| Annemie Turtelboom | Open VLD | 7 December 2011 | Frank Wilrycx | Became minister in Di Rupo I |
| Steven Vanackere | CD&V | 7 December 2011 | Michel Doomst | Became minister in Di Rupo I |
| Vincent Van Quickenborne | Open VLD | 7 December 2011 | Roland Defreyne | Became minister in Di Rupo I |
| Servais Verherstraeten | CD&V | 7 December 2011 | Kristof Waterschoot | Became state secretary in Di Rupo I |
| Melchior Wathelet | CDH | 7 December 2011 | Marie-Martine Schyns | Became state secretary in Di Rupo I |
| Guy Vanhengel | Open VLD | 16 December 2011 | Lieve Wierinck | Became Brussels minister in Picqué IV |
| Yves Leterme | CD&V | 31 December 2011 | Bercy Slegers | Became deputy secretary-general of OECD |
| Olivier Deleuze | Ecolo | 28 March 2012 | Lahssaini Fouad | Became president of "Ecolo" |
| Inge Vervotte | CD&V | 2 January 2013 | Nik Van Gool | Will become chairwoman of "Emmaüs" |

== Sources ==
- "De kamerleden" (in Dutch). The Belgian Chamber of Representatives. Archived from the original on 2012-03-06.
- "Les députés" (in French). The Belgian Chamber of Representatives. Archived from the original on 2008-11-11.
- "Bureau van de Kamer - College van Quaestoren" (PDF) (in Dutch). The Belgian Chamber of Representatives. 2008-01-17. Archived from the original (PDF) on 2011-06-06.
- "Bureau de la Chambre - College dès Questeurs" (PDF) (in French). The Belgian Chamber of Representatives. 2008-01-17. Archived from the original (PDF) on 2011-06-06.
