= List of members of the Chamber of Representatives of Belgium, 2014–2019 =

This is a list of members of the Belgian Chamber of Representatives during the 54th legislature (2014–2019), arranged alphabetically.

The government majority during this legislature is formed by a coalition of N-VA, CD&V, Open Vld and MR, forming the Michel Government.

== Election results (25 May 2014) ==
Party	Votes	%	+/–	Seats	+/–
New Flemish Alliance	1,366,397	20.26	+2.86	33	+6
Parti Socialiste	787,058	11.67	–2.03	23	–3
Christen-Democratisch en Vlaams	783,040	11.61	+0.76	18	+1
Open Vlaamse Liberalen en Democraten	659,571	9.78	+1.14	14	+1
Mouvement Réformateur	650,260	9.64	+0.36	20	+2
Socialistische Partij Anders	595,466	8.83	–0.41	13	0
Groen	358,947	5.32	+0.94	6	+1
Centre démocrate humaniste	336,184	4.98	–0.54	9	0
Vlaams Belang	247,738	3.67	–4.09	3	–9
Ecolo	222,524	3.30	–1.50	6	–2
Parti du Travail de Belgique-GO !	132,943	1.97	New	2	New
Francophone Democratic Federalists	121,384	1.80	New	2	New
Partij van de Arbeid+	118,333	1.75	+0.94	0	0
People's Party	102,581	1.52	+0.23	1	0
Debout Les Belges!	58,043	0.86	New	0	New
Libertair, Direct, Democratisch	28,414	0.42	–1.89	0	–1
La Droite	26,035	0.39	New	0	New
Pirate Party	23,169	0.34	New	0	New
Faire place Nette	15,467	0.23	New	0	New
ISLAM	13,719	0.20	New	0	New
Belgian Union	12,103	0.18	–0.14	0	0
ROSSEM	11,680	0.17	New	0	New
Wallonie d'Abord	11,221	0.17	–0.39	0	0
Nation	10,216	0.15	New	0	New
Pirate	9,845	0.15	New	0	New
Rassemblement Wallonie France	7,394	0.11	–0.44	0	0
Mouvement de Gauche	4,529	0.07	New	0	New
Lutte Ouvrière	3,539	0.05	New	0	New
PP Partipensionnes	3,178	0.05	–0.06	0	0
Front Wallon	3,080	0.05	New	0	New
New Alternative Wallonia	2,785	0.04	New	0	New
Sociaal Democraten & Progressieven	2,298	0.03	New	0	New
PP	2,281	0.03	New	0	New
P+	2,254	0.03	New	0	New
Valeurs Libérales Citoyennes	2,028	0.03	New	0	New
Walloon Rally	1,598	0.02	New	0	New
Gauches Communes	1,445	0.02	New	0	New
Vox Populi Belgica	1,280	0.02	New	0	New
Égalitaires !	953	0.01	New	0	New
Partij Voor Gehandicapten en Welzijn	932	0.01	New	0	New
Parti Libertarien	750	0.01	New	0	New
MGJOD	460	0.01	New	0	New
CIM	430	0.01	New	0	New
MOVE	400	0.01	New	0	New
Agora Erasmus	382	0.01	New	0	New
LaLutte-DeStrijd	213	0.00	New	0	New
Total	6,744,547	100.00	–	150	0
Valid votes	6,744,547	94.23			
Invalid/blank votes	412,951	5.77			
Total votes	7,157,498	100.00			
Registered voters/turnout	8,008,776	89.37			
Source: IBZ

Seats by electoral district and by party
Party / Electoral district	N-VA	CD&V	Open Vld	sp.a	Groen	Vlaams Belang	PVDA+ / PTB-GO!	PS	MR	cdH	Ecolo	FDF	Parti Populaire	Total
Antwerp	11	4	2	3	2	2	0	—						24
East Flanders	5	4	4	3	2	1	0	—						20
West Flanders	6	4	2	3	1	0	0	—						16
Limburg	5	3	2	2	0	0	0	—						12
Flemish Brabant	5	3	4	2	1	0	0	—						15
Brussels	0	0	0	0	—	0	0	5	4	2	2	2	0	15
Hainaut	—						1	9	5	2	1	0	0	18
Liège	—						1	5	5	2	1	0	1	15
Namur	—						0	2	2	1	1	0	0	6
Walloon Brabant	—						0	1	3	0	1	0	0	5
Luxembourg	—						0	1	1	2	0	0	0	4
Total	33	18	14	13	6	3	2	23	20	9	6	2	1	150

== Bureau ==
=== Presidents ===
Office	Senator	Party
President	Siegfried Bracke	N-VA
1st Vicepresident	André Flahaut	PS
2nd Vicepresident	Françoise Schepmans	MR
3rd Vicepresident	Sonja Becq	CD&V

=== College of Quaestors ===
Office	Senator	Party
1st Quaestor	Sarah Smeyers	N-VA
2nd Quaestor	Colette Burgeon	PS
3rd Quaestor	Olivier Maingain	FDF
4th Quaestor	Gerald Kindermans	CD&V

=== Group leaders ===
Office	Senator	Party
N-VA Floor leader	Peter De Roover (since January 2016)	N-VA
PS Floor leader	Laurette Onkelinx	PS

== List of representatives ==
Representative	Group	Electoral district	Language group	Comments
Meyrem Almaci	Ecolo/Groen	Antwerp	Dutch	
Rita Bellens	N-VA	Antwerp	Dutch	
Kristof Calvo	Ecolo/Groen	Antwerp	Dutch	
Monica De Coninck	sp.a	Antwerp	Dutch	
Zuhal Demir	N-VA	Antwerp	Dutch	
Peter De Roover	N-VA	Antwerp	Dutch	
Maya Detiège	sp.a	Antwerp	Dutch	
Bart De Wever	N-VA	Antwerp	Dutch	
Filip Dewinter	Vlaams Belang	Antwerp	Dutch	
Sophie De Wit	N-VA	Antwerp	Dutch	
David Geerts	sp.a	Antwerp	Dutch	
Johan Klaps	N-VA	Antwerp	Dutch	since 11 October 2014, replacing Jan Jambon, who became Minister in the Michel Government
Nahima Lanjri	CD&V	Antwerp	Dutch	
Koen Metsu	N-VA	Antwerp	Dutch	
Jan Penris	Vlaams Belang	Antwerp	Dutch	since 19 June 2014, replacing Marijke Dillen
Griet Smaers	CD&V	Antwerp	Dutch	
Annemie Turtelboom	Open Vld	Antwerp	Dutch	was replaced by Frank Wilrycx from 25 July 2014 until 29 April 2016, when she was Minister in the Bourgeois Government
Yoleen Van Camp	N-VA	Antwerp	Dutch	
Rob Van de Velde	N-VA	Antwerp	Dutch	
Jef Van den Bergh	CD&V	Antwerp	Dutch	
Dirk Van Mechelen	Open Vld	Antwerp	Dutch	
Valerie Van Peel	N-VA	Antwerp	Dutch	
Servais Verherstraeten	CD&V	Antwerp	Dutch	
Bert Wollants	N-VA	Antwerp	Dutch	
Siegfried Bracke	N-VA	East Flanders	Dutch	President
Peter Buysrogge	N-VA	East Flanders	Dutch	
Sarah Claerhout	CD&V	East Flanders	Dutch	since 11 October 2014, replacing Pieter De Crem, who became Secretary of State in the Michel Government
Peter Dedecker	N-VA	East Flanders	Dutch	
Christoph D'Haese	N-VA	East Flanders	Dutch	
Leen Dierick	CD&V	East Flanders	Dutch	
Katja Gabriëls	Open Vld	East Flanders	Dutch	since 11 October 2014, replacing Alexander De Croo, who became Minister in the Michel Government
Egbert Lachaert	Open Vld	East Flanders	Dutch	
Barbara Pas	Vlaams Belang	East Flanders	Dutch	
Fatma Pehlivan	sp.a	East Flanders	Dutch	
Sarah Smeyers	N-VA	East Flanders	Dutch	
Ine Somers	Open Vld	East Flanders	Dutch	
Karin Temmerman	sp.a	East Flanders	Dutch	
Goedele Uyttersprot	N-VA	East Flanders	Dutch	
Carina Van Cauter	Open Vld	East Flanders	Dutch	
Dirk Van der Maelen	sp.a	East Flanders	Dutch	
Stefaan Van Hecke	Ecolo/Groen	East Flanders	Dutch	
Stefaan Vercamer	CD&V	East Flanders	Dutch	
Evita Willaert	Ecolo/Groen	East Flanders	Dutch	
Veli Yüksel	CD&V	East Flanders	Dutch	
Philippe Blanchart	PS	Hainaut	French	
Christian Brotcorne	cdH	Hainaut	French	
Olivier Chastel	MR	Hainaut	French	
Paul-Olivier Delannois	PS	Hainaut	French	
Laurent Devin	PS	Hainaut	French	
Elio Di Rupo	PS	Hainaut	French	
Denis Ducarme	MR	Hainaut	French	
Jean-Jacques Flahaux	MR	Hainaut	French	
Catherine Fonck	cdH	Hainaut	French	
Benoît Friart	MR	Hainaut	French	
Eric Massin	PS	Hainaut	French	
Richard Miller	MR	Hainaut	French	since 11 October 2014, replacing Marie-Christine Marghem, who became Minister in the Michel Government
Jean-Marc Nollet	Ecolo/Groen	Hainaut	French	
Özlem Özen	PS	Hainaut	French	
Daniel Senesael	PS	Hainaut	French	
Eric Thiébaut	PS	Hainaut	French	
Marco Van Hees	PTB-go!	Hainaut	French	
Fabienne Winckel	PS	Hainaut	French	
Hendrik Bogaert	CD&V	West Flanders	Dutch	
An Capoen	N-VA	West Flanders	Dutch	
Koenraad Degroote	N-VA	West Flanders	Dutch	
Franky Demon	CD&V	West Flanders	Dutch	
Roel Deseyn	CD&V	West Flanders	Dutch	
Wouter De Vriendt	Ecolo/Groen	West Flanders	Dutch	
Daphné Dumery	N-VA	West Flanders	Dutch	
Rita Gantois	N-VA	West Flanders	Dutch	
Sabien Lahaye-Battheu	Open Vld	West Flanders	Dutch	
Nathalie Muylle	CD&V	West Flanders	Dutch	
Alain Top	sp.a	West Flanders	Dutch	
Johan Vande Lanotte	sp.a	West Flanders	Dutch	
Ann Vanheste	sp.a	West Flanders	Dutch	
Vincent Van Quickenborne	Open Vld	West Flanders	Dutch	
Jan Vercammen	N-VA	West Flanders	Dutch	
Brecht Vermeulen	N-VA	West Flanders	Dutch	
Nawal Ben Hamou	PS	Brussels	French	
Véronique Caprasse	FDF	Brussels	French	
Georges Dallemagne	cdH	Brussels	French	since 22 July 2014, replacing Céline Fremault, who became Minister in the Brussels Vervoort II Government
Francis Delpérée	cdH	Brussels	French	
Benoit Hellings	Ecolo/Groen	Brussels	French	
Emir Kir	PS	Brussels	French	
Gilles Vanden Burre	Ecolo/Groen	Brussels	French	since 28 May 2015, replacing Zakia Khattabi, who became party co-leader of Ecolo
Ahmed Laaouej	PS	Brussels	French	
Karine Lalieux	PS	Brussels	French	
Olivier Maingain	FDF	Brussels	French	
Laurette Onkelinx	PS	Brussels	French	
Philippe Pivin	MR	Brussels	French	
Françoise Schepmans	MR	Brussels	French	
Damien Thiéry	MR	Brussels	French	
Gautier Calomne	MR	Brussels	French	since 22 September 2015, replacing Sophie Wilmès, who became Minister in the Michel Government. Wilmès had since 11 October 2014 replaced Didier Reynders, who became Minister in the Michel Government
Aldo Carcaci	Parti Populaire	Liège	French	
Caroline Cassart-Mailleux	MR	Liège	French	
Frédéric Daerden	PS	Liège	French	
Willy Demeyer	PS	Liège	French	
Julie Fernandez-Fernandez	PS	Liège	French	
Gilles Foret	MR	Liège	French	
André Frédéric	PS	Liège	French	
Muriel Gerkens	Ecolo/Groen	Liège	French	
Philippe Goffin	MR	Liège	French	
Luc Gustin	MR	Liège	French	since 11 October 2014, replacing Daniel Bacquelaine, who became Minister in the Michel Government
Raoul Hedebouw	PTB-go!	Liège	French	
Kattrin Jadin	MR	Liège	French	Jadin is leader of PFF, the German-speaking chapter of MR, but there is no German language group in the Chamber (all Walloon representatives are automatically part of the French language group)
Alain Mathot	PS	Liège	French	
Michel de Lamotte	cdH	Liège	French	since 19 April 2015, replacing Melchior Wathelet, who left national politics
Vanessa Matz	cdH	Liège	French	
Sonja Becq	CD&V	Flemish Brabant	Dutch	
Hans Bonte	sp.a	Flemish Brabant	Dutch	
Patricia Ceysens	Open Vld	Flemish Brabant	Dutch	
Inez De Coninck	N-VA	Flemish Brabant	Dutch	
Anne Dedry	Ecolo/Groen	Flemish Brabant	Dutch	
Renate Hufkens	N-VA	Flemish Brabant	Dutch	since 11 October 2014, replacing Theo Francken, who became Secretary of State in the Michel Government
Dirk Janssens	Open Vld	Flemish Brabant	Dutch	since 11 October 2014, replacing Maggie De Block, who became Minister in the Michel Government
Karine Jiroflée	sp.a	Flemish Brabant	Dutch	
Jan Spooren	N-VA	Flemish Brabant	Dutch	
Luk Van Biesen	Open Vld	Flemish Brabant	Dutch	
Tim Vandenput	Open Vld	Flemish Brabant	Dutch	
Els Van Hoof	CD&V	Flemish Brabant	Dutch	since 11 October 2014, replacing Koen Geens, who became Minister in the Michel Government
Eric Van Rompuy	CD&V	Flemish Brabant	Dutch	
Kristien Van Vaerenbergh	N-VA	Flemish Brabant	Dutch	
Hendrik Vuye	N-VA	Flemish Brabant	Dutch	quit the party on 21 September 2016, remained independent member of parliament
Wouter Beke	CD&V	Limburg	Dutch	
Patrick Dewael	Open Vld	Limburg	Dutch	
Karolien Grosemans	N-VA	Limburg	Dutch	
Veerle Heeren	CD&V	Limburg	Dutch	
Werner Janssen	N-VA	Limburg	Dutch	
Meryame Kitir	sp.a	Limburg	Dutch	
Nele Lijnen	Open Vld	Limburg	Dutch	
Peter Luykx	N-VA	Limburg	Dutch	
Wouter Raskin	N-VA	Limburg	Dutch	since 11 October 2014, replacing Steven Vandeput, who became Minister in the Michel Government
Raf Terwingen	CD&V	Limburg	Dutch	
Peter Vanvelthoven	sp.a	Limburg	Dutch	
Veerle Wouters	N-VA	Limburg	Dutch	quit the party on 21 September 2016, remained independent member of parliament
David Clarinval	MR	Namur	French	
Jean-Marc Delizée	PS	Namur	French	
Benoît Dispa	cdH	Namur	French	
Georges Gilkinet	Ecolo/Groen	Namur	French	
Gwenaëlle Grovonius	PS	Namur	French	
Stéphanie Thoron	MR	Namur	French	
Emmanuel Burton	MR	Walloon Brabant	French	
Marcel Cheron	Ecolo/Groen	Walloon Brabant	French	
Sybille de Coster-Bauchau	MR	Walloon Brabant	French	
Stéphane Crusnière	PS	Walloon Brabant	French	since 22 July 2014, replacing André Flahaut, who became Minister in the Demotte III Government of the French Community
Vincent Scourneau	MR	Walloon Brabant	French	since 11 October 2014, replacing Charles Michel, who became Prime Minister in the Michel Government
Benoît Lutgen	cdH	Luxembourg	French	
Benoît Piedboeuf	MR	Luxembourg	French	
Sébastian Pirlot	PS	Luxembourg	French	
Isabelle Poncelet	cdH	Luxembourg	French	

== Sources ==
- "De kamerleden" (in Dutch). The Belgian Chamber of Representatives. Archived from the original on 2012-03-06.
- "Les députés" (in French). The Belgian Chamber of Representatives. Archived from the original on 2008-11-11.
- "Bureau van de Kamer - College van Quaestoren" (PDF) (in Dutch). The Belgian Chamber of Representatives. 2008-01-17. Archived from the original (PDF) on 2011-06-06.
- "Bureau de la Chambre - College dès Questeurs" (PDF) (in French). The Belgian Chamber of Representatives. 2008-01-17. Archived from the original (PDF) on 2011-06-06.
