= Brussels-Halle-Vilvoorde (Chamber of Representatives constituency) =

Belgian political subdivision

Brussels-Halle-Vilvoorde was a constituency used to elect members of the Belgian Chamber of Representatives between 1995 and 2014. Negotiations held between Belgian political parties in 2011 resulted in the subdivision of the constituency into different parts.

== Representatives ==
Name	Party	From	To
Alain Courtois	MR	2003	2007
André du Bus de Warnaffe	cdH	1995	1999
Annemie Van de Casteele	VU	1995	2003
Bart Laeremans	VB	1995	2010
Ben Weyts	N-VA	2007	2014
Bernard Clerfayt	DéFI	2010	2014
Clotilde Nyssens	cdH	2007	2010
Corinne De Permentier	PRL	1999	2014
Damien Thiéry	DéFI	2010	2014
Daniel Ducarme	MR	2003	2010
Dirk Pieters	CVP	1995	2003
Eric Libert	MR	2003	2010
Eric van Weddingen	PRL	1999	2003
Filip De Man	VB	1995	2014
Fouad Lahssaini	Ecolo	2007	2014
François-Xavier de Donnea	PRL	1995	2014
Georges Clerfayt	DéFI	1995	2003
Georges Dallemagne	cdH	2007	2014
Hans Bonte	PS	1995	2014
Herman Van Rompuy	CVP	1999	2007
Isabelle Emmery	PS	2010	2014
Jacques Simonet	PRL	1995	2003
Jacques Vandenhaute	PRL	1995	1999
Jan Van Erps	CVP	1995	1999
Jean Cornil	PS	2007	2010
Jeanne Nyanga-Lumbala	cdH	2010	2014
Jef Valkeniers	VLD	1995	2003
Joëlle Milquet	cdH	1999	2007
Karine Lalieux	PS	1999	2014
Kristien Van Vaerenbergh	N-VA	2010	2014
Lieve Wierinck	VLD	2010	2014
Lode Vanoost	Agalev	1995	2003
Luk Van Biesen	VLD	2003	2014
Maggie De Block	VLD	1999	2010
Marguerite Bastien	FN	1995	1999
Marie Nagy	Ecolo	2003	2007
Marie-Thérèse Coenen	Ecolo	1999	2003
Michel Doomst	CD&V	2007	2010
Michel Moock	PS	1995	1999
Mohammed Boukourna	PS	2003	2007
Mohammed Jabour	PS	2010	2014
Mylène Nys	Ecolo	1995	1999
Nadia Sminate	N-VA	2010	2014
Olivier Deleuze	Ecolo	1995	1999
Olivier Maingain	DéFI	1995	2014
Robert Delathouwer	PS	1995	1999
Serge Moureaux	PS	1995	1999
Simonne Creyf	CVP	1995	2007
Sonja Becq	CD&V	2007	2014
Steven Vanackere	CD&V	2010	2014
Talbia Belhouari	PS	2003	2007
Tinne Van der Straeten	Groen	2007	2010
Vincent Decroly	Ecolo	1999	2003
Walter Muls	Spirit	2003	2007
Willy Cortois	VLD	1995	2007
Xavier Baeselen	MR	2007	2010
Yvan Mayeur	PS	1999	2014
Zoé Genot	Ecolo	1999	2014
