= List of Belgian mayors =

This is a list of current city mayors in Belgium.

== List ==
Municipality	C	Mayor	Party	Office entered
(East Flanders) Aalst		Christoph D'Haese	N-VA	2013
(Flemish Brabant) Aarschot		André Peeters	CD&V	2007
(Antwerp Province) Antwerp		Bart De Wever	N-VA	2013
(Limburg (Belgium)) Beringen		Marcel Mondelaers	CD&V	
(West Flanders) Bruges		Dirk De fauw	CD&V	2019
Brussels		Philippe Close	PS	2017
(Hainaut Province) Charleroi		Paul Magnette	PS	2013
(West Flanders) Damme		Dirk Bisschop	CD&V	
(East Flanders) Dendermonde		Piet Buyse	CD&V	
(East Flanders) Deinze		Jan Vermeulen	CD&V	
(Flemish Brabant) Diest		Jan Laurys	DSS	
(West Flanders) Diksmuide		Lies Laridon	CD&V	
(Limburg (Belgium)) Dilsen-Stokkem		Lydia Peeters	Open VLD	
(East Flanders) Eeklo		Luc Vandevelde	SMS	2019
(Antwerp Province) Geel		Vera Celis	N-VA	2020
(Limburg (Belgium)) Genk		Wim Dries	CD&V	2009
(East Flanders) Geraardsbergen		Freddy De Chou	SP.A	2007
(East Flanders) Ghent		Mathias De Clercq	Open Vld	2018
(West Flanders) Gistel		Bart Halewyck	CD&V	
(Flemish Brabant) Halle		Dirk Pieters	CD&V	
(Limburg (Belgium)) Hasselt		Steven Vandeput	N-VA	2018
(Antwerp Province) Herentals		Jan Peeters	SP.A	2001
(Antwerp Province) Hoogstraten		Marc Van Aperen	Hoogstraten Leeft	2019
(West Flanders) Ypres		Yves Leterme	CD&V	2013
(West Flanders) Izegem		Bert Maertens	N-VA	2013
(West Flanders) Kortrijk		Vincent Van Quickenborne	Open VLD	2013
(Flemish Brabant) Leuven		Louis Tobback	SP.A	1995
(Liège Province) Liège		Willy Demeyer	PS	1999
(Antwerp Province) Lier		Marleen Vanderpoorten	Open VLD	2004
(East Flanders) Lokeren		Filip Anthuenis	Open VLD	2001
(Limburg (Belgium)) Lommel		Peter Vanvelthoven	SP.A	2007
(West Flanders) Lo-Reninge		Lode Morlion	CD&V	
(Antwerp Province) Mechelen		Bart Somers	Open VLD	2001
(West Flanders) Menen		Martine Fournier	CD&V	2013
(West Flanders) Mesen		Sandy Evrard	MLM	
(Hainaut Province) Mons		Elio Di Rupo	PS	2001
(Antwerp Province) Mortsel		Erik Broeckx	N-VA	2013
(Namur Province) Namur		Maxime Prévot	CDH	2012
(West Flanders) Nieuwpoort		Roland Crabbe	CD&V	
(East Flanders) Ninove		Michel Casteur	Open VLD	
(West Flanders) Ostend		Bart Tommelein	Open VLD	2019
(East Flanders) Oudenaarde		Marnic De Meulemeester	Open VLD	2000
(Limburg (Belgium)) Peer		Steven Matheï	CD&V	2013
(West Flanders) Poperinge		Christof Dejaegher	CD&V	
(West Flanders) Roeselare		Luc Martens	CD&V	2005
(East Flanders) Sint-Niklaas		Lieven Dehandschutter	N-VA	2013
(Limburg (Belgium)) Sint-Truiden		Ludwig Vandenhove	SP.A	1995
(Limburg (Belgium)) Tongeren		Patrick Dewael	Open VLD	1995
(West Flanders) Torhout		Hilde Crevits	CD&V	2016
(Antwerp Province) Turnhout		Francis Stijnen	CD&V	2008
(Flemish Brabant) Vilvoorde		Hans Bonte	SP.A	2013
(Luxembourg (Belgium)) Virton		Michel Thiry	CDH	
(West Flanders) Waregem		Kurt Vanryckeghem	CD&V	2007
(Walloon Brabant) Wavre		Françoise Pigeolet	MR	2014
