= List of members of the Parliament of the Brussels-Capital Region, 2004–2009 =

This is a list of the members of the Brussels Parliament, between 2004 and 2009.

== Composition ==
The elections took place in 2004.

Party	Seats
French language group
Socialist Party; Parti Socialiste (PS)	26
Reformist Movement / Francophone Democratic Federalists; Mouvement Réformateur (MR) / Fédéralistes Démocrates Francophones (FDF)''	24
Humanist Democratic Centre; Centre Démocrate Humaniste (CDH)	11
Ecolo	7
National Front; Front National (FN)	4
Dutch language group
Flemish Interest; Vlaams Belang	5
Open Flemish Liberals and Democrats; Open Vlaamse Liberalen en Democraten (Open VLD)	4
Socialist Party – Differently / Spirit; Socialistische Partij Anders (SP.A) / Spirit	3
Christian Democratic and Flemish; Christen-Democratisch en Vlaams (CD&V)	3
Green! Groen!	1
Independent	1
Total	89

== List of members ==
Name	Fraction	Language group
Fouad Ahidar	SP.A-Spirit	Dutch language group
Els Ampe	VLD	Dutch language group
Paul Arku	FN	French language group
Mohamed Azzouzi	PS	French language group
Jan Beghin	SP.A-Spirit	Dutch language group
Françoise Bertieaux	MR	French language group
Sfia Bouarfa	PS	French language group
Dominique Braeckman	Ecolo	French language group
Adelheid Byttebier	Groen!	Dutch language group
Danielle Caron	CDH	French language group
Michèle Carthe	PS	French language group
Jos Chabert	CD&V	Dutch language group
Mohammadi Chahid	PS	French language group
Michel Colson	MR	French language group
René Coppens	VLD	Dutch language group
Alain Daems	Ecolo	French language group
Mohamed Daif	PS	French language group
Olivier De Clippele	MR	French language group
Jacques De Coster	PS	French language group
Willy Decourty	PS	French language group
Magda De Galan	PS	French language group
Julie de Groote	CDH	French language group
Yves de Jonghe d'Ardoye d'Erp	MR	French language group
Carla Dejonghe	VLD	Dutch language group
Céline Delforge	Ecolo	French language group
Stéphane de Lobkowicz	CDH	French language group
Johan Demol	Vlaams Belang	Dutch language group
Serge de Patoul	MR	French language group
Brigitte De Pauw	CD&V	Dutch language group
Amina Derbaki Sbaï	PS	French language group
Alain Destexhe	MR	French language group
Vincent De Wolf	MR	French language group
Bea Diallo	PS	French language group
Christos Doulkeridis	Ecolo	French language group
Hervé Doyen	CDH	French language group
Willem Draps	MR	French language group
Josy Dubié	Ecolo	French language group
André du Bus de Warnaffe	CDH	French language group
Dominique Dufourny	MR	French language group
Mustapha El Karouni	MR	French language group
Ahmed El Ktibi	PS	French language group
Nadia El Yousfi	PS	French language group
Isabelle Emmery	PS	French language group
Frederic Erens	Vlaams Belang	Dutch language group
Hamza Fassi-Fihri	CDH	French language group
Julie Fiszman	PS	French language group
Céline Fremault	CDH	French language group
Paul Galand	Ecolo	French language group
Nathalie Gilson	MR	French language group
Didier Gosuin	MR	French language group
Denis Grimberghs	CDH	French language group
Michèle Hasquin-Nahum	MR	French language group
Véronique Jamoulle	PS	French language group
Mohammed Lahlali	PS	French language group
Alain Leduc	PS	French language group
Marion Lemesre	MR	French language group
Dominiek Lootens-Stael	Vlaams Belang	Dutch language group
Rachid Madrane	PS	French language group
Bertin Mampaka Mankamba	CDH	French language group
Isabelle Molenberg	MR	French language group
Fatima Moussaoui	CDH	French language group
Anne-Sylvie Mouzon	PS	French language group
Emin Ozkara	PS	French language group
Martine Payfa	MR	French language group
Caroline Persoons	MR	French language group
Yaron Pesztat	Ecolo	French language group
Erland Pison	Vlaams Belang	Dutch language group
Philippe Pivin	MR	French language group
Olivia P'Tito	PS	French language group
Marie-Paule Quix	SP.A-Spirit	Dutch language group
Souad Razzouk	PS	French language group
Joël Riguelle	CDH	French language group
François Roelants du Vivier	MR	French language group
Mahfoudh Romdhani	PS	French language group
Audrey Rorive	FN	French language group
Jacqueline Rousseaux	MR	French language group
Fatiha Saidi	PS	French language group
Françoise Schepmans	MR	French language group
Patrick Sessler	FN	French language group
Valérie Seyns	Vlaams Belang	Dutch language group
Anne Swaelens	PS	French language group
Viviane Teitelbaum	MR	French language group
Eric Tomas	PS	French language group
Jos Van Assche	Independent	Dutch language group
Walter Vandenbossche	CD&V	Dutch language group
Christiane Van Nieuwenhoven	FN	French language group
Jean-Luc Vanraes	VLD	Dutch language group
Rudi Vervoort	PS	French language group
Alain Zenner	MR	French language group

== Sources ==
- "Les députés". The Brussels Parliament. Archived from the original on 2008-05-27. - Only available in French and Dutch.
