= Van Moer =

Van Moer is a surname. Notable people with the surname include:

- Brent Van Moer (born 1998), Belgian cyclist
- Edmond Van Moer (1875–?), Belgian archer
- Reinilde Van Moer (born 1956), Belgian politician
- Wilfried Van Moer (born 1945), Belgian footballer and manager
