= Alexandra Colen =

Belgian politician (born 1955)

Member of the Chamber of Representatives
- In office 1995–2014

Personal details
- Born: Alexandra Maria Catherine Colen; 9 July 1955 (age 70) Dublin, Ireland
- Party: Vlaams Blok (1995-2004); Vlaams Belang (2004-2013)
- Spouse: Paul Beliën

Alexandra Maria Catherine Colen (born 9 July 1955) is a Belgian politician. She was member of the Belgian Chamber of Representatives for the Vlaams Belang party from 21 May 1995 until May 2014. She holds a PhD in linguistics, and is known for her advocacy of strict Catholic ethics.

== Biography ==
Colen was born in the Rotunda Hospital in the Irish capital Dublin. Her mother was a sister of the poet Aleidis Dierick and a niece of the actor and TV presenter Wies Andersen. Her father Alex Colen was living in political exile in Ireland at the time. The family moved back to Flanders when she was 12. She studied philosophy at the University of Ghent and the University of Reading in the United Kingdom. She graduated with a PhD in linguistics in 1982. During her studies, she was a member of the Katholiek Vlaams Hoogstudentenverbond.

She is married to Paul Beliën, the editor of the conservative-libertarian blog The Brussels Journal. From 1978 to 1983 she worked as a professor and an assistant professor at Ghent University before becoming a stay at home mother in 1983.

Within the Vlaams Blok and its successor party Vlaams Belang, Colen is seen as a leading voice of the religious conservative (essentially Catholic) wing of the party, even holding prayer sessions within the parliament building together with other Vlaams Belang representatives such as Tanguy Veys. She is an advocate of Flemish independence, free trade and is an opponent of abortion, euthanasia and LGBT rights.

She was re-elected as second candidate on the Antwerp Vlaams Belang list in 1995, 2003, and 2007. She was lijstduwer in 2010 but managed to get re-elected. Colen quit Vlaams Belang in 2013 and remained an independent member of the Chamber until the end of the legislative period 2014.
