= Uyttersprot =

Uyttersprot is a Dutch surname. Notable people with the surname include:

- Karel Uyttersprot (born 1949), Belgian politician
- Ilse Uyttersprot (1967–2020), Belgian politician
