= Centre for the New Europe =

Belgium-based free-market think tank

The Centre for the New Europe (CNE) was a free-market think tank founded in 1993 by Paul Belien and based in Brussels. It focused on EU issues such as economic growth, managing environmental change, health and welfare policy, competition policy, and innovation.

The first director-general was Paul Fabra, former journalist at Le Monde (chief editor economics). Tim Evans was president and director-general from 2002 to 2005. Most recently, it was headed by Stephen Pollard, a British journalist and policy expert who previously worked at the Fabian Society and the Social Market Foundation. On 16 October 2008, Pollard announced his resignation from CNE to assume the position of editor of The Jewish Chronicle.

As of 2005, CNE had received $40,000 from ExxonMobil.

The think tank was dissolved in 2009.
