= Isabelle Emmery =

Belgian politician

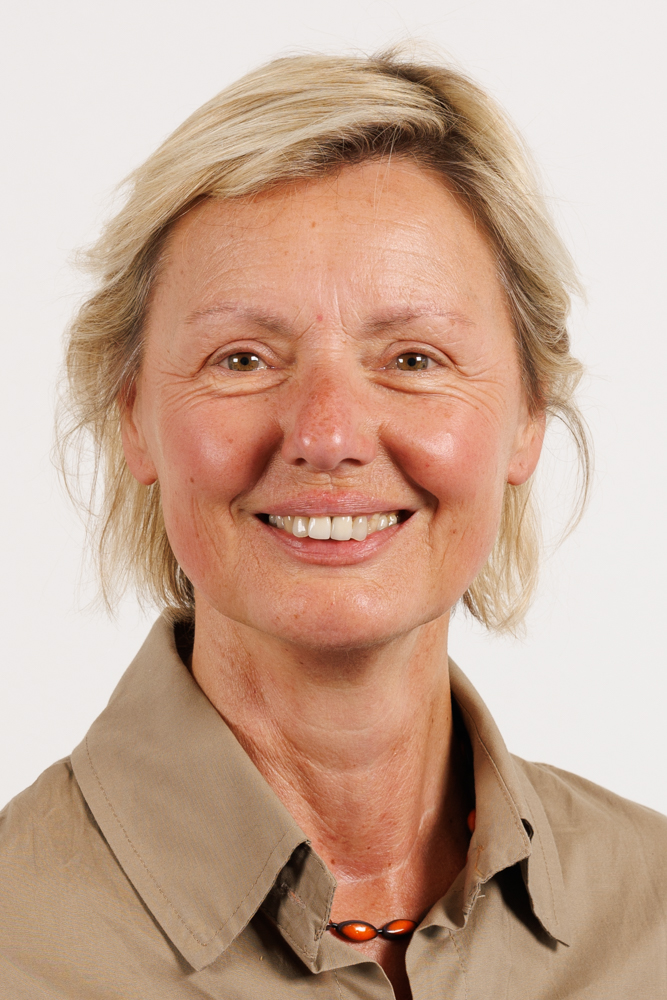
- Isabelle Emmery

Member of the Parliament of the French Community
- Incumbent
- Assumed office 2014

Member of the Parliament of the Brussels-Capital Region
- Incumbent
- Assumed office 2014

Member of the Chamber of Representatives of Belgium
- In office 2011–2014

Personal details
- Born: 3 July 1966 (age 59) Anderlecht
- Party: Socialist

Isabelle Emmery (born 3 July 1966) is a Belgian politician from the Socialist Party (PS).

== Biography ==
Isabelle Emmery graduated as a licentiate in economics from the Université libre de Bruxelles. She began her professional career in 1989 as an attaché of the PS faction in the Chamber of Representatives, where she followed the subjects of economy and infrastructure. She was then, from 1995 to 1999, advisor for housing in the office of Éric Tomas, Secretary of State in the Government of the Brussels-Capital Region.

In June 1999, Emmery was elected to the Brussels-Capital Parliament for the PS , where she remained until 2009 and became vice-chair of the PS faction. From January 2002 to June 2009, she also sat in the Parliament of the French Community. She was a member of the Culture, Youth, Media and Cinemas Committee from 2002 to 2004 and of the Education Committee from 2006 to 2009.

In June 2009, Emmery was not re-elected as a member of the Brussels parliament. A year later, in the federal elections of June 2010, she was the third successor on the PS party list for the Chamber of Representatives in the constituency of Brussels-Halle-Vilvoorde. In December 2011, she effectively became a member of the Chamber as successor to Laurette Onkelinx, who became a minister, and remained there until May 2014. Since May 2014, she has been a member of the Brussels-Capital Parliament again, where she has been secretary since 2019. In addition, she sat again in the Parliament of the French Community from June 2014 to September 2021. This time, Emmery was second vice-chair from 2014 to 2019, vice-chair of the Culture and Children Committee from 2014 to 2019, chair of the Advisory Committee on Equality between Men and Women from 2014 to 2015 and vice-chair of the Culture, Children, Health, Media and Women's Rights Committee from 2019 to 2021.

At the local political level, Emmery was a member of the OCMW council of Anderlecht from 1994 to 2000 and a municipal councillor from January 2001 to March 2022. She also held various administrative positions: from 1995 to 2000 she was chair of the Local Agency for Employment in Anderlecht and since 2007 she has been chair of the cultural centre Escale du Nord. She was also chair of the liberal association (Vrijzinnigheid) Amis de la Morale laïque from 1999 to 2013 and has been chair of the Fondation l'Estacade since 2009, a foundation that offers financial support to students in art education.

She has also been appointed a Knight in the Order of Leopold.

== See also ==
- List of members of the Parliament of the Brussels-Capital Region, 2004–2009
- List of members of the Chamber of Representatives of Belgium, 2010–2014
- Brussels-Halle-Vilvoorde (Chamber of Representatives constituency)
- List of members of the Parliament of the Brussels-Capital Region, 2024–2029
