= The Brussels Journal =

The Brussels Journal is a conservative blog founded by the Flemish journalist Paul Beliën. It is consistently named as one of the counter-jihad movement's main channels. It was founded in 2005, and has both an English language section with various international contributions, and a Dutch section.

The Brussels Journal bills itself as a member of the OpinionJournal Federation but does not appear among the list of members on OpinionJournal's own site. The blog appears to have been inactive since 2015.

== Political affiliations ==
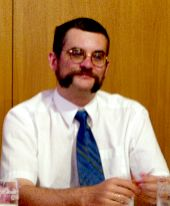
Paul Beliën, editor and founder of The Brussels Journal

Paul Beliën's wife, Alexandra Colen, was a parliamentary member of Vlaams Belang. Beliën himself has been at odds with the party at times, criticizing the party for its populism. Beliën has since been employed as an advisor by Geert Wilders, leader of the Dutch, right-wing Party for Freedom.

== Notable debates ==
=== Allegations of racism ===
According to a Wall Street Journal editorial by Bret Stephens, after a 17-year-old Belgian boy, Joe Van Holsbeeck, was murdered by Romani people from Poland, Paul Beliën wrote an article calling for the decriminalization of the possession of "self-defense weapons." The article was titled "Geef ons Wapens!" (Give us Weapons!). The government anti-discrimination agency Center for Equal Opportunities and Opposition to Racism claimed the article constituted incitement to violence and warned that unless it was removed, the blog would face state prosecution, although the words Muslim or Islam were not used in the article and the following sentence, by some claimed to be a "quote" was not in the article:

Muslims are predators that have learned from childhood (...) during the yearly feast of the sacrifice (...) how to slaughter warm herd animals.

Beliën removed the article. The article has been noted as an important event in the development of a harsher climate towards immigrants in Belgium. The incident caused the site to shift to English-centric in order to be able to present future such cases to the international media.

In June, Belgian police summoned Beliën for questioning regarding several articles, he wrote for The Brussels Journal. According to Beliën the police continued to invite him in for questioning but he refused to show up.

On 27 July 2011, Belgian media reported that the Belgian security agencies will ask the federal prosecutor to open a case file investigating relations between The Brussels Journal and Anders Behring Breivik, the confessed perpetrator of the 2011 Norway attacks. The security agencies would want clarity about a number of articles that have been published on the web site, and that are part of 2083: A European Declaration of Independence, Breivik's manifesto.

=== Jyllands-Posten Muhammad cartoons controversy ===
The Brussels Journal was the first news and opinion site to cover the Jyllands-Posten Muhammad cartoons controversy in English, bringing it to the attention to US bloggers, including Michelle Malkin, and the mainstream media.

The Brussels Journal republished the cartoons. This action was called a "deliberate provocation by the neocons," by an editorial in the Dutch-language Knack magazine. According to Knack, Brussels Journal's aim was to "make Americans and Europeans believe that all Muslims are violent and dangerous, after which the clash in Palestine, Iran and Syria can really kick off."

== Contributors ==
The Brussels Journal has featured contributions by Diana West, Daniel Hannan, John Laughland, Fjordman, Tiberge, Koenraad Elst, Takuan Seiyo, Jos Verhulst, and Matthias Storme, among others.
