= Paul Beliën =

Belgian journalist

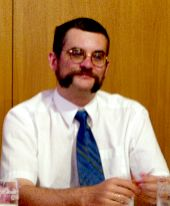
- Beliën in 2003
- Born: 1959 (age 66–67)
- Education: University of Ghent (LLM); University of Buckingham (PhD)
- Occupations: Political operative, writer, former journalist and blog editor
- Political party: Party for Freedom
- Spouse: Alexandra Colen
- Children: 5

Paul Beliën (born 1959) is a Flemish Belgian political operative, writer, and former journalist and founder of the right-wing blog The Brussels Journal.

Beliën has a Master of Laws with specialisations in European and social security law from the University of Ghent, and a Ph.D. in international studies from the University of Buckingham. He has been vice president of the International Free Press Society, a senior editor at the Hudson Institute, director of the Middle East Forum's Islamist Watch, and a writer for the Gatestone Institute. More recently, he was the chief of staff for Geert Wilders.

He is an advocate of Flemish independence, free trade and is an opponent of abortion, euthanasia and homosexuality. He is an Americophile, and has been actively opposed to Muslim immigration to Europe as part of the counter-jihad movement.

== Career ==
=== Early career until 2005 ===
Beliën worked as a journalist for Gazet van Antwerpen from 1982, until he was fired in 1990 for leaking a story about King Baudouin's opposition to legalised abortion in The Wall Street Journal. He was one of the nine founders of the party Open Flemish Liberals and Democrats (VLD) in 1992, but soon left the party due to the party moving towards the left under the influence of Guy Verhofstadt. In 1993 he contributed to the book Visions of Europe alongside Margaret Thatcher among others.

He co-founded the Brussels-based Centre for the New Europe in 1993, a neoliberal euroskeptic think tank with attention to social conservative issues affiliated with the Bruges Group, together with lawyer Fernand Keuleneer, after having founded the magazine Nucleus together in 1990. Beliën served as research director for the think tank until 2000, but his politics shifted more rightwards towards secessionist and nationalist positions from the end of the decade.

From 2000 to 2005, when his wife Alexandra Colen served as a member of parliament, Beliën and Colen published a secessionist quarterly journal together entitled Secessie: Kwartaalblad voor de Studie van Separatisme en Directe Democratie.

=== The Brussels Journal (2005–10) ===
In 2005, Beliën founded The Brussels Journal, an anti-Islamist, euroskeptic, pro-American blog, which was run by the Society for the Advancement of Freedom in Europe, a Swiss non-profit organisation. In 2006 it was one of the few websites that republished the Jyllands-Posten Muhammad cartoons, which attracted some two million unique visitors to the site.

Beliën also compared Muslims to predators, and called for Belgium to decriminalise the possession of self-defense weapons in an article titled "Give us Weapons!" in 2006. The article caused a media storm, and led him to receive a letter from the Centre for Equal Opportunities and Opposition to Racism for "incitement to violence", ordering him to remove the post from the site or face prosecution. The conservative newspaper The Washington Times wrote that free speech was under attack in Belgium for the events.

In 2007, Beliën used his contacts with the Vlaams Belang party to take part in hosting the international counter-jihad conference in Brussels, which brought together at least seventy organisations and individuals for two days of speeches and networking opportunities.

Beliën served as editor-in-chief of The Brussels Journal from 2005 to 2010.

=== Later activities (2010–present) ===
Beliën has later been described as a key ideologue of the Dutch Party for Freedom (PVV), having served as a ghostwriter, speech writer, foreign secretary, fundraiser and personal assistant for Geert Wilders since 2010. He served as chief of staff for Wilders until 2018, after which he has worked in the European Parliament.

== Personal life ==
Beliën is married to Alexandra Colen, a former member of the Belgian Federal Parliament for the political party Vlaams Belang, formerly Vlaams Blok.

== Publications ==
- Beliën, Paul (1992). Abortus, het grote taboe [Abortion, the great taboo] (in Dutch). Roularta Books. ISBN 978-9054660156.
- Beliën, Paul (1993). Hill, Stephen (ed.). Visions of Europe: Summing up the political choices. Gerald Duckworth & Co. ISBN 978-0715624968.
- Beliën, Paul (2004). "European health care: the cost of solidarity and the promise of risk-adjusted consumer-driven health care". In Herzlinger, Regina E. (ed.). Consumer-Driven Health Care: Implications for Providers, Payers, and Policymakers. Jossey-Bass. ISBN 0-7879-5258-3.
- Beliën, Paul (2005). A Throne in Brussels: Britain, the Saxe-Coburgs and the Belgianisation of Europe. Imprint Academic. ISBN 978-1845400330.
