= Els Demol =

Belgian politician

Member of the Chamber of Representatives
- Incumbent
- Assumed office 6 July 2010

Personal details
- Born: 28 January 1958 (age 68) Leuven, Flemish Brabant
- Party: N-VA
- Website: http://www.n-va.be/cv/els-demol

Els Demol (born 28 January 1958) is a Belgian politician and is affiliated to the N-VA. She was elected as a member of the Belgian Chamber of Representatives in 2010.
