= Minneke De Ridder =

Belgian politician

Member of the Chamber of Representatives
- Incumbent
- Assumed office 6 July 2010

Personal details
- Born: 2 December 1980 (age 45) Lier, Antwerp
- Party: N-VA
- Website: http://www.n-va.be/cv/minneke-de-ridder

Minneke De Ridder (born 2 December 1980 in Lier) is a Belgian politician and is affiliated with the N-VA. She was elected as a member of the Belgian Chamber of Representatives in 2010.
