= Maya Detiège =

Belgian politician

Maya Detiège (born 30 August 1967, in Antwerp) is a Belgian politician. She is a member of the Flemish social-democratic party. At the moment, Detiège is a federal representative.

== Family ==
She is the daughter of the former mayor of Antwerp, Leona Detiège, and granddaughter of Frans Detiège, also a former mayor of Antwerp.

Political offices
Preceded by Marcel Oberweis	President of the Benelux Parliament; 2015–2016	Succeeded by André Postema
