= Miranda Van Eetvelde =

Belgian politician (born 1959)

Member of the Chamber of Representatives
- In office 6 July 2010 – 2019

Personal details
- Born: 24 September 1959 (age 66) Zele, East Flanders
- Party: N-VA
- Website: http://www.n-va.be/cv/miranda-van-eetvelde

Miranda Van Eetvelde (born 24 September 1959 in Zele) is a Belgian politician and is affiliated to the N-VA. She was elected as a member of the Belgian Chamber of Representatives in 2010, where she remained until 2019.
