= Ingeborg De Meulemeester =

Belgian politician

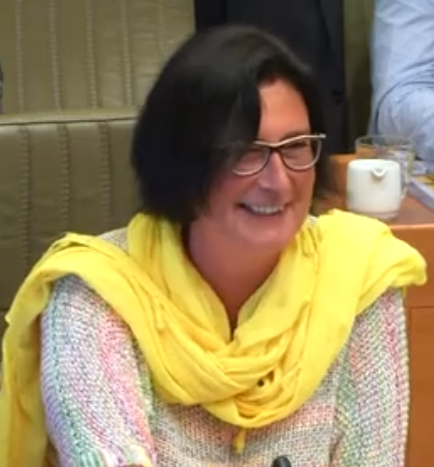
- Speaking in 2018

Member of the Chamber of Representatives
- Incumbent
- Assumed office 6 July 2010

Personal details
- Born: 14 April 1965 (age 60) Kortrijk, West Flanders, Belgium
- Party: N-VA
- Website: http://www.n-va.be/cv/ingeborg-de-meulemeester

Ingeborg De Meulemeester (born 14 April 1965, in Kortrijk) is a Belgian politician and is affiliated to the N-VA. She was elected as a member of the Belgian Chamber of Representatives in 2010.
