= SP.A–Spirit =

The SP.a–SPIRIT was a Belgian electoral coalition between the Flemish parties Socialist Party Different (SP.a) and Spirit. In the general elections on June 10, 2007, the Social Liberal party formed an electoral alliance with the Socialist Party Different (sp.a) and won 14 of the 88 Flemish seats in the House of Representatives and 4 of the 40 Flemish seats in the Senate.

The Social Liberal Party ended its collaboration with SP.A in the autumn of 2008, following a scandal that forced its leader, Bettina Geysen, to resign.
