= Wies Andersen =

Belgian actor and presenter (1936–2023)

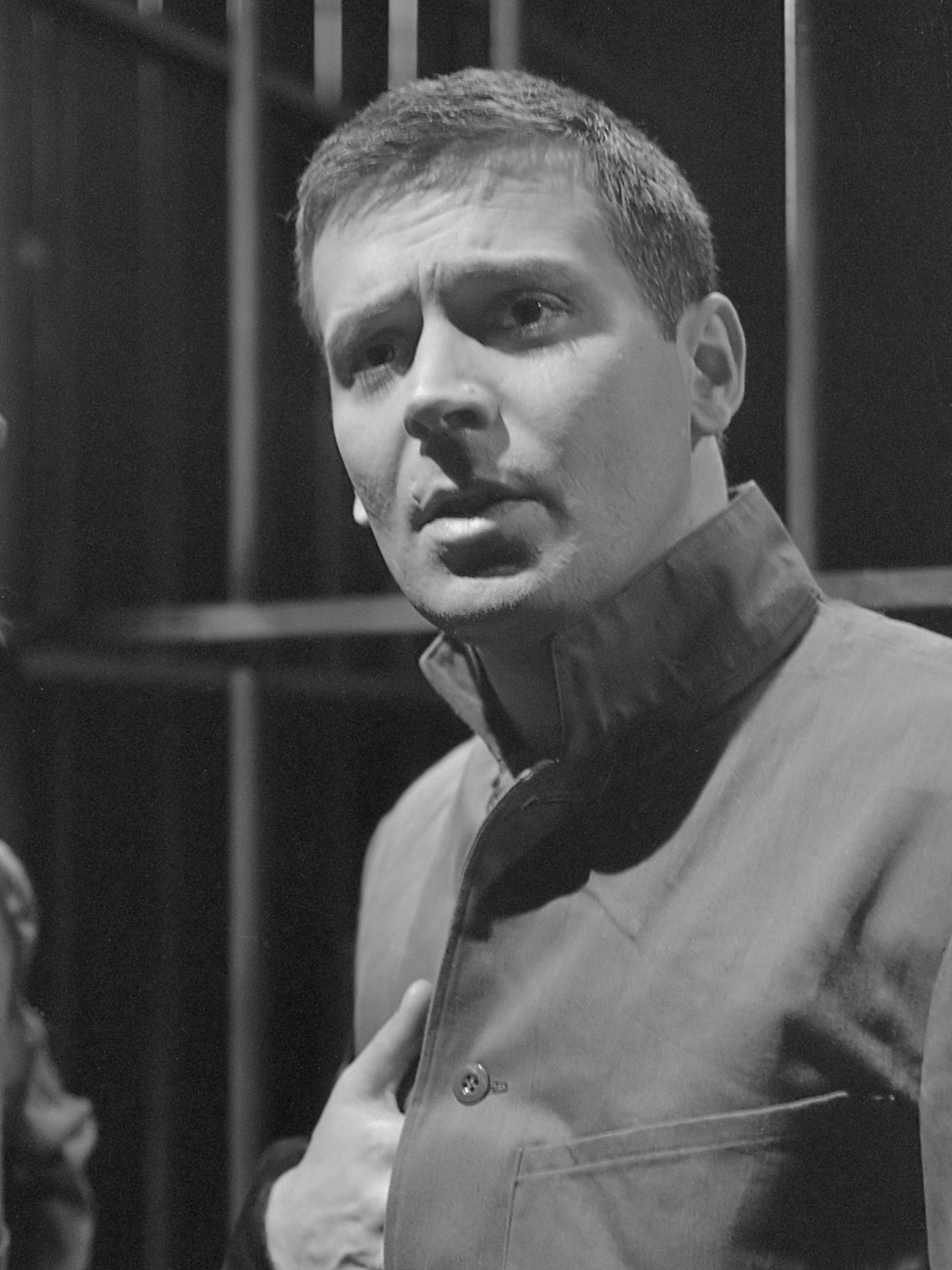
- Andersen in 1966
- Born: Alois De Bois; 6 February 1936; Sint-Mariaburg, Brasschaat, Antwerp, Belgium
- Died: 21 October 2023 (aged 87)
- Occupation: Actor

Alois De Bois (6 February 1936 – 21 October 2023), professionally known as Wies Andersen, was a Belgian actor, television presenter and film director, whose career spanned about 40 years.

== Career ==
After studying theatre, in the second half of the 1960s Andersen had his breakout role as Jules Maigret's assistant in the BRT television series Commissaris Maigret. He was best known as presenter of the show De Wies Andersen Show, broadcast on BRT in the late 1970s. In the early 1990s, he reprised the show on VTM. As an actor and a director he is best known for Jonny & Jessy, a 1972 film he starred alongside Rocco Granata. He also directed several documentaries, was active as a stage actor, founded a television production company, and worked as a sport journalist, specialized in auto racing and horse racing.

== Personal life and death ==
Andersen was married to actress Dora van der Groen for about 20 years. After surviving a heart attack in 2019, he died on 21 October 2023, at the age of 87.
