= Jan Van Esbroeck =

Belgian politician

Member of the Chamber of Representatives
- Incumbent
- Assumed office 6 July 2010

Personal details
- Born: 30 September 1968 (age 57) Mechelen, Antwerp
- Party: N-VA
- Website: http://www.n-va.be/cv/jan-van-esbroeck

Jan Van Esbroeck (born 30 September 1968 in Mechelen) is a Belgian politician and is affiliated to the N-VA. He was elected as a member of the Belgian Chamber of Representatives in 2010.
