= Franco Seminara =

Belgian politician (1958–2026)

Member of the Senate of Belgium
- In office 25 June 2009 – 13 June 2010
- Preceded by: Olga Zrihen
- In office 11 January 2007 – 10 June 2007

Member of the Chamber of Representatives of Belgium
- In office 13 June 2010 – 25 May 2014

Personal details
- Born: 18 January 1958 Frameries, Belgium
- Died: 23 June 2026 (aged 68) Boussu, Belgium
- Party: PS
- Occupation: Civil servant

Franco Seminara (18 January 1958 – 23 June 2026) was a Belgian politician. A member of the Socialist Party, he served in the Senate from January to June 2007 and from 2009 to 2010; he also served in the Chamber of Representatives from 2010 to 2014.

Seminara died in Boussu on 23 June 2026, at the age of 68.
