= Bert Maertens =

Belgian politician

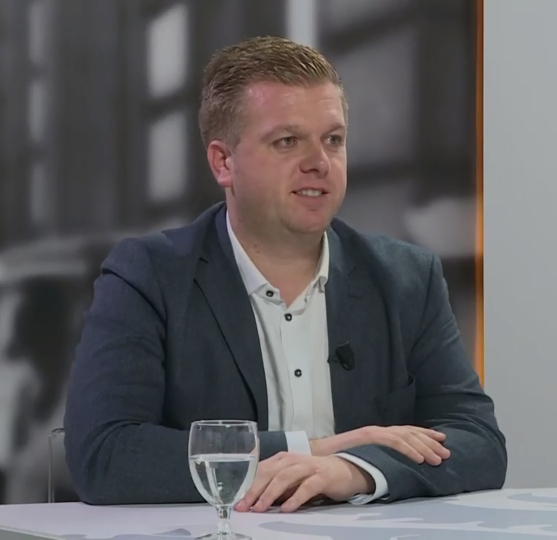
- Bert Maertens in 2019

Member of the Chamber of Representatives
- In office 6 July 2010 – 28 April 2014

Personal details
- Born: 16 November 1981 (age 44) Izegem, West Flanders
- Party: N-VA
- Website: http://www.n-va.be/cv/bert-maertens

Bert Maertens (born 16 November 1981 in Izegem) is a Belgian politician and is affiliated to the N-VA. He replaced Geert Bourgeois and then Manu Beuselinck as a member of the Belgian Chamber of Representatives between 2010 and 2014.
