= Leen Dierick =

Belgian politician

- Born: Dendermonde
- Occupation: politician
- Political party: Christian Democratic and Flemish

Leen Dierick is a politician from Belgium. She became mayor of Dendermonde in 2024.

== Biography ==
Leen Dierick was born in Dendermonde on May 2, 1978 and is the daughter of Maurits Dierick, who was mayor of Dendermonde from 1986 until 1994.

In 2000, at age 22 she became a municipal council member. From 2001 until the end of 2023 she served as schepen. In January 2024 she became mayor of Dendermonde.

In 2003 she ran for a seat in the Chamber of Representatives, but failed to get elected. In June 2007 she ran again and did get elected. In June 2010, May 2014 and May 2019 she got reelected.

In 2019 she introduced a bill that would oblige businesses to provide a way for electronic payment.
