= Karel Uyttersprot =

Belgian politician

Member of the Chamber of Representatives
- Incumbent
- Assumed office 6 July 2010

Personal details
- Born: 10 July 1949 (age 76) Denderbelle (Lebbeke), East Flanders
- Party: N-VA
- Website: http://www.n-va.be/cv/karel-uyttersprot

Karel Uyttersprot (born 10 July 1949) is a Belgian politician and is affiliated to the N-VA. He was elected as a member of the Belgian Chamber of Representatives in 2010.
