= Koenraad Degroote =

Belgian politician

Member of the Chamber of Representatives
- Incumbent
- Assumed office 6 July 2010

Personal details
- Born: 30 September 1959 (age 66) Kortrijk, West Flanders
- Party: N-VA
- Website: http://www.n-va.be/cv/koenraad-degroote

Koenraad Degroote (born 30 September 1959 in Kortrijk) is a Belgian politician and is affiliated to the N-VA. He was elected as a member of the Belgian Chamber of Representatives in 2010.

He's mayor of Dentergem since 1989.
