= Veerle Wouters =

Belgian politician

Member of the Chamber of Representatives
- Incumbent
- Assumed office 6 July 2010

Personal details
- Born: 2 June 1974 (age 51) Tongeren, Limburg
- Party: N-VA (until 2016)
- Website: http://www.n-va.be/cv/veerle-wouters

Veerle Wouters (born 2 June 1974 in Hasselt) is a Belgian politician and is affiliated to the N-VA. She was elected as a member of the Belgian Chamber of Representatives in 2010.

Along with Hendrik Vuye, she quit N-VA on 21 September 2016.
