= Tanguy Veys =

Belgian politician

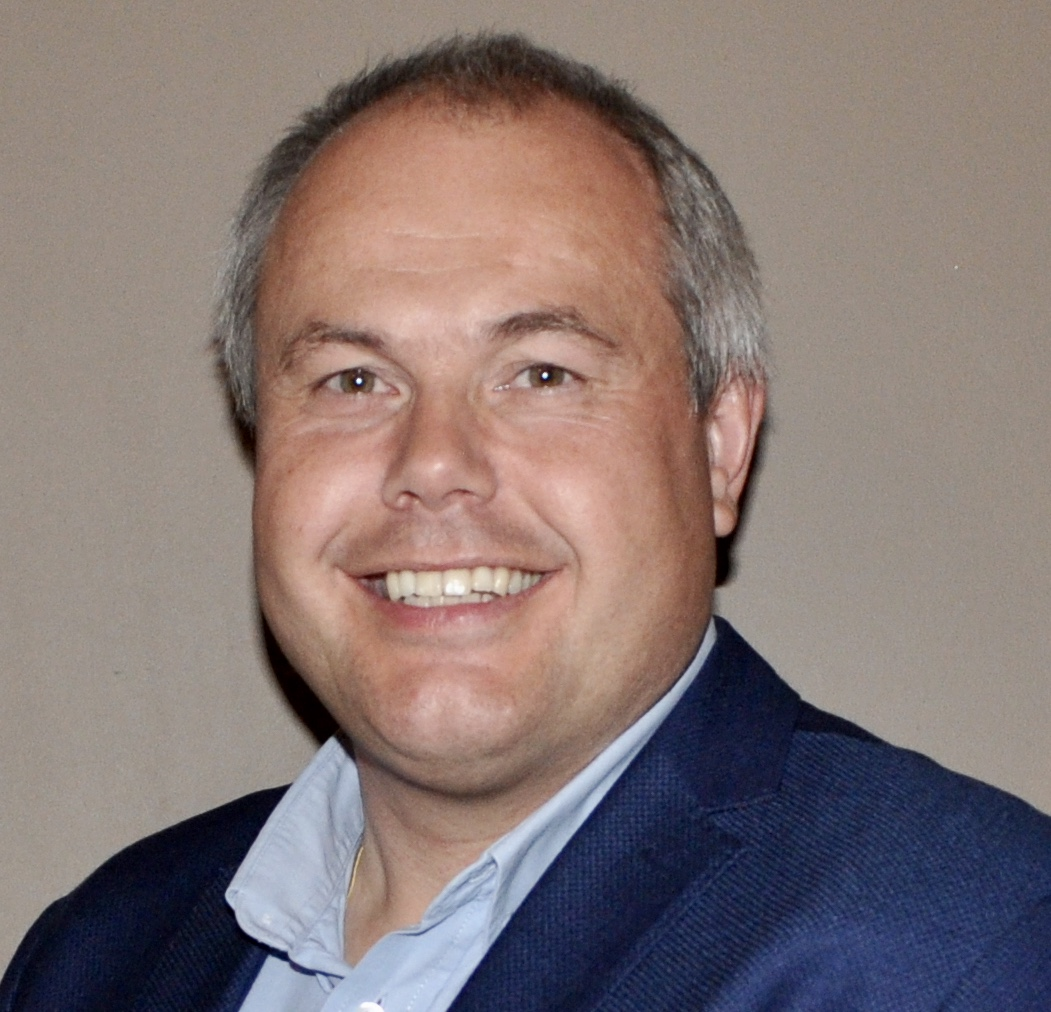
- Veys in 2018

Member of the Chamber of Representatives
- In office 2010–2014

Personal details
- Born: Tanguy Veys; 28 March 1972 (age 54) Ghent, Belgium
- Party: Vlaams Blok (1995-2004); Vlaams Belang (2004-2018)

Tanguy Veys (born 28 March 1972) is a Belgian retired politician formerly of the Vlaams Blok and then Vlaams Belang party.

Veys served as national president of the Vlaams Blok Jongeren, the youth wing of the Vlaams Blok party in 1995. He was also a spokesman for the Catholic-advocacy group Pro Vita in Ghent. Before entering politics, he worked as an advisor to Argenta bank.

Veys was elected to the Chamber of Representatives during the 2010 Belgian federal election for the West Flanders constituency. At the same time, he was elected as a municipal councilor in Blankenberge. In 2011, he took part in the 'Emirdağ needs you campaign with fellow VB politician Johan Deckmyn in which he visited Emirdağ, Turkey and met with local politicians there as part of a campaign to encourage people of Turkish origin living in Ghent to emigrate back to Turkey. This visit led to Sp.a politician Resul Tapmaz, the then Ghent alderman to make insulting statements about Vlaams Belang, after which Johan Deckmyn filed a complaint for slander and defamation. The public prosecutor's office eventually dismissed the complaint.

Veys' time in the Chamber became controversial when former classmates of his at high school, including television presenter Sven Ornelis, accused him of bullying. Veys acknowledged this on Twitter and apologised. It also emerged that in 2000 during Veys' time in the youth-wing of Vlaams Blok he had been convicted of assault following an altercation with a student in Ghent in 2001. Veys appealed the sentence and the charges were dropped.

Veys was expelled from Vlaams Belang in 2018, with party leader Van Grieken citing his aggressive manner of communication and behaviour. In the municipal elections of 2018, he founded a new localist party Better Blankenberge but it did not win any seats. Veys subsequently left politics and returned to private sector work.
