= Julie Fernandez-Fernandez =

Belgian politician

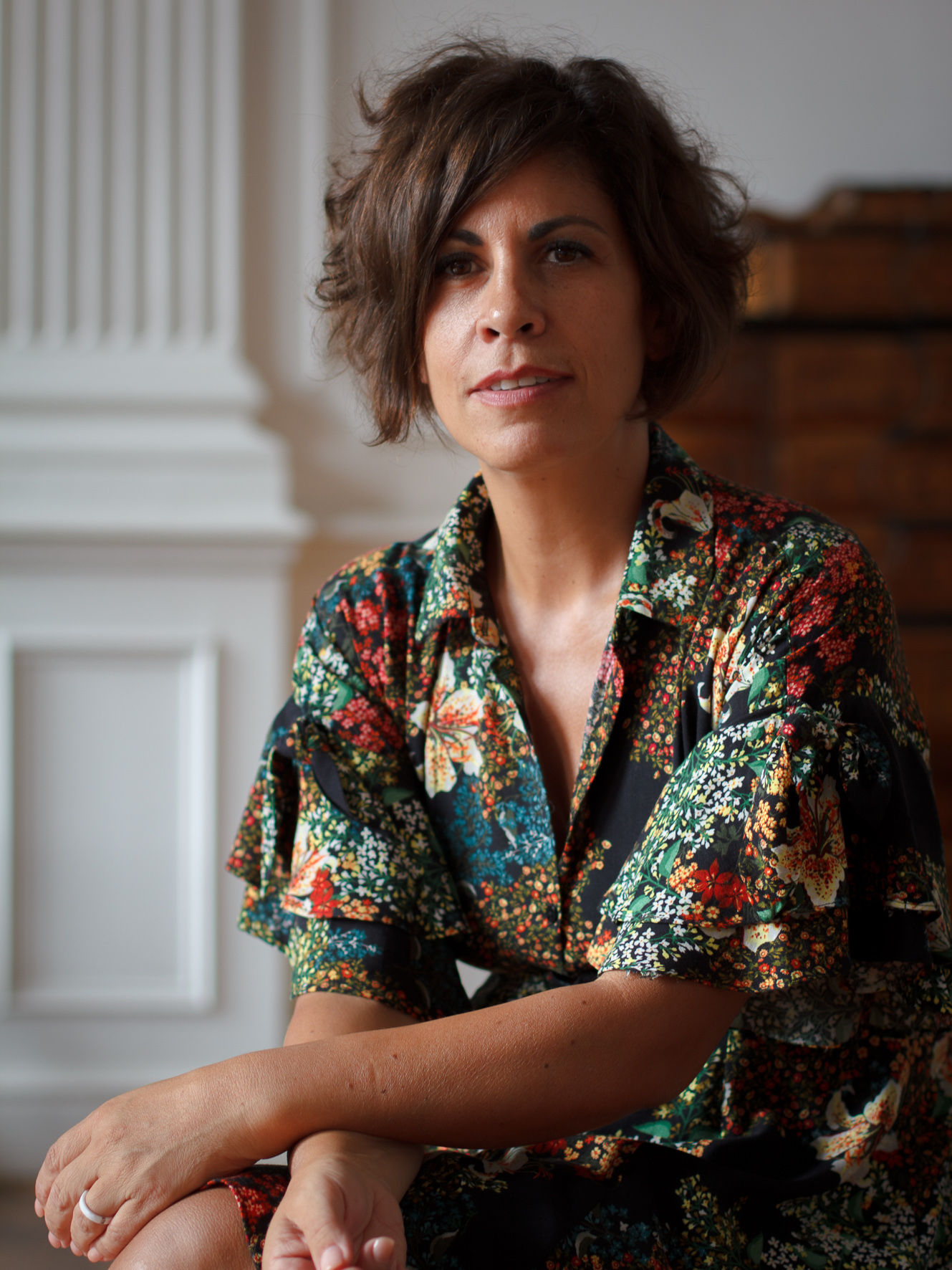
Julie Fernandez-Fernandez in 2017

Julie R. Fernandez-Fernandez (born 20 March 1972) is a Belgian politician for the Socialist Party who was a member of the Chamber of Representatives from 2010 to 2019.

She served as Secretary of State for Disabled Persons (Social Affairs and Public Health) in the Leterme I Government.
