= Siegfried Bracke =

Belgian politician

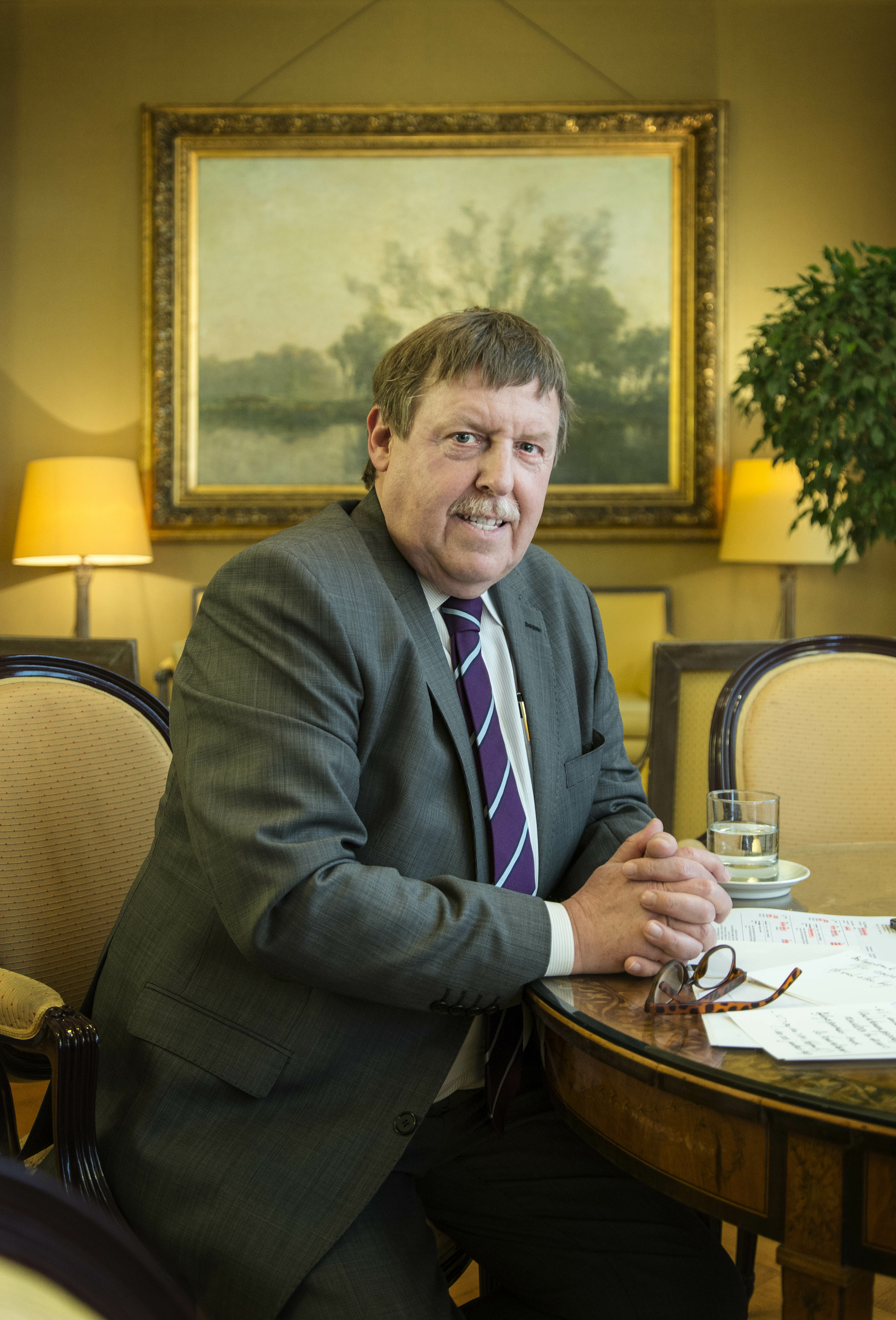

President of the Chamber of Representatives
- In office 14 October 2014 – 20 June 2019
- Preceded by: Patrick Dewael
- Succeeded by: Patrick Dewael

Personal details
- Born: 21 February 1953 (age 72); Ghent, Belgium
- Political party: New Flemish Alliance
- Website: Party website

Siegfried Theofiel Hortense Bracke (born 21 February 1953) is a former Belgian politician and is affiliated to the N-VA. He was elected as a member of the Belgian Chamber of Representatives in 2010. Bracke was born in Ghent. Before his political career he had a long career as a journalist, working for the VRT (Vlaamse Radio- en Televisieomroep - the primary Flemish-Belgian broadcasting company), hosting various politics-related shows such as Villa Politica and Bracke en Crabbé. He is a supporter of Orangism. After the elections in 2019 he ended his political career.

== Notes ==
Political offices
Preceded by Patrick Dewael	President of the Chamber of Representatives; 2014–2019	Incumbent
