= Reinilde Van Moer =

Belgian politician

Member of the Chamber of Representatives
- Incumbent
- Assumed office 6 July 2010

Personal details
- Born: 21 November 1956 (age 69) Willebroek, Antwerp
- Party: N-VA
- Website: http://www.n-va.be/cv/reinilde-van-moer

Reinilde Van Moer (born 21 November 1956 in Willebroek) is a Belgian politician and is affiliated to the N-VA. She was elected as a member of the Belgian Chamber of Representatives in 2010.
