= Sonja Becq =

Belgian politician

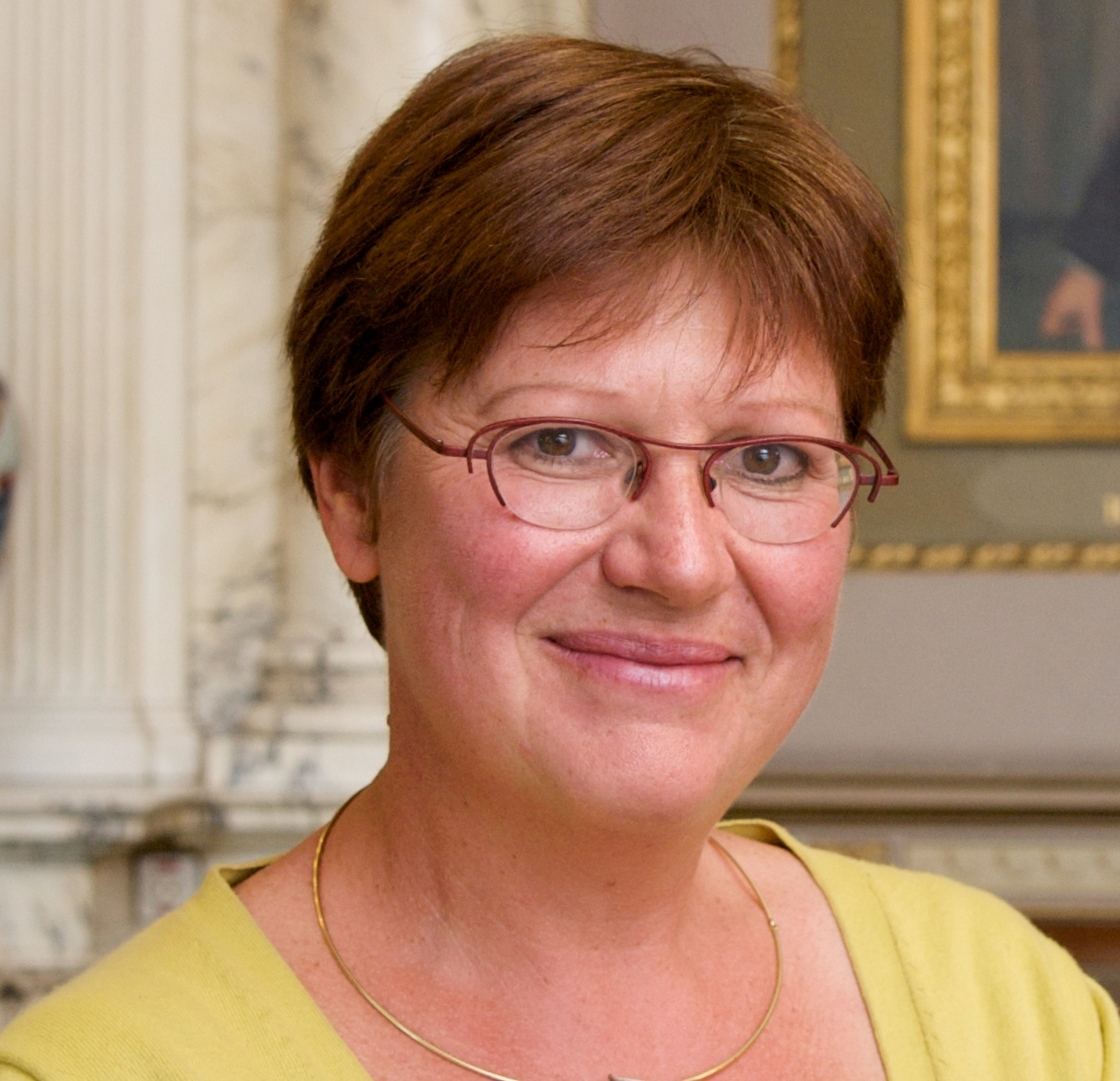
Sonja Becq

Sonja Becq (born 8 December 1957 in Duffel) is a Belgian politician and a federal representative since 2007 (for the constituency Brussels-Halle-Vilvoorde). She is a member of the Flemish Christian-democratic party (CD&V).

== Career ==
- 1995–2004: Member of the Flemish Parliament
- 2007–present: Member of the Chamber of Representatives (Federal parliament)
