= Sophie De Wit =

Belgian politician (born 1973)

Mayor of Aartselaar
- Incumbent
- Assumed office 2013

Member of the Chamber of Representatives
- Incumbent
- Assumed office 6 July 2010

Member of the Flemish Parliament
- In office 7 June 2009 – 6 July 2010

Personal details
- Born: 28 August 1973 (age 52) Deurne, Antwerp
- Party: N-VA
- Website: http://www.n-va.be/cv/sophie-de-wit

Sophie De Wit (born 28 August 1973 in Deurne) is a Belgian lawyer and politician and is affiliated to the N-VA. She was elected as a member of the Flemish Parliament in 2009. On 6 July 2010 her membership came to an end as she became that day a member of the Belgian Chamber of Representatives after being elected in June 2010.

De Wit graduated with a law degree from the Catholic University of Leuven in 1996 and then followed a one-year additional training in criminal law in Paris. She became a lawyer by profession.

She has also been mayor of Aartselaar since 2013.
