= Nahima Lanjri =

Belgian politician (born 1968)

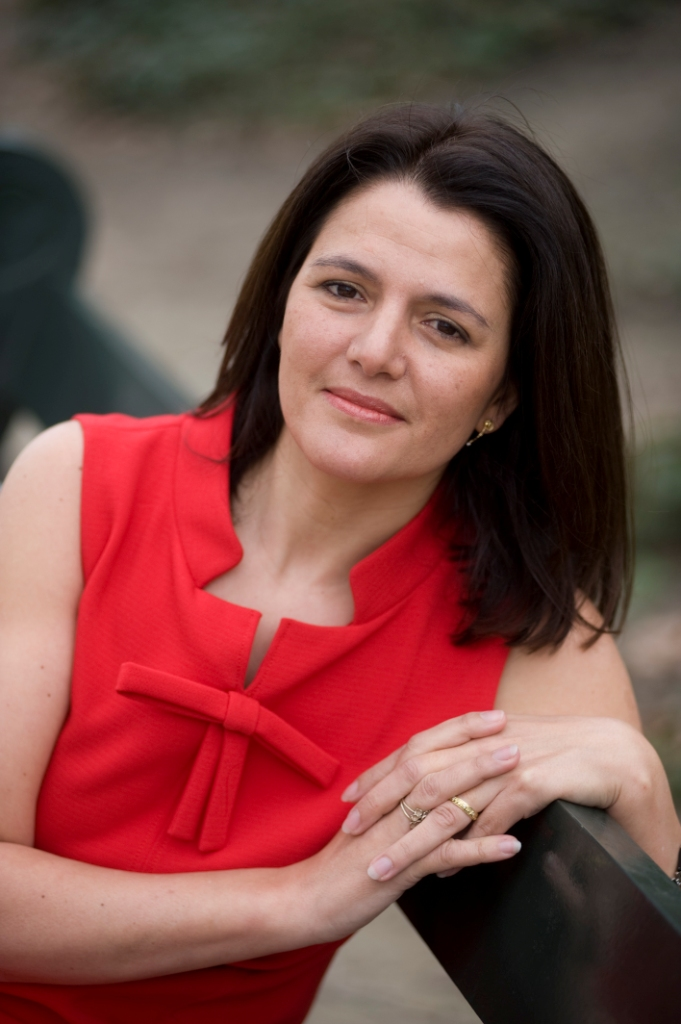

Senator
- In office 28 June 2007 – June 2011

Personal details
- Born: 17 February 1968 (age 58) Borgerhout
- Party: CD&V
- Website: www.nahima.be

Nahima Lanjri (born 17 February 1968 in Borgerhout) is a Belgian politician and a member of the CD&V. She is of Moroccan descent. She was elected as a member of the Belgian Senate in 2007.
