= Manu Beuselinck =

Belgian politician

Member of the Chamber of Representatives
- In office 6 July 2010 – November 2012

Personal details
- Born: 25 March 1970 (age 56) Ostend, West Flanders
- Party: New Flemish Alliance (N-VA)
- Website: http://www.n-va.be/cv/manu-beuselinck

Manu Beuselinck (born 25 March 1970 in Ostend) is a Belgian politician and is affiliated to the N-VA. He was elected as a member of the Belgian Chamber of Representatives in 2010.
