= Nadia Sminate =

Belgian politician (born 1981)

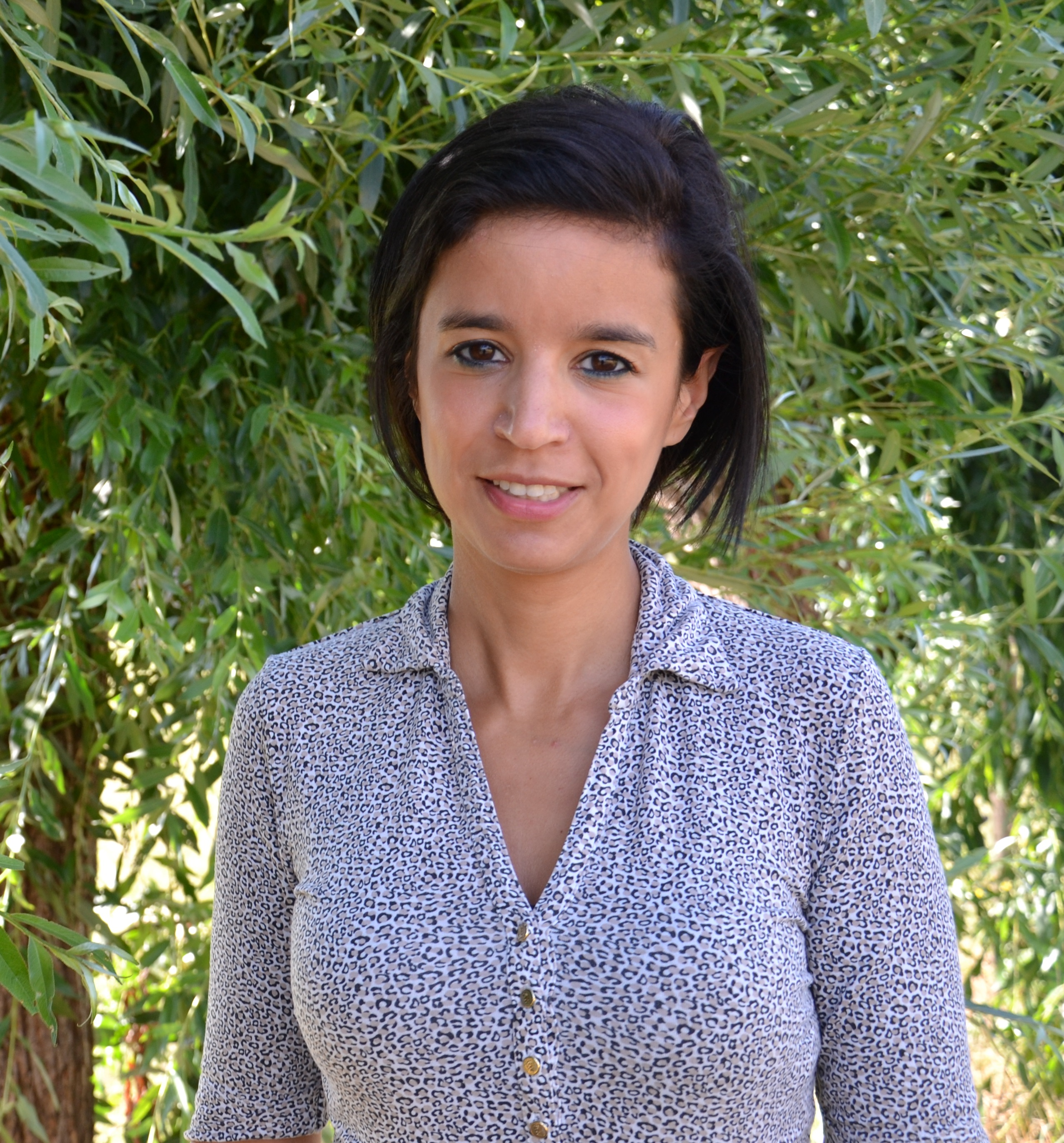

Member of the Chamber of Representatives
- Incumbent
- Assumed office 6 July 2010

Personal details
- Born: 29 December 1981 (age 44) Bonheiden, Antwerp
- Party: N-VA
- Website: http://www.n-va.be/cv/nadia-sminate

Nadia Sminate (born 29 December 1981 in Bonheiden) is a Belgian politician and is affiliated to the N-VA. She was elected as a member of the Belgian Chamber of Representatives in 2010.

== Early life ==
She was born to a Belgian (Flemish) mother and a Moroccan father. Sminate studied romance philology at the Vrije Universiteit Brussel, graduating in 2003. Afterwards she was an adult education teacher; first in Ganshoren and then in Meise-Jette. She was then a lingerie model for a while and was elected Miss Handelsgids.

== Political career ==
She became a member of the Flemish nationalist N-VA party, which she served in the Chamber of Representatives from 2007 to 2009. Thereafter she was promoted to staff member of Philippe Muyters, then Flemish Minister of Finance, Budget and Spatial Planning.

In the Belgian federal elections of 2010, she was elected from second place on the electoral list for the electoral district of Brussels-Halle-Vilvoorde as a Member of Parliament with 8,884 preferential votes.

In the municipal elections of 2012 she was the list leader for her party in Londerzeel. The party came up independently for the first time and obtained 21.6% of the vote. This made the party the third largest in the municipality after CD&V (31.5%) and the local LWD party (26.3%). On behalf of her party, she concluded an administrative agreement with CD&V and sp.a-Groen. At the beginning of 2014 she became Alderman of Finance, Budget and Personnel.

She was elected Flemish Member of Parliament in the 2014 Flemish elections. From the end of June 2014, she was part of the Bureau (daily board) of the Flemish Parliament as secretary. In January 2016, as agreed in the administrative agreement, she succeeded Jozef De Borger (CD&V) as Londerzeel's mayor. She was thus the first Flemish mayor with Moroccan roots. In the 2018 elections, Sminate's party won a big victory with 35.4%, but the N-VA ended up in the opposition this time.

She has also served as a state senator in the Senate since January 2019. In the Flemish elections of 26 May 2019, she was re-elected as a Flemish Member of Parliament. Since mid-June 2019, she has been third vice-president of this assembly.
