= Karolien Grosemans =

Belgian politician (born 1970)

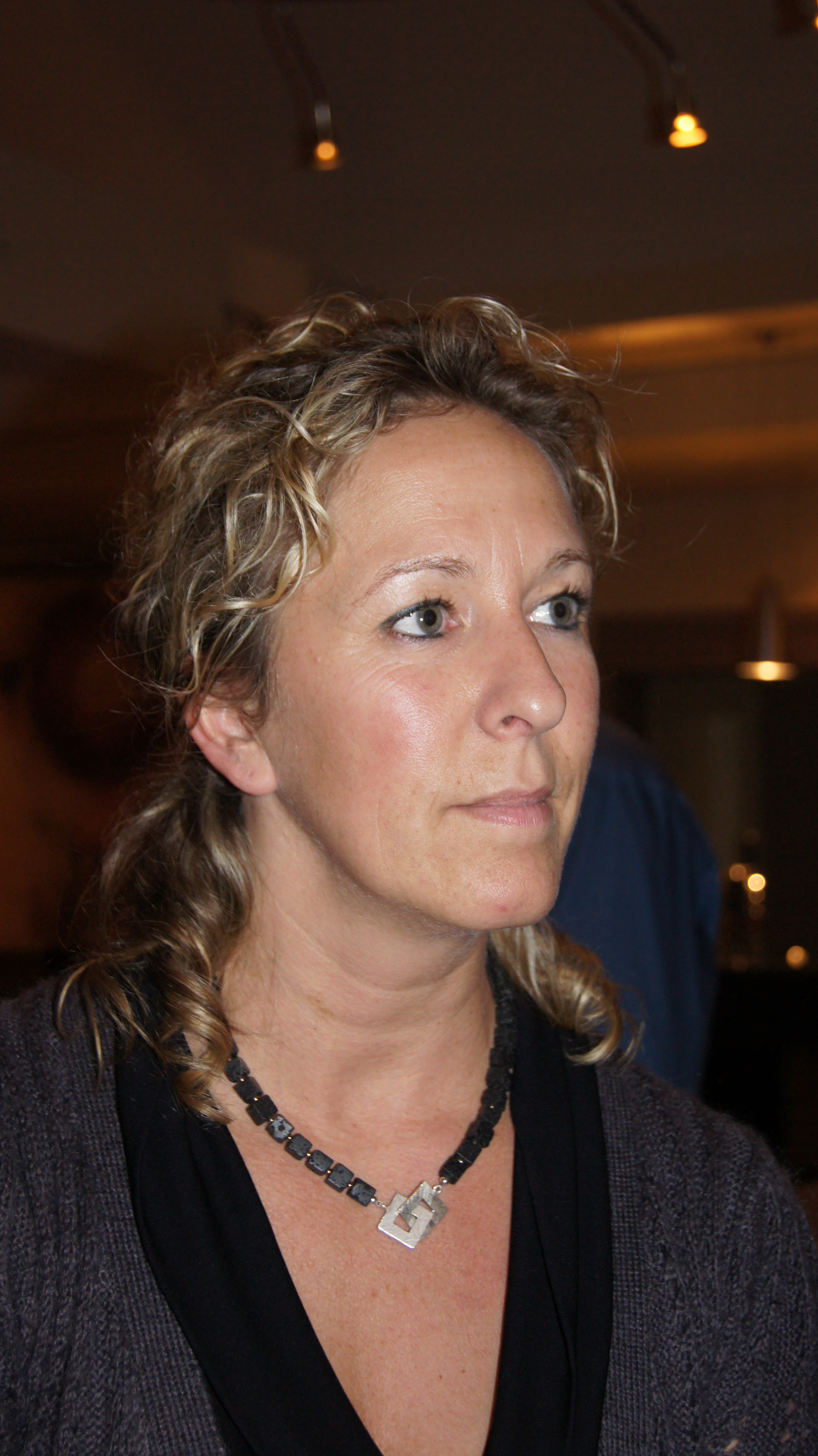

Member of the Chamber of Representatives
- Incumbent
- Assumed office 6 July 2010

Personal details
- Born: 9 March 1970 (age 56) Herk-de-Stad, Limburg
- Party: N-VA
- Website: http://www.n-va.be/cv/karolien-grosemans

Karolien Grosemans (born 9 March 1970 in Herk-de-Stad) is a Belgian politician and is affiliated to the N-VA. She was elected as a member of the Belgian Chamber of Representatives in 2010.
