= Peter Luykx =

Belgian politician

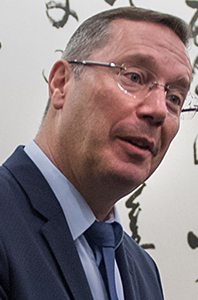
- Luykx in 2017

Member of the Chamber of Representatives
- Incumbent
- Assumed office 2 July 2009

Personal details
- Born: 6 May 1964 (age 61) Neerpelt, Limburg
- Party: N-VA
- Website: http://www.n-va.be/cv/peter-luykx

Peter Luykx (born 6 May 1964 in Neerpelt) is a Belgian politician and is affiliated to the N-VA. He was elected as a member of the Belgian Chamber of Representatives in 2010.
