= Daphné Dumery =

Belgian politician

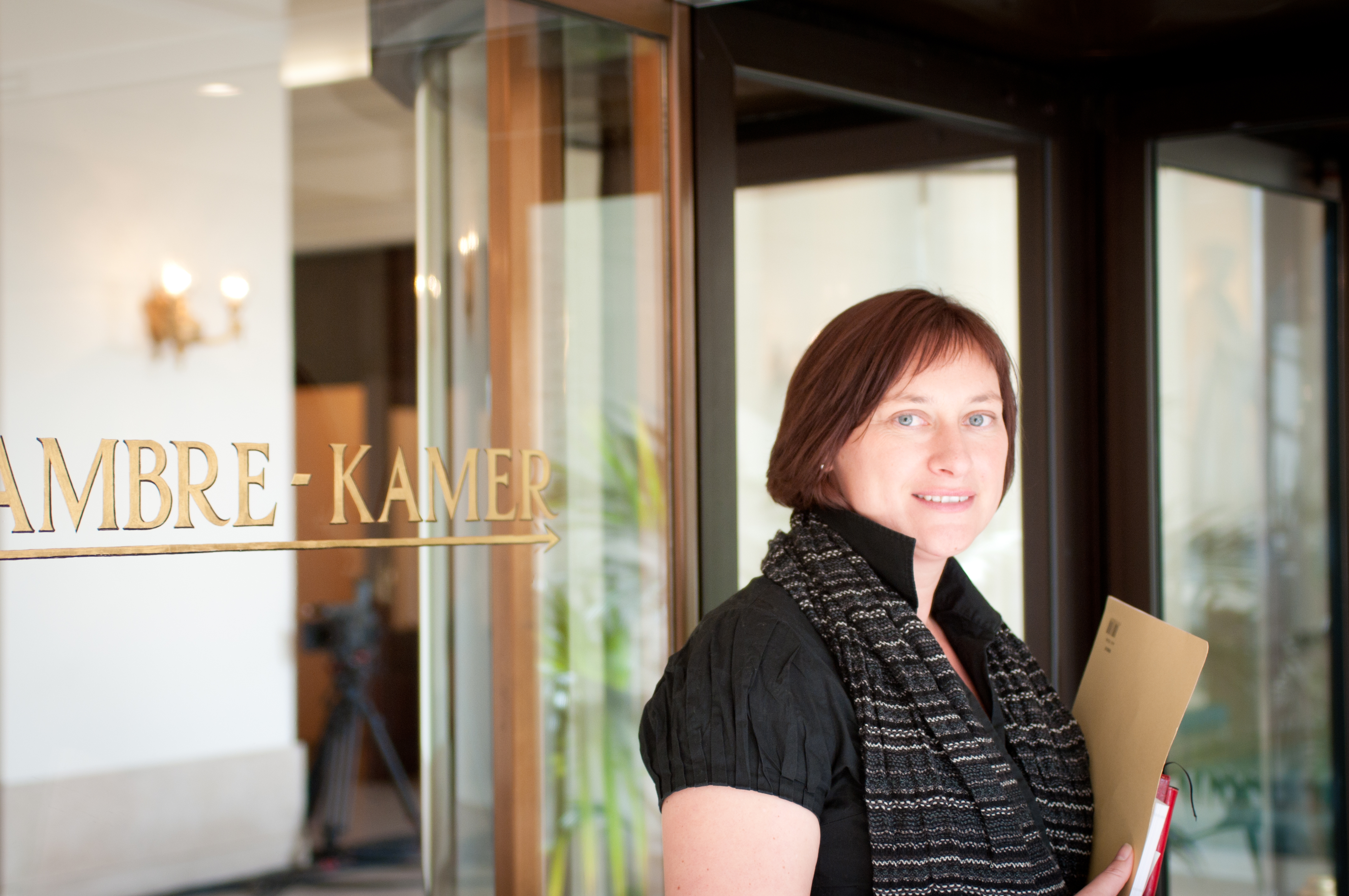

Member of the Chamber of Representatives
- Incumbent
- Assumed office 6 July 2010

Personal details
- Born: 4 January 1974 (age 52) Blankenberge, West Flanders
- Party: N-VA
- Website: http://www.n-va.be/cv/daphne-dumery

Daphné Dumery (born 4 January 1974 in Blankenberge) is a Belgian politician and is affiliated to the N-VA. She was elected as a member of the Belgian Chamber of Representatives in 2010.
