= Sarah Smeyers =

Belgian politician

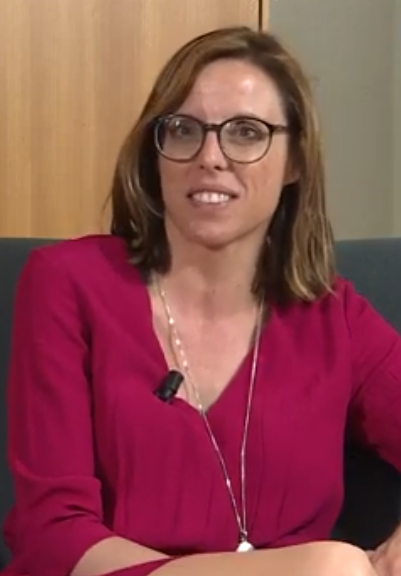
- In a 2019 interview

Member of the Chamber of Representatives
- Incumbent
- Assumed office 28 June 2007

Personal details
- Born: 8 October 1980 (age 45) Aalst, East Flanders
- Party: N-VA
- Website: http://www.n-va.be/cv/sarah-smeyers

Sarah Smeyers (born 8 October 1980 in Aalst, East Flanders) is a Belgian politician as a member of the nationalist conservative party, the N-VA. She currently serves in the Flemish Parliament having previously been a deputy in the Belgian Chamber of Representatives.

== Biography ==
Smeyers completed a doctorate in law at the Catholic University of Leuven followed by a degree in notary law while working part-time in a notary office. She later qualified and practiced as a notary lawyer in Aalst. She first became active in the Jong N-VA in 2001, the youth chapter of the N-VA. She was first elected to the Chamber of Representatives in 2007 and reelected in 2010. She served on the federal budget committee. In 2024, she was elected to the Flemish Parliament.
