= Ann Vanheste =

Belgian politician

Ann Vanheste (born 5 March 1969, in Veurne) is a Belgian politician of the sp.a.

Since 2010 Vanheste has been a member of the Chamber of Representatives. Since 2013 she has also been mayor of De Panne, on behalf of the local list of DAS (De Panne Adinkerke Samen). Her father Willy Vanheste was also mayor of De Panne. She has been widely criticised for her stance on state interference in the stock market.
