= Peter Dedecker =

Belgian politician

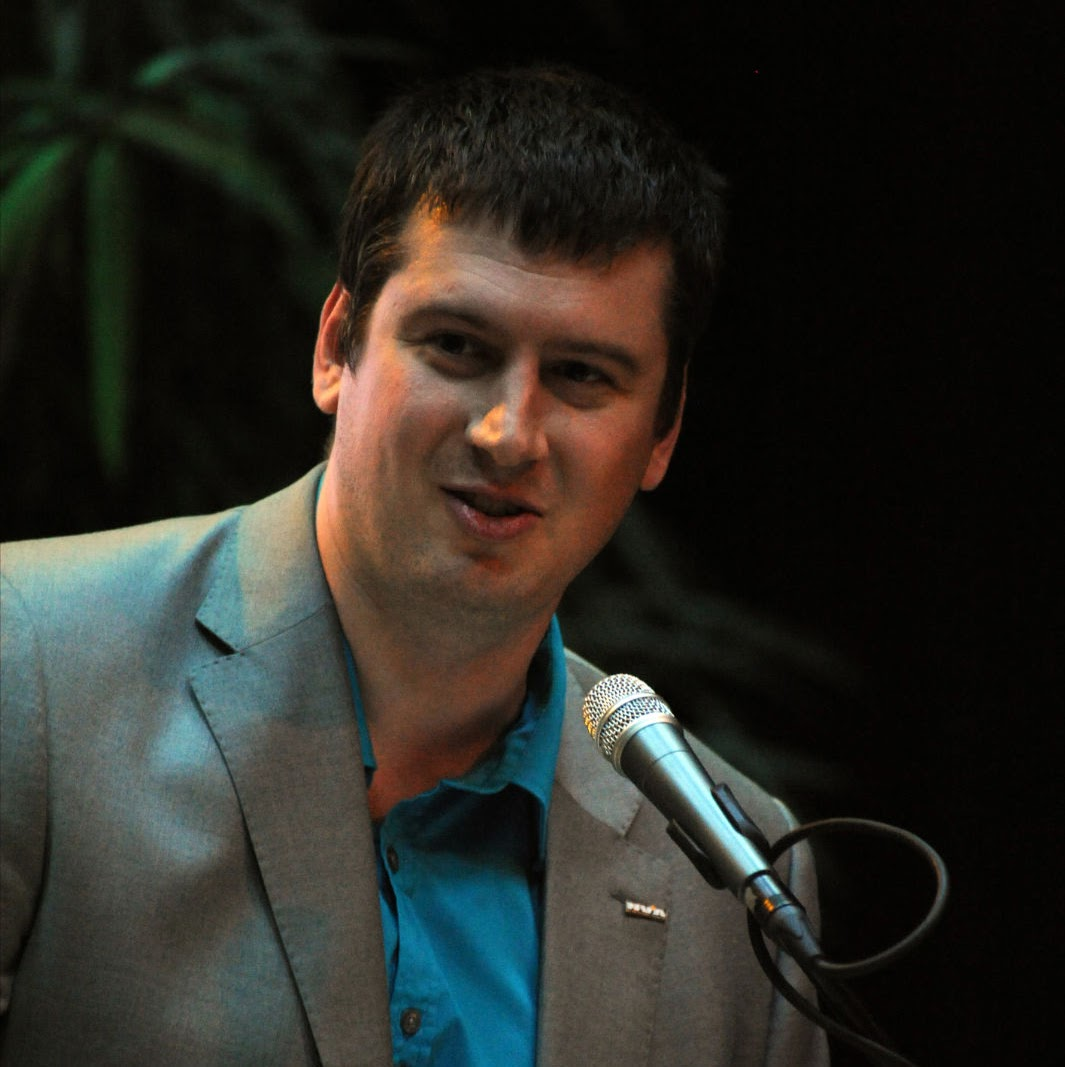

Member of the Chamber of Representatives
- In office 6 July 2010 – 23 May 2019

Personal details
- Born: 7 November 1983 (age 42) Zottegem, East Flanders
- Party: N-VA
- Website: http://www.peterdedecker.eu

Peter Dedecker (born 7 November 1983 in Zottegem) is a former Belgian politician and is affiliated to the N-VA. He was elected as a member of the Belgian Chamber of Representatives in 2010.
