= Françoise Schepmans =

Belgian politician (born 1960)

Member of the Parliament of the French Community
- Incumbent
- Assumed office 18 June 2019

Member of the Parliament of the Brussels-Capital Region
- Incumbent
- Assumed office 26 May 2019

Mayor of Molenbeek-Saint-Jean
- In office 3 December 2013 – 3 December 2018
- Preceded by: Philippe Moureaux
- Succeeded by: Catherine Moureaux

Personal details
- Born: 18 June 1960 (age 66) Berchem-Sainte-Agathe
- Party: Mouvement Réformateur
- Education: Free University of Brussels

Françoise Schepmans (born 18 June 1960, Berchem-Sainte-Agathe) is a Belgian politician for the Mouvement Réformateur, a French-speaking liberal party in Belgium. She has been a member of the Parliament of the Brussels-Capital Region and the Parliament of the French Community since 2019.

She was also Mayor of Molenbeek from 2013 to 2018, and was shortlisted for World Mayor in 2018.

== Honours ==
- Officer of the Order of Leopold (2009)

Political offices
Preceded by Philippe Moureaux	Mayor of Molenbeek-Saint-Jean; 2013–2018	Succeeded by Catherine Moureaux
