= Bert Wollants =

Belgian politician (born 1979)

Member of the Chamber of Representatives
- Incumbent
- Assumed office 6 July 2010

Personal details
- Born: 30 August 1979 (age 46) Lier, Antwerp
- Party: N-VA
- Website: http://www.n-va.be/cv/bert-wollants

Bert Wollants (born 30 August 1979 in Lier) is a Belgian politician and is affiliated to the N-VA. He replaced Kris Van Dijck as a member of the Belgian Chamber of Representatives from 2010 on.

Wollants graduated in 2000 as an environmental coordinator in business management and environmental administration from the Karel de Grote University of Applied Sciences and Arts and started working as an expert in waste management at the Public Waste Agency of Flanders (OVAM). He first joined the N-VA in 2003 and became chairman of the N-VA chapter in Mechelen. In the Federal Parliament, he sits on the committees for energy, environmental protection and nuclear safety.
