= Hans Bonte =

Belgian politician (born 1962)

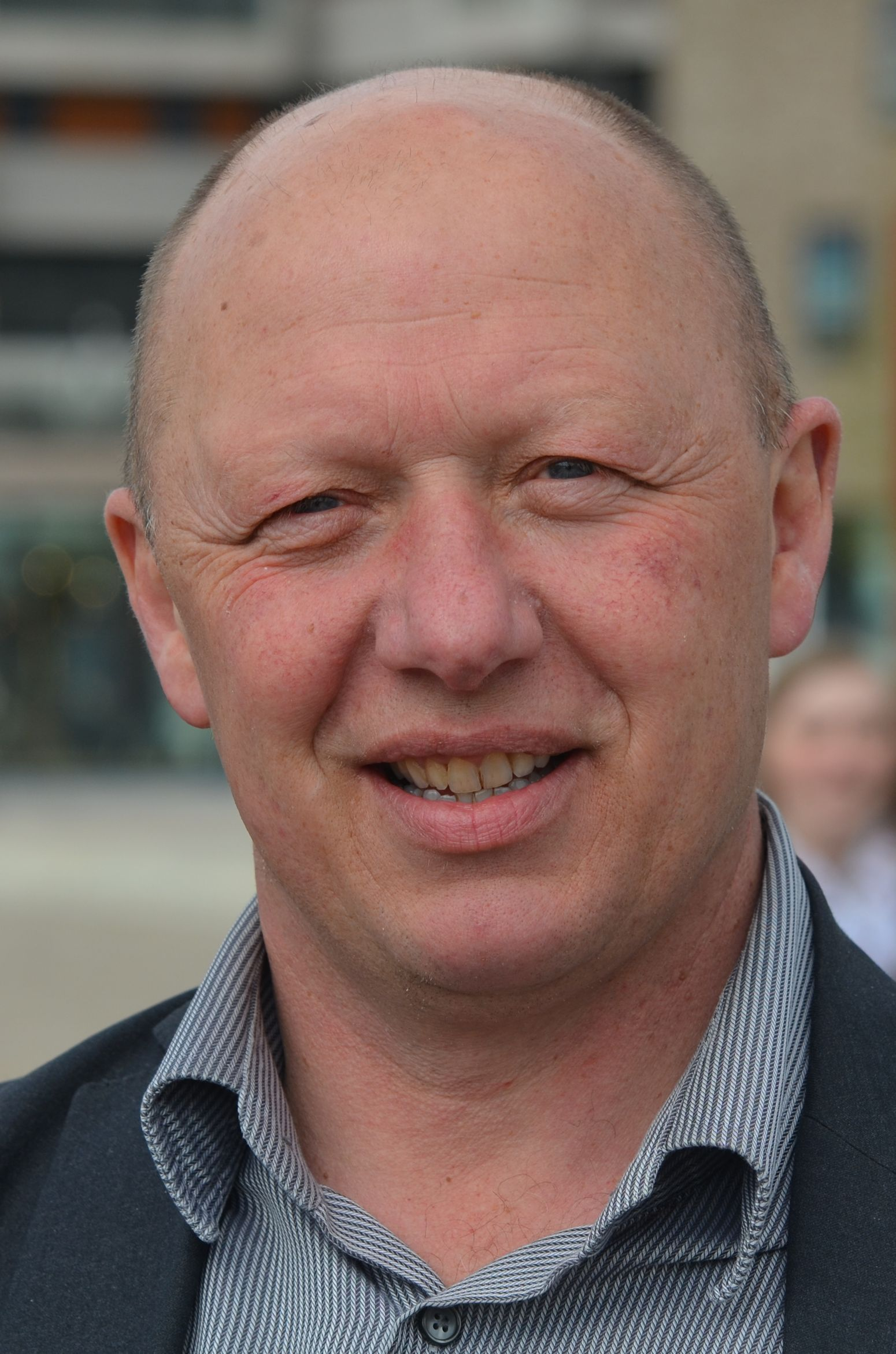
Hans Bonte, 2014

Hans Bonte (born 20 January 1962 in Kortrijk) is a Belgian politician and has been a federal representative since 1995 (for the constituency of Brussels-Halle-Vilvoorde). He is a member of Vooruit (formerly SP.A), the Flemish social-democratic party.

He holds a degree in Sociology and Political Science from the University of Ghent (UGent) and the Free University of Brussels (VUB).

== Career ==
- 1995–2024: Member of the Federal Chamber of Representatives
- 2001–2012: Schepen in Vilvoorde
- 2013–2026: Mayor of Vilvoorde
- 2024-current: Member of the Flemish Parlement

== See also ==
- List of Belgian mayors
