= Catherine Fonck =

Belgian politician and nephrologist

Personal details
- Born: 22 September 1968 (age 58) Ciney, Namur, Belgium
- Party: Centre démocrate humaniste
- Education: Université catholique de Louvain

Catherine Fonck (born 22 September 1968) is a Belgian nephrologist and politician. She is presently a member of the Centre démocrate humaniste (cdH).

== Early life and education ==
Fonck was born in Ciney, located in the province of Namur, within the Wallonia region of Belgium.

She graduated from the Catholic University of Louvain in 1993 with a medical degree.

== Career ==
Specializing in internal medicine and nephrology, she initially worked at the Cliniques Universitaires Saint-Luc in Brussels and later at the St. Elizabeth Maternity and Clinic in Namur.

Fonck married Jacques Doyen. She held the position of Minister for Children, Youth Assistance, and Health in the French Community of Belgium from 2004 to 2009. Additionally, she served as Secretary of State for Environment and Secretary of State for Institutional Reforms in the federal caretaker government in 2014. Presently, she serves as the cdH group leader in the Chamber of Representatives since 13 October 2014.

=== Political career ===
As an elected member of Parliament since June 2003, she has been an active participant in the Committee on Public Health, Environment, and Renewal of Society. Additionally, she served as an alternate member of the Economic Committee and Social Affairs Committee.

From July 2004 to July 2009, she served as the Minister for Children, Youth Assistance, and Health in the French Community. During the federal elections of 10 June 2007, Catherine Fonck's list of the CdH in the House for the Province of Hainaut received 25,685 votes.

She was elected member of Parliament but relinquished her seat to her substitute deputy to continue serving as the Minister for Children, Youth Assistance and Health in the French Community. In June 2009, she topped the CdH list in the regional elections in the district of Mons with a total of 7,986 votes. Catherine Fonck is also the current head of the CdH group in the federal parliament. She assumed the role of Secretary of State for Minister of Energy on 22 July 2014, succeeding Melchior Wathelet, until 13 October 2014.
