= Georges Dallemagne =

Belgian politician and doctor

Senator
- In office 12 July 1999 – 2003

Personal details
- Born: 17 January 1958 (age 68)
- Party: cdH

Georges J.F.M.G. Dallemagne (born 17 January 1958 in Belgian Congo), is a Belgian politician and doctor.

== Biography ==
He was born in Fataki, a small village in the Belgian Congo.

== Career ==
He has a medical degree and has worked Africa and Asia with Doctors Without Borders. He was then CEO of Handicap International.

He was a Belgian federal representative from 20 March 2008 to 6 May 2010 and then from 6 December 2011 (replacing Joëlle Milquet, appointed to the federal government) until May 2013.

He was then Senator (from 13 June 1999 to 18 May 2003 and 12 July 2007 to 20 March 2008), alderman of communal property, sports and public cleanliness (2001–2004) and former local councillor (2001–2004 and December 2006 – March 2007) of the City of Brussels.

He is a member of the Humanist Democratic Centre, former Social Christian Party.

On 16 May 2013, he became federal representative, replacing Myriam Delacroix-Rolin, who resigned, and served until 25 May 2014.

In July 2014, he succeeded Céline Fremault as federal representative after Fremault became Brussels minister.

He co-chairs the Belgium-Taiwan Friendship Group of the Belgian parliament.
