= Kristien Van Vaerenbergh =

Belgian politician (born 1978)

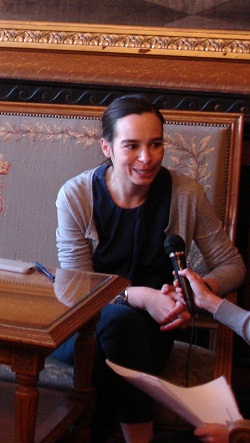
- Kristien Van Vaerenbergh interviewed at the Belgian Federal Parliament

Member of the Chamber of Representatives
- Incumbent
- Assumed office 6 July 2010

Personal details
- Born: 22 April 1978 (age 47) Halle, Flemish Brabant
- Party: N-VA
- Website: http://www.n-va.be/cv/kristien-van-vaerenbergh

Kristien Van Vaerenbergh (born 22 April 1978 in Halle, Flemish Brabant) is a Belgian politician and is affiliated to the N-VA. She was elected as a member of the Belgian Chamber of Representatives in 2010.

In addition to her work in parliament, Van Vaerenbergh has been a member of the Belgian delegation to the Parliamentary Assembly of the Council of Europe (PACE) since 2010. As member of N-VA, she is part of the ECR. She currently serves as member of the Committee on Legal Affairs and Human Rights and the Sub-Committee on Human Rights.
