= Steven Vandeput =

Belgian politician (born 1967)

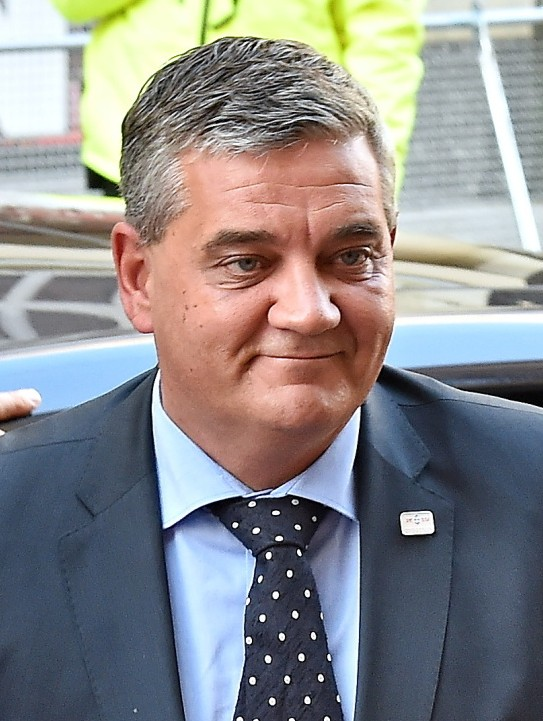
- Vandeput in 2016

President of the New Flemish Alliance
- Acting
- In office 3 February 2025 – 26 April 2025
- Preceded by: Bart De Wever
- Succeeded by: Valerie Van Peel

Minister of Defence
- In office 11 October 2014 – 12 November 2018
- Prime Minister: Charles Michel
- Preceded by: Pieter De Crem
- Succeeded by: Sander Loones

Member of the Chamber of Representatives
- Incumbent
- Assumed office 10 July 2024
- Constituency: Limburg
- In office 12 November 2018 – 26 May 2019
- Constituency: Limburg
- In office 13 June 2010 – 11 October 2014
- Constituency: Limburg

Mayor of Hasselt
- Incumbent
- Assumed office 1 January 2019
- Preceded by: Hilde Claes

Member of the Flemish Parliament
- In office 26 May 2019 – 10 July 2024
- Constituency: Limburg

Personal details
- Born: 30 March 1967 (age 59) Hasselt, Belgium
- Party: New Flemish Alliance
- Other political affiliations: Catholic Flemish Students' Union (formerly)
- Spouse: Saskia Vandeput
- Children: 2
- Education: KU Leuven
- Occupation: Business manager • Politician
- Website: Party website

Steven Vandeput (born 30 March 1967) is a Belgian politician and is affiliated to the New Flemish Alliance. He was elected as a member of the Belgian Chamber of Representatives in 2010.

In October 2014 he became the Minister of Defence in the Michel Government. He was succeeded by Sander Loones on 12 November 2018 after Vandeput became mayor of Hasselt on 1 January 2019.

== Biography ==
=== Early life ===
Vandeput was born in 1967 in Hasselt. He studied history at the Catholic University of Leuven where he was active in the conservative Katholiek Vlaams Hoogstudentenverbond (KVHV) student group and served as the KVHV's president from 1988 to 1989. He then obtained a degree in commercial and financial sciences from the Limburg School of Economics in 1992. After graduating he worked for his family's business before building a career as an independent entrepreneur within the construction sector.

=== Political career ===
Vandeput became politically active for the N-VA and was chairman of the provincial party branch in Limburg from 2008 to 2010. He also became a member of the party board and the party council. During the 2010 Belgian federal election, he was elected to the Chamber of Representatives for the Limburg constituency. In the Chamber, Vandeput became a member of the Finance and Budget committee and the Transport, Infrastructure and Public Enterprises committee. In the Michel I government, he was appointed Minister of Defence and Civil Service in mid-October 2014. He held the role until 2018 when he was replaced by Sander Loones. During his term as minister, a commotion arose in March 2018 about the replacement of the F16 fighter jets, for which a tender procedure was started in 2017. The cause of the commotion was a leaked report from aircraft manufacturer Lockheed Martin which showed that the lifespan of the F-16s could be extended. This information was withheld by figures within the military in order not to jeopardise the replacement of the F-16s. Vandeput also came under fire. In October 2017, it was decided to replace the F-16 with the F-35 Lightning II from Lockheed Martin. This was the first to emerge from a competition with other fighter jets. However, from the start of the procedure it was suspected that the choice would ultimately fall on that aircraft, which made the purchase controversial as did the fact that the Ministry of Defence was once again tying itself to an American company for years to come. Vandeput defended his decision to choose the F-35.

In April 2022, he was elected as one of the two general vice-presidents of N-VA succeeding Lorin Parys.

Vandeput was re-elected during the 2024 Belgian federal election as the N-VA's lead candidate in Limburg. In July 2024, he became chairman of the Finance and Budget Committee in the Belgian Federal Parliament.

== Personal life ==
Vandeput is married and has two children. He has cited sailing as his main hobby outside of politics and is a member of the Flemish Association for Water Sports.

Political offices
Preceded by Pieter De Crem	Minister of Defence; 2014–2018	Succeeded by Sander Loones
