= List of members of the Chamber of Representatives of Belgium, 2007–2010 =

This is a list of members of the Belgian Chamber of Representatives during the 52nd legislature (2007–2010).

== Election results (10 June 2007) ==
Party	Votes	%	+/–	Seats	+/–
CD&V–New Flemish Alliance	1,234,950	18.51	+2.20	30	+8
Mouvement Réformateur	835,073	12.52	+1.12	23	–1
Vlaams Belang	799,844	11.99	+0.40	17	–1
Open Vlaamse Liberalen en Democraten	789,445	11.83	–3.53	18	–7
Parti Socialiste	724,787	10.86	–2.16	20	–5
Socialistische Partij Anders–Spirit	684,390	10.26	–4.65	14	–9
Centre démocrate humaniste	404,077	6.06	+0.59	10	+2
Ecolo	340,378	5.10	+2.04	8	+4
Lijst Dedecker	268,648	4.03	New	5	New
Groen!	265,828	3.98	+1.51	4	+4
National Front	131,385	1.97	–0.01	1	0
Workers' Party of Belgium	56,167	0.84	+0.53	0	0
Rassemblement Wallonie France	26,240	0.39	+0.00	0	0
Committee for Another Policy	20,083	0.30	New	0	New
Communist Party of Belgium	19,329	0.29	+0.19	0	0
Chrétiens démocrates fédéraux	11,961	0.18	–0.40	0	0
Front Nouveau de Belgique	9,010	0.14	+0.04	0	0
Wallon	8,688	0.13	New	0	New
Belgian Union	8,607	0.13	+0.09	0	0
National Force	6,660	0.10	New	0	New
Vivant	5,742	0.09	–0.35	0	0
Parti jeunes musulmans	4,373	0.07	New	0	New
Parti Wallon	3,139	0.05	New	0	New
Vrijheid, Intimiteit, Thuis, Arbeid en Liefde	1,780	0.03	+0.01	0	0
Nieuwe Partij – Fervent Nationaal	1,605	0.02	New	0	New
Vélorution	1,453	0.02	New	0	New
Union pour un mouvement populaire – Belgique	1,408	0.02	New	0	New
MP Éducation	1,362	0.02	New	0	New
Trefle	920	0.01	New	0	New
Front des Bruxellois	901	0.01	New	0	New
Belgique Positif	880	0.01	New	0	New
Unie	856	0.01	New	0	New
Pluralis	757	0.01	New	0	New
Droit et libertés des citoyens	464	0.01	New	0	New
Groupe social des citoyens démocrates	170	0.00	New	0	New
Total	6,671,360	100.00	–	150	0
Valid votes	6,671,360	94.87			
Invalid/blank votes	360,717	5.13			
Total votes	7,032,077	100.00			
Registered voters/turnout	7,720,796	91.08			
Source: IBZ

== Bureau ==
=== Presidents and vice-presidents ===
Office	Representative	Party/Fraction	Office entered	Office left
President	Patrick Dewael	Open VLD	31 December 2008	13 June 2010
First Vice-President	Olivier Chastel	MR		
Second Vice-President	Colette Burgeon	PS		
Vice-President	Herman De Croo	Open VLD		
Vice-President	Filip De Man	VB		
Vice-President	Bart De Wever	CD&V–N-VA		

=== Secretary ===
Representative	Party/Fraction
Corinne De Permentier	MR
Dirk Van der Maelen	SP.A–Spirit
Maggie De Block	Open VLD
Tinne Van der Straeten	Ecolo-Groen!

=== College of Quaestors ===
Quaestor	Party/Fraction
Claude Eerdekens	PS
Luc Goutry	CD&V–N-VA
Olivier Maingain	MR
Rik Daems	Open VLD
Stefaan De Clerck	CD&V/N-VA
Guy D'haeseleer	VB

== Alphabetically ==
Representative	Party/Fraction	Constituency	Language group
Meyrem Almaci	Ecolo-Groen!	Antwerp	Dutch
Gerolf Annemans	Vlaams Belang	Antwerp	Dutch
Josy Arens	CDH	Luxembourg	French
Yolande Avontroodt	Open VLD	Antwerp	Dutch
Daniel Bacquelaine	MR	Liège	French
Sonja Becq	CD&V/N-VA	Brussels-Halle-Vilvoorde	Dutch
François Bellot	MR	Namur	French
Hendrik Bogaert	CD&V/N-VA	West Flanders	Dutch
Hans Bonte	SP.A-Spirit	Brussels-Halle-Vilvoorde	Dutch
Juliette Boulet	Ecolo-Groen!	Hainaut	French
Christian Brotcorne	CDH	Hainaut	French
Koen Bultinck	Vlaams Belang	West Flanders	Dutch
Colette Burgeon	PS	Hainaut	French
Olivier Chastel	MR	Hainaut	French
David Clarinval	MR	Namur	French
Bernard Clerfayt	MR	Brussels-Halle-Vilvoorde	French
Patrick Cocriamont	FN	Hainaut	French
Guy Coëme	PS	Liège	French
Alexandra Colen	Vlaams Belang	Antwerp	Dutch
Philippe Collard	MR	Luxembourg	French
Jean Cornil	PS	Brussels-Halle-Vilvoorde	French
Jean-Luc Crucke	MR	Hainaut	French
Rik Daems	Open VLD	Leuven	Dutch
Maggie De Block	Open VLD	Brussels-Halle-Vilvoorde	Dutch
Rita De Bont	Vlaams Belang	Antwerp	Dutch
Valérie De Bue	MR	Walloon Brabant	French
Stefaan De Clerck	CD&V/N-VA	West Flanders	Dutch
Mathias De Clercq	Open VLD	East Flanders	Dutch
Herman De Croo	Open VLD	East Flanders	Dutch
Jean-Marie Dedecker	LDD	West Flanders	Dutch
François-Xavier de Donnea	MR	Brussels-Halle-Vilvoorde	French
Jean-Marc Delizée	PS	Namur	French
Katia della Faille-de Limburg Stirum	Open VLD	Leuven	Dutch
Martine De Maght	LDD	East Flanders	Dutch
Filip De Man	Vlaams Belang	Brussels-Halle-Vilvoorde	Dutch
Guido De Padt	Open VLD	East Flanders	Dutch
Corinne De Permentier	MR	Brussels-Halle-Vilvoorde	French
Jenne De Potter	CD&V/N-VA	East Flanders	Dutch
Els De Rammelaere	CD&V/N-VA	West Flanders	Dutch
Mia De Schamphelaere	CD&V/N-VA	Antwerp	Dutch
Roel Deseyn	CD&V/N-VA	West Flanders	Dutch
Maya Detiège	SP.A-Spirit	Antwerp	Dutch
Carl Devlies	CD&V/N-VA	Leuven	Dutch
Wouter De Vriendt	Ecolo-Groen!	West Flanders	Dutch
Bart De Wever	CD&V/N-VA	Antwerp	Dutch
Guy D'haeseleer	Vlaams Belang	East Flanders	Dutch
Leen Dierick	CD&V/N-VA	East Flanders	Dutch
Camille Dieu	PS	Hainaut	French
Elio Di Rupo	PS	Hainaut	French
Michel Doomst	CD&V/N-VA	Brussels-Halle-Vilvoorde	Dutch
Dalila Douifi	SP.A-Spirit	West Flanders	Dutch
Daniel Ducarme	MR	Brussels-Halle-Vilvoorde	French
Denis Ducarme	MR	Hainaut	French
Claude Eerdekens	PS	Namur	French
André Flahaut	PS	Walloon Brabant	French
Jean-Jacques Flahaux	MR	Hainaut	French
André Frédéric	PS	Liège	French
Jacqueline Galant	MR	Hainaut	French
David Geerts	SP.A-Spirit	Antwerp	Dutch
Zoé Genot	Ecolo-Groen!	Brussels-Halle-Vilvoorde	French
Joseph George	CDH	Liège	French
Muriel Gerkens	Ecolo-Groen!	Liège	French
Thierry Giet	PS	Liège	French
Georges Gilkinet	Ecolo-Groen!	Namur	French
Luc Goutry	CD&V/N-VA	West Flanders	Dutch
Hagen Goyvaerts	Vlaams Belang	Leuven	Dutch
Olivier Hamal	MR	Liège	French
Philippe Henry	Ecolo-Groen!	Liège	French
Kattrin Jadin	MR	Liège	French
Jan Jambon	CD&V/N-VA	Antwerp	Dutch
Pierre-Yves Jeholet	MR	Liège	French
Gerald Kindermans	CD&V/N-VA	Limburg	Dutch
Meryame Kitir	SP.A-Spirit	Limburg	Dutch
Bart Laeremans	Vlaams Belang	Brussels-Halle-Vilvoorde	Dutch
Sabien Lahaye-Battheu	Open VLD	West Flanders	Dutch
Fouad Lahssaini	Ecolo-Groen!	Brussels-Halle-Vilvoorde	French
Karine Lalieux	PS	Brussels-Halle-Vilvoorde	French
Marie-Claire Lambert	PS	Liège	French
Renaat Landuyt	SP.A-Spirit	West Flanders	Dutch
David Lavaux	CDH	Hainaut	French
Carine Lecomte	MR	Luxembourg	French
Josée Lejeune	MR	Liège	French
Peter Logghe	Vlaams Belang	West Flanders	Dutch
Peter Luykx	CD&V/N-VA	Limburg	Dutch
Olivier Maingain	MR	Brussels-Halle-Vilvoorde	French
Marie-Christine Marghem	MR	Hainaut	French
Alain Mathot	PS	Liège	French
Yvan Mayeur	PS	Brussels-Halle-Vilvoorde	French
Joëlle Milquet	CDH	Brussels-Halle-Vilvoorde	French
Patrick Moriau	PS	Hainaut	French
Jan Mortelmans	Vlaams Belang	Antwerp	Dutch
Linda Musin	PS	Liège	French
Nathalie Muylle	CD&V/N-VA	West Flanders	Dutch
Jean-Marc Nollet	Ecolo-Groen!	Hainaut	French
Clothilde Nyssens	CDH	Brussels-Halle-Vilvoorde	French
Jacques Otlet	MR	Walloon Brabant	French
Sophie Pécriaux	PS	Hainaut	French
Katrien Partyka	CD&V/N-VA	Leuven	Dutch
Barbara Pas	Vlaams Belang	East Flanders	Dutch
Jan Peeters	SP.A-Spirit	Antwerp	Dutch
André Perpète	PS	Luxembourg	French
Maxime Prévot	CDH	Namur	French
Florence Reuter	MR	Brussels-Halle-Vilvoorde	French
Véronique Salvi	CDH	Hainaut	French
Willem-Frederik Schiltz	Open VLD	Antwerp	Dutch
Bert Schoofs	Vlaams Belang	Limburg	Dutch
Katrien Schryvers	CD&V/N-VA	Antwerp	Dutch
Luc Sevenhans	Vlaams Belang	Antwerp	Dutch
Sarah Smeyers	CD&V/N-VA	East Flanders	Dutch
Thérèse Snoy et d'Oppuers	Ecolo-Groen!	Walloon Brabant	French
Bart Somers	Open VLD	Antwerp	Dutch
Bruno Steegen	Open VLD	Limburg	Dutch
Bruno Stevenheydens	Vlaams Belang	East Flanders	Dutch
Raf Terwingen	CD&V/N-VA	Limburg	Dutch
Eric Thiébaut	PS	Hainaut	French
Bruno Tobback	SP.A-Spirit	Leuven	Dutch
Bart Tommelein	Open VLD	West Flanders	Dutch
Bruno Tuybens	SP.A-Spirit	East Flanders	Dutch
Ilse Uyttersprot	CD&V/N-VA	East Flanders	Dutch
Bruno Valkeniers	Vlaams Belang	Antwerp	Dutch
Luc Van Biesen	Open VLD	Brussels-Halle-Vilvoorde	Dutch
Christine Van Broeckhoven	SP.A-Spirit	Antwerp	Dutch
Ludo Van Campenhout	Open VLD	Antwerp	Dutch
Carina Van Cauter	Open VLD	East Flanders	Dutch
Lieve Van Daele	CD&V/N-VA	East Flanders	Dutch
Robert Van de Velde	LDD	Antwerp	Dutch
Jef Van den Bergh	CD&V/N-VA	Antwerp	Dutch
Freya Van den Bossche	SP.A-Spirit	East Flanders	Dutch
Francis Van den Eynde	Vlaams Belang	East Flanders	Dutch
Ludwig Vandenhove	SP.A-Spirit	Limburg	Dutch
Liesbeth Van der Auwera	CD&V/N-VA	Limburg	Dutch
Dirk Van der Maelen	SP.A-Spirit	East Flanders	Dutch
Tinne Van der Straeten	Ecolo-Groen!	Brussels-Halle-Vilvoorde	Dutch
Bruno Van Grootenbrulle	PS	Hainaut	French
Stefaan Van Hecke	Ecolo-Groen!	East Flanders	Dutch
Flor Van Noppen	CD&V/N-VA	Antwerp	Dutch
Vincent Van Quickenborne	Open VLD	West Flanders	Dutch
Herman Van Rompuy	CD&V/N-VA	Brussels-Halle-Vilvoorde	Dutch
Peter Vanvelthoven	SP.A-Spirit	Limburg	Dutch
Hilde Vautmans	Open VLD	Limburg	Dutch
Stefaan Vercamer	CD&V/N-VA	East Flanders	Dutch
Mark Verhaegen	CD&V/N-VA	Antwerp	Dutch
Servais Verherstraeten	CD&V/N-VA	Antwerp	Dutch
Geert Versnick	Open VLD	East Flanders	Dutch
Dirk Vijnck	LDD	Leuven	Dutch
Linda Vissers	Vlaams Belang	Limburg	Dutch
Melchior Wathelet	CDH	Liège	French
Ulla Werbrouck	LDD	West Flanders	Dutch
Brigitte Wiaux	CDH	Walloon Brabant	French
Hilâl Yalçin	CD&V/N-VA	Limburg	Dutch

== By electoral district ==
=== Dutch- and French-speaking electorate ===
==== Brussels-Halle-Vilvoorde (22) ====
Representative	Party
Sonja Becq	CD&V/N-VA
Hans Bonte	SP.A/Spirit
Bernard Clerfayt	MR
Jean Cornil	PS
Maggie De Block	Open VLD
François-Xavier de Donnea	MR
Filip De Man	VB
Corinne De Permentier	MR
Michel Doomst	CD&V/N-VA
Daniel Ducarme	MR
Zoé Genot	Ecolo
Bart Laeremans	VB
Fouad Lahssaini	Ecolo
Karine Lalieux	PS
Olivier Maingain	MR
Yvan Mayeur	PS
Joëlle Milquet	cdH
Clothilde Nyssens	cdH
Florence Reuter	MR
Luc Van Biesen	Open VLD
Tinne Van der Straeten	Groen!
Ben Weyts ← Van Rompuy	CD&V/N-VA

=== Dutch-speaking electorate ===
==== Antwerp (24) ====
Representative	Party
Meyrem Almaci	Groen!
Gerolf Annemans	Vlaams Belang
Yolande Avontroodt	Open VLD
Alexandra Colen	Vlaams Belang
Rita De Bont	Vlaams Belang
Mia De Schamphelaere	CD&V/N-VA
Maya Detiège	SP.A/Spirit
Bart De Wever	CD&V/N-VA
David Geerts	SP.A/Spirit
Jan Jambon (replaced K. Peeters)	CD&V/N-VA
Jan Mortelmans	Vlaams Belang
Jan Peeters	SP.A/Spirit
Willem-Frederik Schiltz	Open VLD
Luc Peetermans (replaced I. Vervotte)	CD&V/N-VA
Luc Sevenhans	Vlaams Belang
Bart Somers	Open VLD
Bruno Valkeniers	Vlaams Belang
Christine Van Broeckhoven	SP.A/Spirit
Ludo Van Campenhout	Open VLD
Robert Van de Velde	LDD
Jef Van den Bergh	CD&V/N-VA
Flor Van Noppen	CD&V/N-VA
Mark Verhaegen	CD&V/N-VA
Servais Verherstraeten	CD&V/N-VA

==== East Flanders (20) ====
Representative	Party
Mathias De Clercq	Open VLD
Herman De Croo	Open VLD
Martine De Maght	LDD
Guido De Padt	Open VLD
Jenne De Potter ← De Crem	CD&V/N-VA
Guy D'haeseleer	VB
Leen Dierick	CD&V/N-VA
Barbara Pas	VB
Sarah Smeyers	CD&V/N-VA
Bruno Stevenheydens	VB
Bruno Tuybens	SP.A/Spirit
Ilse Uyttersprot	CD&V/N-VA
Carina Van Cauter	Open VLD
Lieve Van Daele ← Leyman	CD&V/N-VA
Freya Van den Bossche	SP.A/Spirit
Francis Van den Eynde	VB
Dirk Van der Maelen	SP.A/Spirit
Stefaan Van Hecke	Groen!
Stefaan Vercamer	CD&V/N-VA
Geert Versnick	Open VLD

==== Leuven (7) ====
Representative	Party
Ingrid Claes (replaces C. Devlies)	CD&V/N-VA
Rik Daems	Open VLD
Katia della Faille-de Limburg Stirum	Open VLD
Hagen Goyvaerts	VB
Katrien Partyka	CD&V/N-VA
Bruno Tobback	SP.A/Spirit
Dirk Vijnck	LDD

==== Limburg (12) ====
Representative	Party
Gerald Kindermans	CD&V/N-VA
Meryame Kitir	SP.A/Spirit
Peter Luykx (replaces J. Vandeurzen)	CD&V/N-VA
Bert Schoofs	VB
Bruno Steegen	Open VLD
Raf Terwingen (replaced J. Sauwens)	CD&V/N-VA
Ludwig Vandenhove	SP.A/Spirit
Liesbeth Van der Auwera	CD&V/N-VA
Peter Vanvelthoven	SP.A/Spirit
Hilde Vautmans	Open VLD
Linda Vissers	VB
Hilâl Yalçin (replaced J. Peumans)	CD&V/N-VA

==== West Flanders (16) ====
Representative	Party
Hendrik Bogaert	CD&V/N-VA
Koen Bultinck	Vlaams Belang
Patrick De Groote (replaced S. De Clerck)	CD&V/N-VA
Jean-Marie Dedecker	LDD
Els De Rammelaere	CD&V/N-VA
Roel Deseyn	CD&V/N-VA
Wouter De Vriendt	Groen!
Dalila Douifi	SP.A/Spirit
Luc Goutry	CD&V/N-VA
Sabien Lahaye-Battheu	Open VLD
Renaat Landuyt	SP.A/Spirit
Peter Logghe	Vlaams Belang
Nathalie Muylle	CD&V/N-VA
Bart Tommelein	Open VLD
Vincent Van Quickenborne	Open VLD
Ulla Werbrouck	LDD

=== French-speaking electorate ===
==== Hainaut (19) ====
Representative	Party
Juliette Boulet	Ecolo
Christian Brotcorne	cdH
Colette Burgeon	PS
Olivier Chastel	MR
Patrick Cocriamont	FN
Jean-Luc Crucke	MR
Camille Dieu	PS
Elio Di Rupo	PS
Denis Ducarme	MR
Jean-Jacques Flahaux	MR
Jacqueline Galant	MR
David Lavaux	cdH
Marie-Christine Marghem	MR
Patrick Moriau	PS
Jean-Marc Nollet	Ecolo
Sophie Pécriaux	PS
Véronique Salvi	cdH
Eric Thiébaut	PS
Bruno Van Grootenbrulle	PS

==== Liège (15) ====
Representative	Party
Daniel Bacquelaine	MR
Guy Coëme	PS
André Frédéric	PS
Joseph George	cdH
Muriel Gerkens	Ecolo
Thierry Giet	PS
Olivier Hamal	MR
Philippe Henry	Ecolo
Kattrin Jadin	MR
Pierre-Yves Jeholet	MR
Marie-Claire Lambert	PS
Josée Lejeune	MR
Alain Mathot	PS
Linda Musin	PS
Melchior Wathelet, Jr.	cdH

==== Luxembourg (4) ====
Representative	Party
Josy Arens	cdH
Philippe Collard	MR
Carine Lecomte	MR
André Perpète	PS

==== Namur (6) ====
Representative	Party
François Bellot	MR
David Clarinval	MR
Jean-Marc Delizée	PS
Claude Eerdekens	PS
Georges Gilkinet	Ecolo
Maxime Prévot	cdH

==== Walloon Brabant (5) ====
Representative	Party
Valérie De Bue	MR
André Flahaut	PS
Jacques Otlet	MR
Thérèse Snoy et d'Oppuers	Ecolo
Brigitte Wiaux	cdH

== By party ==
=== Dutch-speaking ===
==== Christian Democratic & Flemish / New Flemish Alliance (30) ====
Representative	Electoral district
Sonja Becq	Brussels-Halle-Vilvoorde
Hendrik Bogaert	West Flanders
Stefaan De Clerck	West Flanders
Jenne De Potter	East Flanders
Els De Rammelaere	West Flanders
Mia De Schamphelaere	Antwerp
Roel Deseyn	West Flanders
Carl Devlies	Leuven
Bart De Wever	Antwerp
Leen Dierick	East Flanders
Michel Doomst	Brussels-Halle-Vilvoorde
Luc Goutry	West Flanders
Jan Jambon	Antwerp
Gerald Kindermans	Limburg
Peter Luykx	Limburg
Nathalie Muylle	West Flanders
Katrien Partyka	Leuven
Katrien Schryvers	Antwerp
Sarah Smeyers	East Flanders
Raf Terwingen	Limburg
Ilse Uyttersprot	East Flanders
Lieve Van Daele	East Flanders
Jef Van den Bergh	Antwerp
Liesbeth Van der Auwera	Limburg
Flor Van Noppen	Antwerp
Herman Van Rompuy	Brussels-Halle-Vilvoorde
Stefaan Vercamer	East Flanders
Mark Verhaegen	Antwerp
Servais Verherstraeten	Antwerp
Hilâl Yalçin	Limburg

==== Flemish Interest (17) ====
Representative	Electoral district
Gerolf Annemans	Antwerp
Koen Bultinck	West Flanders
Alexandra Colen	Antwerp
Rita De Bont	Antwerp
Filip De Man	Brussels-Halle-Vilvoorde
Guy D'haeseleer	East Flanders
Hagen Goyvaerts	Leuven
Bart Laeremans	Brussels-Halle-Vilvoorde
Peter Logghe	West Flanders
Jan Mortelmans	Antwerp
Barbara Pas	East Flanders
Bert Schoofs	Limburg
Luc Sevenhans	Antwerp
Bruno Stevenheydens	East Flanders
Bruno Valkeniers	Antwerp
Francis Van den Eynde	East Flanders
Linda Vissers	Limburg

==== Green! (4) ====
Representative	Electoral district
Meyrem Almaci	Antwerp
Wouter De Vriendt	West Flanders
Tinne Van der Straeten	Brussels-Halle-Vilvoorde
Stefaan Van Hecke	East Flanders

==== List Dedecker (5) ====
Representative	Electoral district
Jean-Marie Dedecker	West Flanders
Martine De Maght	East Flanders
Robert Van de Velde	Antwerp
Dirk Vijnck	Leuven
Ulla Werbrouck	West Flanders

==== Open Flemish Liberals and Democrats (18) ====
Representative	Electoral district
Yolande Avontroodt	Antwerp
Rik Daems	Leuven
Maggie De Block	Brussels-Halle-Vilvoorde
Mathias De Clercq	East Flanders
Herman De Croo	East Flanders
Katia della Faille-de Limburg Stirum	Leuven
Guido De Padt	East Flanders
Sabien Lahaye-Battheu	West Flanders
Willem-Frederik Schiltz	Antwerp
Bart Somers	Antwerp
Bruno Steegen	Limburg
Bart Tommelein	West Flanders
Luc Van Biesen	Brussels-Halle-Vilvoorde
Ludo Van Campenhout	Antwerp
Carina Van Cauter	East Flanders
Vincent Van Quickenborne	West Flanders
Hilde Vautmans	Limburg
Geert Versnick	East Flanders

==== Socialist Party-Different / Spirit (14) ====
Representative	Electoral district
Hans Bonte	Brussels-Halle-Vilvoorde
Maya Detiège	Antwerp
Dalila Douifi	West Flanders
David Geerts	Antwerp
Meryame Kitir	Limburg
Renaat Landuyt	West Flanders
Jan Peeters	Antwerp
Bruno Tobback	Leuven
Bruno Tuybens	East Flanders
Christine Van Broeckhoven	Antwerp
Freya Van den Bossche	East Flanders
Ludwig Vandenhove	Limburg
Dirk Van der Maelen	East Flanders
Peter Vanvelthoven	Limburg

=== French-speaking ===
==== Ecolo (8) ====
Representative	Electoral district
Juliette Boulet	Hainaut
Zoé Genot	Brussels-Halle-Vilvoorde
Muriel Gerkens	Liège
Georges Gilkinet	Namur
Philippe Henry	Liège
Fouad Lahssaini	Brussels-Halle-Vilvoorde
Jean-Marc Nollet	Hainaut
Thérèse Snoy et d'Oppuers	Walloon Brabant

==== Humanist Democratic Centre (10) ====
Representative	Electoral district
Josy Arens	Luxembourg
Christian Brotcorne	Hainaut
Joseph George	Liège
David Lavaux	Hainaut
Joëlle Milquet	Brussels-Halle-Vilvoorde
Clothilde Nyssens	Brussels-Halle-Vilvoorde
Maxime Prévot	Namur
Véronique Salvi	Hainaut
Melchior Wathelet, Jr.	Liège
Brigitte Wiaux	Walloon Brabant

==== National Front (1) ====
Representative	Electoral district
Patrick Cocriamont	Hainaut

==== Reformist Movement (23) ====
Representative	Electoral district
Daniel Bacquelaine	Liège
François Bellot	Namur
Olivier Chastel	Hainaut
David Clarinval	Namur
Bernard Clerfayt	Brussels-Halle-Vilvoorde
Philippe Collard	Luxembourg
Jean-Luc Crucke	Hainaut
Valérie De Bue	Walloon Brabant
François-Xavier de Donnea	Brussels-Halle-Vilvoorde
Corinne De Permentier	Brussels-Halle-Vilvoorde
Daniel Ducarme	Brussels-Halle-Vilvoorde
Denis Ducarme	Hainaut
Jean-Jacques Flahaux	Hainaut
Jacqueline Galant	Hainaut
Olivier Hamal	Liège
Kattrin Jadin	Liège
Pierre-Yves Jeholet	Liège
Carine Lecomte	Luxembourg
Josée Lejeune	Liège
Olivier Maingain	Brussels-Halle-Vilvoorde
Marie-Christine Marghem	Hainaut
Jacques Otlet	Walloon Brabant
Florence Reuter	Brussels-Halle-Vilvoorde

==== Socialist Party (20) ====
Representative	Electoral district
Colette Burgeon	Hainaut
Guy Coëme	Liège
Jean Cornil	Brussels-Halle-Vilvoorde
Jean-Marc Delizée	Namur
Camille Dieu	Hainaut
Elio Di Rupo	Hainaut
Claude Eerdekens	Namur
André Flahaut	Walloon Brabant
André Frédéric	Liège
Thierry Giet	Liège
Karine Lalieux	Brussels-Halle-Vilvoorde
Marie-Claire Lambert	Liège
Alain Mathot	Liège
Yvan Mayeur	Brussels-Halle-Vilvoorde
Patrick Moriau	Hainaut
Linda Musin	Liège
Sophie Pécriaux	Hainaut
André Perpète	Luxembourg
Eric Thiébaut	Hainaut
Bruno Van Grootenbrulle	Hainaut

== Sources ==
- "De kamerleden" (in Dutch). The Belgian Chamber of Representatives. Archived from the original on 2008-11-12.
- "Les députés" (in French). The Belgian Chamber of Representatives. Archived from the original on 2008-11-11.
- "Bureau van de Kamer - College van Quaestoren" (PDF) (in Dutch). The Belgian Chamber of Representatives. 2008-01-17. Archived from the original (PDF) on 2011-06-06.
- "Bureau de la Chambre - College dès Questeurs" (PDF) (in French). The Belgian Chamber of Representatives. 2008-01-17. Archived from the original (PDF) on 2011-06-06.
