= List of members of the Chamber of Representatives of Belgium, 2003–2007 =

This is a list of members of the Belgian Chamber of Representatives during the 51st legislature (2003–2007).

== Election results (18 May 2003) ==
| Party | Votes | % | +/– | Seats | +/– |
|---|---|---|---|---|---|
| Vlaamse Liberalen en Democraten | 1,009,223 | 15.36 | +1.06 | 25 | +2 |
| Socialistische Partij Anders–Spirit | 979,750 | 14.91 | +5.37 | 23 | +9 |
| Christen-Democratisch en Vlaams | 870,749 | 13.25 | –0.84 | 21 | –1 |
| Parti Socialiste | 855,992 | 13.02 | +2.86 | 25 | +6 |
| Vlaams Blok | 767,605 | 11.68 | +1.72 | 18 | +3 |
| Mouvement Réformateur | 748,952 | 11.40 | +1.26 | 24 | +6 |
| Centre démocrate humaniste | 359,660 | 5.47 | –0.40 | 8 | –2 |
| New Flemish Alliance | 201,399 | 3.06 | New | 1 | New |
| Ecolo | 201,118 | 3.06 | –4.29 | 4 | –7 |
| Agalev | 162,205 | 2.47 | –4.52 | 0 | –9 |
| National Front | 130,012 | 1.98 | +0.53 | 1 | 0 |
| Vivant | 81,337 | 1.24 | –0.86 | 0 | 0 |
| Chrétiens démocrates francophones | 38,346 | 0.58 | New | 0 | New |
| Liberal Appeal | 29,868 | 0.45 | New | 0 | New |
| Rassemblement Wallonie France | 25,416 | 0.39 | New | 0 | New |
| Workers' Party of Belgium | 20,825 | 0.32 | –0.18 | 0 | 0 |
| RESIST | 10,059 | 0.15 | New | 0 | New |
| Belgian Union | 10,034 | 0.15 | New | 0 | New |
| Parti citoyenneté et prospérité | 8,258 | 0.13 | New | 0 | New |
| Socialist Movement | 8,116 | 0.12 | New | 0 | New |
| Communist Party of Belgium | 6,759 | 0.10 | –0.27 | 0 | 0 |
| New Belgian Front | 6,736 | 0.10 | –0.26 | 0 | 0 |
| MARIA | 6,440 | 0.10 | New | 0 | New |
| France | 5,668 | 0.09 | –0.03 | 0 | 0 |
| Nation | 4,190 | 0.06 | New | 0 | New |
| VeiligBlauw | 3,237 | 0.05 | New | 0 | New |
| Left Socialist Party | 2,929 | 0.04 | New | 0 | New |
| Communist Party–RDS | 2,522 | 0.04 | New | 0 | New |
| CHOPE | 2,430 | 0.04 | New | 0 | New |
| RDS–Communist Party | 2,084 | 0.03 | New | 0 | New |
| UFE | 1,910 | 0.03 | New | 0 | New |
| OMNIUM | 1,616 | 0.02 | New | 0 | New |
| PDA | 1,415 | 0.02 | New | 0 | New |
| Vrijheid, Intimiteit, Thuis, Arbeid en Liefde | 1,325 | 0.02 | New | 0 | New |
| Noor | 1,141 | 0.02 | +0.00 | 0 | 0 |
| DL | 1,052 | 0.02 | New | 0 | New |
| MDT | 914 | 0.01 | New | 0 | New |
| Parti humaniste–Humanistische Partij | 521 | 0.01 | +0.01 | 0 | 0 |
| PPR | 376 | 0.01 | New | 0 | New |
| Total | 6,572,189 | 100.00 | – | 150 | 0 |
| Valid votes | 6,572,189 | 94.75 | | | |
| Invalid/blank votes | 364,412 | 5.25 | | | |
| Total votes | 6,936,601 | 100.00 | | | |
| Registered voters/turnout | 7,570,637 | 91.63 | | | |
Source: IBZ

== By party ==
=== Dutch-speaking ===
==== Christian Democratic and Flemish (21) ====
| Representative | Electoral district |
|---|---|
| Hendrik Bogaert | |
| Simonne Blondé-Creyf | |
| Dirk Claes | |
| Pieter De Crem | |
| Roel Deseyn | |
| Carl Devlies | |
| Greta D'hondt | |
| Luc Goutry | |
| Theo Kelchtermans | |
| Nahima Lanjri | |
| Nathalie Muylle | |
| Trees Pieters | |
| Katrien Schryvers | |
| Paul Tant | |
| Jef Van den Bergh | |
| Liesbeth Van der Auwera | |
| Jo Vandeurzen | |
| Tony Van Parys | |
| Herman Van Rompuy | |
| Mark Verhaegen | |
| Servais Verherstraeten | |

==== Flemish Interest (18) ====
| Representative | Electoral district |
|---|---|
| Gerolf Annemans | Antwerp |
| Koen Bultinck | West Flanders |
| Nancy Caslo | Antwerp |
| Alexandra Colen | Antwerp |
| Filip De Man | Brussels-Halle-Vilvoorde |
| Ortwin Depoortere (8 July 2004–) replaces Gerda Van Steenberge | East Flanders |
| Guy D'haeseleer | East Flanders |
| Marleen Govaerts | Limburg |
| Hagen Goyvaerts | Leuven |
| Bart Laeremans | Brussels-Halle-Vilvoorde |
| Jan Mortelmans | Antwerp |
| Staf Neel | Antwerp |
| Bert Schoofs | Limburg |
| Luc Sevenhans replaces Filip Dewinter | Antwerp |
| Guido Tastenhoye | Antwerp |
| Jaak Van den Broeck | East Flanders |
| Francis Van den Eynde | East Flanders |
| Frieda Van Themsche replaces Frank Vanhecke | West Flanders |

==== Flemish Liberals and Democrats (25) ====
| Representative | Electoral district |
|---|---|
| Filip Anthuenis | |
| Yolande Avontroodt | |
| Alfons Borginon | |
| Miguel Chevalier | |
| Willy Cortois | |
| Rik Daems | |
| Maggie De Block | |
| Herman De Croo | |
| Guido De Padt | |
| Hilde Dierickx | |
| Stef Goris | |
| Guy Hove | |
| Sabien Lahaye-Battheu | |
| Pierre Lano | |
| Georges Lenssen | |
| Claude Marinower | |
| Ingrid Meeus | |
| Jacques Germeaux | |
| Martine Taelman | |
| Bart Tommelein | |
| Annemie Turtelboom | |
| Luk Van Biesen | |
| Ludo Van Campenhout | |
| Hilde Vautmans | |
| Geert Versnick | |

==== New Flemish Alliance (1) ====
| Representative | Electoral district |
|---|---|
| Patrick De Groote ← Bourgeois | West Flanders |

==== Socialist Party–Different / Spirit (23) ====
| Representative | Electoral district |
|---|---|
| Stijn Bex | |
| Hans Bonte | |
| Dylan Casaer | |
| Cemal Çavdarlı | |
| Hilde Claes | |
| Philippe De Coene | |
| Magda De Meyer | |
| Maya Detiège | |
| Dalila Douifi | |
| David Geerts | |
| Anne-Marie Hiemeliers-Baeke | |
| Karine Jiroflée | |
| Geert Lambert | |
| Patrick Lansens | |
| Walter Muls | |
| Jan Peeters | |
| Annemie Roppe | |
| Annelies Storms | |
| Guy Swennen | |
| Koen T'Sijen | |
| Dirk Van der Maelen | |
| Greet van Gool | |
| Inga Verhaert | |

=== French-speaking ===
==== Ecolo (4) ====
| Representative | Electoral district |
|---|---|
| Zoé Genot replaces Olivier Deleuze | Brussels-Halle-Vilvoorde |
| Muriel Gerkens | Liège |
| Gérard Gobert replaces Jean-Marc Nollet | Hainaut |
| Marie Nagy | Brussels-Halle-Vilvoorde |

==== Humanist Democratic Centre (7) ====
| Representative | Electoral district |
|---|---|
| Joseph Arens | Luxembourg |
| Benoît Drèze (1 July 2004) replaces Louis Smal | Liège |
| David Lavaux (11 January 2007) replaces Jean-Jacques Viseur | Hainaut |
| Joëlle Milquet | Brussels-Halle-Vilvoorde |
| Catherine Fonck replaces Anne-Marie Corbisier-Hagon | Hainaut |
| Melchior Wathelet, Jr. | Liège |
| Brigitte Wiaux (21 July 2004) replaces Raymond Langendries | Walloon Brabant |

==== National Front (1) ====
| Representative | Electoral district |
|---|---|
| Patrick Cocriamont | |

==== Reformist Movement (25) ====
| Representative | Electoral district |
|---|---|
| Daniel Bacquelaine | |
| Anne Barzin | |
| François Bellot | |
| Pierrette Cahay-André | |
| Olivier Chastel | |
| Philippe Collard | |
| Alain Courtois | |
| Valérie De Bue | |
| François-Xavier de Donnea | |
| Robert Denis | |
| Corinne De Permentier | |
| Daniel Ducarme | |
| Denis Ducarme | |
| Richard Fournaux | |
| Jacqueline Galant | |
| Luc Gustin | |
| Hervé Hasquin | |
| Josée Lejeune | |
| Eric Libert | |
| Olivier Maingain | |
| Jean-Pierre Malmendier | |
| Marie-Christine Marghem | |
| Charles Michel | |
| Philippe Monfils | |
| Dominique Tilmans | |

==== Socialist Party (25) ====
| Representative | Electoral district |
|---|---|
| Tabia Belhouari | |
| Mohammed Boukourna | |
| Colette Burgeon | |
| Jacques Chabot | |
| Alisson De Clercq | |
| Jean-Marc Delizée | |
| Valérie Déom | |
| Camille Dieu | |
| André Frédéric | |
| Véronique Ghenne | |
| Thierry Giet | |
| Yvon Harmegnies | |
| Jean-Pol Henry | |
| Karine Lalieux | |
| Marie-Claire Lambert | |
| Jean-Claude Maene | |
| Eric Massin | |
| Alain Mathot | |
| Yvan Mayeur | |
| Patrick Moriau | |
| Sophie Pécriaux | |
| André Perpète | |
| Annick Saudoyer | |
| Bruno Van Grootenbrulle | |
| Danielle Van Lombeek-Jacobs | |
