= List of members of the Chamber of Representatives of Belgium, 1999–2003 =

This is a list of members of the Belgian Chamber of Representatives during the 50th legislature (1 July 1999 – 10 April 2003).

== Election results (13 May 1999) ==
| Party | Votes | % | Seats | +/– |
|---|---|---|---|---|
| Flemish Liberals and Democrats | 888,861 | 14.30 | 23 | +2 |
| Christian People's Party | 875,455 | 14.09 | 22 | –7 |
| Parti Socialiste | 631,653 | 10.16 | 19 | –2 |
| Liberal Reformist Party–Democratic Front of Francophones | 630,219 | 10.14 | 18 | 0 |
| Vlaams Blok | 613,399 | 9.87 | 15 | +4 |
| Socialistische Partij | 593,372 | 9.55 | 14 | –6 |
| Ecolo | 457,281 | 7.36 | 11 | +5 |
| Agalev | 434,449 | 6.99 | 9 | +4 |
| Christian Social Party | 365,318 | 5.88 | 10 | –2 |
| People's Union | 345,576 | 5.56 | 8 | +3 |
| Vivant | 130,701 | 2.10 | 0 | New |
| National Front | 90,401 | 1.45 | 1 | –1 |
| Workers' Party of Belgium | 25,215 | 0.41 | 0 | 0 |
| Communist Party | 23,081 | 0.37 | 0 | 0 |
| Party for a New Politics in Belgium | 22,591 | 0.36 | 0 | New |
| New Belgian Front | 22,491 | 0.36 | 0 | New |
| WALLON | 11,863 | 0.19 | 0 | 0 |
| Aging with Dignity (Flanders) | 8,033 | 0.13 | 0 | 0 |
| FRANCE | 7,493 | 0.12 | 0 | New |
| Alliance | 4,001 | 0.06 | 0 | New |
| PJU–PDB | 2,945 | 0.05 | 0 | 0 |
| Social-Liberal Democrats | 2,623 | 0.04 | 0 | New |
| Social Democrat Party | 1,928 | 0.03 | 0 | New |
| LEEF | 1,703 | 0.03 | 0 | New |
| Employment is Investing in the Future | 1,610 | 0.03 | 0 | 0 |
| Alliance for Truth and Law in Belgium | 1,597 | 0.03 | 0 | New |
| Belgian Indian with No Name | 1,488 | 0.02 | 0 | New |
| Noor | 1,244 | 0.02 | 0 | New |
| Democratic Union | 1,119 | 0.02 | 0 | New |
| For a Movement in Defence of Workers and Youth | 1,068 | 0.02 | 0 | New |
| NP | 943 | 0.02 | 0 | New |
| National Front – Walloon Federation | 859 | 0.01 | 0 | New |
| Front of the Belgian Nation–Party | 671 | 0.01 | 0 | New |
| People's Nationalist Party | 656 | 0.01 | 0 | 0 |
| Stardust | 649 | 0.01 | 0 | New |
| VIC | 636 | 0.01 | 0 | New |
| Democratic Right | 607 | 0.01 | 0 | New |
| Referendum | 601 | 0.01 | 0 | 0 |
| Militant Left | 438 | 0.01 | 0 | New |
| Parti Communautaire National-Européen | 399 | 0.01 | 0 | 0 |
| Humanist Party | 369 | 0.01 | 0 | New |
| Civic List | 242 | 0.00 | 0 | New |
| Paradise Action Party | 105 | 0.00 | 0 | New |
| Other parties | 8,121 | 0.13 | 0 | – |
| Total | 6,214,074 | 100.00 | 150 | 0 |
| Valid votes | 6,214,074 | 93.44 | | |
| Invalid/blank votes | 435,941 | 6.56 | | |
| Total votes | 6,650,015 | 100.00 | | |
| Registered voters/turnout | 7,343,464 | 90.56 | | |
Source: Belgian Elections, Global Elections Database

== By party ==
=== Dutch-speaking ===
==== VB (15) ====
| Representative | Electoral district |
|---|---|
| Gerolf Annemans | Antwerp |
| Roger Bouteca | Kortrijk-Roeselare-Tielt |
| Koen Bultinck | Veurne-Diksmuide-Ypres-Ostend |
| Alexandra Colen | Antwerp |
| Guy D'haeseleer | Aalst-Oudenaarde |
| Filip De Man | Brussels |
| Hagen Goyvaerts | Leuven |
| Bart Laeremans | Brussel-Halle-Vilvoorde |
| Jan Mortelmans | Mechelen-Turnhout |
| Bert Schoofs | Hasselt-Tongeren-Maaseik |
| Luc Sevenhans | Antwerp |
| John Spinnewyn | Turnhout |
| Guido Tastenhoye | |
| Jaak Van den Broeck | |
| Francis Van den Eynde | |

==== SP (14) ====
| Representative | Electoral district |
|---|---|
| Marcel Bartholomeeussen | |
| Hans Bonte | |
| Magda De Meyer ← Willockx | |
| Dalila Douifi ← Landuyt | |
| Fred Erdman | |
| Els Haegeman ← Derycke | |
| Patrick Lansens ← Vande Lanotte | |
| Jan Peeters | |
| Daan Schalck ← Van den Bossche | |
| André Schellens | |
| Dirk Van der Maelen | |
| Ludwig Vandenhove Baldewijns | |
| Peter Vanvelthoven | |
| Henk Verlinde | |

==== AGALEV (9) ====
| Representative | Electoral district |
|---|---|
| Liliane De Cock ← Tavernier | |
| Anne-Mie Descheemaeker | |
| Kristien Grauwels | |
| Leen Laenens ← Boutmans | |
| Simonne Leen | |
| Fauzaya Talhaoui | |
| Peter Vanhoutte | |
| Lode Vanoost | |
| Joos Wauters | |

==== VU (8) ====
| Representative | Electoral district |
|---|---|
| Alfons Borginon | |
| Geert Bourgeois | |
| Frieda Brepoels | |
| Danny Pieters | |
| Annemie Van de Casteele | |
| Karel Van Hoorebeke | |
| Els Van Weert | |
| Ferdy Willems | |
