= 2009 European Parliament election in Belgium =

- 7 June 2009

22 seats to the European Parliament
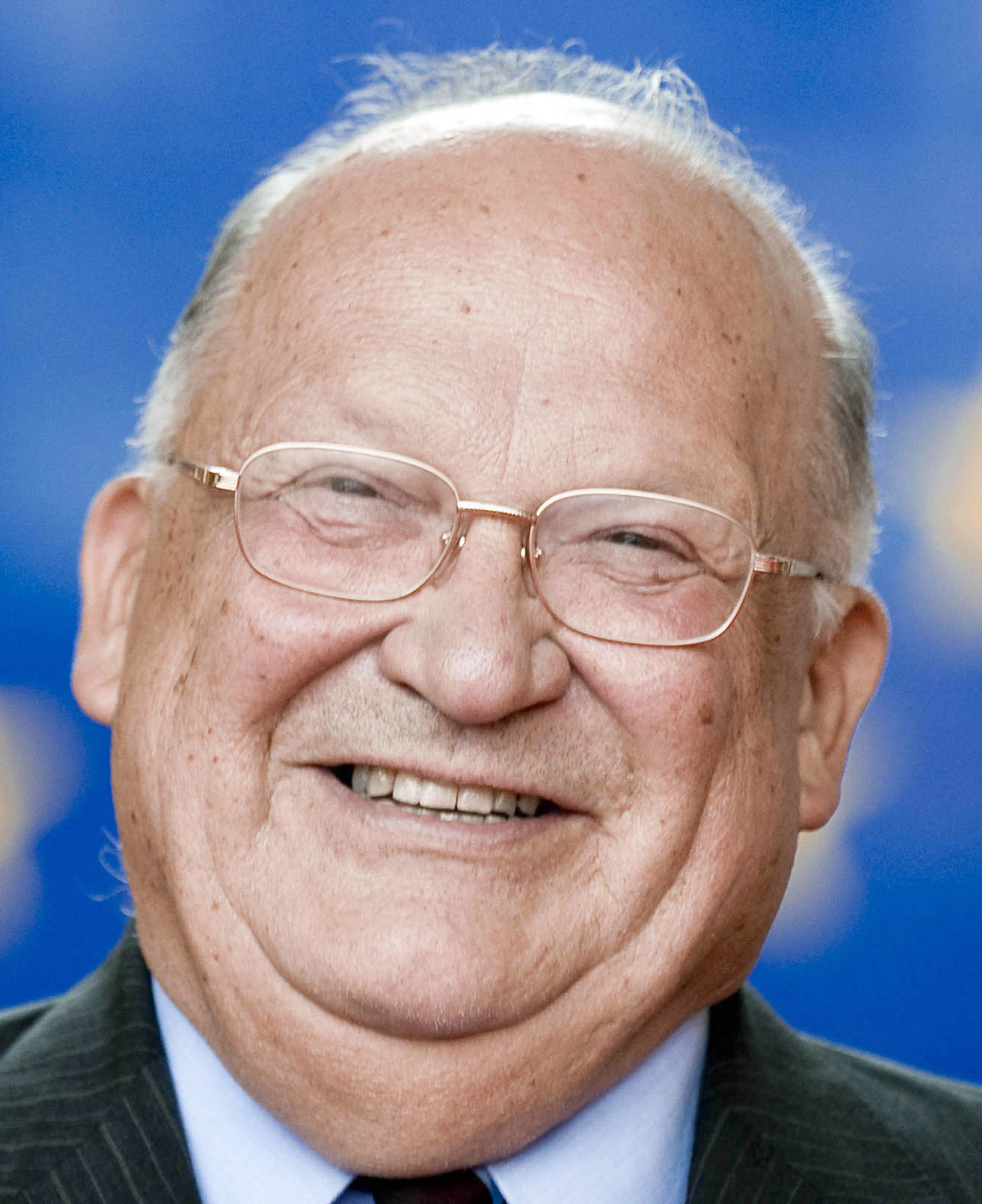

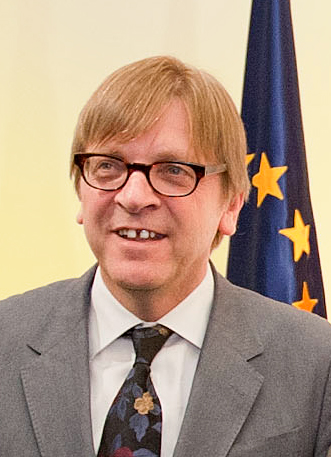

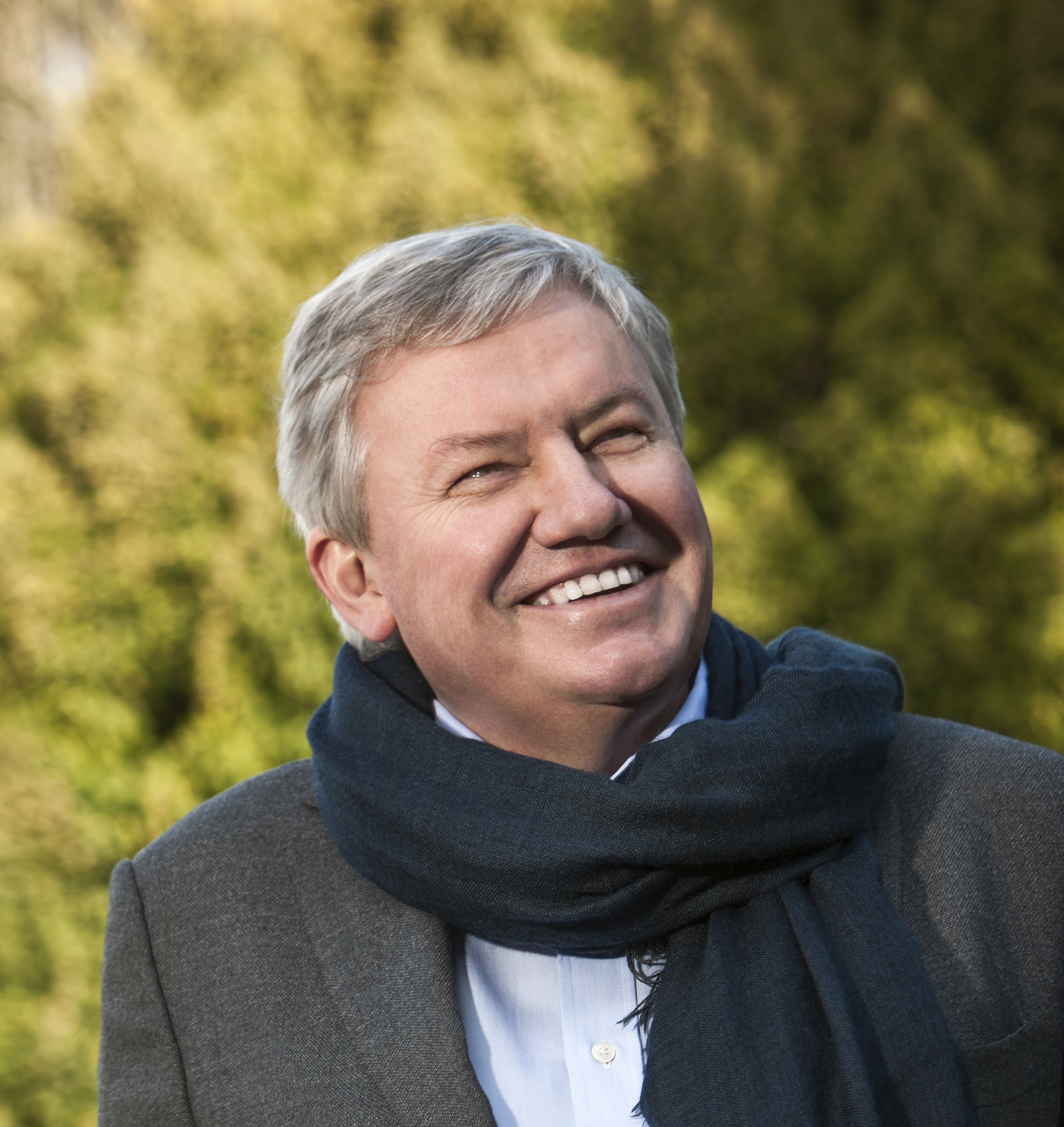

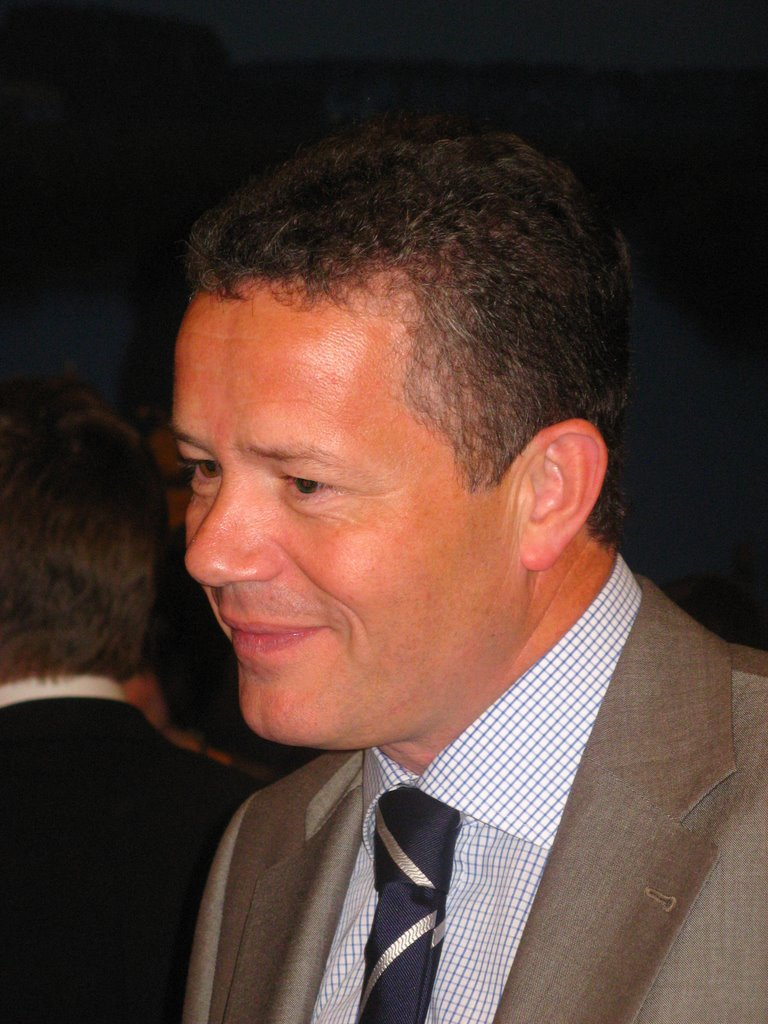

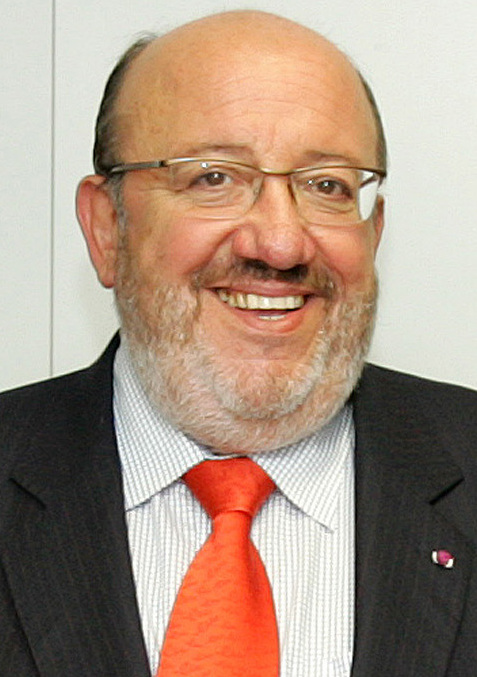
	First party	Second party	Third party
Leader	Jean-Luc Dehaene	Guy Verhofstadt	Jean-Claude Marcourt
Party	CD&V	Open Vld	PS
Alliance	EPP	ALDE	PES
Last election	4 seats, 17.43%	3 seats, 13.56%	4 seats, 13.54%
Seats won	3	3	3
Seat change	▼1	Steady	▼1
Popular vote	948,123	837,884	714,947
Percentage	14.43%	12.75%	10.88%
Swing	▼3.00%	▼0.81%	▼2.66%
	Fourth party	Fifth party
Leader	Frank Vanhecke	Louis Michel
Party	Flemish Interest	MR
Alliance		ALDE
Last election	3 seats, 14.43%	3 seats, 10.35%
Seats won	2	2
Seat change	▼1	▼1
Popular vote	647,170	640,092
Percentage	9.85%	9.74%
Swing	▼4.49%	▼0.61%

An election of the delegation from Belgium to the European Parliament was held on Sunday, 7 June 2009. The elections were on the same day as regional elections to the Flemish Parliament, Walloon Parliament, Brussels Parliament and the Parliament of the German-speaking Community.

As a result of the Treaty of Nice – that became active in November 2004 – the number of Belgian delegates in the European Parliament decreased from 24 (in 2004) to 22 delegates: 13 delegates were elected by the Dutch-speaking Electoral College, 8 delegates by the Francophone Electoral College and 1 by the German-speaking Electoral College.

== Results ==
Party	Votes	%	Seats
French-speaking electoral college
Socialist Party	714,947	29.10	3
Reformist Movement	640,092	26.05	2
Ecolo	562,081	22.88	2
Humanist Democratic Centre	327,824	13.34	1
National Front	87,706	3.57	0
Wallonia First	37,505	1.53	0
Rassemblement Wallonie France	30,488	1.24	0
Workers' Party of Belgium	28,483	1.16	0
Revolutionary Communist League	7,954	0.32	0
Committee for Another Policy–D'Orazio	7,626	0.31	0
Communist Party of Belgium	7,533	0.31	0
Socialist Movement	4,939	0.20	0
Total	2,457,178	100.00	8
Dutch-speaking electoral college
Christian Democratic and Flemish	948,123	23.26	3
Open Flemish Liberals and Democrats	837,884	20.56	3
Vlaams Belang	647,170	15.88	2
Socialist Party Differently	539,393	13.23	2
New Flemish Alliance	402,545	9.88	1
Green!	322,149	7.90	1
List Dedecker	296,699	7.28	1
Workers' Party of Belgium	40,057	0.98	0
Sociaal-Liberale Partij	26,541	0.65	0
Left Socialist Party	8,985	0.22	0
Committee for Another Policy	6,398	0.16	0
Total	4,075,944	100.00	13
German-speaking electoral college
Christian Social Party	12,475	32.25	1
Partei für Freiheit und Fortschritt	7,878	20.37	0
Ecolo	6,025	15.58	0
Socialist Party	5,658	14.63	0
ProDG	3,897	10.07	0
Vivant	2,417	6.25	0
Europe of Values	330	0.85	0
Total	38,680	100.00	1
Valid votes	6,571,802	93.69	
Invalid/blank votes	442,613	6.31	
Total votes	7,014,415	100.00	
Registered voters/turnout	7,760,436	90.39	
Source: Belgian Elections

== Candidates ==
=== Dutch-speaking electoral college ===
Flemish Interest
Place	Name	Party	# of votes
1	Frank Vanhecke	VB	161,371
2	Marijke Dillen	VB	43,974
3	Philip Claeys	VB	27,763
4	Linda Vissers	VB	30,167
5	Francis Van den Eynde	VB	25,598
6	Johan Demol	VB	32,600
7	Alexandra Colen	VB	27,686
8	Gerda Van Steenberge	VB	22,751
9	Bart Laeremans	VB	24,592
10	Bruno Valkeniers	VB	33,322
11	Anke Van dermeersch	VB	41,049
12	Filip Dewinter	VB	150,584
13	Marie-Rose Morel	VB	108,629

Green!
Place	Name	Party	# of votes
1	Bart Staes	GROEN!	97,036
2	Joke Van de Putte	GROEN!	28,556
3	Meyrem Almaci	GROEN!	28,806
4	Hugo van Dienderen	GROEN!	10,049
5	Maarten Tavernier	GROEN!	11,331
6	Rik Jellema	GROEN!	7,442
7	Sara Matthieu	GROEN!	18,248
8	Francine De Prins	GROEN!	12,230
9	Inan Asliyüce	GROEN!	11,763
10	Philippe Avijn	GROEN!	6,870
11	Tom Kestens	GROEN!	9,866
12	Tinne Van der Straeten	GROEN!	19,116
13	Vera Dua	GROEN!	39,725

List Dedecker
Place	Name	Party	# of votes
1	Jean-Marie Dedecker	LDD	149,768
2	Moniek Denhaen	LDD	10,629
3	Derk Jan Eppink	LDD	13,898
4	Kristof Van Der Cruysse	LDD	7,405
5	Isabelle Van Laethem	LDD	9,785

New Flemish Alliance
Place	Name	Party	# of votes
1	Frieda Brepoels	N-VA	67,717
2	Flor Van Noppen	N-VA	27,788
3	Elke Sleurs	N-VA	19,575
4	Louis Ide	N-VA	16,382
5	Hil D'Haese	N-VA	11,585

Socialist Party–Differently
Place	Name	Party	# of votes
1	Kathleen Van Brempt	SP.A	146,992
2	Saïd El Khadraoui	SP.A	50,408
3	Anne Van Lancker	SP.A	47,415
4	Selahattin Kocak	SP.A	33,444
5	Tom Germonpré	SP.A	19,173
6	Tom Balthazar	SP.A	21,864
7	Laila El Abouzi	SP.A	25,694
8	Myriam Vanlerberghe	SP.A	25,683
9	Ludwig Vandenhove	SP.A	22,781
10	Sener Ugurlu	SP.A	23,333
11	Dalila Douifi	SP.A	20,748
12	Christine Van Broeckhoven	SP.A	28,490
13	Bert Anciaux	SP.A	71,919

== Linguistic controversy ==
=== Brussels-Halle-Vilvoorde constituency ===
Generally in Belgium, residents of Flanders can only vote for a party list that runs in Flanders, and in Wallonia residents may only pick a Walloon list. In practice this means residents will only be able to vote for a party representing the official language group of the region. (French-speakers in Flanders have, however, joined up in the cross-party Union des Francophones with one seat in the Flemish Parliament).

In the capital Brussels, which is officially bilingual, people can choose either a French- or a Dutch-speaking party list. However, the area surrounding Brussels is part of Dutch-speaking Flanders, but is joined with the Brussels constituency in elections for the European Parliament and the Belgian Parliament. This bilingual constituency, Brussels-Halle-Vilvoorde, has been declared unconstitutional and has been a source of controversy for years. Flemings fear the bilingual constituency leads to increased francisation of the Dutch-speaking area surrounding Brussels, while French-speakers claim it is their basic right to vote for a French-speaking party. Some Dutch-speaking municipalities decided to boycott the EU Parliament election for reason of the unconstitutionality, but elections were carried out anyway.

As in previous elections, Francophone parties campaigned outside of the Francophone area, leading to measures from Flemish authorities. Affligem and Halle are located in Dutch-speaking Flanders (although a substantial minority of Francophones also live there) but belong to the Brussels-Halle-Vilvoorde constituency. Politicians in Affligem and Halle have objected to French-speaking campaigners in Flanders, and billboard space has been denied by the municipal authorities. In Affligem, French-language posters that had already been put up were covered with white paper. The Francophone party Humanist Democratic Centre has condemned it as an attack on "the fundamental rights of French speakers on the periphery [of Brussels]".

The municipalities of Merchtem, Beersel, Kapelle-op-den-Bos, Machelen, Ternat, Meise, and Grimbergen also said that they would not provide billboard space, in the hope of avoiding French-language posters. In Steenokkerzeel, Ternat, and Grimbergen stickers were distributed, to be placed on mailboxes, requesting that only Dutch flyers are accepted.
