= List of members of the federal parliament of Belgium, 2007–2010 =

For members of the Federal Parliament of Belgium (2007–2010), see:

- List of members of the Chamber of Representatives of Belgium, 2007–2010
- List of members of the Senate of Belgium, 2007–2010
