= Jan Peeters =

Jan Peeters may refer to:

- Jan Peeters (politician) (born 1963), Flemish politician
- Jan Peeters I (1624–1677), Flemish Baroque painter
