= List of members of the Federal Parliament of Belgium, 1999–2003 =

For members of the Belgian Federal Parliament (1999–2003), see:

- List of members of the Chamber of Representatives of Belgium, 1999–2003
- List of members of the Senate of Belgium, 1999–2003
