= List of members of the Federal Parliament of Belgium, 2003–2007 =

For members of the Belgian Federal Parliament (2003–2007), see:

- List of members of the Chamber of Representatives of Belgium, 2003–2007
- List of members of the Senate of Belgium, 2003–2007
