= Fons Borginon =

Belgian politician and lawyer

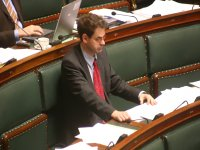
- Fons Borginon in 2005
- Born: Alfons Borginon; 12 July 1966 (age 59); Lier, Belgium
- Occupations: politician, lawyer

Alfons "Fons" Borginon (born 12 July 1966) is a Belgian lawyer and politician for Anders (formerly Open Flemish Liberals and Democrats, Dutch: Open Vld) who served as a member of the Belgian Chamber of Representatives between 1995 and 2007. Borginon was the chairman of the Volksunie and its successor Open Vld, floor leader from 2006 until the general election of 2007. He was also granted knighthood in the Belgian Order of Leopold. He is married to Kristin Ex and father of Hendrik, Irene and Margreet.

== Early life and education ==
He is the grandson of the Flemish-nationalist politician Hendrik Borginon. He was awarded a master of laws degree by the University of Leuven, Belgium, as well as a master of legal studies in comparative and European law by the University of Florence, Italy. While at the UIA for his undergraduate studies, he was a member and later praeses of the Katholiek Vlaams Hoogstudentenverbond (KVHV) of Antwerp, a Flemish nationalist students association. He also became the chief editor of Tegenstroom ("Upstream"). After his university years, Borginon became a teaching assistant at the Antwerp University law faculty and a lawyer at the Antwerp bar.

== Political career ==
He joined the flamingant party Volksunie in 1991, and was elected to the Belgian Chamber of Representatives in 1995. In 1996, he became a member of the party board. When Geert Bourgeois stepped down in January 2001 as party chair because of the Lambermontakkoord, Borginon became the chairman. A difficult year followed as Borginon tried to keep the party together until the collapse of the Volksunie in 2002.

After the dissolution of the party, he became a member of the left-liberal party Spirit, one of the two successor parties to the Volksunie. Bert Anciaux, one of the leading figures in Spirit, brought that new party into the orbit of the socialist SP.A. This caused an exodus from Spirit where Patrik Vankrunkelsven, Vincent Van Quickenborne, Margriet Hermans and Borginon moved to the liberal VLD in May 2002.

While an MP for the VLD, Borginon was president of the Justice Commission of parliament from 2003 to 2006. At the start of 2006, he took over as VLD floor leader after incumbent Rik Daems was in a scandal involving a relationship with the socialist politician Sophie Pécriaux. In the run-up to the parliamentary elections of 2007, it became clear that Borginon would not be given an electable position on the VLD Antwerp list, so he decided to take the high road and not run.

In 2008 and 2009, he worked for Minister of Foreign Affairs Karel de Gucht as adjunct-Chef de Cabinet and later as Chef de Cabinet for de Gucht's role in the kernkabinet. From 2009 through to 2011, he was Chef de Cabinet for Guy Vanhengel, the Minister of the Budget and Deputy Prime Minister. In the local elections of 2012, he was the Open Vld party leader for the Berchem district council elections.

== Curriculum ==
- 1994–2001 : Member of the VU party board.
- 1995–2007 : Member of the Belgian Chamber of Representatives.
- 2000–2001 : Vice-chairman of the VU party.
- 2000– : Member of the Berchem district council.
- 2001–2002 : Chairman of the VU party.
- 2003–2006 : Chairman of the Parliamentary Policy Committee for justice affairs.
- 2004– : Chairman of the VLD party Berchem chapter.
- 2006–2007 : Floor leader in the Belgian Parliament.
- 2006–2007 : Member of the VLD party board.
- 2007– : Speaker of the Berchem district council.
