= Bettina Geysen =

Belgian politician

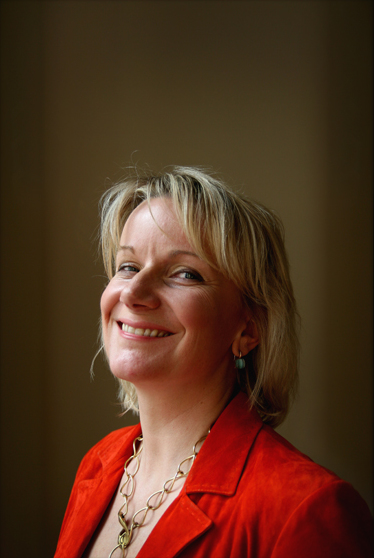
- Born: 17 July 1969 (age 56); Wilrijk
- Occupation: politician

Bettina Geysen (born 17 July 1969) was president of Spirit, a Flemish political party, from October 2007 until 19 November 2008. She succeeded Geert Lambert as president. Previously she worked in the media as a journalist and was director of the één television channel of Flemish public broadcaster VRT. After her political career ended, she founded Youtell, a production company that makes corporate films and personalised TV portraits.

== Sources ==
- "Bettina Geysen voorzitter van spirit". De Morgen (in Dutch). Brussel: Uitgeverij De Morgen nv. 13 October 2007.
- "Bettina Geysen élue présidente de Spirit". La Libre (in French). Bruxelles: La Libre Belgique. 13 October 2007.
