= Bernard Clerfayt =

Belgian politician (born 1961)

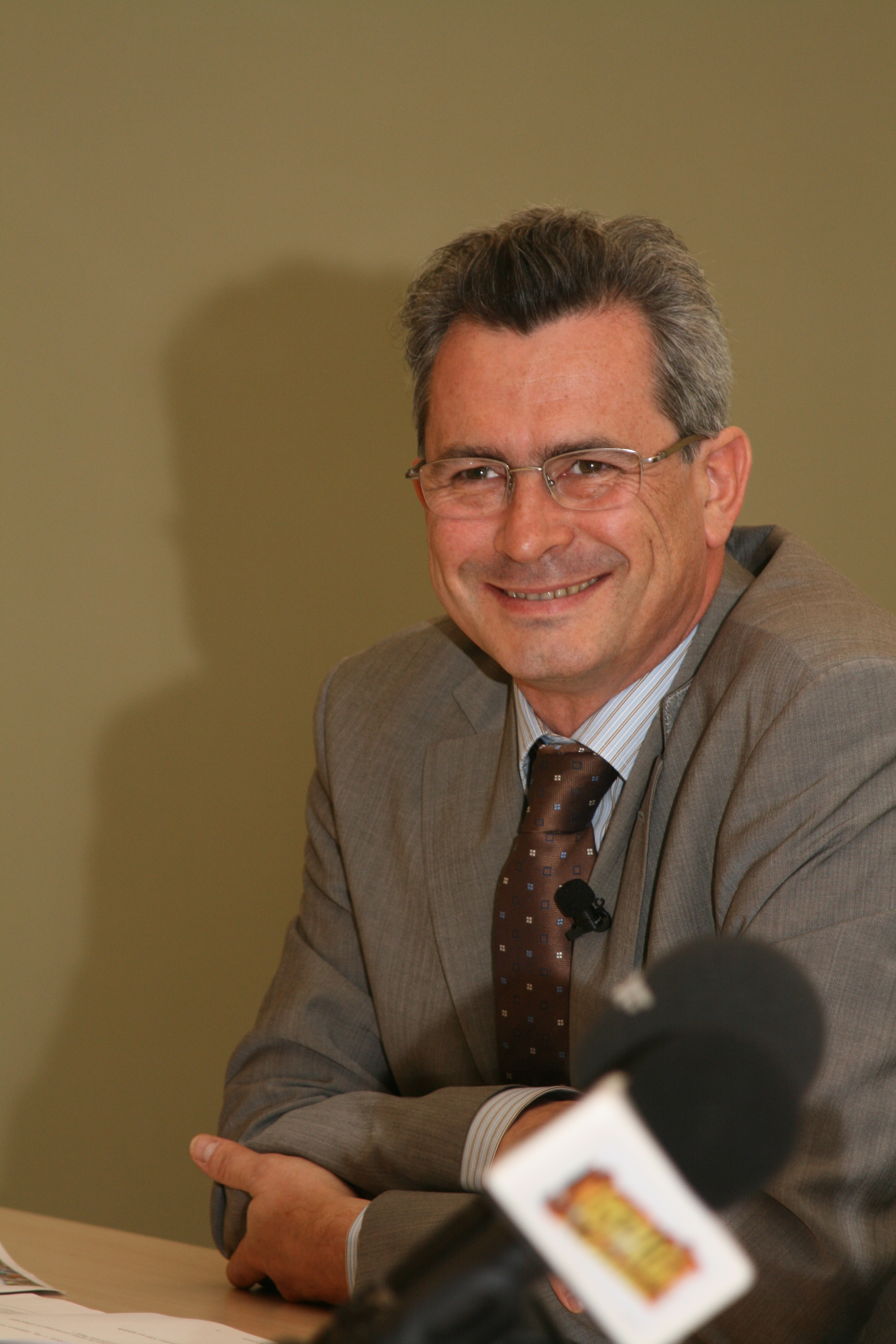
Bernard Clerfayt during a press conference

Bernard Clerfayt (French pronunciation: [bɛʁ.'naʁ klɛʁ.fa.'i]; born 30 December 1961, in Uccle) is a Belgian politician. He has been the mayor of Schaerbeek since 2001 and is currently vice-president of the Front Démocratique des Francophones (FDF). As is common in Belgium, he holds a dual mandate and has also been a member of the federal Belgian Chamber of Representatives since 2007.

Clerfayt received a master's degree in economics from the Université catholique de Louvain (UCLouvain) in 1986 while working as a research assistant at the Katholieke Universiteit Leuven's Centre for Economic Studies (Centrum voor Economische Studien). After an internship at the International Monetary Fund in Washington, D.C., he joined IRES (Economic Analysis Service) at UCLouvain. He pursued his career as a research and teaching assistant. He then obtained the chair of Macroeconomics and Political Economics at UCLouvain, at Facultés universitaires catholiques de Mons and at Facultés Universitaires de Lille (1984-1997).

Bernard Clerfayt joined the local section in Schaerbeek, where he had moved to, in 1985. Ten years later, he became 2nd Deputy Mayor in Schaerbeek and finally mayor in 2001. In June 1989, he was elected to the Brussels Parliament and was reelected in 1995, 1999 and 2004. He has held different posts such as Vice-president of the Brussels Regional Council and President of the Committee for Town and Country Planning and Land Policy. In 2007, Clerfayt was elected to the Belgian Chamber of Representatives and was appointed in 2008 as the Secretary of State for Finance in charge of the modernisation of the Department of Finance, green taxation and the fight against tax fraud. In 2010 he was re-elected to the federal chamber.

Clerfayt was re-elected mayor of Schaerbeek in 2012 at the head of a governing coalition of his own party with Ecolo (green party) and the CdH (Christian-democrats). He had governed with Ecolo since 2006.
