= Bruno Tuybens =

Belgian politician

- Bruno Tuybens campaigning for the 2007 Belgian general elections Picture: Frederik Dewaele

Member of the Belgian Chamber of People's Representatives
- In office 2007–2014

Personal details
- Born: 10 November 1961 (age 64) Uccle
- Party: Socialistische Partij Anders
- Website: http://www.brunotuybens.be

Bruno Tuybens (born 10 November 1961) is a Belgian politician and member of the sp.a.

From 2002 until he became a secretary of state in 2005, Tuybens served as head of the sustainable and ethical investment division of the KBC Bank. In October 2005, Tuybens joined the Belgian federal government as Secretary of State for Public Enterprises, attached to the Minister of Budget, serving until December 2007 when Verhofstadt III took power.

Between 1999 and 2003 Tuybens served as chairman of the Flemish division of Amnesty International. In August 2005 Tuybens was elected to the International Executive Committee of the organization. In the 2006 Belgian municipal elections he led his cartel SAMBA to an electoral victory in his home town Zwalm. Tuybens served as mayor of Zwalm (2007–2013, 2022–2024). In the 2007 Belgian general election, Tuybens was elected to the Belgian Chamber of People's Representatives. He was re-elected in 2010. In 2014, after not being given an electable place by his party for the 2014 general election, Tuybens decided not to stand for re-election.
