= Juliette Boulet =

Belgian politician

Juliette Boulet (French: [ʒyljɛt bulɛ]; born in Namur, 14 January 1981) is a Belgian politician, a member of Ecolo.
