= Rita De Bont =

Belgian politician of the Vlaams Belang

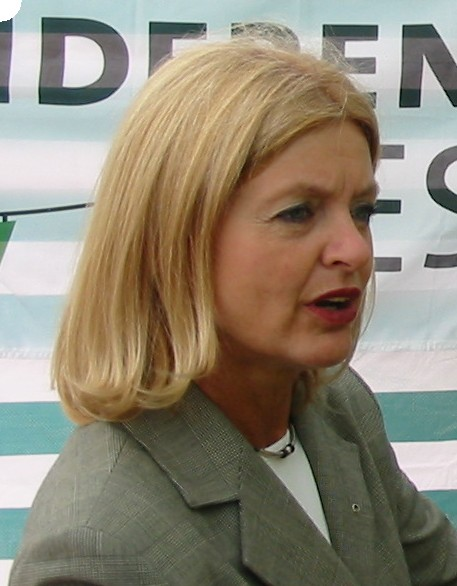
Rita De Bont

Rita De Bont (born 29 July 1954 in Vilvoorde, Belgium) is a Belgian politician of the Vlaams Belang (a party of the far right that advocates Flemish independence). She was a member of the Chamber of Representatives from 2007 to 2014, representing Antwerp.
