= Willem-Frederik Schiltz =

Belgian politician (born 1979)

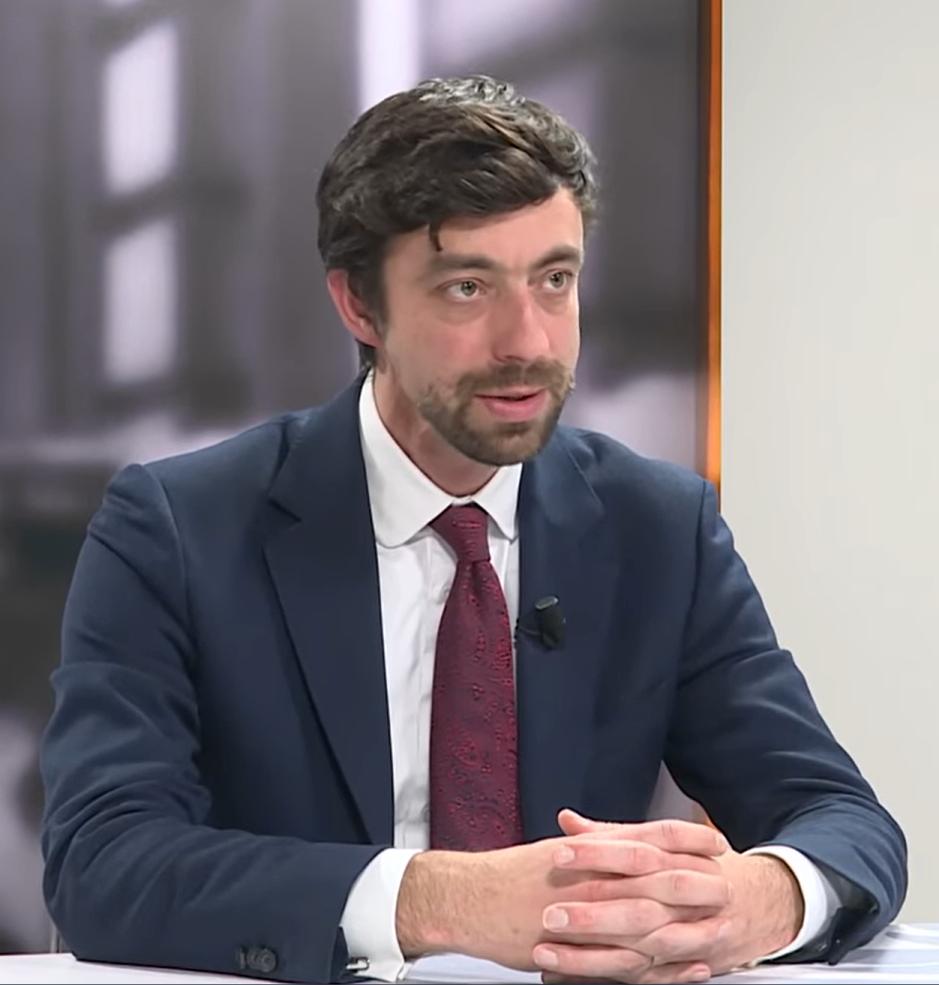

Member of the Flemish Parliament
- Incumbent
- Assumed office 25 May 2014

Senator
- In office 2019–2021

Personal details
- Born: 22 June 1979 (age 46) Wilrijk
- Party: Anders

Willem-Frederik Schiltz (born June 22, 1979) is a Belgian politician for Anders (formerly Open Flemish Liberals and Democrats) serving as a Member of the Flemish Parliament since 2014.

== Biography ==
Schiltz is the son of politician Hugo Schiltz. He studied law at universities in Belgium and London before working for a law firm.

Since 2014, he has served as a member of the Flemish Parliament and between 2019 and 2021 was designated as a Senator. In 2019, he became the floor leader and spokesman for Anders in the Flemish Parliament.
