= Marie-Rose Morel =

Flemish-Belgian politician (1972–2011)

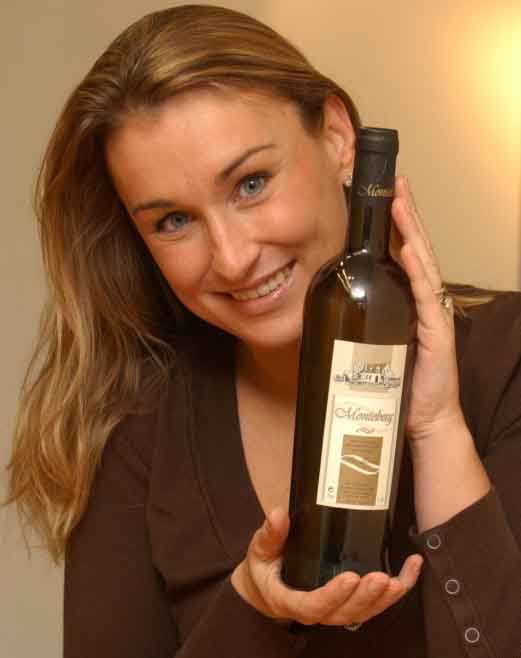
- Morel in 2008
- Born: Marie Rose Louise Constant Morel; 26 August 1972; Antwerp, Belgium
- Died: 8 February 2011 (aged 38); Wilrijk, Belgium
- Occupation: Politician

Marie Rose Louise Constant Morel (26 August 1972 – 8 February 2011) was a Flemish-Belgian politician. She became a member of the Flemish Parliament for the far-right party Vlaams Belang in 2004, after leaving the New-Flemish Alliance. She made a bid for the European Parliament in 2009 but was unsuccessful.

In 1994, Morel was elected Miss Flanders. She was diagnosed with stage IV uterine cancer in 2008. On 8 February 2011, she died from the disease. She was 38.

Preceded by	Miss Flanders; 1994	Succeeded by Véronique De Kock
