= Ilse Uyttersprot =

Belgian politician (1967–2020)

Ilse Uyttersprot (10 May 1967 – 4 August 2020) was a Belgian Christian Democrat politician who served as a CD&V member of the Chamber of Representatives for East Flanders.

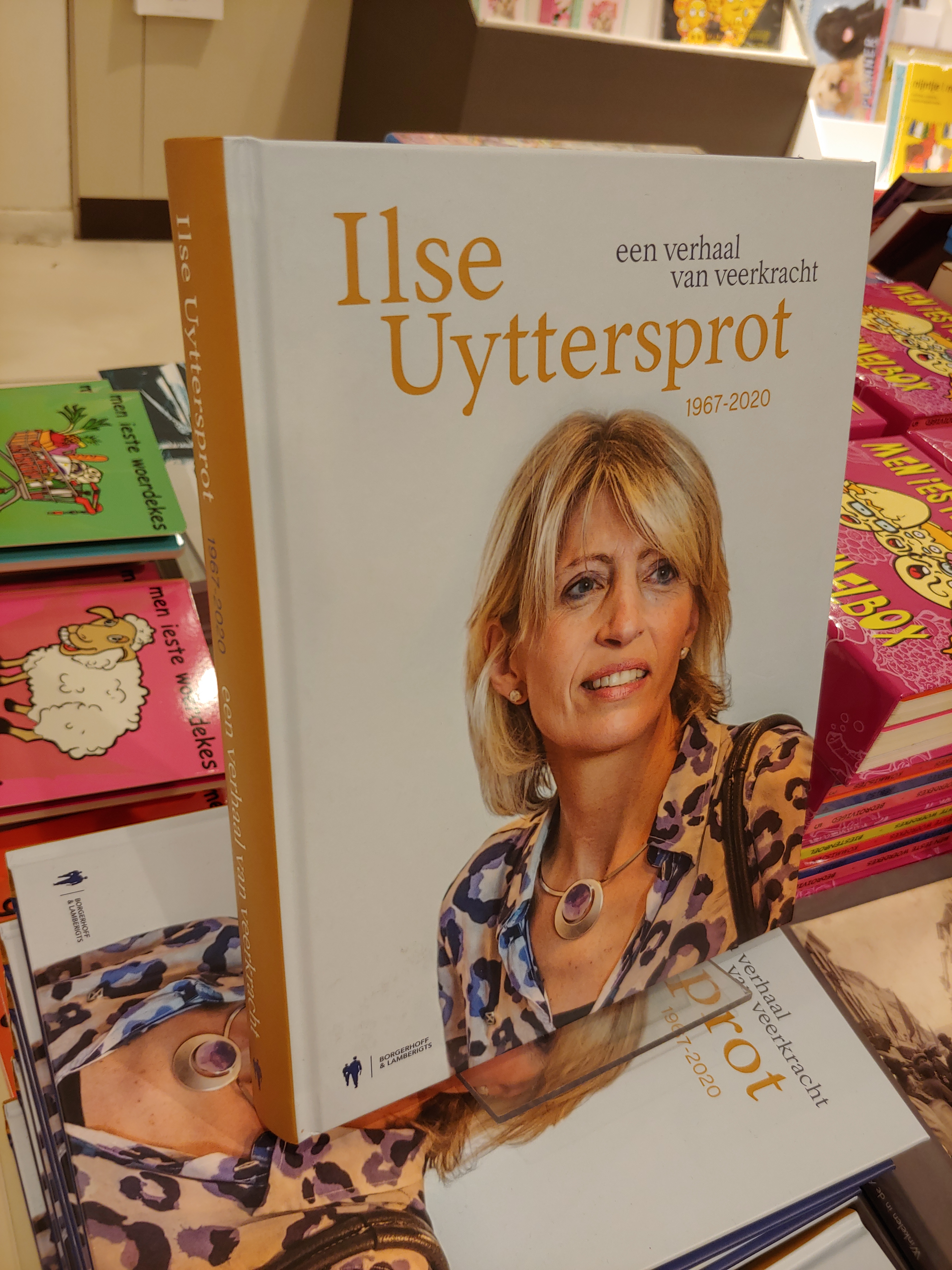
Ilse Uyttersprot on the cover of her biography: "een verhaal van veerkracht" ("a story of resilience").

Born in Dendermonde, she was the daughter of Raymond Uyttersprot, former mayor of Moorsel. She was a Chamber member from 2007 to 2010. From 2007 to 2013, she was mayor of Aalst, Belgium. Afterwards, she became a schepen (alderman) of the city.

== Death ==
Uyttersprot was murdered with a hammer in August 2020, aged 53; her boyfriend turned himself in to the police and admitted the crime, after which her body was discovered in an apartment in Aalst. She is survived by two children.
