= Florence Reuter =

Belgian politician (born 1969)

Florence A. Reuter (born 20 December 1969) is a Belgian Reformist politician who is currently the Mayor of Waterloo. She was elected to the Belgian Federal Parliament in the 2024 election.

== Political career ==
The 6 March 2015, she was sworn in and became mayor of Waterloo, following the resignation of Serge Kubla and his indictment for corruption.

Reuter was the lead candidate for Walloon Brabant in the 2024 Belgian federal election.
