= Geert Lambert =

Belgian politician (born 1967)

Senator
- In office 28 June 2007 – June 2011

Personal details
- Born: 28 February 1967 (age 59) Ostend
- Party: Social Liberal Party
- Occupation: politician, lawyer
- Website: www.geertlambert.be

Geert Lambert (born 28 February 1967) is a Belgian politician and lawyer. He was the president of Spirit, a Flemish political party, from 2004 until 2007, when he was succeeded by Bettina Geysen. In 2003 he became a member of the Chamber of Representatives, where he headed the Spirit fraction, and following the 2007 Belgian federal election held on 10 June 2007, he became a directly elected member of the Belgian Senate.
