= Peter Logghe =

Member of the Chamber of Representatives
- In office 10 June 2007 – 25 May 2014

Personal details
- Born: 20 March 1959 (age 67) Torhout, Belgium
- Party: Vlaams Blok (1993–2004); Vlaams Belang (2004–present)

Peter Logghe (born 20 March 1959) is a Belgian politician of the Vlaams Belang party.

== Biography ==
Logghe holds a financial law degree from the University of Ghent. He worked as a legal advisor to the KBC Group before becoming the editor of the conservative political magazine TeKoS. As a student, Logghe was a board member of the student nationalist Nationalistische Studentenvereniging movement.

He was initially a member of the short-lived Flemish People's Party (VVP) founded by Lode Claes before becoming a member of Vlaams Blok which succeeded the VVP. He then became a member of the Blok's successor Vlaams Belang in 2004 and was secretary of the party in Roeselare. In the 2007 Belgian federal election Logghe became a member of the Chamber of Representatives for the West Flanders constituency. He was re-elected in 2007 and 2010, but lost his seat in the 2014 election when the Vlaams Belang suffered a major defeat. He is a municipal councilor for the Vlaams Belang in Roeselare.
