= Flor Van Noppen =

Belgian politician

Member of the Chamber of Representatives
- In office 28 June 2007 – 25 May 2014

Personal details
- Born: Florentinus Ludovicus Leopoldus Eduard Van Noppen; 28 June 1956 Turnhout, Antwerp
- Died: 22 September 2014 (aged 58) Dessel, Antwerp, Belgium
- Party: N-VA
- Website: Official website

Florentinus Ludovicus Leopoldus Eduard ("Flor") Van Noppen (28 June 1956 – 22 September 2014) was a Belgian politician who was affiliated with the N-VA.

Van Noppen was the brother of veterinarian Karel Van Noppen, who was the victim in a high-profile murder case. He was elected as a member of the Belgian Chamber of Representatives in 2007 and reelected in 2010. He served as city councilor (2001-2014) and alderman (2007-13) of Dessel.

== Death ==
Van Noppen, who suffered from Multiple system atrophy, retired from politics after the 2014 elections upon completing his term. He died on 22 September 2014, aged 58.
