= Guido De Padt =

Belgian politician

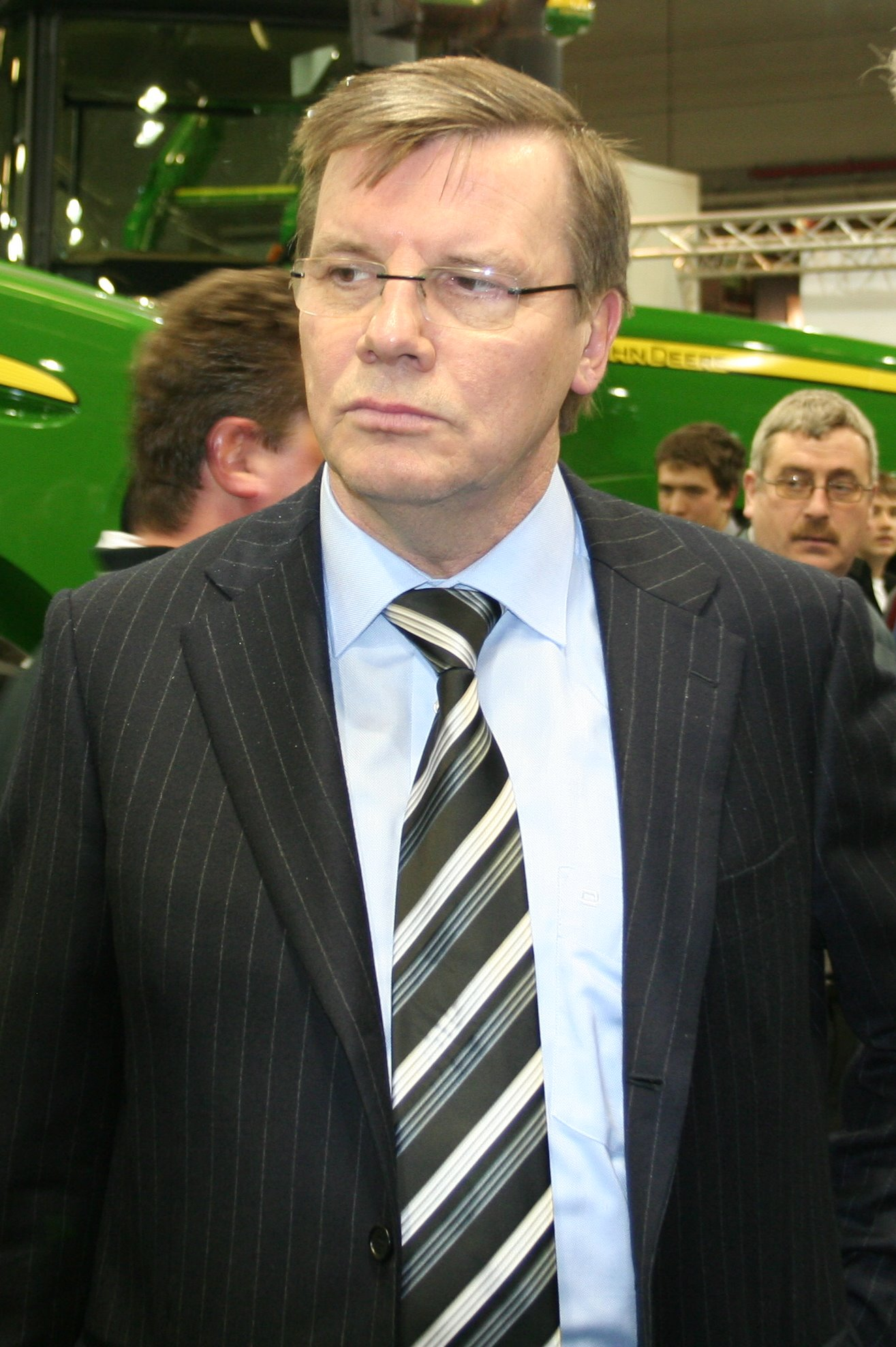
- Guido De Padt in 2009

Member of the Senate
- Incumbent
- Assumed office 20 July 2010

Mayor of Geraardsbergen
- Incumbent
- Assumed office 30 December 2011
- Preceded by: Freddy De Chou
- In office 1 January 2001 – 31 December 2006
- Preceded by: Freddy De Chou
- Succeeded by: Freddy De Chou

Government Commissioner
- In office 17 July 2009 – 20 July 2010
- Prime Minister: Yves Leterme

Minister of the Interior
- In office 30 December 2008 – 17 July 2009
- Prime Minister: Herman Van Rompuy
- Preceded by: Patrick Dewael
- Succeeded by: Annemie Turtelboom

Member of the Chamber of Representatives
- In office 17 May 2003 – 30 December 2008

Personal details
- Born: 23 May 1954 (age 72) Geraardsbergen, Belgium
- Party: Open Flemish Liberals and Democrats

Guido De Padt (born 23 May 1954) is a Belgian politician and Senator for the Open Flemish Liberals and Democrats. Since December 2011, he also is the mayor of Geraardsbergen, an office he also held from 2001 until 2006.

He started his national career as member of the Chamber of Representatives. From December 2008 to July 2009, he was Minister of the Interior in the Van Rompuy I Government. In the Leterme II Government, he was appointed government commissioner for the internal audit of the federal government. In 2011, he replaced the socialist Freddy De Chou as mayor of Geraardsbergen. He got national media attention as strong defender to keep the Muur van Geraardsbergen in the Tour of Flanders. His party won the 2012 local elections in Geraardsbergen with 36% of the votes, while he got 25.8% of the preference votes. In contrast with other liberal leaders in Flanders, his popularity had grown.

Political offices
Preceded by Freddy De Chou	Mayor of Geraardsbergen; 2001–2006	Succeeded by Freddy De Chou
Preceded by Patrick Dewael	Minister of the Interior; 2008–2009	Succeeded by Annemie Turtelboom
Preceded by Freddy De Chou	Mayor of Geraardsbergen; 2011–present	Incumbent
