= Valérie De Bue =

Belgian politician (born 1966)

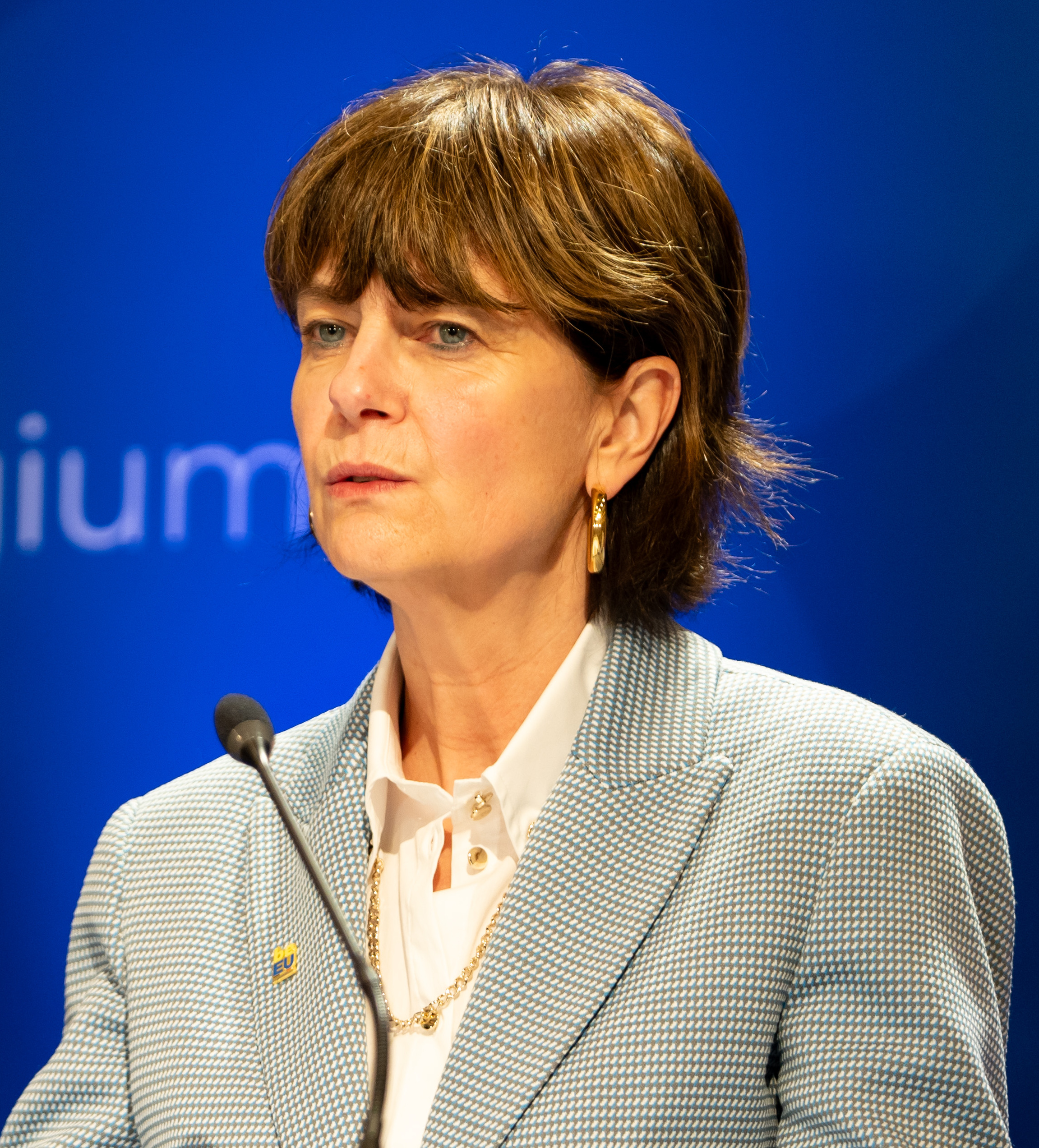
- De Bue in 2024

President of the Senate
- In office 25 July 2024 – 3 February 2025
- Preceded by: Stephanie D'Hose
- Succeeded by: Vincent Blondel

Member of the Senate
- Incumbent
- Assumed office 25 May 2014
- Appointed by: Parliament of Wallonia

Member of the Parliament of Wallonia
- Incumbent
- Assumed office 25 May 2014
- Constituency: Arrondissement of Nivelles

Member of the Chamber of Representatives
- In office 18 May 2003 – 25 May 2014
- Constituency: Walloon Brabant

Member of the Nivelles City Council
- In office 8 October 2006 – 25 May 2014

Personal details
- Born: 7 October 1966 (age 59) Vilvoorde, Belgium
- Party: MR (since 2000)
- Education: UCLouvain
- Occupation: Economist • Politician
- Awards: Order of Leopold (2010)

Valérie De Bue (French pronunciation: [valeʁi də by]; born 7 October 1966) is a Belgian politician of the Reformist Movement serving as president of the Senate since 2024. She was a member of the Chamber of Representatives from 2003 to 2014, a member of the Parliament of Wallonia from 2014 to 2017, and a member of the government of Wallonia from 2017 to 2024.
