= Bart Tommelein =

Flemish politician

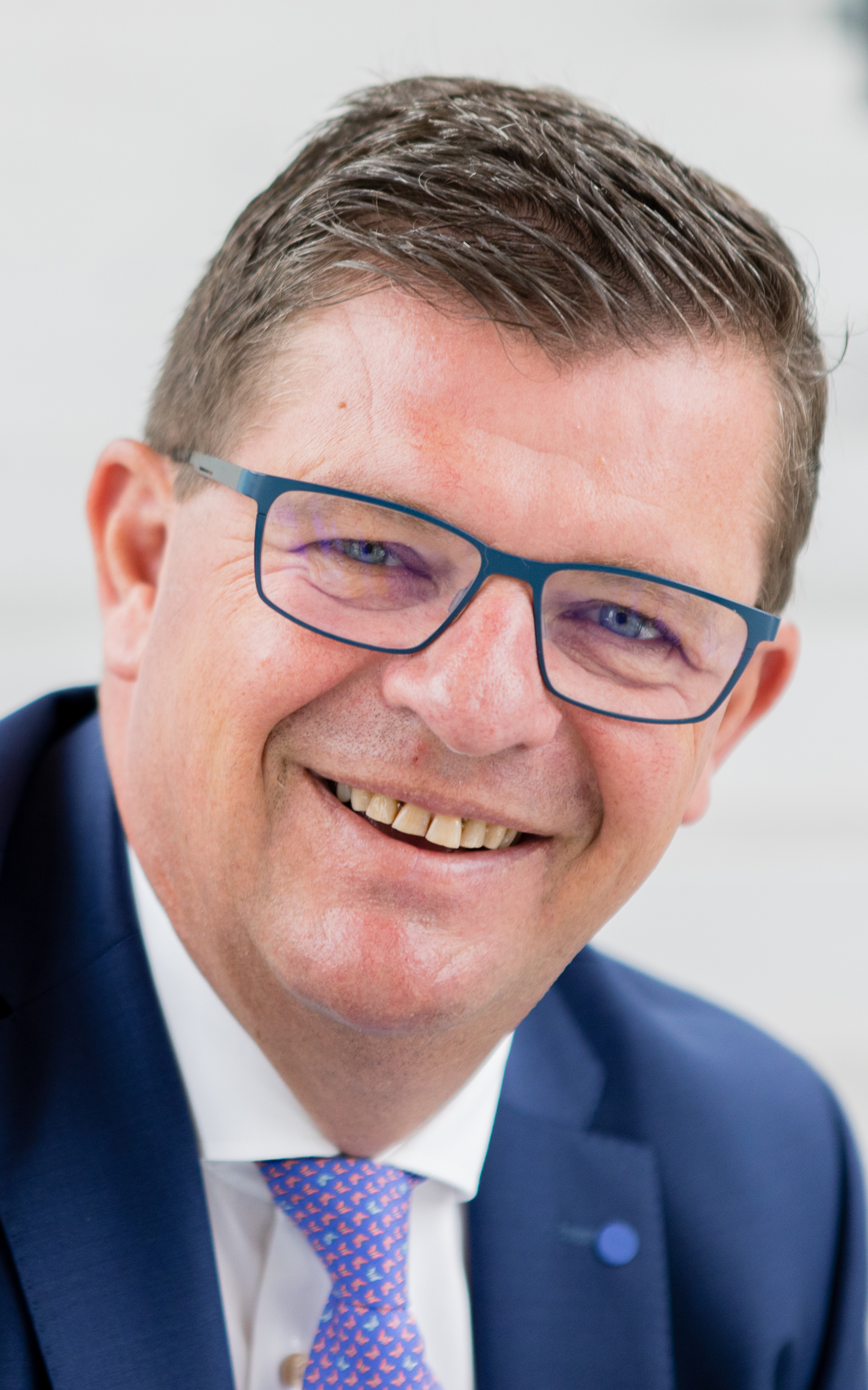
- Bart Tommelein in 2018

Flemish Deputy Minister-President and Flemish Minister of Budget, Finance and Energy
- In office 4 May 2016 – 30 November 2018
- Prime Minister: Geert Bourgeois
- Preceded by: Annemie Turtelboom
- Succeeded by: Lydia Peeters

Secretary of State for Social fraud, Privacy and the North Sea
- In office 11 October 2014 – 4 May 2016
- Prime Minister: Charles Michel
- Preceded by: Philippe Courard
- Succeeded by: Philippe De Backer

Personal details
- Born: 4 May 1962 (age 63)
- Party: Open Flemish Liberals and Democrats, now Anders (1999-2024)

Bart Joris Tommelein (born 4 May 1962) is a Belgian former politician for the Open Flemish Liberals and Democrats (now Anders) who was minister in the Bourgeois Government. On October 13, 2024 he announced his retirement from politics after suffering a defeat in the local elections.

== Career ==
Bart Tommelein was born in Ostend on 4 May 1962.

He started in the People's Union (Volksunie); he was chairman of the People's Union Youth (Volksunie Jongeren) from 1985 until 1990. However, he became member of the VLD in 1999.

He was member of the Chamber of Representatives from 2003 until 2009, where he was political group leader from 2008 to 2009. In 2009 he was elected to the Flemish Parliament, where he became political group leader in 2013.

In October 2014 Tommelein became Secretary of State for Social fraud, Privacy and the North Sea in the Michel Government.

On 4 May 2016 he succeeded Annemie Turtelboom as Vice Minister-President and Flemish Minister for Finance, Budget and Energy in the Bourgeois Government. He resigned from this position in November 2018 to be able to become mayor of Ostend, a position he took up in January 2019.
