= Carl Devlies =

Belgian politician (born 1953)

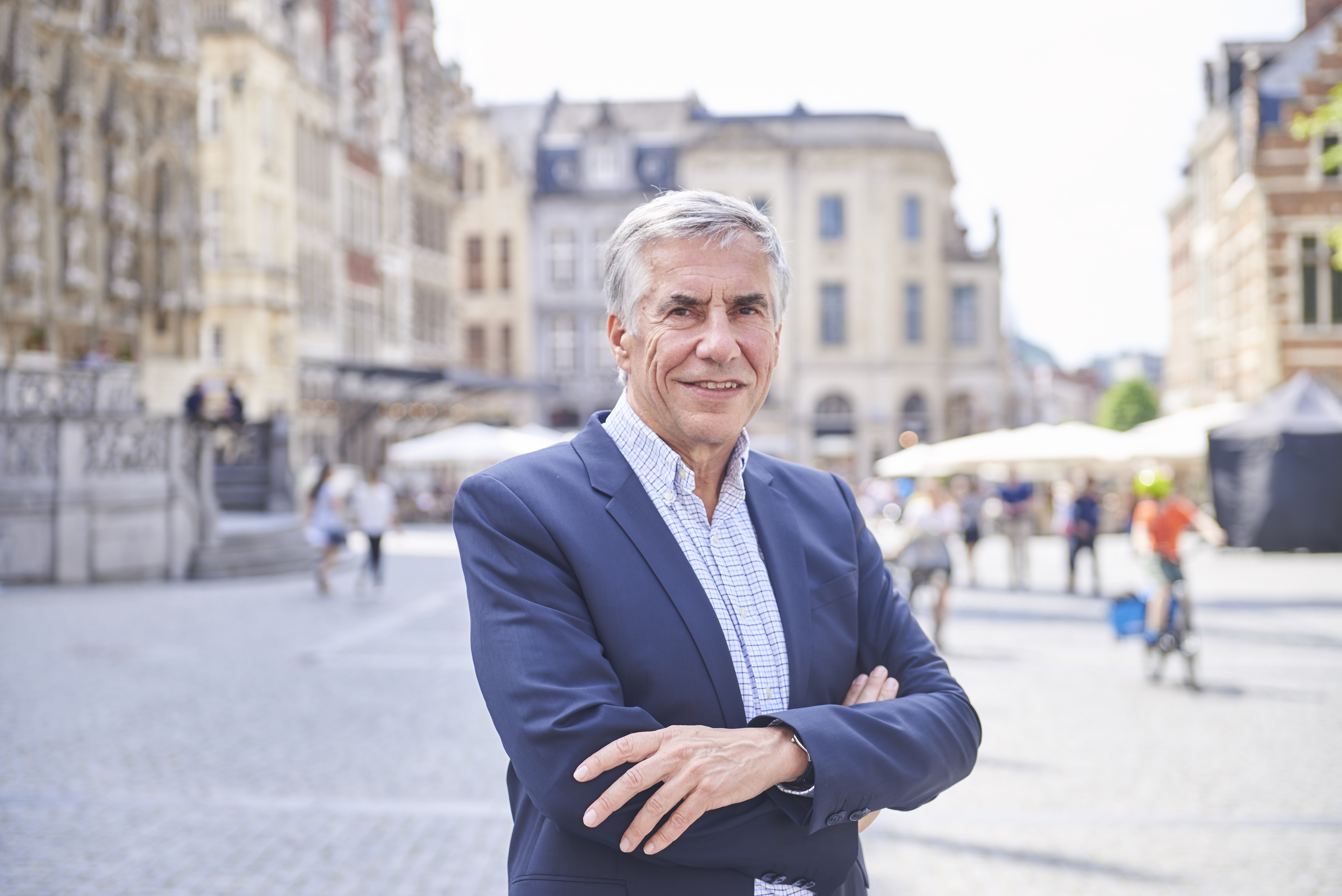

Carl Devlies (born 23 January 1953) is a Belgian politician. He is a member of the Flemish Christian-democratic party. At the moment he is a schepen in Leuven.

Devlies was born in Amsterdam.

== Career ==
- 2002–2008: Member of the Chamber of Representatives
- 2008–2011: State Secretary for Coordination of Fraud Prevention
- 2011–2013: Member of the Chamber of Representatives
- 2011–present: Schepen in Leuven
