= Geert Versnick =

Belgian politician (1956–2025)

- Versnick in 2016

Personal details
- Born: 15 December 1956 Ghent, Belgium
- Died: 8 November 2025 (aged 68)
- Citizenship: Belgian
- Party: Open VLD
- Occupation: Politician

Geert Versnick (15 December 1956 – 8 November 2025) was a Flemish liberal politician who was a member of Open Flemish Liberals and Democrats. He was a Member of the Belgian Chamber of Representatives from 1994 until 2010. Versnick had a degree in laws from the Ghent University.

From 2006 to 2012, he was Public Centre for Social Welfare president and schepen (member of the municipal executive) in Ghent. From 2012 onwards, he was deputy (member of the provincial executive) of East Flanders.

Versnick died on 8 November 2025, at the age of 68, after suffering from lung cancer.
