= Karine Lalieux =

Belgian politician (born 1964)

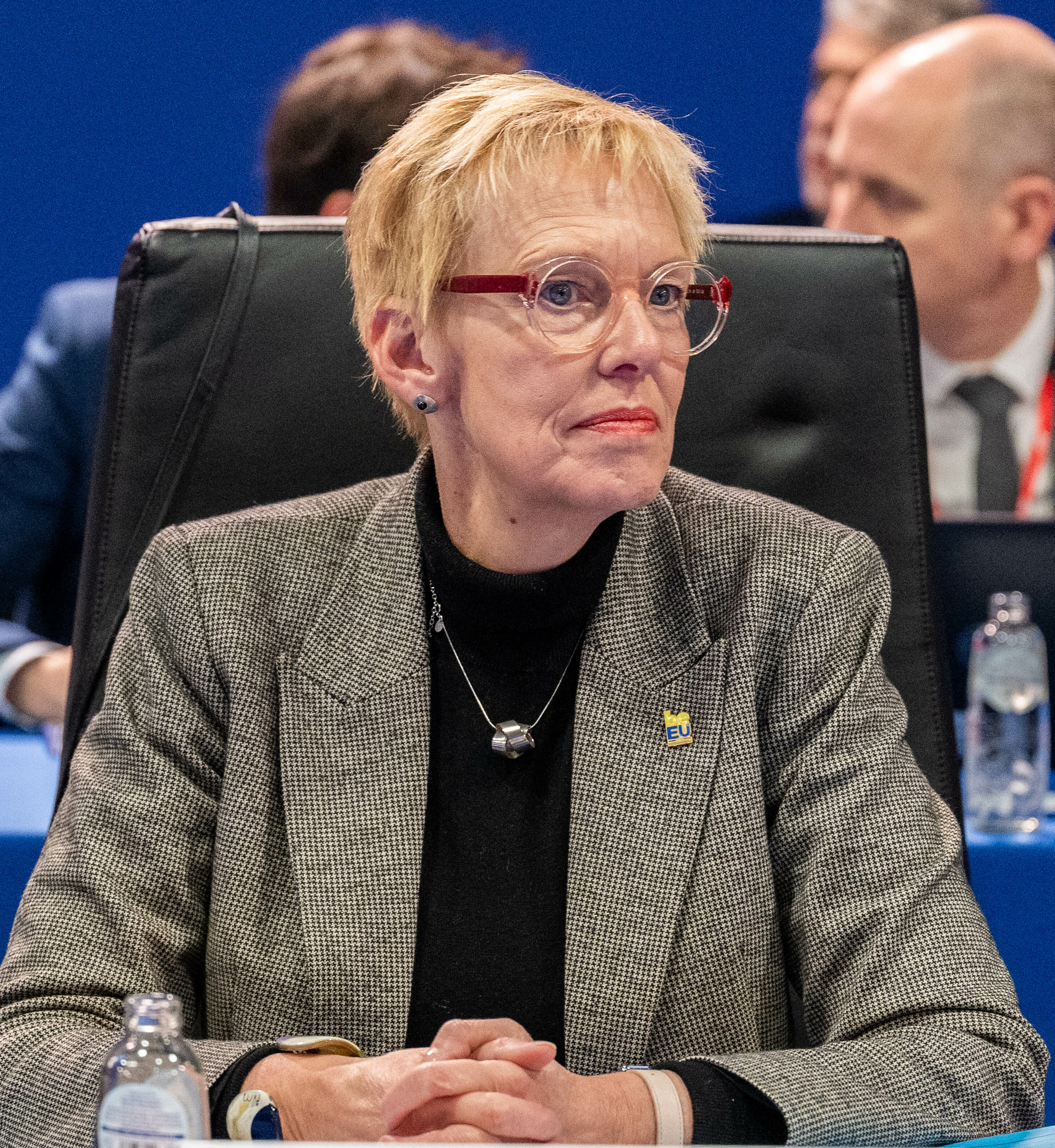
- Lalieux in 2024

Minister of Pensions, Social Integration, Fighting Poverty and Disabled Persons
- In office 1 October 2020 – 3 February 2025
- Monarch: Philippe
- Prime Minister: Alexander De Croo
- Preceded by: Daniel Bacquelaine
- Succeeded by: Jan Jambon

Personal details
- Born: 4 May 1964 (age 62) Anderlecht, Belgium
- Party: Parti Socialiste
- Education: Université libre de Bruxelles

Karine Lalieux (born 4 May 1964) is a Belgian politician of the Socialist Party (PS) who served as Minister of Pensions, Social Integration, Fighting Poverty and Disabled Persons in the government of Prime Minister Alexander De Croo between 2020 and 2025.
