= Guido Tastenhoye =

Member of the Chamber of Representatives
- In office 13 June 1999 – 10 June 2007

Municipal councilor in Deurne

Personal details
- Born: 7 August 1959 Leuven, Belgium
- Died: 8 March 2007 (aged 47) Deurne, Belgium
- Party: Vlaams Blok/Vlaams Belang

Guido Tastenhoye (born 7 August 1959; died 8 March 2007) was a Belgian author, journalist and politician of the Vlaams Blok and later Vlaams Belang party. He was known for his writing on Flemish history and public commentary.

== Biography ==
=== Journalism ===
Tastenhoye was born to a Flemish family in Deurne and grew up in Overijse. He later wrote that his interest in Flemish nationalism grew due to the Frenchification policy in Brussels. He later chaired a local nationalist group Flemish youth Overijse before studying Germanic philosophy at university.

From 1984 to 1999 he worked as a journalist for Gazet van Antwerpen and authored books on about Flemish problems in the outskirts of Brussels and Flemish Brabant. In 1993 he published "Towards the multicultural society?"

=== Politics ===
Tastenhoye resigned from his journalist role to become a candidate for the Vlaams Blok party ahead of the 1999 Belgian federal election. He was elected to the Chamber of Representatives for the Antwerp constituency and again in 2003. He sat on the committees for foreign affairs and home affairs. He was also a municipal councilor in Deurne until 2007. Tastenhoye did not contest the 2007 Belgian federal election and resigned his seat. He died the same year, although the cause of death was never made public his family said he had been suffering from depression and health problems.

=== Writings and beliefs ===
Tastenhoye often wrote in opposition to immigration and multiculturalism in Belgium and was a strong opponent of Turkey joining the European Union. Despite serving in the Chamber, he often regarded himself as an author above a politician. He predicted that in the event of Flemish independence, Brussels would become like Berlin during the Cold War and be a partitioned city with Dutch and French-speaking enclaves within Flanders. He also caused a stir during an interview with Plural magazine when he suggested Flanders could follow the example of the Soviet Union by cutting off supplies to Brussels if it refused to join an independent Flanders. In 2006, he also made headlines when he went against the position of the Vlaams Belang by supporting giving asylum to a Kazakh family who lived close to him in Brussels who had been blocked from obtaining legal residency.

== Publications ==
- Flemish Brabant in the stranglehold of Europe (1991)
- Towards the multicultural society? (1993)
- Flemish Brabant annexed to Brussels? (1997)
