= Linda Vissers =

Belgian politician (born 1961)

Linda Vissers (born 5 February 1961) is a member of the Flemish Parliament from the right-wing, separatist Vlaams Belang party of Belgium.
