= Rik Daems =

Belgian painter and politician

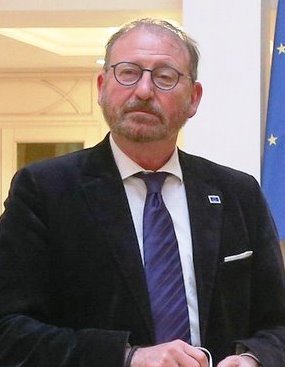
- Daems in 2021
- Born: Hendrik Jules Joseph Daems; 18 August 1959 (age 66); Aarschot, Belgium
- Occupation: politician
- Spouse: Sophie Pécriaux

Hendrik Jules Joseph "Rik" Daems (born 18 August 1959) is a Belgian politician, painter and wine trader who served as the president of the Parliamentary Assembly of the Council of Europe from 2020 to 2022, a 70-year-old body bringing together parliamentarians from 47 nations of the Council of Europe. He served as a member of the Belgian Chamber of Representatives for the Open Flemish Liberals and Democrats (VLD) and member of the city council of Leuven.

== Early life and education ==
Rik Daems' father, Jos Daems, was a senator and Secretary of State for the Party for Freedom and Progress (PVV). Rik Daems studied Latin and mathematics at the Keerbergen high school (1977). Afterwards he studied at the Solvay Business School of the Vrije Universiteit Brussel.

== Political career ==
In addition to his role in national politics, Daems has been a member of the Belgian delegation to the Parliamentary Assembly of the Council of Europe since 2007, and led the Alliance of Liberals and Democrats for Europe – the third largest of the assembly's five political groups –- from 2017 until his election as president. In 2019, he was the assembly's rapporteur on the activities of the European Bank for Reconstruction and Development (EBRD) as well as on minimum standards for electoral systems.

== Recognition ==
- 2014 : Knight Grand Cross in the Order of Leopold II.
