= Filip De Man =

Flemish politician (born 1955)

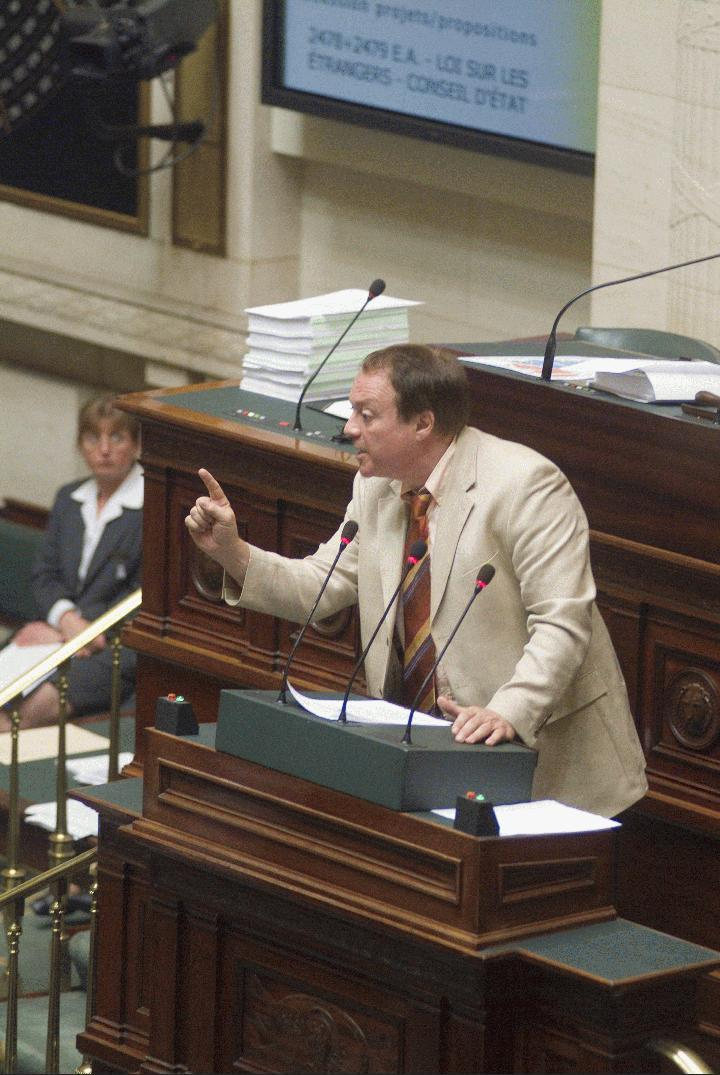
- Born: 11 November 1955 (age 70); Roeselare, West Flanders
- Occupation: politician
- Office: Federal Representative

Filip Emiel Julien De Man (born 11 November 1955) is a Flemish politician and journalist. He has an M.A. in philosophy and lives in Vilvoorde, Flemish Brabant. He is the brother of actress Brigitte De Man and the son of Jos De Man, a well-known lawyer and writer.

== Career in Vlaams Belang ==
De Man was born in Roeselare. In 1991 he became a member of Parliament for Vlaams Belang (formerly the Vlaams Blok). Within his party he belongs to the outspoken right-wing group, with a strong focus on immigration. He was quoted saying that a Muslim cannot be a democrat. In the Chamber he strongly rejects naturalisations and amnesty for undocumented migrants. Regarding crime statistics, he advocates honest information to citizens. As a partisan of a tough approach on crime, he favours the actual serving of prison sentences, the death penalty for child murderers such as Dutroux and Aït Oud, the expelling of criminally convicted foreigners and the active tracking down of terrorist cells.

As for energy and climate, he states that nuclear power plants of the third and fourth generation in conjunction with the 'hydrogen economy' can be an answer to petrol blackmail by hostile regimes and to problems regarding energy supply - and would in no way be harmful regarding climate change (of which he doubts mankind is the prime reason responsible).

With regard to the problems between Flemings and Walloons, De Man is of the opinion that "Good governance = Flemish governance". He advocates the introduction of the concept of sub-nationality in Brussels, implying that inhabitants could freely opt for a Flemish social and fiscal regime. According to him, this would lead to a stronger position in the eventual negotiations on the breaking-up of Belgium ('Congress book Brussels', 1999). His views on Europe are confederate, with a strong emphasis on the principle of subsidiarity and the creation of a 'Fortress Europe' in order to counter mass immigration from the other side of the Mediterranean.

== Publications ==
- 1999 'De Zaak Demol, een commisaris geflikt', translated into French: 'L'affaire Demol. Un poulet chez les ânes' (The Demol Case. How a police chief got framed).
- 2003 'De Eeuwige Strijd. Hellas, Rome en Europa in het juiste perspectief' ('The Eternal Struggle. Hellas, Rome and Europe in their correct perspective')
- 2007 'L'Etat-PS. De maffia aan de macht'. Co-authored with Frank Vanhecke, translated into French: 'L'Etat PS. La mafia au pouvoir' (The Walloon PS State. The Maffia in power)
- 2007 'De Eeuwige Strijd II. Europa: van Dageraad tot Avondland' ('The Eternal Struggle II. Europe: from Dawn till Occident'

In the first two volumes of 'The Eternal Struggle' De Man asserts himself as an adversary of cultural relativism and egalitarianism. He sides with geneticists, socio-biologists and evolutionary psychologists.

De Man was a co-author of several party publications: 'De kostprijs van de immigratie' (The cost of immigration), 'Requisitoir tegen de drugsprofeten' (Requisitory against the drugs prophets), 'Waarheen met de politiediensten?' (Where to with the police force?', 'AIDS: geen paniek?' (AIDS, no reason for panic?), 'Criminaliteit: harde aanpak!' (Crime: a tough approach!), 'Vlaams Blok: de gezinspartij' (Vlaams Blok: the family-oriented party), 'Dossier politieke vluchtelingen' (The refugees issue).

== Political functions ==
- Municipal councillor in Vilvoorde
- Federal Representative since 24 November 1991
