= Koen Bultinck =

Belgian politician (born 1964)

Municipal Councillor of Diksmuide
- Incumbent
- Assumed office 2019

Member of the Chamber of Representatives
- In office 13 June 1999 – 25 May 2014

6 May 2010

Personal details
- Born: Koen Henk Jan Lodewijk Bultinck; 21 March 1964 (age 62) Bruges, Belgium
- Party: New Flemish Alliance
- Other political affiliations: Vlaams Blok (1993–2004); Vlaams Belang (2004–2010)

Koen Henk Jan Lodewijk Bultinck (born 21 March 1964 in Bruges) is a Belgian politician of the N-VA party. He was formerly active in the Vlaams Belang and a member of the Chamber of Representatives.

Bultinck studied political science at Ghent University and was coordinator of the research department of the former Vlaams Blok and various Flemish nationalist groups until his election to parliament. He represented Vlaams Belang in the Chamber of Representatives from 13 June 1999 to 2014. He sat on the committees of home affairs and health.

In January 2018, he left Vlaams Belang, citing that he was a "pure Flemish nationalist" and claiming that the VB was more focused on crude anti-immigration messages over Flemish independence. In June 2018, he joined the New Flemish Alliance. Since 2019, he has been a municipal councilor of Diksmuide for the party.
