= Hagen Goyvaerts =

Member of the Chamber of Representatives
- In office 13 June 1999 – 25 May 2014

Personal details
- Born: Hagen Jeroen Goyvaerts; 23 March 1961 (age 65) Antwerp, Belgium
- Party: Vlaams Belang (2004-)
- Other political affiliations: Vlaams Blok (before 2004)

Hagen Jeroen Goyvaerts (born 23 March 1961) is a Belgian engineer and politician of the Vlaams Belang party and a former federal parliamentarian in the Chamber of Representatives.

== Biography ==
Goyvaerts trained as an industrial engineer and worked in the energy department as a power plant nuclear safety officer.

He became district chairman of the Vlaams Blok in Leuven and was elected to the Chamber of Representatives for the party during the 1999 Belgian federal election for the arrisdonment of Leuven which later became the Flemish Brabant constituency. He was reelected in 2004 when Vlaams Blok was reorganised as Vlaams Belang, and again in 2007 and 2010. In the Chamber, he has been a member of the committees on Finance and Budget, the Court of Audit subcommittee of the Finance and Budget Committee, the Advisory Committee on Scientific and Technological issues, the "Informatics" working group and the "Nuclear Safety" working group. He lost his seat in the 2014 Belgian federal election in which Vlaams Belang saw its members of parliament reduced.

After leaving parliament he started a real estate business. He continues to serve as a municipal councilor for Vlaams Belang in Leuven and is a member of the city planning committee.
