= Guy D'haeseleer =

Flemish politician and current mayor of Ninove (born 1969)

Guy August Marie-Louise D'haeseleer
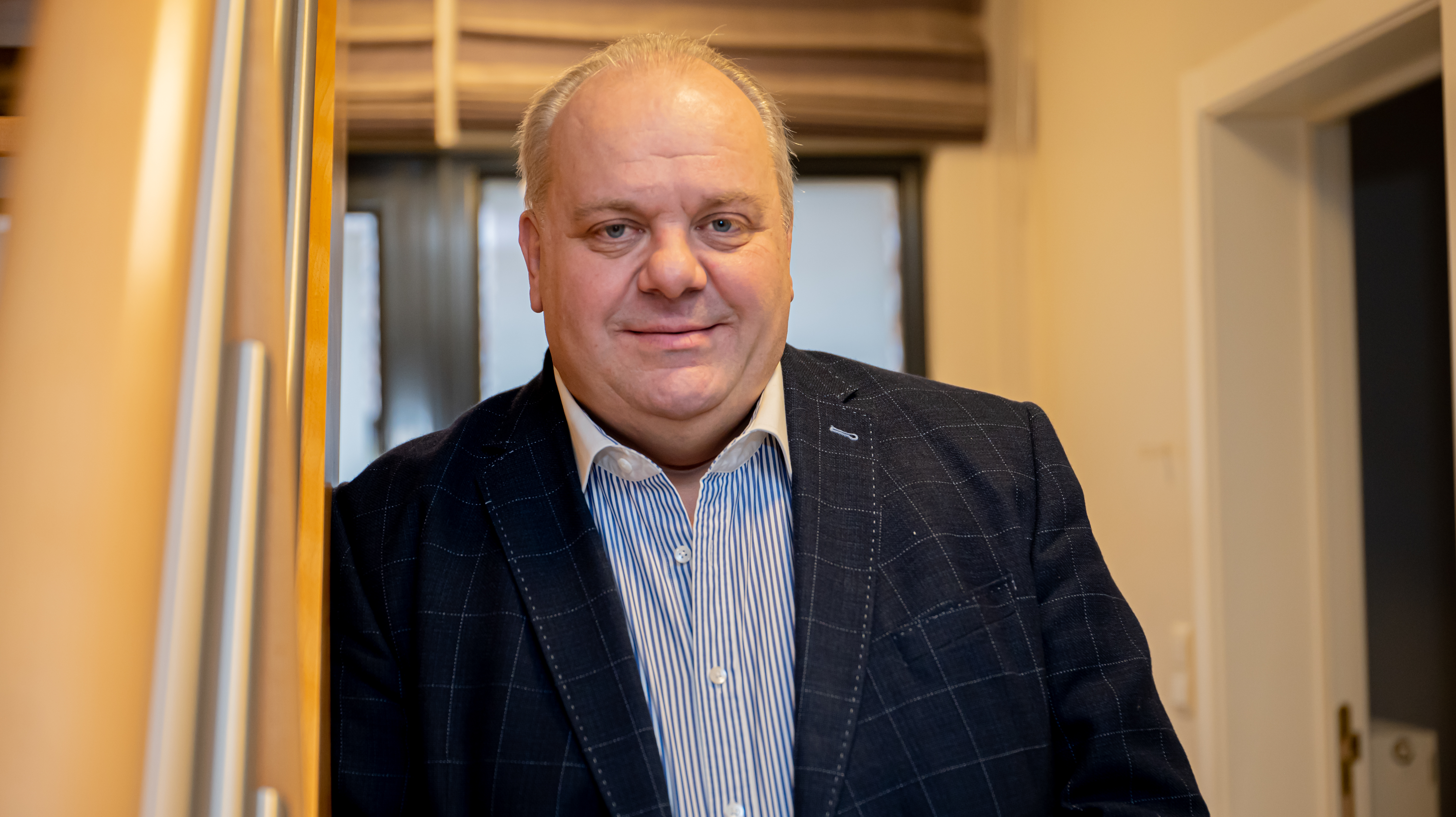

Mayor of Ninove
- Incumbent
- Assumed office 2024
- Preceded by: Tania De Jonge

Senate leader of Vlaams Belang
- Incumbent
- Assumed office 2014

Member of the Flemish Parliament
- Incumbent
- Assumed office 2014

Chamber of Representatives
- In office 1999–2010

Personal details
- Born: Guy August Marie-Louise D'haeseleer; 12 March 1969 (age 56); Ninove, Belgium
- Political party: Vlaams Belang (2004-) Vlaams Blok (1998-2004)

Guy August Marie-Louise D'haeseleer (born 12 March 1969) is a Belgian politician who has served as the Senate leader for Vlaams Belang since 2014 and is chairman of Forza Ninove, the local chapter of Vlaams Belang in the city of Ninove. After winning the 2024 local elections in Ninove, which resulted in an absolute majority for his party, D’haeseleer became Mayor of Ninove.

== Biography ==
D'haeseleer graduated with a degree in social work at the Erasmus Brussels University of Applied Sciences and Arts. After, he worked as a consultant at the Flemish Public Employment Services (VDAB) and then as a social inspector for the Belgian National Employment Office. From 1994 to 1999 he worked as a parliamentary assistant for the Vlaams Blok fraction in the Chamber of Representatives. In the 1999 elections, D'haeseleer was elected a member of the Chamber of Representatives for the district of Aalst as an MP for Vlaams Blok. Following the dissolution of Vlaams Blok in 2004, he joined its successor Vlaams Belang. In the 2014 elections, D'haeseleer headed the Vlaams Belang list for the Flemish Parliament in the East Flanders constituency and was elected. Since 2014, he has also been a state senator in the Belgian Senate on behalf of the party. He was re-elected in the 2019 Flemish elections and subsequently re-designated as a state senator. Since 2019 he has been the VB group leader in the Senate.

D'haeseleer has also been a municipal councilor in Ninove since 1995. Since the 2012 municipal elections, he has been the party leader for Forza Ninove, the local branch of the VB. Under his leadership, Forza Ninove became the largest with a 40% electoral rate and 15 out of 33 city council seats in 2018. D'haeseleer also received the most preference votes. In 2018, D'haeseleer caused controversy over a Facebook post about African people which was criticised as racist.
