= Dirk Van der Maelen =

Belgian politician

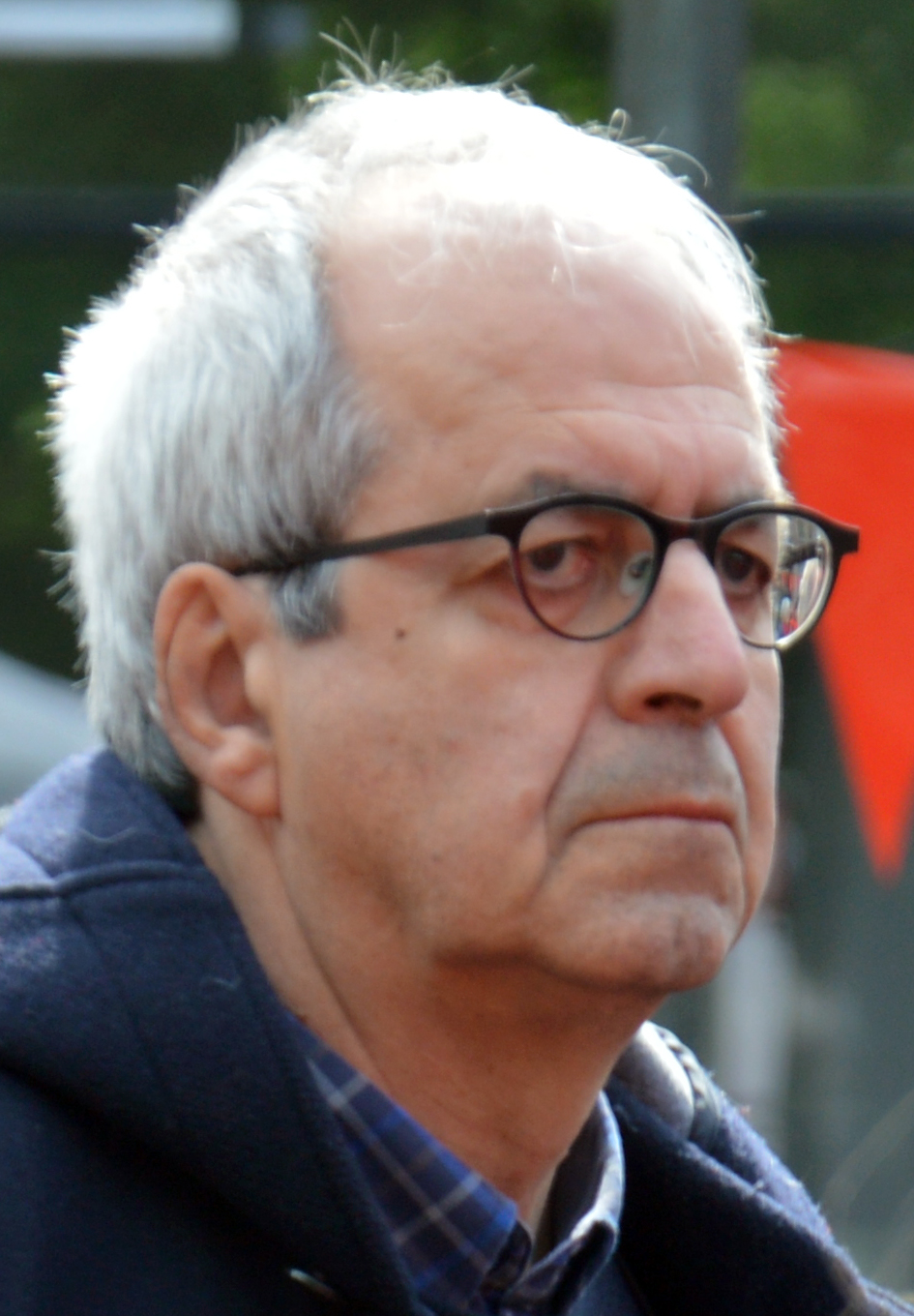

Member of the Belgian Parliament (Chamber of Representatives)
- Incumbent
- Assumed office 1989

Vice chairman of SP.A
- In office 2007–2011

Personal details
- Born: 14 March 1953 (age 73) Geraardsbergen, Belgium
- Party: SP.A
- Occupation: Politician
- Website: website

Dirk Leo Van der Maelen (born 14 March 1953) is a Belgian politician for the SP.A.

== Biography ==
Van der Maelen was born in Geraardsbergen. He has been a member of the Chamber of Representatives since 1989, where he specialised himself in finances and defence. Between 1999 and 2007 he served as faction leader of his party. Van der Maelen is also a member of the town council of his hometown Geraardsbergen. In 2010 the Flemish newspaper De Morgen called him the best parliamentarian of the previous legislature, with a score of 4.5/5.
