= Luc Sevenhans =

Belgian politician (born 1954)

Senator
- In office 6 July 2010 – 2012

Personal details
- Born: 6 September 1954 (age 71) Brasschaat, Antwerp
- Party: Vlaams Belang (2024-)
- Other political affiliations: N-VA (2009-2024); Vlaams Belang (2004-2009); Vlaams Blok (1988-2004); Volksunie (1988)
- Website: http://www.n-va.be/cv/luc-sevenhans

Luc Sevenhans (born 6 September 1954, in Brasschaat) is a Belgian politician affiliated to the N-VA and Vlaams Belang until 2009 and again from 2024.

== Biography ==
Before his political career, Sevenhans worked for the Port of Antwerp. He was the founder of the local Vlaams Blok branch in Brasschaat in 1988, allegedly alongside Jan Jambon.

He was a member of the Chamber of Representatives from 1997 until 2010 for Vlaams Belang. In 2009, he joined the N-VA party and was a member of the Belgian Senate from 2010 until 2012 as a replacement for Philippe Muyters. He was also the vice-chairman of the Belgian delegation to the Parliamentary Assembly of the Council of Europe. From 2003 to 2010 he was also member of the Benelux Parliament. In 2024, Sevenhans announced he had rejoined Vlaams Belang.

He is the municipal councillor of Brasschaat since 1989.
