= Bert Schoofs =

Flemish politician (born 1967)

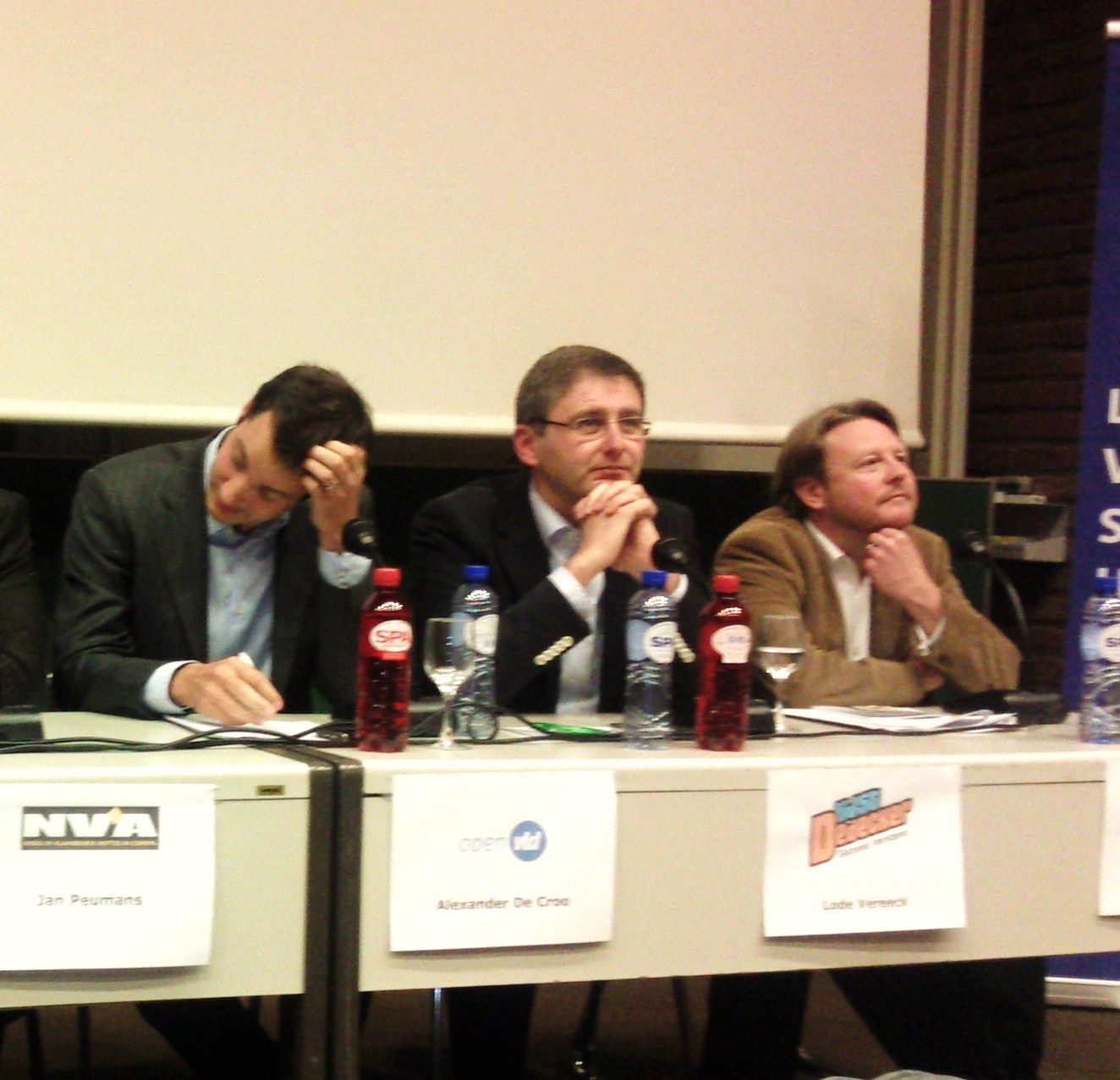
- Alexander De Croo, Lode Vereeck and Bert Schoofs during a debate at Hasselt University before the 2010 Belgian federal election

Member of the Chamber of Representatives
- In office 13 June 1999 – 25 May 2014

Member of the Municipal Council for Beringen

Personal details
- Born: Bert August Flor Herman Schoofs; 10 June 1967 (age 59) Koersel, Belgium
- Party: Vlaams Blok (1999-2004); Vlaams Belang (2004-)
- Other political affiliations: VOLUIT

Bert August Flor Herman Schoofs (born 10 June 1967) is a Belgian lawyer and former politician of the Vlaams Blok and its successor Vlaams Belang party.

== Biography ==
Schoofs graduated in law at KU Leuven and later a degree in economics at Hogeschool-Universiteit Brussel. He practiced as a lawyer in Limburg from 1993 to 2002 and is a member of the Bar of Hasselt.

He was first elected to the Chamber of Representatives for the Flemish nationalist Vlaams Blok party in the 1999 Belgian federal election for the Limburg list constituency. He subsequently became the faction leader for the Vlaams Blok in the Chamber, and again when the party was reconstituted as Vlaams Belang. Schoofs was also a member of the national party board of Vlaams Belang from early 2001 to early 2013. From January 2001 to December 2012 he was party leader for this party in the former mining municipality of Beringen. In the 2012 municipal elections, he formed a joint-list with members of the Lijst Dedecker party (which had entered an electoral cartel with the Vlaams Belang) under the name Safe Beringen Liveable Villages (VBLD). The list won four seats on the municipal council.

Schoofs narrowly failed to be re-elected to the Chamber during the 2014 Belgian federal election in which many Vlaams Belang representatives lost their seats in the party's worst result. Shortly after, Schoofs announced his retirement from national politics.

After his career in the Federal Parliament, Schoofs studied for a master's degree in business management and set up a foundation to encourage young people to become entrepreneurs. From October 2016 to March 2018 he was director of the Flemish People's Movement. In 2020, he announced that he was releasing a historical thriller novel.

In 2018, Schoofs made a return to local politics as part of the Flemish VOLUIT national liberal municipal coalition formed by former Open VLD, N-VA, CD&V and Vlaams Belang members. Schoofs won a seat on the Limburg council and was offered the position of alderman but declined.
