= Francis Van den Eynde =

Belgian politician (1946–2021)

Municipal Councillor of Ghent
- In office 1988–2012

Member of the Chamber of Representatives for the Electoral district of Ghent
- In office 24 November 1991 – 5 June 2010

Member of the Flemish Parliament
- In office 1992–1995

Vice-President of the Chamber of Representatives
- In office 1999–2001

Personal details
- Born: 1 April 1946 Brussels, Belgium
- Died: 4 March 2021 (aged 74) Aalst, Belgium
- Party: VU; VB; VB

Francis Van den Eynde (1 April 1946 – 4 March 2021) was a Belgian politician. He was heavily involved in the Flemish Movement and was part of the Vlaams Blok and Vlaams Belang. He served in the Chamber of Representatives from 1991 to 2010. He was a neopagan.
