= Sociaal-Liberale Partij =

- Leader: Geert Lambert
- Founded: 2001 (as Spirit)
- Dissolved: 2009
- Split from: People's Union
- Merged into: Groen
- Headquarters: National secretariat Woeringenstraat 21 Brussels
- Ideology: Social liberalism Green liberalism Social democracy Flemish regionalism
- Political position: Centre to centre-left
- European affiliation: European Free Alliance

Website
- www.s-lp.be

Sociaal-Liberale Partij (Dutch pronunciation: [soːˈɕaːlibəˌraːlə pɑrˈtɛi], abbr. SLP; Dutch for Social Liberal Party) was a Belgian Flemish political party formed after dissolution of the moderate nationalist People's Union (Volksunie) party. Prior to 19 April 2008 it was known as Spirit, and intermediately as Flemish Progressives (VlaamsProgressieven). The party merged with Groen in the end of 2009, ceasing to exist.

== History ==
The People's Union split up into two parties, the social liberal Spirit and the centre-right New-Flemish Alliance (N-VA), which formed an electoral alliance with the Christian Democratic and Flemish (CD&V) party. The formation of the alliances was seen as a way in which Spirit and N-VA could guarantee their influence and position in Flemish and Belgian politics. This led the liberal wing to initially opt for an Alliance with Flemish Liberals and Democrats.

== Abbreviation ==
Spirit was the abbreviation for

- Sociaal (Social)
- Progressief (Progressive)
- Internationaal (International)
- Regionalistisch (Regional)
- Integraal-democratisch (Completely democratic)
- Toekomstgericht (Future oriented)

== 2007 elections ==
In the 10 June 2007 general elections, the Social Liberal party was in an electoral alliance with Socialist Party Different (sp.a) and won 14 out of 88 Flemish seats in the Chamber of Representatives and 4 out of 40 Flemish seats in the Senate.

In the autumn of 2008, following a scandal causing its leader, Bettina Geysen to step down, the Social Liberal Party ended its cooperation with SP.A. Geert Lambert was elected the new leader. Many prominent party members, including cofounder Bert Anciaux, left the party.

== See also ==
- L² - The youth organization of Vl.Pro
