= Jan Peeters (politician) =

Flemish politician (born 1963)

- Born: 12 January 1963 (age 63); Herentals, Belgium
- Occupation: politician

Jan Peeters (Dutch: [jɑm ˈpeːtərs]; born 12 January 1963) is a Flemish politician and member of the Different Socialist Party (SP.A). He is a Member of the Belgian Chamber of Representatives and was a Secretary of State for four years. He was a minister for a short while in 1999 following the resignation of Marcel Colla. He is also the Mayor of Herentals since 2001. In May 2010, he announced that he would leave national politics.

== Political career ==
- 1991 - 1995: Member of the Belgian Chamber of Representatives
- 1995 - 1999: Secretary of State for Safety, Social Integration and Environment
- 1999: Minister of Pensions, Safety, Social Integration and Environment
- 1999 - 2010: Member of the Belgian Chamber of Representatives
- 2001–present: Mayor of Herentals
