= Bart Laeremans =

Belgian politician (born 1966)

- Born: 17 April 1966 (age 59); Ghent, Belgium
- Occupations: politician, lawyer

Bart Laeremans (born 17 April 1966) is since 21 May 1995 member of the Belgian Chamber of Representatives for the Vlaams Belang for the constituency Brussels-Halle-Vilvoorde.

== Career ==
He studied law at the Katholieke Universiteit Leuven (licenciate in 1990) and postgraduate Media and Informatics (K.U.Leuven, 1991). He was active as a solicitor from 1992 until 2004.

Laeremans is also municipal counselor and chairman of the party Flemish Interest (Vlaams Belang) within the municipal council of Grimbergen. In his municipality, he is regarded as one of the most popular politicians. He obtained for instance 2395 preference votes in the Belgian municipal elections in 2006, which is much above the second score, that one of Christian Democratic and Flemish mayor Eddy Willems, who obtained 1377 preference votes.

In the Chamber of Representatives, he's a member of these committees:

- Committee for Justice
- Committee for the Revision of the Constitution and the Institutions
- Working group of the Committee for the Revision of the Constitution responsible for the investigation of the proposals concerning the evaluation of the law
- Working group responsible for the investigation of Title II of the Constitution

He is substitute for the:

- Committee for the Naturalizations
- Committee responsible for the problems concerning Commercial and Economical Law
- Committee for the Finances and the Budget

== Family ties ==
His grandfather, Leo Wouters, was a senator representing the former Flemish nationalist party Volksunie.

His father, Johan Laeremans, was a treasurer and deputy-chairman of the Volksunie.

His brother Jan Laeremans is a provincial counselor in the province of Flemish Brabant.

His brother Dirk Laeremans was a chief-editor of Doorbraak, the magazine of the Vlaamse Volksbeweging the Flemish popular movement.

== Works ==
- Verbrusseling, tegengaan of ondergaan ? (2007)
- Na ons de Zondvloed? (2014)

== Sources ==
- This article is based on the translation of the corresponding article of the Dutch Wikipedia.
