= Antwerp (Chamber of Representatives constituency) =

Parliamentary constituency in Belgium

- Antwerpen; Anvers; Antwerpen
- Constituency for the Chamber of Representatives
- Location of Antwerp within Belgium
- Province: Antwerp
- Region: Flanders
- Population: 1,926,522 (2025)
- Electorate: 1,373,924 (2024)
- Area: 2,876 km^{2} (2024)

Current Constituency
- Created: 2003
- Seats: 24 (2003–present)
- Members: List: Staf Aerts (Groen); Meyrem Almaci (Groen); Jan Bertels (Vooruit); Dorien Cuylaerts (NV-A); Greet Daems (PVDA); Peter De Roover (NV-A); Sophie De Wit (NV-A); Marijke Dillen (VB); Achraf El Yakhloufi (Vooruit); Michael Freilich (NV-A); Tine Gielis (CD&V); Nahima Lanjri (CD&V); Peter Mertens (PVDA); Koen Metsu (NV-A); Ellen Samyn (VB); Oskar Seuntjens (Vooruit); Koen Van den Heuvel (CD&V); Wim Van der Donckt (NV-A); Reccino Van Lommel (VB); Katrijn van Riet (NV-A); Sam van Rooy (VB); Paul Van Tigchelt (Open Vld); Lode Vereeck (VB); Bert Wollants (NV-A)
- Created from: List: Antwerp; Mechelen-Turnhout

Antwerp (Dutch: Antwerpen; French: Anvers; German: Antwerpen) is one of the 11 multi-member constituencies of the Chamber of Representatives, the lower house of the Belgian Federal Parliament, the national legislature of Belgium. The constituency was established in 2003 following the re-organisation of constituencies across Belgium along provincial lines. It is conterminous with the province of Antwerp. The constituency currently elects 24 of the 150 members of the Chamber of Representatives using the open party-list proportional representation electoral system. At the 2024 federal election the constituency had 1,373,924 registered electors.

== Electoral system ==
Antwerp currently elects 24 of the 150 members of the Chamber of Representatives using the open party-list proportional representation electoral system. Seats are allocated using the D'Hondt method. Only parties that reach the 5% threshold in the constituency compete for seats.

Electors may vote for the list (party) or for individual candidates, either main candidates or substitute candidates or a combination, on the list. They may vote for as many candidates as there are seats in the constituency. Split-ticket voting (panachage) is not permitted and will result in the ballot paper being invalidated. The minimum number of votes a candidate must obtain to get elected - the quotient - is calculated as the total votes received by the party divided by the number of seats in the constituency plus one. Half the ballot papers where there are no votes for main candidates (i.e. the elector has voted for the list or for substitute candidates only) are redistributed amongst main candidates in the order they appear on the ballot paper so that the candidate's total votes (personal votes plus redistributed votes) equals the quotient. The seats won by the party are then allocated to the candidates with the most number of total votes.

== Election results ==
=== Summary ===
Election	Workers PVDA			Groen Groen / Agalev			Vooruit Vooruit / SP.A / SP.A-Spirit			Liberals & Democrats Open Vld / VLD			Christian Democrats CD&V			New Flemish N-VA / CD&V-N-VA			Vlaams Belang VB / VB		
Election	Votes	%	Seats	Votes	%	Seats	Votes	%	Seats	Votes	%	Seats	Votes	%	Seats	Votes	%	Seats	Votes	%	Seats
2024	125,257	10.52%	2	90,370	7.59%	2	127,973	10.74%	3	70,890	5.95%	1	125,894	10.57%	3	368,877	30.97%	8	249,826	20.97%	5
2019	88,430	7.65%	2	127,131	11.00%	2	93,114	8.05%	2	111,505	9.64%	2	128,036	11.07%	3	361,022	31.23%	8	217,333	18.80%	5
2014	51,638	4.52%	0	112,477	9.85%	2	132,096	11.57%	3	116,892	10.24%	2	183,636	16.09%	4	449,531	39.38%	11	79,852	7.00%	2
2010	22,132	2.02%	0	84,314	7.69%	2	156,976	14.32%	3	120,935	11.03%	3	170,260	15.53%	4	336,631	30.71%	8	177,012	16.15%	4
2007	14,955	1.34%	0	76,790	6.87%	1	184,686	16.51%	4	179,089	16.01%	4				327,558	29.28%	8	269,236	24.07%	6
2003	10,059	0.90%	0	50,366	4.50%	0	243,879	21.80%	6	243,623	21.77%	6	220,127	19.67%	5	49,028	4.38%	0	269,523	24.09%	7

(Figures in italics represent alliances.)

=== Detailed ===
==== 2024 ====
Results of the 2024 federal election held on 9 June 2024:

Party		Votes per arrondissement				Total votes	%	Seats
Party		Ant- werp	Mech- elen	Turn- hout	Expat- riates	Total votes	%	Seats
New Flemish Alliance	N-VA	205,400	69,607	90,035	3,835	368,877	30.97%	8
Vlaams Belang	VB	116,154	50,219	81,296	2,157	249,826	20.97%	5
Vooruit	Vooruit	64,021	27,163	35,478	1,311	127,973	10.74%	3
Christian Democratic and Flemish	CD&V	51,565	29,941	43,377	1,011	125,894	10.57%	3
Workers' Party of Belgium	PVDA	85,570	20,776	17,953	958	125,257	10.52%	2
Groen	Groen	54,871	17,277	15,654	2,568	90,370	7.59%	2
Open Flemish Liberals and Democrats	Open Vld	35,635	16,840	16,789	1,626	70,890	5.95%	1
DierAnimal		5,453	2,036	2,422	430	10,341	0.87%	0
For You	VU	3,964	1,829	2,724	122	8,639	0.73%	0
Blank Party	PB	3,442	1,721	1,936	122	7,221	0.61%	0
Volt Belgium	Volt	2,282	752	806	373	4,213	0.35%	0
Belgische Unie – Union Belge	BUB	810	339	466	71	1,686	0.14%	0
Valid votes		629,167	238,500	308,936	14,584	1,191,187	100.00%	24
Rejected votes		22,238	8,998	12,622	542	44,400	3.59%	
Total polled		651,405	247,498	321,558	15,126	1,235,587	89.93%	
Registered electors		725,530	268,432	347,162	32,800	1,373,924		
Turnout		89.78%	92.20%	92.62%	46.12%	89.93%		

The following candidates were elected: Staf Aerts (Groen), 7,290 votes; Meyrem Almaci (Groen), 23,876 votes; Jinnih Beels (Vooruit), 26,666 votes; Jan Bertels (Vooruit), 7,732 votes; Mireille Colson (N-VA), 10,728 votes; Dorien Cuylaerts (N-VA), 12,901 votes; Greet Daems (PVDA), 8,522 votes; Peter De Roover, (N-VA), 23,254 votes; Bart De Wever (N-VA), 255,446 votes; Sophie De Wit, (N-VA), 20,674 votes; Marijke Dillen (VB), 10,795 votes; Michael Freilich, (N-VA), 16,374 votes; Tine Gielis (CD&V), 8,991 votes; Peter Mertens (PVDA), 47,730 votes; Koen Metsu, (N-VA), 20,616 votes; Ellen Samyn (VB), 19,379 votes; Reccino Van Lommel (VB), 9,684 votes; Sam van Rooy (VB), 15,179 votes; Oskar Seuntjens (Vooruit), 6,826 votes; Koen Van den Heuvel (CD&V), 13,514 votes; Paul Van Tigchelt (Open Vld), 23,274 votes; Lode Vereeck (VB), 59,581 votes; Annelies Verlinden (CD&V), 65,307 votes; and Bert Wollants, (N-VA), 13,282 votes.

Substitutions:

- Jinnih Beels (Vooruit) resigned on 2 December 2024 and was substituted by Achraf El Yakhloufi (Vooruit) on 5 December 2024.
- Mireille Colson (N-VA) resigned on 2 December 2024 and was substituted by Wim Van der Donckt (N-VA) on 5 December 2024.
- Bart De Wever (N-VA) was appointed Prime Minister of Belgium and was substituted by Katrijn van Riet (N-VA) on 4 February 2025.
- Annelies Verlinden (CD&V) was appointed to the federal government and was substituted by Nahima Lanjri (CD&V) on 4 February 2025.

==== 2019 ====
Results of the 2019 federal election held on 26 May 2019:

Party		Votes per arrondissement				Total votes	%	Seats
Party		Ant- werp	Mech- elen	Turn- hout	Expat- riates	Total votes	%	Seats
New Flemish Alliance	N-VA	206,322	67,482	86,512	706	361,022	31.23%	8
Vlaams Belang	VB	103,564	44,912	68,642	215	217,333	18.80%	5
Christian Democratic and Flemish	CD&V	49,339	31,143	47,335	219	128,036	11.07%	3
Groen	Groen	77,781	26,315	22,426	609	127,131	11.00%	2
Open Flemish Liberals and Democrats	Open Vld	56,573	28,291	26,038	603	111,505	9.64%	2
Socialist Party Different	SP.A	49,166	19,653	24,085	210	93,114	8.05%	2
Workers' Party of Belgium	PVDA	54,929	16,527	16,857	117	88,430	7.65%	2
DierAnimal		7,263	2,955	3,299	27	13,544	1.17%	0
Pirate Party		4,215	1,653	1,644	9	7,521	0.65%	0
Democratic Solidarity Appeal	D-SA	2,956	306	339	4	3,605	0.31%	0
Peace and Solidarity Party	PV&S	2,664	267	280	6	3,217	0.28%	0
Volt Belgium	Volt	881	459	314	15	1,669	0.14%	0
Valid votes		615,653	239,963	297,771	2,740	1,156,127	100.00%	24
Rejected votes		20,078	10,107	13,883	119	44,187	3.68%	
Total polled		635,731	250,070	311,654	2,859	1,200,314	89.48%	
Registered electors		717,565	279,120	340,829	3,936	1,341,450		
Turnout		88.60%	89.59%	91.44%	72.64%	89.48%		

The following candidates were elected: Jan Bertels (SP.A), 9,995 votes; Kim Buyst (Groen), 12,302 votes; Kristof Calvo (Groen), 39,216 votes; Greet Daems (PVDA), 7,268 votes; Peter De Roover, (N-VA), 26,609 votes; Sophie De Wit, (N-VA), 19,218 votes; Marijke Dillen (VB), 8,645 votes; Michael Freilich, (N-VA), 12,829 votes; Jan Jambon (N-VA), 187,826 votes; Yasmine Kherbache (SP.A), 26,901 votes; Nahima Lanjri (CD&V), 14,380 votes; Christian Leysen (Open Vld), 22,725 votes; Peter Mertens (PVDA), 46,802 votes; Koen Metsu, (N-VA), 24,017 votes; Ellen Samyn (VB), 12,106 votes; Yoleen Van Camp, (N-VA), 21,202 votes; Jef Van den Bergh (CD&V), 12,172 votes; Tom Van Grieken (VB), 122,232 votes; Reccino Van Lommel (VB), 8,051 votes; Valerie Van Peel (N-VA), 41,320 votes; Marianne Verhaert (Open Vld), 11,082 votes; Servais Verherstraeten (CD&V), 36,464 votes; Hans Verreyt (VB), 8,043 votes; and Bert Wollants, (N-VA), 15,603 votes.

Substitutions:

- Jan Jambon (N-VA) resigned on 3 October 2019 after he was appointed Minister-President of Flanders and was substituted by Wim Van der Donckt (N-VA).
- Yasmine Kherbache (SP.A) resigned on 17 December 2019 and was substituted by Ben Segers (SP.A) on 19 December 2019.
- Jan Bertels (SP.A) resigned on 1 November 2020 and was substituted by Gitta Vanpeborgh (SP.A) on 12 November 2020.

==== 2014 ====
Results of the 2014 federal election held on 25 May 2014:

Party		Votes per arrondissement				Total votes	%	Seats
Party		Ant- werp	Mech- elen	Turn- hout	Expat- riates	Total votes	%	Seats
New Flemish Alliance	N-VA	245,552	87,182	116,251	546	449,531	39.38%	11
Christian Democratic and Flemish	CD&V	75,459	41,105	66,853	219	183,636	16.09%	4
Socialist Party Different	SP.A	75,006	28,045	28,848	197	132,096	11.57%	3
Open Flemish Liberals and Democrats	Open Vld	59,809	28,198	28,432	453	116,892	10.24%	2
Groen	Groen	68,317	21,797	22,042	321	112,477	9.85%	2
Vlaams Belang	VB	44,479	15,368	19,904	101	79,852	7.00%	2
Workers' Party of Belgium	PVDA	35,347	8,082	8,152	57	51,638	4.52%	0
Pirate Party		6,079	2,344	2,688	25	11,136	0.98%	0
ROSSEM		1,348	605	1,025	6	2,984	0.26%	0
Belgische Unie – Union Belge	BUB	677	248	355	19	1,299	0.11%	0
Valid votes		612,073	232,974	294,550	1,944	1,141,541	100.00%	24
Rejected votes		22,371	10,215	14,917	135	47,638	4.01%	
Total polled		634,444	243,189	309,467	2,079	1,189,179	90.02%	
Registered electors		712,716	268,951	336,643	2,743	1,321,053		
Turnout		89.02%	90.42%	91.93%	75.79%	90.02%		

The following candidates were elected: Meyrem Almaci (Groen), 44,150 votes; Rita Bellens (N-VA), 9,546 votes; Kristof Calvo (Groen), 13,409 votes; Monica De Coninck (SP.A), 35,441 votes; Zuhal Demir (N-VA), 19,473 votes; Peter De Roover, (N-VA), 16,717 votes; Maya Detiège (SP.A), 19,111 votes; Bart De Wever (N-VA), 314,650 votes; Filip Dewinter (VB), 43,157 votes; Sophie De Wit, (N-VA), 16,660 votes; Marijke Dillen (VB), 5,379 votes; David Geerts (SP.A), 9,497 votes; Jan Jambon (N-VA), 29,616 votes; Nahima Lanjri (CD&V), 19,614 votes; Koen Metsu, (N-VA), 10,971 votes; Griet Smaers (CD&V), 15,879 votes; Annemie Turtelboom (Open Vld), 44,959 votes; Yoleen Van Camp, (N-VA), 11,221 votes; Jef Van den Bergh (CD&V), 16,545 votes; Robert Van de Velde (N-VA), 10,208 votes; Dirk Van Mechelen (Open Vld), 16,161 votes; Valerie Van Peel (N-VA), 13,322 votes; Servais Verherstraeten (CD&V), 51,202 votes; and Bert Wollants, (N-VA), 10,487 votes.

Substitutions:

- Marijke Dillen (VB) resigned on 16 June 2014 and was substituted by Jan Penris (VB) on 19 June 2014.
- Jan Jambon (N-VA) was appointed to the federal government and was substituted by Johan Klaps (N-VA) on 14 October 2014.

==== 2010 ====
Results of the 2010 federal election held on 13 June 2010:

Party		Votes per arrondissement				Total votes	%	Seats
Party		Ant- werp	Mech- elen	Turn- hout	Expat- riates	Total votes	%	Seats
New Flemish Alliance	N-VA	182,127	62,964	91,264	276	336,631	30.71%	8
Vlaams Belang	VB	102,441	32,010	42,430	131	177,012	16.15%	4
Christian Democratic and Flemish	CD&V	70,897	39,432	59,771	160	170,260	15.53%	4
Socialist Party Different	SP.A	89,522	32,204	35,092	158	156,976	14.32%	3
Open Flemish Liberals and Democrats	Open Vld	66,268	27,420	26,996	251	120,935	11.03%	3
Groen	Groen	52,371	15,774	15,961	208	84,314	7.69%	2
List Dedecker	LDD	11,443	5,626	7,991	21	25,081	2.29%	0
Workers' Party of Belgium	PVDA	15,716	2,893	3,504	19	22,132	2.02%	0
Left Socialist Party	LSP	1,568	596	667	10	2,841	0.26%	0
Valid votes		592,353	218,919	283,676	1,234	1,096,182	100.00%	24
Rejected votes		22,962	10,526	18,161	31	51,680	4.50%	
Total polled		615,315	229,445	301,837	1,265	1,147,862	89.63%	
Registered electors		699,109	252,801	327,409	1,410	1,280,729		
Turnout		88.01%	90.76%	92.19%	89.72%	89.63%		

The following candidates were elected: Meyrem Almaci (Groen), 25,100 votes; Gerolf Annemans (VB), 56,226 votes; Kristof Calvo (Groen), 4,767 votes; Alexandra Colen (VB), 6,806 votes; Rita De Bont (VB), 9,870 votes; Zuhal Demir (N-VA), 10,248 votes; Minneke De Ridder (N-VA), 9,404 votes; Maya Detiège (SP.A), 18,901 votes; Sophie De Wit, (N-VA), 26,918 votes; Caroline Gennez (SP.A), 41,284 votes; Jan Jambon (N-VA), 61,100 votes; Patrick Janssens (SP.A), 32,104 votes; Nahima Lanjri (CD&V), 11,952 votes; Willem-Frederik Schiltz (Open Vld), 8,686 votes; Bart Somers (Open Vld), 18,030 votes; Annemie Turtelboom (Open Vld), 35,861 votes; Bruno Valkeniers (VB), 14,378 votes; Jef Van den Bergh (CD&V), 13,092 votes; Kris Van Dijck (N-VA), 15,607 votes; Jan Van Esbroeck (N-VA), 6,527 votes; Reinilde Van Moer (N-VA), 8,956 votes; Flor Van Noppen (N-VA), 21,635 votes; Servais Verherstraeten (CD&V), 22,353 votes; and Inge Vervotte (CD&V), 78,951 votes.

Substitutions:

- Patrick Janssens (SP.A) resigned on 28 June 2010 and was substituted by David Geerts (SP.A) on 6 July 2010.
- Kris Van Dijck (N-VA) resigned on 30 June 2010 and was substituted by Bert Wollants (N-VA) on 6 July 2010.
- Servais Verherstraeten (CD&V) was appointed to the federal government and was substituted by Kristof Waterschoot (CD&V) between 7 December 2011 and 9 January 2013; and by Nik Van Gool (CD&V) from 10 January 2013.
- Annemie Turtelboom (Open Vld) was appointed to the federal government and was substituted by Frank Wilrycx (Open Vld) on 7 December 2011.
- Inge Vervotte (CD&V) resigned on 2 January 2013 and was substituted by Kristof Waterschoot (CD&V).

==== 2007 ====
Results of the 2007 federal election held on 10 June 2007:

Party		Votes per arrondissement				Total votes	%	Seats
Party		Ant- werp	Mech- elen	Turn- hout	Expat- riates	Total votes	%	Seats
Christian Democratic and Flemish and New Flemish Alliance	CD&V-N-VA	145,073	68,756	113,478	251	327,558	29.28%	8
Vlaams Belang	VB	161,923	50,329	56,701	283	269,236	24.07%	6
Socialist Party Different and Spirit	SP.A-Spirit	111,376	35,282	37,835	193	184,686	16.51%	4
Open Flemish Liberals and Democrats	Open Vld	98,925	40,013	39,599	552	179,089	16.01%	4
Groen	Groen	46,147	14,145	16,270	228	76,790	6.87%	1
List Dedecker	LDD	30,004	13,940	16,586	40	60,570	5.42%	1
Workers' Party of Belgium	PVDA	10,356	2,072	2,499	28	14,955	1.34%	0
Committee for Another Policy	CAP	2,233	810	1,008	8	4,059	0.36%	0
New Party	NP-FN	867	361	372	5	1,605	0.14%	0
Valid votes		606,904	225,708	284,348	1,588	1,118,548	100.00%	24
Rejected votes		21,035	8,959	16,212	97	46,303	3.98%	
Total polled		627,939	234,667	300,560	1,685	1,164,851	91.38%	
Registered electors		695,221	256,435	320,938	2,127	1,274,721		
Turnout		90.32%	91.51%	93.65%	79.22%	91.38%		

The following candidates were elected: Meyrem Almaci (Groen), 14,628 votes; Gerolf Annemans (VB), 88,154 votes; Yolande Avontroodt (Open Vld), 13,517 votes; Alexandra Colen (VB), 20,450 votes; Rita De Bont (VB), 10,852 votes; Mia De Schamphelaere (CD&V-N-VA), 18,783 votes; Maya Detiège (SP.A-Spirit), 24,767 votes; Bart De Wever (CD&V-N-VA), 41,962 votes; Marijke Dillen (VB), 13,814 votes; Patrick Janssens (SP.A-Spirit), 37,626 votes; Jan Mortelmans (VB), 10,342 votes; Jan Peeters (SP.A-Spirit), 13,966 votes; Kris Peeters (CD&V-N-VA), 39,754 votes; Willem-Frederik Schiltz (Open Vld), 7,766 votes; Bart Somers (Open Vld), 41,974 votes; Bruno Valkeniers (VB), 14,897 votes; Christine Van Broeckhoven (SP.A-Spirit), 26,194 votes; Ludo Van Campenhout (Open Vld), 12,802 votes; Jef Van den Bergh (CD&V-N-VA), 16,749 votes; Flor Van Noppen (CD&V-N-VA), 19,268 votes; Mark Verhaegen (CD&V-N-VA), 18,721 votes; Servais Verherstraeten (CD&V-N-VA), 25,610 votes; Jurgen Verstrepen (LDD), 15,782 votes; and Inge Vervotte (CD&V-N-VA), 133,830 votes.

Substitutions:

- Marijke Dillen (VB) resigned on 19 June 2007 and was substituted by Luc Sevenhans (VB).
- Kris Peeters (CD&V-N-VA) resigned on 25 June 2007 and was substituted by Jan Jambon (CD&V-N-VA).
- Patrick Janssens (SP.A-Spirit) resigned on 26 June 2007 and was substituted by David Geerts (SP.A-Spirit).
- Jurgen Verstrepen (LDD) resigned on 27 June 2007 and was substituted by Rob Van de Velde (LDD).
- Bart De Wever (CD&V-N-VA) resigned on 30 June 2009 and was substituted by Kristof Waterschoot (CD&V-N-VA) on 2 July 2009.
- Inge Vervotte (CD&V-N-VA) was appointed to the federal government and was substituted by Luc Peetermans (CD&V-N-VA) on 27 November 2009.

==== 2003 ====
Results of the 2003 federal election held on 18 May 2003:

Party		Votes per arrondissement				Total votes	%	Seats
Party		Ant- werp	Mech- elen	Turn- hout	Expat- riates	Total votes	%	Seats
Vlaams Blok	VB	167,518	49,021	52,637	347	269,523	24.09%	7
Socialist Party Different and Spirit	SP.A-Spirit	134,999	45,687	62,979	214	243,879	21.80%	6
Flemish Liberals and Democrats	VLD	132,617	50,372	60,063	571	243,623	21.77%	6
Christian Democratic and Flemish	CD&V	92,696	50,901	76,319	211	220,127	19.67%	5
Agalev	Agalev	29,717	9,630	10,842	177	50,366	4.50%	0
New Flemish Alliance	N-VA	25,893	9,886	13,194	55	49,028	4.38%	0
Vivant	Vivant	9,999	2,739	3,341	19	16,098	1.44%	0
Liberal Appeal	LA	9,541	2,279	1,699	69	13,588	1.21%	0
RESIST	PVDA-AEL	8,010	1,273	756	20	10,059	0.90%	0
Belgische Unie – Union Belge	BUB	1,504	563	538	19	2,624	0.23%	0
Valid votes		612,494	222,351	282,368	1,702	1,118,915	100.00%	24
Rejected votes		18,221	8,540	12,755	137	39,653	3.42%	
Total polled		630,715	230,891	295,123	1,839	1,158,568	92.43%	
Registered electors		689,533	249,739	312,063	2,106	1,253,441		
Turnout		91.47%	92.45%	94.57%	87.32%	92.43%		

The following candidates were elected: Gerolf Annemans (VB), 76,829 votes; Jos Ansoms (CD&V), 21,919 votes; Yolande Avontroodt (VLD), 15,735 votes; Nancy Caslo (VB), 6,270 votes; Alexandra Colen (VB), 18,313 votes; Filip Dewinter (VB), 77,891 votes; Margriet Hermans (VLD), 20,723 votes; Patrick Janssens (SP.A-Spirit), 89,011 votes; Nahima Lanjri (CD&V), 12,303 votes; Claude Marinower (VLD), 7,899 votes; Jan Mortelmans (VB), 7,705 votes; Staf Neel (VB), 7,122 votes; Jan Peeters (SP.A-Spirit), 15,500 votes; Bart Somers (VLD), 57,812 votes; Guido Tastenhoye (VB), 6,650 votes; Anissa Temsaman (SP.A-Spirit), 9,705 votes; Kathleen Van Brempt (SP.A-Spirit), 11,577 votes; Ludo Van Campenhout (VLD), 18,599 votes; Greet van Gool (SP.A-Spirit), 12,915 votes; Marleen Vanderpoorten (VLD), 18,402 votes; Els Van Weert (SP.A-Spirit), 19,266 votes; Mark Verhaegen (CD&V), 15,942 votes; Servais Verherstraeten (CD&V), 20,976 votes; and Inge Vervotte (CD&V), 93,030 votes.

Substitutions:

- Filip Dewinter (VB) resigned on 19 May 2003 and was substituted by Luc Sevenhans (VB).
- Margriet Hermans (VLD) resigned on 23 May 2003 and was substituted by Martine Taelman (VLD).
- Marleen Vanderpoorten (VLD) resigned on 26 May 2003 and was substituted by Fons Borginon (VLD).
- Kathleen Van Brempt (SP.A-Spirit) resigned on 3 June 2003 and was substituted by Maya Detiège (SP.A-Spirit).
- Bart Somers (VLD) resigned on 26 June 2003 after he was appointed Minister-President of Flanders and was substituted by Annemie Turtelboom (VLD).
- Anissa Temsaman (SP.A-Spirit) was appointed to the federal government and was substituted by Koen T'Sijen (SP.A-Spirit) between 14 July 2003 and 25 September 2003.
- Els Van Weert (SP.A-Spirit) resigned on 5 July 2004 and was substituted by Koen T'Sijen (SP.A-Spirit) on 8 July 2004.
- Patrick Janssens (SP.A-Spirit) resigned on 6 July 2004 and was substituted by David Geerts (SP.A-Spirit) on 8 July 2004.
- Anissa Temsaman (SP.A-Spirit) resigned on 6 July 2004 and was substituted by Inga Verhaert (SP.A-Spirit) on 8 July 2004.
- Inge Vervotte (CD&V) resigned on 6 July 2004 and was substituted by Jef Van den Bergh (CD&V) on 8 July 2004.
- Jos Ansoms (CD&V) resigned on 13 January 2005 and was substituted by Katrien Schryvers (CD&V) on the same day.
