= Samyn =

Samyn is a surname. Notable people with the surname include:

- Auriea Harvey & Michael Samyn, two artists who collaborate on creating art video games
- Ellen Samyn (born 1980), Belgian-Flemish politician and MP
- Emile Samyn (born 1997), Belgian footballer
- Jean-Luc Samyn (born 1956), jockey in American Thoroughbred horse racing
- José Samyn (1946–1969), French professional road bicycle racer who died during a race in Zingem, Belgium
- Julien Samyn (1890–1968), Belgian racing cyclist
- Philippe Samyn (1948–2026), Belgian architect, civil engineer, and urbanist

== See also ==
- Le Samyn, annual single-day road bicycle race in Belgium, held usually in late February or early March
- Saman (disambiguation)
- Samian (disambiguation)
- Samin (disambiguation)
- Syman
