= Steven Vanackere =

Belgian politician

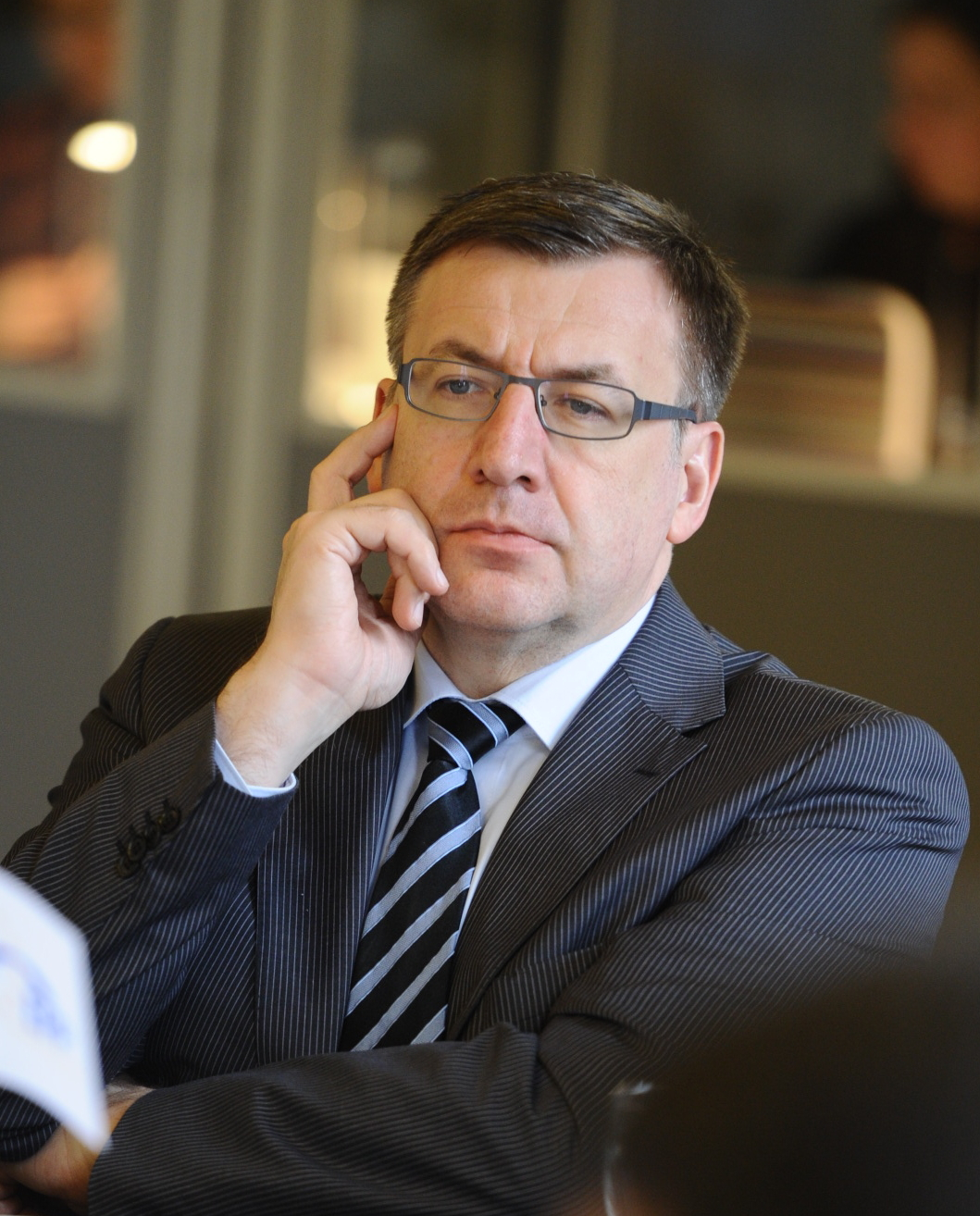

Minister of Finance
- In office 6 December 2011 – 5 March 2013
- Prime Minister: Elio Di Rupo
- Preceded by: Didier Reynders
- Succeeded by: Koen Geens

Minister of Foreign Affairs
- In office 25 November 2009 – 6 December 2011
- Prime Minister: Yves Leterme
- Preceded by: Yves Leterme
- Succeeded by: Didier Reynders

Minister of Civil Service, Public Enterprises and Institutional Reforms
- In office 30 December 2008 – 25 November 2009
- Prime Minister: Herman van Rompuy
- Preceded by: Inge Vervotte
- Succeeded by: Inge Vervotte

Minister for Welfare, Public Health and Family of Flanders
- In office 28 June 2007 – 30 December 2008
- President: Kris Peeters
- Preceded by: Inge Vervotte
- Succeeded by: Veerle Heeren

Personal details
- Born: 4 February 1964 (age 62) Wevelgem, Belgium
- Party: Christian Democratic and Flemish
- Education: Catholic University of Leuven
- Website: www.stevenvanackere.be

Steven Vanackere (Dutch: [ˈsteːvə(ɱ) vɑnˈɑkərə]; born 4 February 1964) is a Belgian politician from Flanders and member of the Christian Democratic and Flemish party (CD&V). He held the portfolios of Deputy Prime Minister of Belgium and Minister of Foreign Affairs and Institutional Reform in the Leterme II government. He is the son of Leo Vanackere, who, following a political career as a Member of the Chamber of Representatives and the Senate of Belgium, became the Provincial Governor of West Flanders in 1979. His grandfather, Remi Wallays, had also been a senator and had been a former Mayor of Wevelgem.

On 7 January 2014, CD&V designated Steven Vanackere as its third-placed candidate, behind serving MEPs Marianne Thyssen and Ivo Belet, on its list for the European Parliament elections in May 2014. It had been considered unlikely by commentators that he would accept this challenge as initially when it was offered to him in December 2013, he had indicated his disappointment and seemed set to reject it, saying this would probably mark the end of his political career, given the perceived upward struggle facing CD&V in retaining its third seat in the new post-2014-election configuration of the European Parliament, both since Belgium's Flemish parties will have one fewer seat in the new Parliament and the increase in popularity of the New Flemish Alliance (N-VA) since the previous European Parliament elections. In the end, he received 151,000 votes to his name but missed out on a European parliamentary seat and subsequently mentioned on Actua-TV that he would be happy to be coopted as a senator or as a member of the new Flemish government. He ultimately took the former route, swearing the oath as a senator on 10 July 2014. Steven Vanackere lives in Neder-Over-Heembeek Brussels).

== Academic career ==
Steven Vanackere received his secondary education at the Sint-Albertuscollege in Haasrode, run by the Carmelite Friars, where he studied Latin-Mathematics. He graduated as Master of Laws from the Katholieke Universiteit Leuven in 1987 and obtained his Master's of Economic Sciences at the same university, one year later. In 1985, Steven Vanackere passed the (Bachelor's) degree in political science. During the academic year of 1986-1987, he served as President of the Law Students’ Association and the Vlaams Rechtsgenootschap (Flemish Law Society) in Leuven.

== Professional career ==
He began his professional career with the Kredietbank (KBC) in 1987 but went on to join CEPESS, the Research Centre of the then Christian Democratic Party, CVP – PSC, in 1988, where he became Political Advisor to CVP Chairman Herman Van Rompuy. In 1991, he was appointed Deputy Head of Staff to Jos Chabert, Minister of the Brussels-Capital Region, before becoming the Minister's Head of Staff, a post he held from 1995 to 1999. He served as Director-General of the Port of Brussels from 1993 until 2000 and as Deputy Director-General of the MIVB, the Brussels Public Transport Company, from 2000 to 2005.

In 2005, Steven Vanackere and Cathy Berx, then Members of the Flemish parliament, co-authored the book “Vergrijzing en Verkleuring [Aging and Changing Racial Mix]” by former Minister-President of Flanders, Yves Leterme (Editor-in-chief Mark Van de Voorde), published by the Davidsfonds in 2005, to which he contributed on the issue of ‘aging’.

He formed part of the CD&V's Political Executive and, together with former Members of the Chamber of Representatives, Herman Van Rompuy and Greta D’hondt, and with Koen Van den Heuvel, Member of the Flemish Parliament, he wrote the CD&V's “Sociaal-Economisch Alternatief [Socio-Economic Alternative]” as a counterpoise to the “Generatiepact [Generation Pact]” of the federal purple government – Verhofstadt II (coalition of Socialist and Liberal parties).

== Parliamentary career ==
- 13 June 2004 – 28 June 2007: Became a Member of the Flemish Parliament for the electoral district of Brussels.
- 7 June 2009 - 13 June 2010: Elected to the Brussels Parliament, but replaced by Brigitte de Pauw as a result of his ministerial responsibilities.
- Since 13 June 2010: federal representative in the Chamber of Representatives for the electoral district Brussels-Halle-Vilvoorde.

== Municipal appointments ==
Since 10 October 2006: Member of Brussels City Council

1 December 2006 - 28 June 2007: Alderman of Brussels City Council, responsible for economy and trade, the port, the procurement office and Flemish affairs. Following his ministerial appointment he has become an 'unavoidably detained' Alderman.

== Ministerial appointments ==
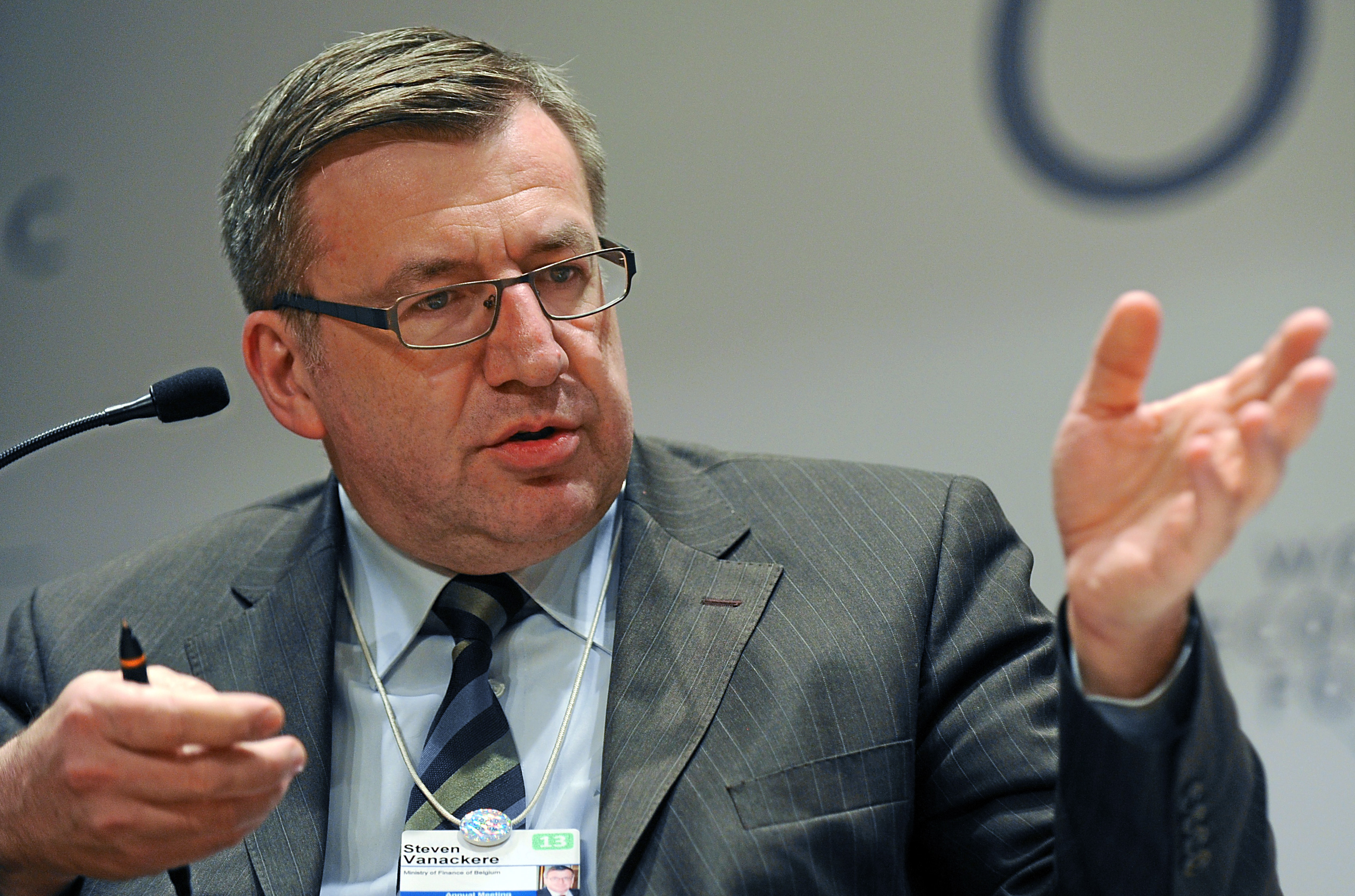
Vanackere during the WEF 2013

From 28 June 2007 to 30 December 2008 Vanackere served as Flemish Minister of Welfare, Family and Public Health in the Peeters I government.

From 30 December 2008 to 25 November 2009 Steven Vanackere served as Belgian Federal Deputy Prime Minister and Minister of the Civil Service, Public Enterprise and Institutional Reform in the Van Rompuy government.

From 25 November 2009 to 6 December 2011 Vanckere was Deputy Prime Minister and Minister of Foreign Affairs and Institutional Reform in the Leterme II government.

From 6 December 2011 Vanackere served as Deputy Prime Minister and Minister of Finance and Sustainable Development in the Di Rupo government. On 5 March 2013 he resigned from these positions after he was accused of lying to parliament about his knowledge regarding the financial agreements between the Algemeen Christelijk Werknemersverbond and Belfius. He was succeeded as Deputy Prime Minister by Minister of Defence Pieter De Crem and as Minister of Finance by Koen Geens.

Political offices
Preceded by Inge Vervotte	Minister for Welfare, Public Health and Family of Flanders; 2007–2008	Succeeded by Veerle Heeren
Preceded by Inge Vervotte	Minister of Civil Service, Public Enterprises and Institutional Reforms; 2008–2009	Succeeded by Inge Vervotte
Preceded by Yves Leterme	Minister of Foreign Affairs; 2009–2011	Succeeded by Didier Reynders
Preceded by Didier Reynders	Minister of Finance; 2011–2013	Succeeded by Koen Geens
Diplomatic posts
Preceded by Miguel Ángel Moratinos	President of the Council of the European Union; 2010	Succeeded by János Martonyi
