= Achraf El Yakhloufi =

Belgian politician (born 1998)

Member of the Chamber of Representatives
- Incumbent
- Assumed office 5 December 2024
- Preceded by: Jinnih Beels
- Constituency: Antwerp

Personal details
- Born: 26 July 1998 (age 27) Turnhout, Belgium
- Party: Vooruit

Achraf El Yakhloufi (born 26 July 1998) is a Belgian politician and member of the Chamber of Representatives. A member of Vooruit, he has represented Antwerp since December 2024.

El Yakhloufi was born on 26 July 1998 in Turnhout and is of Moroccan origin. He interrupted his SME management studies at Karel de Grote University of Applied Sciences and Arts during the COVID pandemic to start his own catering business.

El Yakhloufi was elected to the municipal council in Turnhout at the 2018 local election. In August 2019 he became leader of the Socialist Party Different (SP.A) group on the municipal council. He was re-elected at the 2024 local election. He contested the 2024 federal election as Vooruit's first placed substitute candidate in Antwerp and received 4,247 preference votes. He was appointed to the Chamber of Representatives in December 2024 following the resignation of Jinnih Beels.

Electoral history of Achraf El Yakhloufi
Election	Constituency	Party	Votes	Result
2018 local	Turnhout	Socialist Party Different	324	Elected
2024 local	Turnhout	Vooruit	1,162	Elected
