= Belgian Cancer Registry Foundation =

Belgian cancer foundation

The Belgian Cancer Registry is a Belgian institution which collects epidemiological data concerning new cancer cases in Belgium.

== History ==
In 1983 a national cancer registry (Nationaal Kankerregister-NKR) was founded in Belgium. In Flanders the Flemish government sponsored from 1994 until 2005 the creation of a Flemish cancer registry by the Vlaamse Liga tegen Kanker. The Belgian Cancer Registry Foundation, a joint initiative of the national, Brussels, Flemish and Wallonian governments, was founded on 28 June 2005 and officially inaugurated on 17 May 2006 in the presence of the ministers Rudy Demotte, Catherine Fonck and Inge Vervotte. Article 39 of the Belgian law of 13 December 2006 describes in detail the organization of cancer registration in Belgium.

== See also ==
- EORTC

== Sources ==
- Kankerregistratie voor heel België (Dutch)
