= Metsu =

Metsu is a surname. Notable people with the surname include:

- Gabriël Metsu (1629–1667), Dutch painter
- Bruno Metsu (1954–2013), French footballer
- Koen Metsu (born 1981), Belgian politician
