= Karel Loos =

Belgian engineer

- Citizenship: Belgian
- Education: Karel de Grote-Hogeschool, Cranfield University
- Occupation: Engineer
- Employer: Alpine F1 Team
- Title: Head of Trackside Engineering

Karel Loos is a Belgian Formula One and motorsports engineer. He is the Head of Trackside Engineering at the Alpine F1 Team.

== Career ==
Loos studied Automotive Engineering at Karel de Grote-Hogeschool before completing an MSc in Motorsport Engineering and Management at Cranfield University. He began his motorsport career in GT racing, working as a data and race engineer in Belcar and Group GT1 competition between 2008 and 2011. During this period he gained experience in performance analysis, vehicle dynamics, and race operations, including work on the Chevrolet Corvette C6.R programme.

Loos joined the Lotus F1 Team in late 2011 as a Graduate Vehicle Performance Engineer. He progressed through the vehicle performance group during the Lotus era, contributing to simulation correlation, car set-up development, and trackside analysis before moving into a full-time trackside role. In 2015 he became Performance Engineer to Pastor Maldonado, responsible for optimising car performance and managing set-up throughout race events. He continued in this capacity when the team became Renault F1 Team in 2016, working with Kevin Magnussen.

During 2017, Loos initially served as Performance Engineer to Jolyon Palmer before being promoted in May to Race Engineer, continuing with Palmer and subsequently working with Carlos Sainz following the Spaniard's arrival. He remained Sainz's Race Engineer throughout 2018, and then held the same role for Daniel Ricciardo from 2019 to 2020, overseeing car performance and race execution during Renault's return to competitiveness. He continued as a race engineer when the team rebranded as the Alpine F1 Team, working with Fernando Alonso across 2021 and 2022 during the Spaniard's return to Formula One. In 2023 he was paired with Pierre Gasly.

Loos was promoted to Deputy Head of Trackside Engineering for the 2024 season, and subsequently to Head of Trackside Engineering from January 2025, where he is responsible for overseeing race engineering operations, performance execution at events, and the interface between the factory and circuit-based teams.
