= Michael Freilich (politician) =

Belgian politician (born 1980)

Member of the Chamber of Representatives
- Incumbent
- Assumed office 26 May 2019

Personal details
- Born: 1980 (age 45–46) Antwerp
- Citizenship: Belgium
- Party: New Flemish Alliance (N-VA)

Michael Freilich (born 1980 in Antwerp) is a Belgian journalist and politician for the Flemish nationalist and conservative New Flemish Alliance party. He was elected to the Belgian Chamber of Representatives in 2019.

== Biography ==
Michael Freilich was born in Antwerp in 1980, to a British born father and a Belgian mother. He is the grandson of a Holocaust survivor who escaped transportation from Mechelen to Auschwitz. Freilich studied Business Administration and Communication at universities in Israel and the United States before returning to Belgium to begin a career in journalism. He served as editor-in-chief of the magazine Joods Actueel and established himself as a spokesman for Antwerp's Jewish community.

Freilich is a practicing Orthodox Jew, making him the first Orthodox Jewish politician to be elected to the Chamber of Representatives. He is married with four children.

Freilich was elected to the Belgian Chamber of Representatives on the N-VA's list in the 2019 federal elections for the seat of Antwerp and received nearly 13,000 preference votes.

He has stated that the main concerns that prompted him to get involved in politics were immigration, extremism and terrorism. He has cited his opposition to the UN Global Compact on Migration, arguing "the chaos with uncontrolled migration is no longer possible" and instead advocating for a points based migration system similar to the Canadian model. He has described his and the N-VA's philosophy as valuing "Enlightenment in a common Judeo-Christian tradition without imposing obligations on others.”

In 2019, Flemish newspaper editor Bart Eeckhout accused Freilich of working as a spy for the Israeli government in the Belgian parliament. Eeckhout made the accusation in an article for the centre-left newspaper De Morgen after Freilich attended a debate with pro-Palestinian activists along with other members of the Federal Parliament and allegedly asked his parliamentary aide to film the exchange. A parliamentary conduct panel concluded that Freilich had no right to film the encounter, but cleared him of any wrongdoing. The allegations were strongly denied by Freilich, who said it “boggles the mind” and is “Dreyfus mentality on the eve of 2020.” He furthermore stated that he took the videos to share on social media and pointed out that Eeckhout had previously been involved in antisemitic controversies. He got elected with 12,829 preferential votes and the N-VA won 24 seats, making it the largest group. Freilich thus became the first Modern Orthodox Jew in the House of Representatives. In 2023, Freilich referred to the October 7 attack on Israel as "Israel's 9/11" and expressed concern that the war will lead to a sectarian conflict between Jews and Muslims in Belgium. He also criticised what he argued is the "one-sided view of the conflict" of the Western press, citing inaccurate reporting by The New York Times and argued "if you do not eliminate Hamas now, Israel will perish. Because Hamas will always go one step further. The next step may be a chemical attack. Hamas can do that, with the help of Iran. By the way, it is the position of the European Union that Israel has the right to eliminate Hamas. I am not going to oppose that."
