= Bruno Valkeniers =

Belgian right-wing politician

Leader of Vlaams Belang
- In office 2 March 2008 – 16 December 2012
- Preceded by: Frank Vanhecke
- Succeeded by: Gerolf Annemans

Member of the Chamber of Representatives
- In office 10 June 2007 – 25 May 2014
- Constituency: Antwerp

Personal details
- Born: 13 June 1955 (age 71) Brussels, Belgium
- Party: Vlaams Belang (2004–present)
- Other political affiliations: Vlaams Blok (1983–2004)
- Education: University of Antwerp
- Occupation: Businessman • Politician

Bruno Lodewijk Juliaan Ambrosius Valkeniers (born 13 June 1955) is a Flemish businessman, and since 2008 the party chairman of the political party Vlaams Belang, between 2008 and 2012.

Before entering active politics, Valkeniers worked in the maritime and port business for 26 years, as director of a global port operator and as the CEO of a maritime consulting company. He was elected member of the Antwerp provincial council in 2006, and member of the Belgian parliament in 2007. In 2008, he was chosen as new party chairman for the Vlaams Belang as the successor to Frank Vanhecke, having contested the position unopposed.
