= Tine Gielis =

Belgian politician (born 1967)

Member of the Chamber of Representatives
- Incumbent
- Assumed office 10 July 2024
- Constituency: Antwerp

Personal details
- Born: 16 August 1967 (age 58)
- Party: Christian Democratic and Flemish

Tine Gielis (born 16 August 1967) is a Belgian politician serving as a member of the Chamber of Representatives since 2024. She has served as mayor of Laakdal since 2007.
