= Oskar Seuntjens =

Belgian politician (born 1998)

Member of the Chamber of Representatives
- Incumbent
- Assumed office 9 June 2024
- Constituency: Antwerp

Personal details
- Born: 3 September 1998 (age 28) Wilrijk, Belgium
- Party: Vooruit
- Parent: Inga Verhaert
- Education: University of Antwerp

Oskar H. F. Seuntjens (born 3 September 1998) is a Belgian politician and member of the Chamber of Representatives. A member of Vooruit, he has represented Antwerp since June 2024.

Seuntjens was born on 3 September 1998 in Wilrijk. He is the son of former MP Inga Verhaert and Filip Seuntjens. He grew up in Kalmthout and was educated at the Erasmusatheneum Kalmthout. He played football at Kalmthout SK and Kapellen. He received an engineering degree from the University of Antwerp in 2020. He is currently studying sustainability in school buildings for his doctorate at the university. He currently lives in Antwerp.

Seuntjens was chairman of Jongsocialisten, Vooruit's youth wing. He was elected to the Chamber of Representatives at the 2024 federal election, receiving 6,826 preference votes.
