= Greet Daems =

Belgian politician (born 1980)

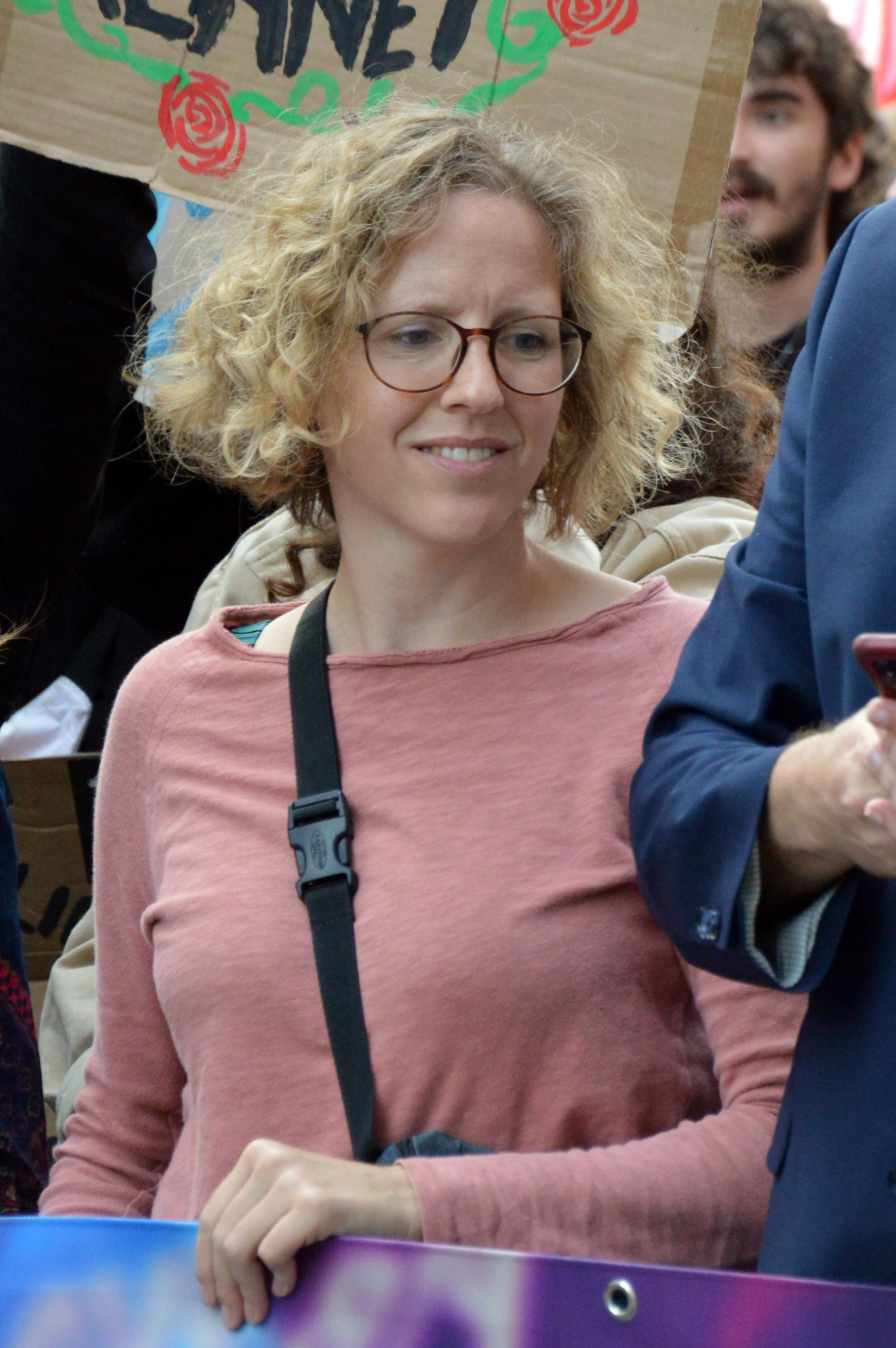
- Daems in October 2021

Member of the Chamber of Representatives
- Incumbent
- Assumed office 20 June 2019
- Constituency: Antwerp

Personal details
- Born: 11 September 1980 (age 45) Lier, Belgium
- Party: Workers' Party of Belgium

Greet Daems (born 11 September 1980) is a Belgian trade unionist, politician and member of the Chamber of Representatives. A member of the Workers' Party of Belgium, she has represented Antwerp since June 2019.

Daems was born on 11 September 1980 in Lier. She worked in the further education sector in Antwerp for 14 years, teaching Dutch to non-native speakers. She was a trade union representative for the General Union of Public Services (ACOD). She is active in the Islands of Peace (Vredeseilanden) and Hart boven Hard NGOs as well as the scouts.

Daems was elected to the municipal council in Geel at the 2018 local election. She was elected to the Chamber of Representatives at the 2019 federal election. She was re-elected at the 2024 federal election.

Daems has two daughters and lives in Geel.

Electoral history of Greet Daems
Election	Constituency	Party	Votes	Result
2018 local	Geel	Workers' Party of Belgium	717	Elected
2019 federal	Antwerp	Workers' Party of Belgium	7,268	Elected
2024 federal	Antwerp	Workers' Party of Belgium	8,522	Elected
