= Joods Actueel =

Belgian magazine focusing on the Jewish community

- Editor: Terry Davids
- Categories: Jewish community in Flanders, news, politics
- Frequency: Monthly
- First issue: January 2007
- Country: Belgium
- Language: Dutch

Joods Actueel (Jewish Current) is a monthly Dutch language, Belgian Jewish news and political magazine founded in 2007. Mainly geared towards the Jewish communities in the cities of Antwerp and Brussels, it also covers Jewish culture, religion, and history. Frequent topics include the Holocaust, the state of Israel, anti-Semitism, and the conflict in the Middle East.

Joods Actueel began in January 2007 as a successor to the magazine Belgisch-Israëlitisch Weekblad (Belgian-Israelite Weekly), founded by Louis Davids in 1954. Davids' grandson, Michael Freilich, served as its editor-in-chief until 2019, when he stepped down to pursue a career in politics. Freilich is currently serving as a member of the Belgian Parliament from the conservative, Flemish nationalist party The New Flemish Alliance (N-VA). Joods Actueel's current editor-in-chief is Terry Davids, Louis Davids daughter and Freilich's mother.

In 2008 the magazine confronted several Belgian stand-up comics and television producers for "trivialising" Adolf Hitler in a cooking show featuring his favorite dish.

In January 2026, Joods Actueel announced that they were discontinuing the print edition of the magazine and would become an online-only publication, citing financial hardship due to decreasing advertising revenue. According to Freilich, "several advertisers have dropped out because of what is happening in the Middle East."
