= Samina =

Samina may refer to:

- MS Express Samina, a ferry, built in 1966, that collided with a rock in 2000
- Mesothen samina, a moth species

== Places ==
- Samina (river), of Liechtenstein and Austria, tributary of the Ill
- Samina (Andoma), a tributary of the Andoma, Vologda Oblast, Russia
- Samina, Punjab, a town and union council in the Punjab province of Pakistan

== Other ==
- Samina (name)
