= Laakdal =

- Municipality
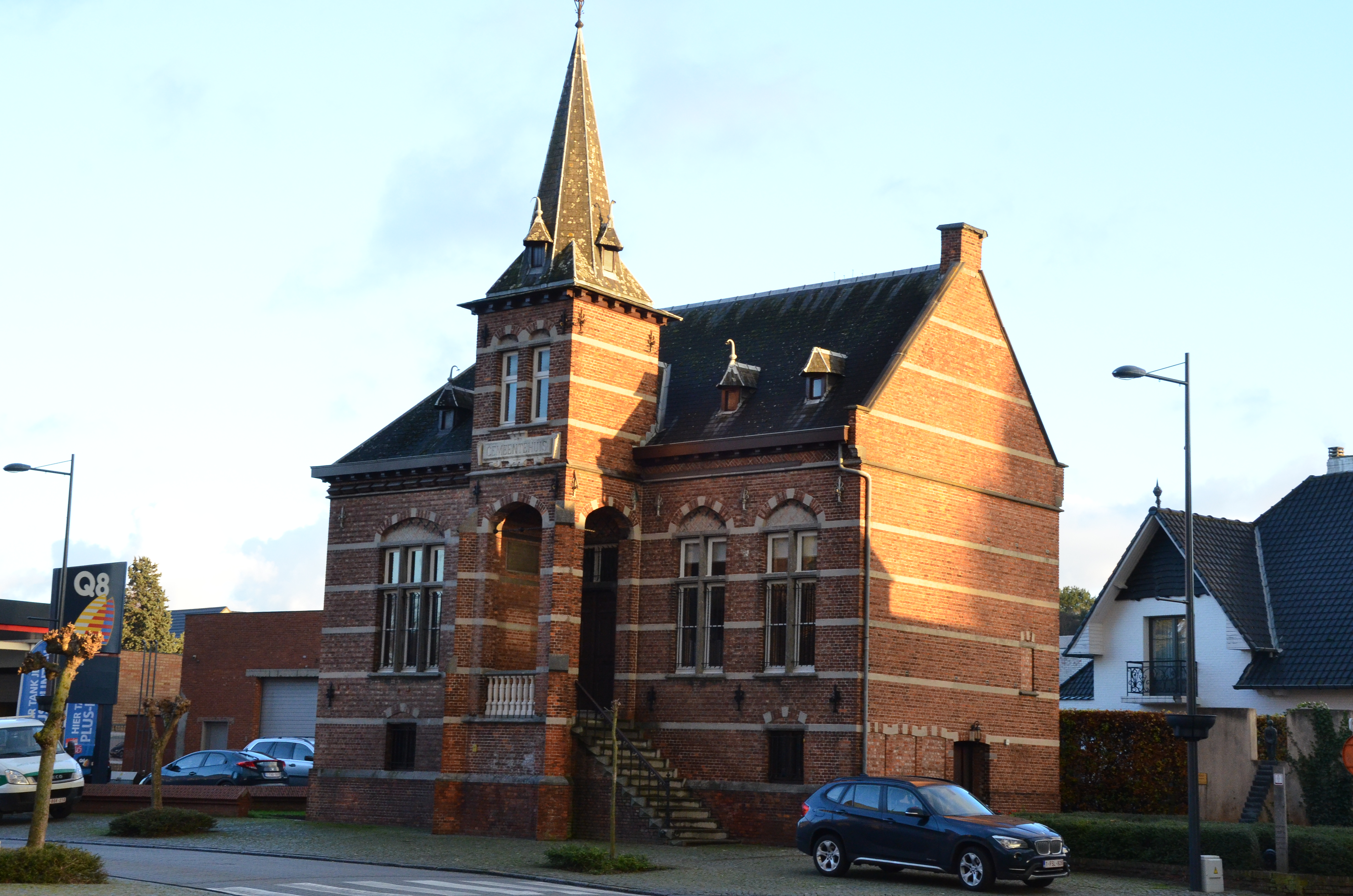
- Eindhout

- Flag Coat of arms

- Location of Laakdal in the province of Antwerp
- Interactive map of Laakdal
- Location in Belgium
- Coordinates: 51°05′N 05°04′E
- Country: Belgium
- Community: Flemish Community
- Region: Flemish Region
- Province: Antwerp
- Arrondissement: Turnhout

Government
  - Mayor: Tine Gielis (CD&V)
  - Governing parties: CD&V, PROLaakdal

Area
  - Total: 42.43 km^{2} (16.38 sq mi)

Population (2020-01-01)
  - Total: 16,186
  - Density: 381.5/km^{2} (988.0/sq mi)
- Postal codes: 2430, 2431
- NIS code: 13053
- Area codes: 014, 013, 011
- Website: www.laakdal.be

Laakdal (Dutch pronunciation: [ˈlaːɡdɑl]) is a municipality located in the Belgian province of Antwerp. Laakdal was founded in 1977 out of a merger of the towns Veerle, Eindhout and Vorst. The municipality now comprises the towns of Eindhout, Veerle, Vorst, Varendonk and Vorst-Meerlaar (also known as Klein-Vorst).

== Census ==
In 2021, Laakdal had a total population of 16,293. The total area is 42.48 km^{2}.

== Location ==
The municipality has 6 neighbouring towns. Clockwise on the compass these are: Geel, Meerhout, Ham, Tessenderlo, Scherpenheuvel-Zichem and Herselt.

== Notable people ==
- Kathleen Aerts
- Patrik Vankrunkelsven
