= Samin (name) =

Samin is a given name and surname that may refer to

== Male given name ==
- Samin Baghtcheban (1925–2008), Iranian composer
- Samin Uygun (born 1939), Turkish footballer

== Female given name ==
- Samin Gómez (born 1992), Venezuelan racing driver
- Samin Nosrat (born 1979), American chef

== Surname ==
- Xavier Samin (born 1978), Tahitian male footballer

== See also ==
- Samin (disambiguation)
- Samina (name)
