= Rita Bellens =

Belgian politician

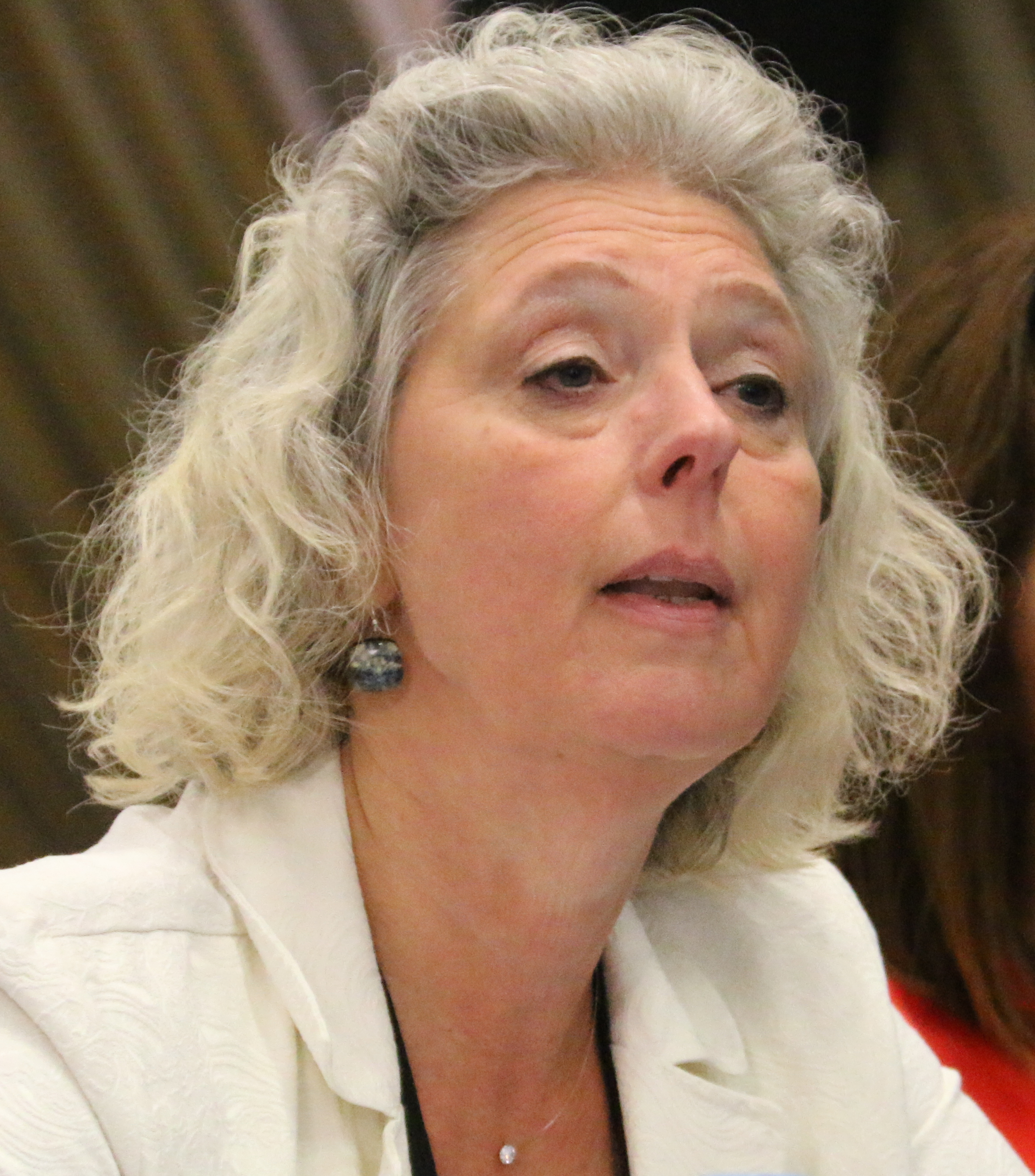
- Bellens in 2016

Member of the Chamber of Representatives of Belgium
- In office 2014–2019

Personal details
- Born: September 29, 1962 (age 63) Antwerp
- Party: New Flemish Alliance

Rita Bellens (born 29 September 1962, in Antwerp) is a Belgian politician and member of the New Flemish Alliance. She was a member of the Chamber of Representatives for Antwerp from 2014 to 2019, alderman of Duffel from 2015 to 2019, and has been chairman of the city council since January 2019.
