= Samina (name) =

Samina is a feminine given name that may derive from Arabic or Hebrew. The Hebrew derivation has numerous variants and is popular in Scandinavian countries.

== Politicians ==
- Samina Abid, Pakistani politician
- Samina Khalid Ghurki (born 1956), Pakistani politician
- Samina Khan (born 1970), Pakistani politician
- Samina Matloob, Pakistani politician
- Samina Noor (born 1986), Pakistani politician
- Samina Mushtaq Pagganwala, Pakistani politician

== Art and literature ==
- Samina Ahmad (born 1950), Pakistani actress, director and producer
- Samina Ali, American author
- Samina Awan (born 1985), British actress
- Samina Chowdhury, Bangladeshi singer
- Samina Peerzada (born 1955), Pakistani actress, director and producer
- Samina Quraeshi (1944–2013), American writer
- Samina Raja (1961–2012), Pakistani poet
- Samina Humayun Saeed, Pakistani producer
- Samina Syed (1944–2016), Pakistani singer

== Other ==
- Samina Baig (born 1990), Pakistani mountaineer
- Samina Malik, British terrorist
- Samina Yasmeen, Australian academic

== See also ==
- Samina (disambiguation)
- Samin (name)
