= Lode Vereeck =

Belgian economist, professor and politician (born 1965)

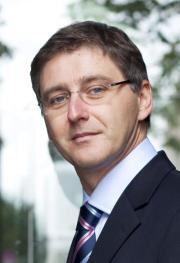

Member of the Chamber of Representatives
- Incumbent
- Assumed office 2024

Member of the Flemish Parliament
- In office 2009–2014

Member of the Belgian Senate
- In office 2014–2019

Personal details
- Born: Lode Vereeck; 23 January 1965 (age 61) Deurne, Belgium
- Party: Vlaams Belang (2020-present)
- Other political affiliations: Open VLD (2000-2009, 2014); Lijst Dedecker (2009-2014)
- Education: University of Antwerp; Maastricht University

Lode Vereeck (born 23 January 1965) is a Belgian economist, professor and politician of the Vlaams Belang party, and formerly of the Open VLD and Lijst Dedecker.

Vereeck worked as a professor of macroeconomics in Belgium, the Netherlands and Argentina before serving as an economics advisor to the Flemish government and was later elected to the Flemish Parliament and the Belgian Senate. In 2024, he was elected to the Belgian Chamber of Representatives.

== Biography ==
=== Early life and education ===
Vereeck was born in Deurne and raised in Antwerp where his father worked as a school teacher. He attended the University of Antwerp where he completed a bachelor's degree in international relations and economics before obtaining a PhD at Maastricht University in the Netherlands in economics.

=== Academic career ===
Vereeck worked as an assistant professor at the University of Antwerp teaching macroeconomics from 1987 to 1992 and then worked as a professor of legal economics at the Torcuato di Tella University faculty of law in Buenos Aires. From 1992 to 2004 he also taught legal and tax economics at Faculty of Law of Maastricht University. In 2009, he took up a part-time teaching and research scholar post at Hasselt University in public finance.

== Political career ==
Vereeck joined the Open VLD party in 2000 and worked as a policy advisor to Flemish minister Jaak Gabriëls on the areas of employment and social security. He also advised the Flemish government on administrative simplification. In 2008, he left the Open VLD and joined the new LDD party founded by Jean-Marie Dedecker. It was announced that Vereeck would be the LDD's lead candidate for the Limburg constituency in the Flemish Parliament for the 2009 Belgian regional elections. He was elected and served as a member of the finance and budget committee in the Flemish Parliament. In March 2014, he was named "Best Politician" in the Flemish Parliament by the De Standaard and De Morgen newspapers. As an opposition politician in the Flemish Parliament, he successfully tabled a motion against proposed laws to increase taxes levied on the distribution of real estate. In 2014, he briefly rejoined the Open VLD and served as a co-opted Senator in the Belgian Senate.

In 2020, Vereeck joined the Vlaams Belang and worked as a policy officer for the VB in the European Parliament and later for the party's scientific institute. In 2023, he was nominated as the party's lead candidate for the Antwerp constituency for the 2024 Belgian federal election.

== Controversy ==
In 2018, it was reported Hasselt University had started an investigation into Vereeck over possible inappropriate behaviour towards female students. The university board also dismissed Vereeck due to a breach of trust with the management and the students. Vereeck responded by claiming the accusations were a political smear campaign and pointed out that no official complaints had been filed by any students. In 2019, the Belgian Public Prosecution Service dismissed the investigation due to a lack of evidence.

== Personal life ==
Vereeck met his wife at the University of Antwerp. They married in 1990 and have a daughter.
