= Sam van Rooy =

Belgian politician

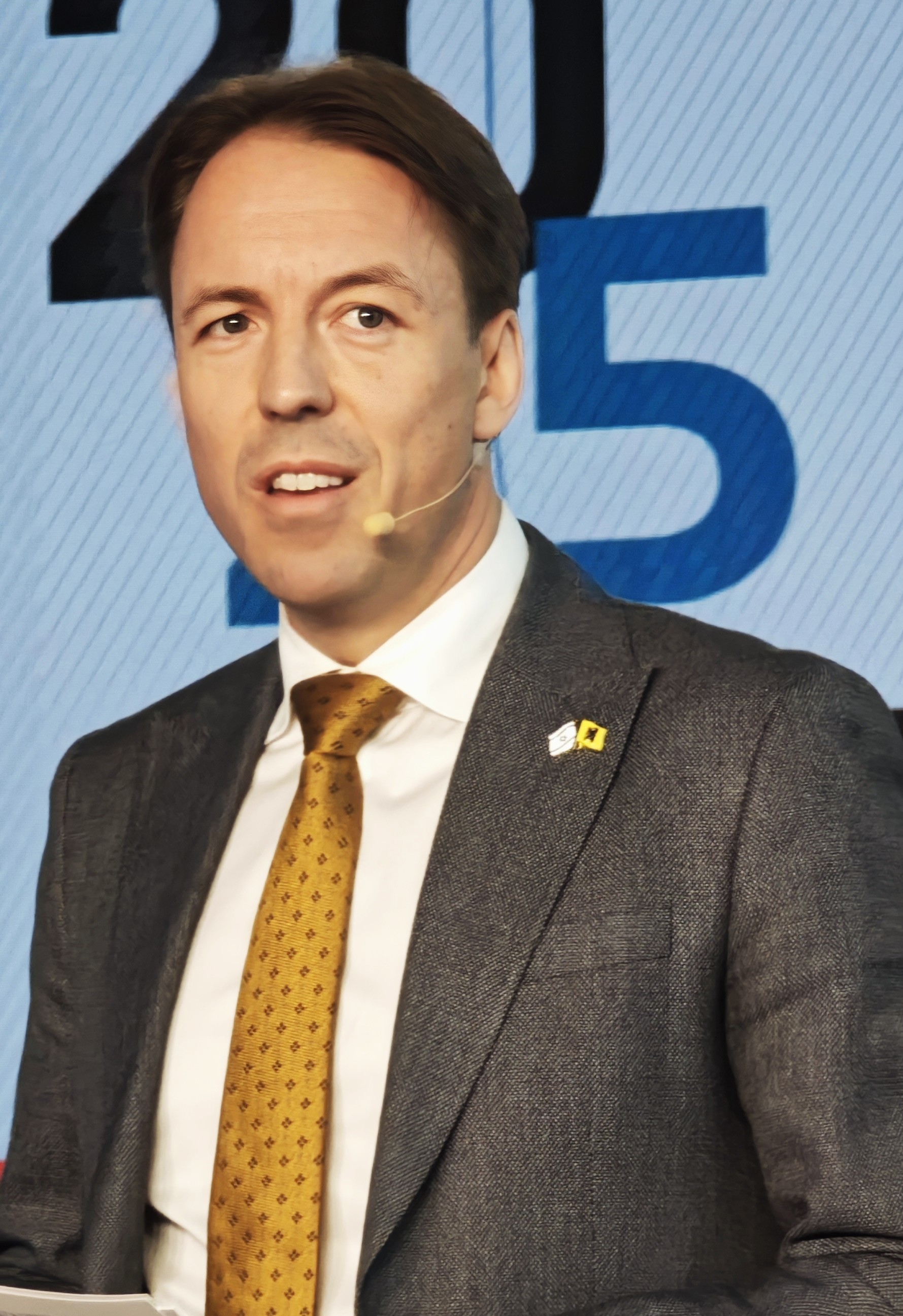
- van Rooy in 2025

Member of the Chamber of Representatives
- Incumbent
- Assumed office 9 June 2024

Member of the Flemish Parliament
- In office 26 May 2014 – 9 June 2024

Personal details
- Born: Sam van Rooy; 27 May 1985 (age 41) Antwerp, Belgium
- Party: Vlaams Belang (2012-present)
- Other political affiliations: Party for Freedom (2011) (affiliated non-member)
- Education: University of Hasselt

Sam van Rooy (born 27 May 1985, in Antwerp) is a Belgian politician for Vlaams Belang, author, blogger and former professional cyclist.

He was a member of the Flemish Parliament from 2014 to 2024, and currently serves as a deputy in the Belgian Chamber of Representatives.

== Biography ==
=== Life and politics ===
Van Rooy was born in Antwerp in 1985. He is the son of Flemish writer and philosopher Wim van Rooy. He obtained a degree in engineering from the University of Antwerp in 2007 and worked as an industrial safety manager after graduating. He was also a professional cyclist from 2001 to 2006 and raced with the Flemish youth team. In 2015, he stated that his partner is a Belgian woman of Iranian origin.

Van Rooy became politically active working for Paul Beliën and then 2011 lived and worked in the Netherlands as a policy director for Geert Wilders and the Party for Freedom party. Van Rooy joined Vlaams Belang in 2012 and became a press spokesman for the party. In 2012 he participated in the international counter-jihad conference in Brussels, billed as the "International Conference for Free Speech & Human Rights". In 2019, he was elected as a councilor in Antwerp and succeeded Filip Dewinter as the Vlaams Belang group leader in the Antwerp city council. The same year he was also elected to the Flemish Parliament. For the 2024 Belgian federal election, Van Rooy stood as a candidate for the Chamber of Representatives and was elected for the Antwerp constituency.

=== Written work ===
Van Rooy is active as an author. At the age of twelve wrote two children's books which were published before publishing books on cycling. He has since written several political books, mainly concerning the European Union and Islam. Van Rooy is also publicist and writer on the Flemish blog site Doorbraak. He is noted for his activities on social media and according to research by Het Laatste Nieuws was the "most shared Flemish Twitter user" in 2019.

=== Controversies ===
While living in the Netherlands, Van Rooy uploaded a video on Facebook of several women wearing burqas outside of a shopping centre in Scheveningen labelling the women "scum" in the video's description. When asked in the comments section why he had called them scum, he responded with "What nonsense that you can't call people scum" and "people who reject Western values in favor of a racist, fascist and inhumane system like Sharia are just scum, just like Nazis and other fascists." In response, Geert Wilders later dismissed him from his role as a director for the Party for Freedom. Controversy around the video resurfaced in 2015 after Van Rooy was elected to the Flemish Parliament. In response, Van Rooy partly distanced himself from his actions and claimed on his blog that "I labelled the burqas as scum, which – admittedly – was a bit simplistic because I could not know whether the people involved had chosen the burqa entirely of their own accord."

Following the Fall of Kabul to the Taliban in 2021, Van Rooy posted on Twitter "Someone once told me that Afghanistan can only become a flourishing, free society if 70 percent of the male Muslims are exterminated (because they are essentially no better than the Taliban)." In response, the Flemish human rights group All Important filed a complaint with Belgian Centre for Equal Opportunities and Opposition to Racism and called for the suspension of his parliamentary immunity by claiming that Van Rooy was "encouraging a genocide of the Afghan people." Van Rooy dismissed the accusation and claimed his tweet was referring to a quote from a discussion with a Belgian historian who had told him "the majority of Afghan Muslim men hold the same ideas as the Taliban, especially about women."

== Works ==
- 2010 - Cycling Dictionary (Atlas-Contact, together with Wim van Rooy and Fons Leroy)
- 2010 - Islam. Critical essays on a political religion (ASP Editions, together with Wim van Rooy)
- 2012 - Europe staggers. The kidnapping of Europe by the EU (Van Halewyck, together with Wim van Rooy and Remi Hauman)
- 2016 - Why do they hate us anyway? (The Blue Tiger, together with Frits Bosch, Paul Cliteur and Wim van Rooy, among others)
- 2018 - So for freedom against Islamization (Breakthrough)
