= Marijke Dillen =

Belgian politician and lawyer

Member of the Chamber of Representatives
- Incumbent
- Assumed office 2019

Member of the Chamber of Representatives
- In office 1991–1995

Member of the Flemish Parliament
- In office 1995–2014

Personal details
- Born: Marijke Elisabeth Rudolf Dillen; 11 December 1960 (age 64) Mortsel, Belgium
- Political party: Vlaams Belang (2004-present); Vlaams Blok (1989-2004)

Marijke Elisabeth Rudolf Dillen (born 11 December 1960) is a Belgian politician and lawyer who serves as a member of the Chamber of Representatives for Vlaams Belang.

== Biography ==
She is the daughter of Karel Dillen, the founder of the Vlaams Blok, while her godfather was Flemish author Wies Moens. In 1978 she graduated with a degree in Latin Greek humanities from the Onze-Lieve-Vrouw Institute in Antwerp before obtaining a master's degree in law from UFSIA in 1983. She then registered as a lawyer at the Antwerp Bar.

Dillen became active in the former Vlaams Blok and was elected as an MP for the party in the Chamber of Representatives in 1991. During the first ever Flemish Parliament elections in 1995, she was elected for the Antwerp constituency for Vlaams Blok, and then subsequently Vlaams Belang after Vlaams Blok was dissolved before resigning in 2014 and giving her seat to Jan Penris. During the 2019 Belgian federal election, Dillen was returned to the Chamber of Representatives on the Antwerp constituency list.
