= Wim Van der Donckt =

Belgian lawyer and politician (born 1965)

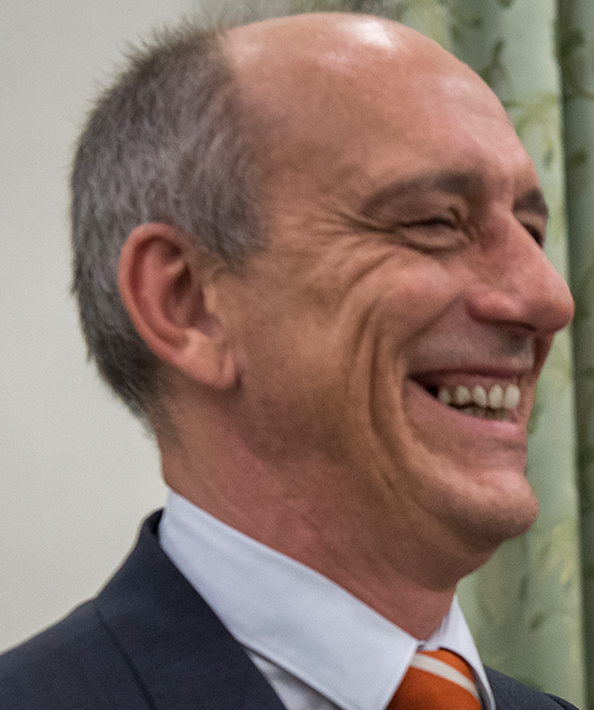
Van der Donckt in 2017

Wim Van der Donckt (born Oudenaarde, June 6, 1965) is a Belgian-Flemish lawyer and politician for the New Flemish Alliance (N-VA) party.

== Biography ==
Van der Donckt graduated with a law degree from KU Leuven. In 1995 he co-founded a law firm in Lier and in 2000 he became a deputy judge at the Mechelen Police Court. From 2002 to 2016 he was a member of the Council of the Order of the Bar of Mechelen, of which he was secretary, and from 2016 to 2017 he was also a member of the High Council of Justice (Belgium).

From 2015 to 2017, he was chairman of the N-VA branch of the district of Mechelen and he also became a member of the party's national party council. In the 2014 Belgian federal elections, he stood in third place on N-VA Chamber list for the province of Antwerp. In March 2017, he became a member of the Chamber of Representatives replacing Zuhal Demir, who became State Secretary in the Michel I Government. In 2019, he returned to the Chamber to replace Jan Jambon who resigned to become Minister-President of Flanders.
