= Mireille Colson =

Belgian politician

- Incumbent
- Assumed office 9 June 2024
- Preceded by: Eliane Tillieux

Member of the Chamber of Representatives

Personal details
- Born: Mireille Colson; 16 December 1977 (age 48) Leuven, Belgium
- Party: New Flemish Alliance
- Education: KU Leuven

Mireille Colson (born December 16, 1977, in Leuven) is a Belgian politician of the New Flemish Alliance party who has served as a deputy in the Belgian Chamber of Representatives since 2024 for the Antwerp constituency.

== Biography ==
Colson graduated with a degree in languages from KU Leuven followed by a master's degree in English-Italian-Dutch translation. She worked as a secondary school languages teacher before working in the advertising department for the company Vink in Antwerp. She later joined the chemical company Lubrizol working in the public relations department.

She first became active in the New Flemish Alliance in 2011 and was elected as a municipal councilor for the party in Herselt in 2013. From 2012 to 2024 she also sat on the provincial council of Antwerp and was an advisor to the N-VA's Antwerp faction on tourism, parks and recreation. During the 2024 Belgian federal election she was elected to the federal parliament representing the Antwerp constituency.
