= Reccino Van Lommel =

Belgian politician

Member of the Chamber of Representatives
- Incumbent
- Assumed office 2019

Chairman of Vlaams Belang Jongeren.
- In office 2014–2016

Municipal councilor of Turnhout
- Incumbent
- Assumed office 2012

Personal details
- Born: Reccino Van Lommel; 30 May 1986 (age 40) Turnhout, Belgium
- Party: Vlaams Belang
- Education: University of Hasselt

Reccino Van Lommel (born 30 May 1986) is a Belgian politician and a member of the Chamber of Representatives for Vlaams Belang since 2019.

== Biography ==
Van Lommel studied commercial engineering at the University of Hasselt. From 2011 to 2014 he worked as an operational director for the Columbus Steel construction company before working for a business consultancy firm.

In October 2014, Van Lommel succeeded Vlaams Belang leader Tom Van Grieken as chairman of the Vlaams Belang Jongeren - the youth wing of the VB, and performed this role until 2016. In the federal elections of 26 May 2019, Van Lommel was elected from third place on the Antwerp constituency list to the Chamber of Representatives. He serves on the Commission for the Economy, Consumer Protection and Digital Agenda and the Commission for Energy, Environment and Climate. Since 2012, Van Lommel has also served as a municipal counsellor in Turnhout.
