= Jan Penris =

Belgian politician (born 1964)

Municipal Councillor of Antwerp
- Incumbent
- Assumed office 2019

Member of the Chamber of Representatives
- In office 25 May 2014 – 5 June 2010

Member of the Flemish Parliament
- In office 25 May 2014 – May 21, 1995

Personal details
- Born: 12 January 1964 (age 62) Mortsel, Belgium
- Party: People's Union (before 1993); Vlaams Blok (1993-2004); Vlaams Belang (2004-)

Jan Penris (born 12 January 1964, Mortsel) is a Belgian politician of the Vlaams Belang party who sat as a member of the Flemish Parliament and then the Chamber of Representatives.

== Biography ==
Penris graduated in law at the University of Antwerp in 1987 and later a degree in maritime studies. He became active in the Flemish nationalist Nationalistische Studentenvereniging student group at this time and served as its president. After graduating he worked in a business capacity for the Port of Antwerp.

He was elected in the first Flemish Parliament election as part of the 1995 Belgian regional elections to represent the Antwerp district constituency. He was reelected consecutively until 2014. After the 2014 Belgian federal election, he sat as a member of the Chamber of Representatives to replace Marijke Dillen who had chosen not to take her seat. From 1993 to 2012, Penris was the party secretary of the Vlaams Belang. Penris caused some controversy when he expressed sympathy towards Vladimir Putin in 2014 and visited Crimea during the 2014 Crimean status referendum.

In February 2019, Penris issued an apology after being caught on camera swearing and making obscene gestures at Open VLD politician Carina Van Cauter during a plenary meeting in the Chamber. The following day Filip Dewinter stated Penris' behaviour was a result of alcohol-related depression. Penris decided to undergo treatment and temporarily withdrew from federal politics. He also stood down from the Chamber at the 2019 Belgian federal election. That same year he was elected as a municipal councilor in Antwerp.
