= Gerolf Annemans =

Belgian right-wing politician

Gerolf Annemans MEP
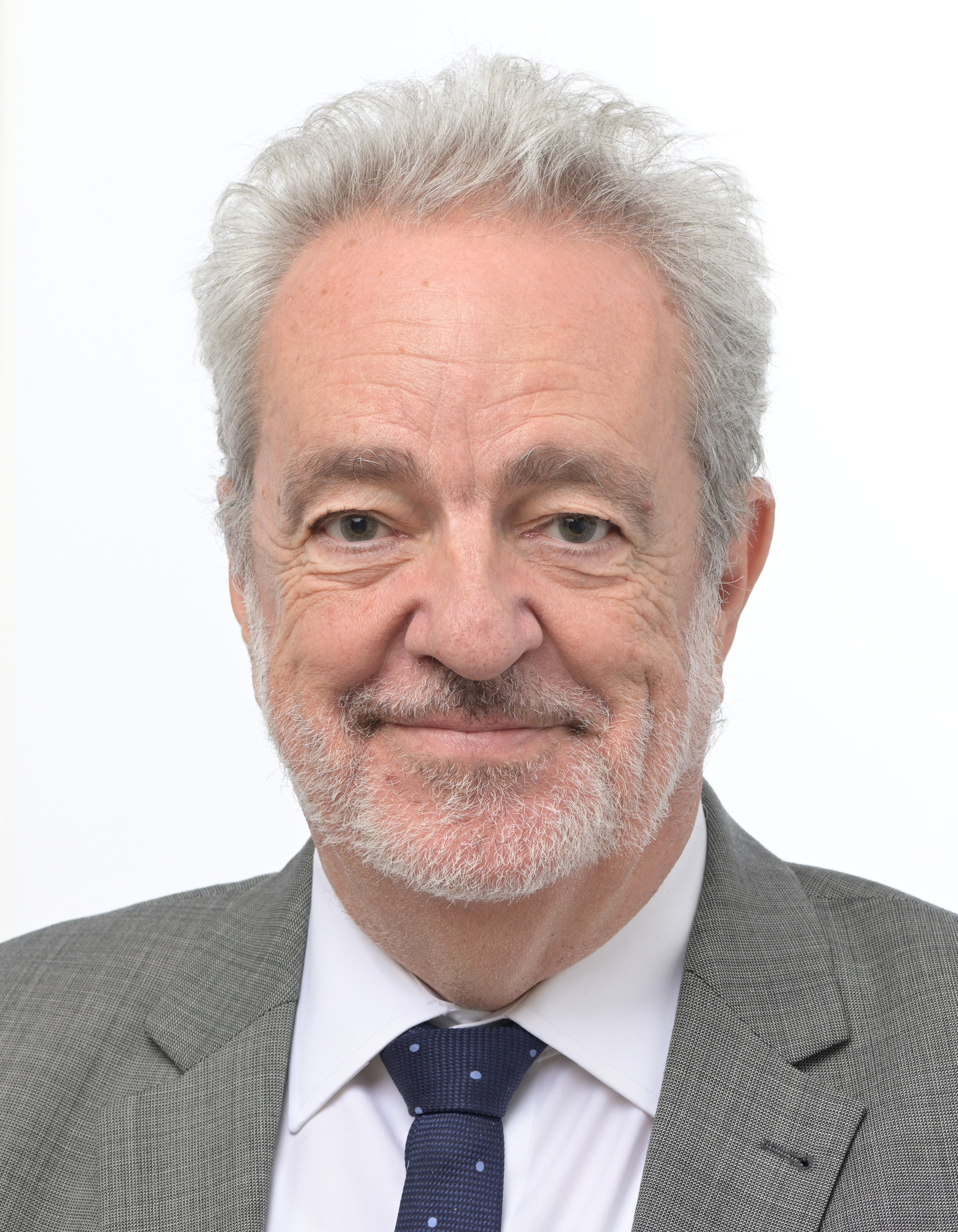
- Official portrait, 2024

Member of the European Parliament for Belgium
- Incumbent
- Assumed office 1 July 2014
- Constituency: Dutch-speaking electoral college

Leader of Vlaams Belang
- In office 16 December 2012 – 19 October 2014
- Preceded by: Bruno Valkeniers
- Succeeded by: Tom Van Grieken

Member of the Chamber of Representatives
- In office March 1987 – 28 April 2014
- Constituency: Antwerp

Personal details
- Born: Gerolf Emma Jozef Annemans; 8 November 1958 (age 67) Antwerp, Belgium
- Party: Vlaams Belang (2004–present)
- Other political affiliations: Vlaams Blok (1985–2004)
- Spouse: Monika D'hooghe
- Children: 3
- Education: University of Antwerp
- Occupation: Lawyer • Politician

Gerolf Emma Jozef Annemans (born 8 November 1958) is a Belgian lawyer, journalist and politician of the Flemish nationalist party Vlaams Belang (VB) and formerly of its predecessor, the Vlaams Blok. He has been a member of the European Parliament since 2014, and a city councilor in Antwerp since 2000. He served as a member of the Chamber of Representatives from 1987 to 2014, and as a city councilor in Brasschaat from 1994 to 2000. He was the former leader of the VB from 2012 to 2014, and led the Vlaams Blok and VB parliamentary groups from 1991 to 2013.

== Early political career ==
=== Youth and initial career ===
Annemans studied law at the University of Antwerp (UA) and graduated in 1982. He held a seat on the council of the university's law faculty and the UA governing and executive boards. He was also the chief editor of the UA-newspaper and presidium member of Sofia, the guild of the Antwerp law students. During his academic studies from 1980 to 1981, Annemans was head of the editorial staff of the students' magazine Tegenstroom, the club publication of the Katholiek Vlaams Hoogstudentenverbond (Flemish Catholic Students' Society, KVHV) society. After graduating he also contributed to several columns in the pro-Flemish conservative weekly newspaper 't Pallieterke. Annemans was briefly promoted to a chief editing position at 't Pallieterke but eventually opted for a career in politics.

=== Vlaams Blok / Vlaams Belang ===
In 1985, Gerolf Annemans became a public activist of the Vlaams Blok (renamed Vlaams Belang on 14 November 2004), as he was offered the place of first substitute on the electoral list for the Belgian federal parliament in the constituency of Antwerp. From 1987 onwards, he had a seat in that assembly, and thus was the longest established Vlaams Belang MP. Until 2013, he chaired the Vlaams Belang group. On his watch the party grew from a two member group to Belgium's third largest political faction, counting 18 members (after the 2003 Belgian federal election). Furthermore, Annemans is a longstanding member of the city council of Antwerp, a prominent on the Vlaams Belang party board and former director of the Vlaams Belang political research department.

=== A quarter-century of parliamentary opposition ===
In his parliamentary work and speeches, Annemans often mentions "the Belgian disease" (the inability of Flemings and Walloons yet to rule together efficiently). The cordon sanitaire (the unwritten agreement among all other parties not to work together with Vlaams Belang, irrespective of the number of its elected representatives) is viewed by Annemans as a problem that concerns Flanders in its entirety, due to his belief that it has been imposed on Flemish politics by an alliance of Francophone parties and their Flemish left-wing collaborators. Annemans view the party as an alternative to the moderate Flemish-regionalist N-VA, which, in his view, got entirely absorbed by Belgian power politics. Recently, Annemans did not only present himself as a member of the Flemish Movement, but also as a true republican. In doing so, he advocates thorough social reform through Flemish independence, as well as through a far-reaching transformation of the EU on the basis of the sovereignty principle.

=== Member of investigative and persecutive commissions ===
In his crusade against what he diagnoses as the "Belgian disease" (in this sense the political-administrative tangle facilitating inefficiency and corruption), he joined several parliamentary commissions for the investigation of scandals and embezzlements. In that capacity, Annemans took part in the Dutroux commission (1996), the commission investigating the "Brabant massacres" (also 1996), the Dioxin affair commission (1999), the Sabena commission (2001), and the two commissions concerning the Fortis affair (2009).

=== Annemans and Lijst Dedecker ===
After the federal elections of 10 June 2007, Annemans warned his partisans on his weblog for underestimation of the "Dedecker factor". He did not believe that the then successful Lijst Dedecker (a one man-party founded and presided by Jean-Marie Dedecker) would be a temporary hype such as the former party ROSSEM had been. According to Annemans, Dedecker had "broken the traditional monopoly of VB as the Robin Hood, the big mouth and Lucky Luke which all others fear." Moreover, the Belgian king Albert II received Jean-Marie Dedecker for his consultations following the elections, and not the then VB party chairman Frank Vanhecke. In a political talk show Annemans called it an error to exclude cooperation with Lijst Dedecker.

=== The orderly split-up of Belgium ===
In 2010, Annemans announced the publication of a new book in which he would outline a blueprint for the "active preparation of Flemish independence." The book called for Flemish independence and detailed how that would be put into effect. The fourth print of the book got outlawed in 2012 by the commercial court of Brussels. The judge ruled that the publication would have violated the rights of the British telecommunications provider O2, because the chemical symbol for oxygen (also the company's logo) figures on its cover. Furthermore, the book inspired Annemans to conceive two manifestoes that gave more depth to the Vlaams Belang platform: the Hoofdstad-Manifest on Brussels (spring 2013), and the Europa-Manifest on the EU (autumn 2013). On the topic of Flemish independence he published two follow up books: 'Quid Nunc?' (2016) and 'Momentum' in 2023.

=== Party chairman ===
On 16 December 2012, Annemans was elected chairman of the Vlaams Belang. He succeeded Bruno Valkeniers after poor election results, where the party had lost over two-thirds of its electorate in its traditional stronghold Antwerp. Annemans' chairmanship was confirmed in a secret ballot by a large majority of 92% of party members. The fresh VB foreman championed a strict migration policy and a revision of EU cooperation, but mostly focused on Flemish independence.

== Member of the European Parliament ==
For the 2014 European elections, Annemans was the leading candidate of Vlaams Belang for the European Parliament and was elected as the sole MEP of his party. Annemans would resign as party leader soon after taking office as MEP due to poor election results in the 2014 Belgian federal election, where VB lost 75% of its seats.

In his first term as a MEP, Annemans helped form the Europe of Nations and Freedom group, where he would serve as treasurer from 2015 to 2017. Throughout his first term, Annemans was a strong critic of mass immigration, saying that self interest should be at the centre of foreign policy.

In the 2019 European elections, Annemans would lead the Vlaams Belang list to come in second, only behind the New Flemish Alliance. Annemans would move to the new Identity and Democracy group. He served as President of the European political party of Identity and Democracy in that period.

For the 2024 European elections, Annemans decided not to be list leader. He was placed third on the list as Vlaams Belang won the election. Annemans would serve as treasurer of the new Patriots for Europe group.

== Private life ==
Gerolf Annemans is married and has three children. He was born in Antwerp.
