= Valerie Van Peel =

Belgian politician (born 1979)

President of the New Flemish Alliance
- Incumbent
- Assumed office 26 April 2025

Member of the Chamber of Representatives
- In office 14 October 2014 – 9 June 2024

Personal details
- Born: Valerie-Anne Van Peel; 11 October 1979 (age 46) Kalmthout, Belgium
- Citizenship: Belgium
- Party: New Flemish Alliance (N-VA)

Valerie-Anne "Valerie" Van Peel (born 11 October 1979) is a Belgian politician, journalist and former television presenter who has served as leader of the New Flemish Alliance (N-VA) party since 2025. She was a member of the Chamber of Representatives between 2014 and 2024.

== Biography ==
=== Early life and career ===
Van Peel was born in Ekeren within the Flemish region of Belgium in October 1979. After leaving school she studied communication sciences at Ghent University, followed by a postgraduate degree in journalism at the Erasmus Brussels University of Applied Sciences and Arts. She then did an internship for Rotterdam-based newspaper NRC Handelsblad before working as an editor on the VTM discussion program Recht van Antwoord (Right to Reply) in 2005. Between 2005 and 2006 she was a reporter for Het Nieuwsblad and then a political journalist for the political channel Actua TV until 2007. She was also a journalist for the women's magazine Dag Allemaal for two years.

=== Political work ===
Van Peel joined the N-VA in 2009 and worked as the faction secretary for party in the Belgian Senate from 2011 to 2012. In the municipal elections of 2012, she was elected as councilor for the N-VA in Kapellen before resigning in 2019 to focus on her parliamentary functions. In the 2014 Belgian federal election, she was elected to the Member of the Chamber of Representatives for the Antwerp constituency. In 2021, she was appointed vice-chairwoman of the N-VA.

In June 2022, Van Peel announced that she would step down as vice-chairwoman of the party and would no longer be a candidate in the June 2024 elections. She stated that her decision was motivated by her belief that it was difficult to get bills voted on from the opposition and to bring about change, because the majority parties in government would refuse to approve proposals from the opposition, even if they privately supported them, such as her bill to give better compensation to victims of asbestos poisoning.

After her political career, Van Peel became an independent consultant in communication and political strategy in 2024. Since January 2025, she has served on the board of directors for the King Baudouin Foundation.

In March 2025, Van Peel announced she would return to politics to stand in the N-VA's leadership election after Bart De Wever was appointed Prime Minister of Belgium. On April 26, 2025, she was appointed the chairwoman of the N-VA having contested the position without any opposition.

=== Views ===
Van Peel identifies as a feminist but has written in support of scrapping positive discrimination in politics.
