= Yoleen Van Camp =

Belgian politician

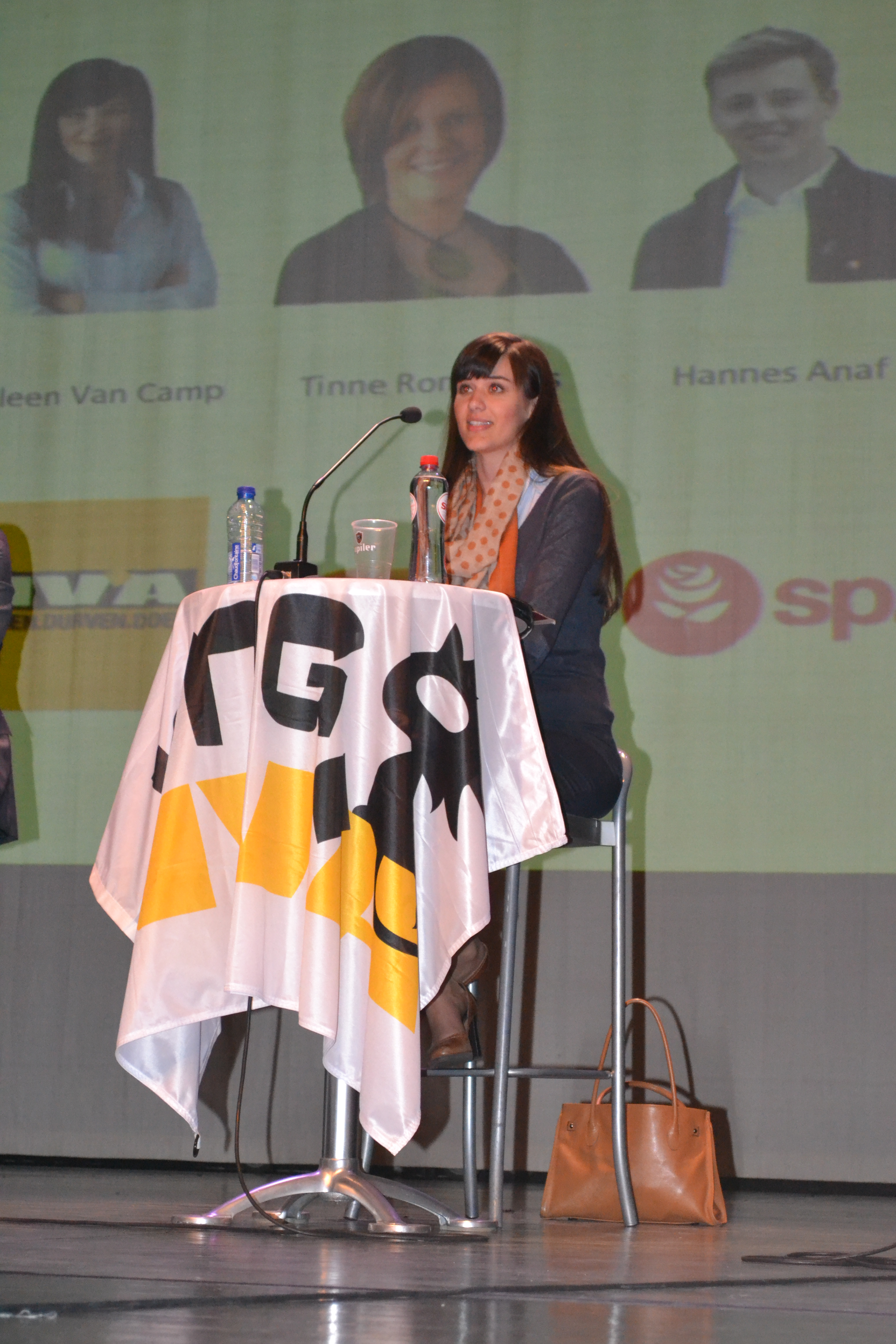

Yoleen Van Camp (born 25 August 1987 in Antwerp) is a Belgian politician and is affiliated to the New Flemish Alliance. She has been a member of the Belgian Chamber of Representatives since 2014.

== Biography ==
Van Camp obtained a high school degree (Latin-Modern Languages) in Herentals. After this, she obtained her master's degree in Nursing. Right before being elected in 2014, she gained a PhD in Medical Sciences from the University of Antwerp. She lives in Herentals.

She was elected as a local councilwoman for the town council of Kasterlee in 2012. As she moved to Herentals, she no longer holds office in Kasterlee since December 2015.

At the Belgian federal elections on 25 May 2014, Van Camp was elected for the Chamber of Representatives with a higher number of votes than she expected. She took office on 19 June 2014. She was the youngest Flemish representative. She is a member of several parliamentary committees, among which the Health, Environment and Social Innovations Committee and the Naturalization Committee.

On 11 July 2017, she caused concern by tweeting that she does not acknowledge the Belgian National Holiday as a public holiday. She considers 11 July, the non-official Flemish Region Holiday, to be her national holiday.

== Scandal ==
In Juli 2018 Yoleen caused an uproar in Herentals when her LinkedIn profile briefly contained an internal e-mail in which she disrespected several of her fellow political co-workers. She even made a comment about one co-worker with a speech impediment, saying it was exhausting communicating with him. When confronted with the e-mail Yoleen made quick accusations telling her ex-boyfriend was probably responsible, hacking her LinkedIn profile. Her boyfriend was quick to dismiss these accusations, to which Yoleen filed a complaint with the police.

In the following days several members of N-VA Herentals left or were forced to leave the party. Some of them had publicly said the accusations Yoleen made towards her ex-boyfriend were unfounded. They also blamed Yoleen for being unrespectful towards other people.to which some of the former members started a new political party, HA! (Herentals Anders / Herentals Differently).
