= Samin =

Samin may refer to the following notable subjects:

== Places ==
- Samin, Warmian-Masurian Voivodeship, Polish village in the Warmian-Masurian Voivodeship province
- Samin, Kuyavian-Pomeranian Voivodeship, Polish village in the Kuyavian-Pomeranian Voivodeship province

== People ==
- Samin (name)
- Samin people

== See also ==
- Samim (Samim Winiger), a Swiss producer of electronic dance music
