= Samian (disambiguation) =

Samian refers to something or someone from the Greek island of Samos.

Samian may also refer to:

- Samian (rapper), a Canadian hip hop musician
- Samian, Iran, a village in Ardabil Province
- Samian ware, a term used by archaeologists for Roman terra sigillata pottery produced in Gaul
- Samian, a band that Green Day drummer Tré Cool formerly played in

== See also ==
- Samian Sibyl, a priestess in Ancient Greece
- Samiam, a punk rock band
- Samos (disambiguation)
