= Dorien Cuylaerts =

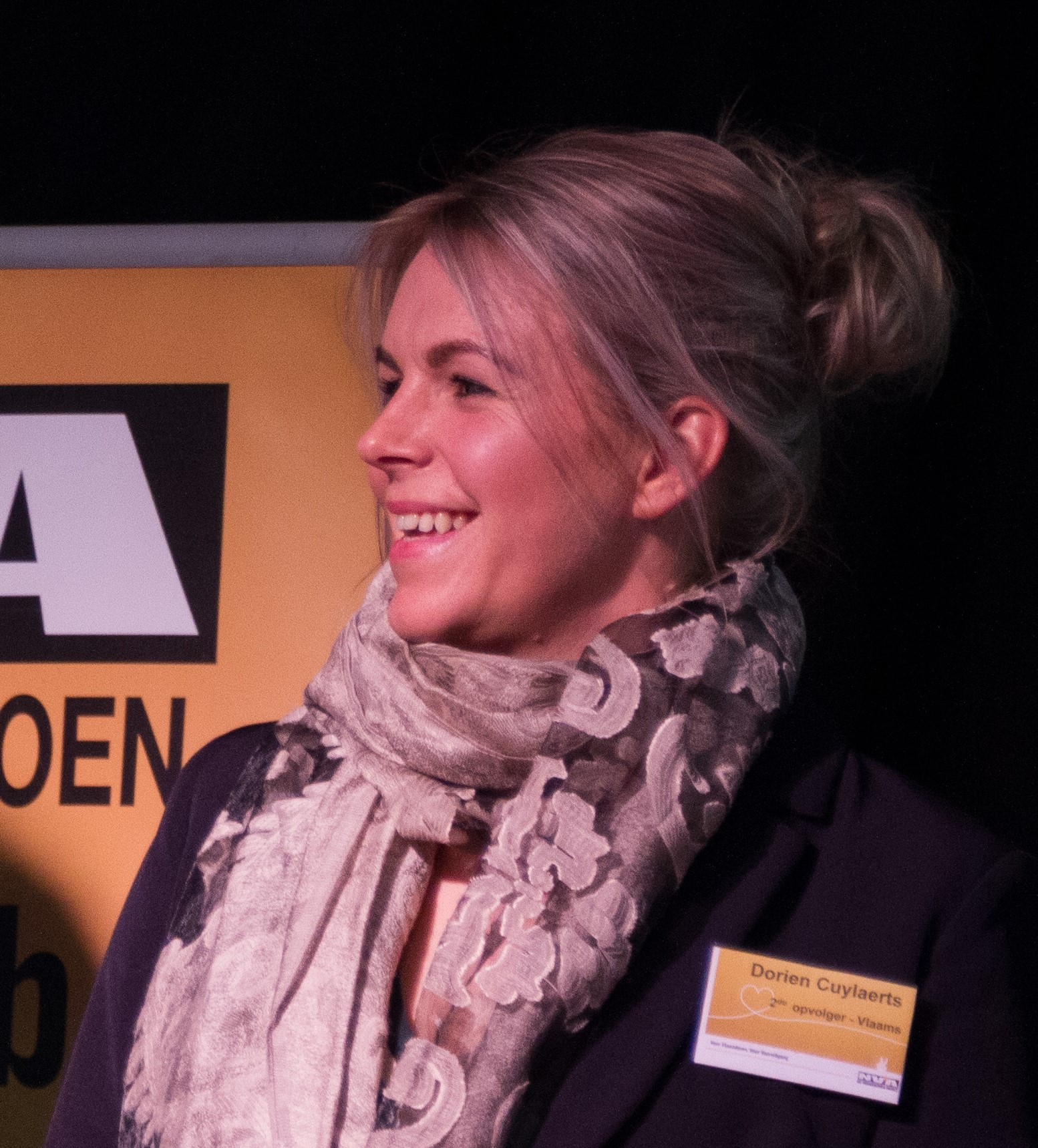
- Incumbent
- Assumed office 9 June 2024

Member of the Chamber of Representatives

Personal details
- Born: Dorien Cuylaerts; 27 September 1980 (age 45) Turnhout, Belgium
- Party: New Flemish Alliance (2011-present)
- Other political affiliations: Samen Nieuw Rijkevorsel (2006-2011)
- Education: Katholieke Hogeschool Kempen
- Occupation: Teacher, politician

Dorien Cuylaerts (born 27 September 1980 in Turnhout) is a Belgian politician of the New Flemish Alliance party who has served as a Member of the Chamber of Representatives since 2024 for the Antwerp constituency. Since 2013, she has been the mayor of Rijkevorsel.

== Biography ==
Cuylaerts was born in 1980. She gained a degree in educational studies at the Katholieke Hogeschool Kempen and worked as a secondary school computer science and physical education teacher in Antwerp.

She first entered politics when she was elected as a municipal councilor in Rijkevorsel for the localist Samen Nieuw Rijkevorsel (SNR) party in 2006. The SNR subsequently formed a coalition with the Open VLD and sp.a in 2010 with Cuylaerts being appointed an alderman and deputy mayor of Rijkevorsel and an advisor to the council on Youth, Environment, Tourism, Small Business and Equal Opportunities. She left the SNR in 2011 and founded the local branch of the N-VA. During the 2012 Belgian municipal elections, she was elected on the N-VA's list when the N-VA emerged as the largest party in Rijkevorsel and formed a coalition with the CD&V. Cuylaerts was appointed as mayor, becoming the youngest mayor in the Flemish region at the time. She held the position until 2024.

During the 2014 Belgian regional elections, she stood for the Antwerp constituency in the Flemish Parliament but was not elected. For the 2024 Belgian federal election she stood on the N-VA's list for the Antwerp region in the Federal Parliament and was elected.

Outside of politics Cuylaerts is married with three children.
