= Ellen Samyn =

Belgian politician

Member of the Chamber of Representatives
- Incumbent
- Assumed office 26 May 2019

Personal details
- Born: 23 September 1980 (age 45) Roeselare
- Party: Vlaams Belang

Ellen Samyn (born 23 September 1980) is a Belgian-Flemish politician who has served as an MP in the Chamber of Representatives for the Vlaams Belang party since May 2019.

Samyn previously worked as an assistant to Vlaams Belang politician Gerolf Annemans. From 2007 to 2018, was a member of the OCMW council of Brasschaat. In the federal elections of May 2019, Samyn was elected to the Chamber of Representatives for the Antwerp constituency. She describes herself as "EU-critical" in her beliefs.

Her husband, Dimitri Hoegaerts is a Vlaams Belang counsellor in Brasschaat since 1995.
