= Mechelen-Turnhout (Chamber of Representatives constituency) =

Belgian political subdivision

Mechelen-Turnhout was a constituency used to elect members of the Belgian Chamber of Representatives between 1995 and 2003. It was formed from a merger of Mechelen and Turnhout.

== Representatives ==
Election	Representative (Party)									
1995
1995	John Spinnewyn (VB)	Jozef Van Eetvelt (CVP)	Joos Wauters (Agalev)	Servais Verherstraeten (CVP)	Ingrid Van Kessel (CVP)	Wim Vermeulen (CVP)	Lucien Suykens (PS)	Raymond Janssens (PS)	Rony Cuyt (PS)	Willy Taelman (VLD)
1999	John Spinnewyn (VB)	Jozef Van Eetvelt (CVP)	Joos Wauters (Agalev)	Servais Verherstraeten (CVP)	Marcel Hendrickx (CVP)	Arnold Van Aperen (VLD)	Jan Peeters (PS)	Els Van Weert (VU)	Jan Mortelmans (VB)	Bart Somers (VLD)
