= Jurgen Verstrepen =

Belgian politician

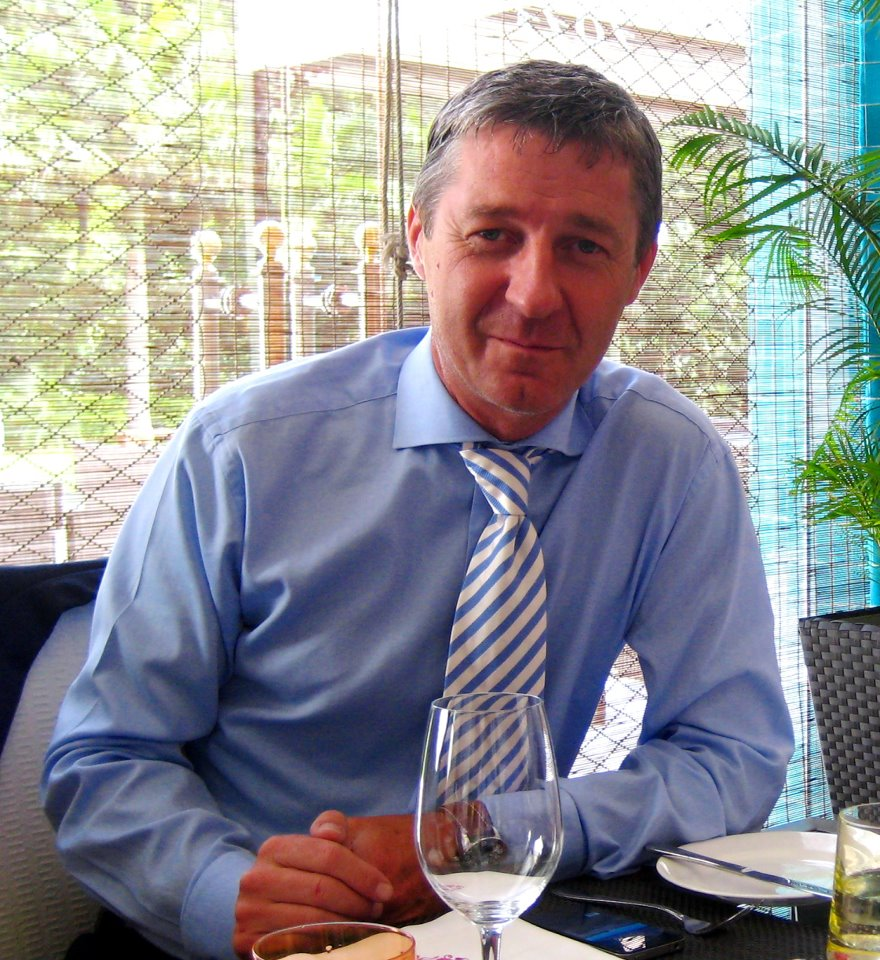
- Born: Jurgen Pierre Katharina Verstrepen; 12 June 1966 (age 59); Deurne, Belgium
- Occupations: politician, broadcaster, blogger

Jurgen Pierre Katharina Verstrepen (born 12 June 1966) is a former radio and television presenter, a member of the municipal council of Antwerp and a member of the Flemish Parliament. He lives in Wilrijk.

Elected for Vlaams Belang, Verstrepen switched sides to List Dedecker in April 2007. He completed the term as a self-proclaimed independent. In 2009 he was re-elected, this time as a candidate for List Dedecker.
