= Jinnih Beels =

Belgian politician (born 1976)

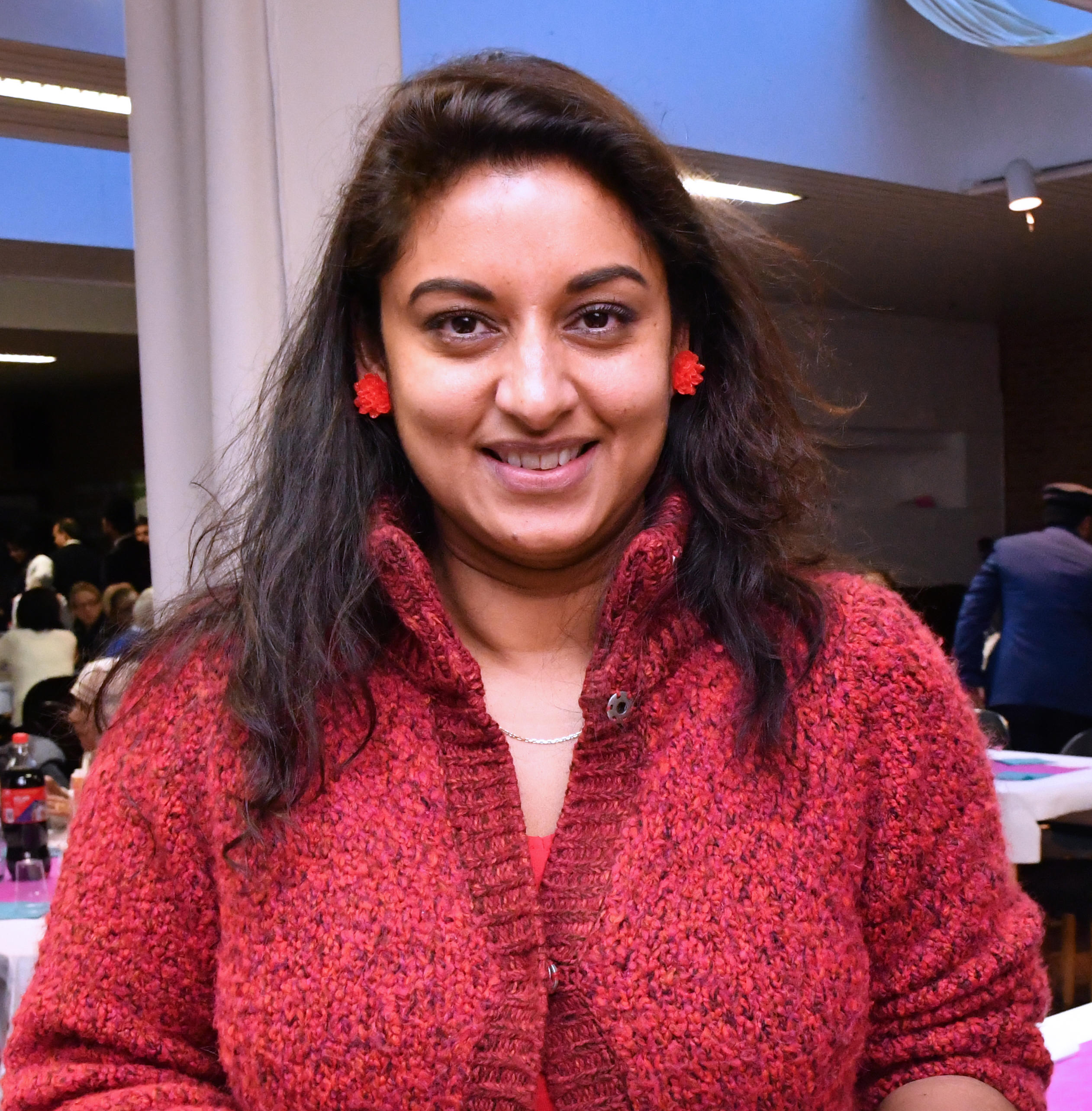

Member of the Chamber of Representatives
- Incumbent
- Assumed office 9 June 2024
- Constituency: Antwerp

Personal details
- Born: 8 October 1976 (age 49) Calcutta, India
- Party: Vooruit
- Education: KU Leuven

Jinnih Beels (born 8 October 1976) is a Belgian politician and member of the Chamber of Representatives. A member of Vooruit, she has represented Antwerp since June 2024.

== Early life ==
Beels was born on 8 October 1976 in Calcutta, India. Her mother was Indian and her father was Flemish. Her mother Amna Khatoon, a Muslim, named her Jinnah after Muhammad Ali Jinnah. Her father worked for a shipping company in Calcutta.

When Beels was three her mother died after being poisoned by someone who was jealous due to her being married to a Westerner and about to move to Belgium. The culprit was known but never prosecuted. Beels was placed in a boarding school by her father who, after encountering difficulties as she had no birth certificate, eventually brought her to Antwerp three years later in June 1983.

Beels was brought up by her father and paternal grandmother in Antwerp and was educated at the Onze-Lieve-Vrouwinstituut Pulhof in Berchem. She studied criminology at KU Leuven from 1996 to 2000. She also studied diversity management at KU Leuven (2010–2011) and intercultural management at Lessius Hogeschool (2011–2012).

== Police career ==
Beels trained to be a commissaris (police commissioner) at the National School for Officers in Etterbeek from 2000 to 2002. After qualifying, she joined the Federal Police in Brussels in 2002 as a commissioner. Between 2003 and 2016 she held various positions at the Local police in Antwerp: team manager Hoboken (2003–2006), media spokesperson (2006–2008), head of the diversity department (2008–2015) and deputy regional manager of the northern division (20015-2016). The diversity department was sidelined after the right wing New Flemish Alliance took control of Antwerp in 2012. After falling out with police chief Serge Muyters, Beels was transferred to the local police in Mechelen-Willebroek where she was Gemeenschapsgerichte politiezorg (GGPZ) and diversity officer from 2016 to 2017.

In February 2017 an investigation was launched after a racist message, containing a photograph of Beels with the caption En waarom zou ik je een hand geven? Jou kleur staat me niet aan ("And why should I shake your hand? I don't like your colour"), was shared on WhatsApp by Mechelen police officers, an episode that mayor Bart Somers blamed on a few bad apples. Earlier almost all Moroccan and Turkish origin officers had resigned from the Mechelen police due to racism and bullying. Bert V.L., a 37-year-old chief inspector, was prosecuted for sending the racist message about Beels but was acquitted in May 2018. Prosecutors appealed the verdict but in June 2019 the Court of Appeal in Antwerp upheld the acquittal.

== Politics ==
In October 2017 Beels was chosen as an independent candidate for Samen, an electoral alliance formed by the Socialist Party Different (SP.A) and Groen to contest the 2018 local election in Antwerp. After the alliance broke up Beels aligned with SP.A in January 2018. In June 2018 she started working for the SP.A parliamentary group as a safety advisor. She was elected to the municipal council at the local election. Shortly after the election she joined SP.A. She became schepen (alderman) for education, youth, civic integration and naturalisation in January 2019. In March 2024, after falling out with the local Vooruit branch over its support for Tom Meeuws after he made racist comments, Beels announced that she wouldn't be contesting the 2024 local election and would be moving back to Westerlo where her family live.

Beels contested the 2019 regional election as the SP.A's 33rd placed candidate in Antwerp but was not elected. She was elected to the Chamber of Representatives at the 2024 federal election.

== Personal life ==
Beels is married to a police commissioner and has a son and two step-daughters.

== Electoral history ==
Electoral history of Anja Vanrobaeys
Election	Constituency	Party	Votes	Result
2018 local	Antwerp	Socialist Party Different	12,815	Elected
2019 regional	Antwerp	Socialist Party Different	7,843	Not elected
2024 federal	Antwerp	Vooruit	26,666	Elected
