= Koen Van den Heuvel =

Belgian politician (born 1964)

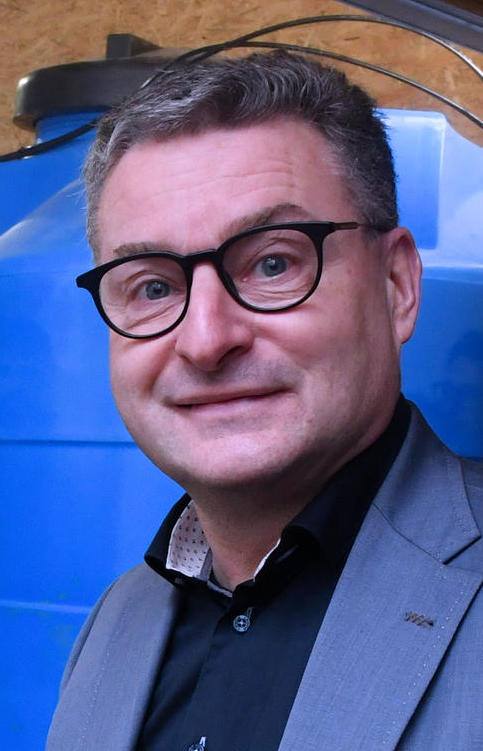
- Van den Heuvel in 2019

Member of the Chamber of Representatives
- Incumbent
- Assumed office 10 July 2024
- Constituency: Antwerp

Personal details
- Born: 1 August 1964 (age 61)
- Party: Christian Democratic and Flemish

Koen Van den Heuvel (born 1 August 1964) is a Belgian politician serving as a member of the Chamber of Representatives. In 2019, he served as minister of environment, nature and agriculture in the Flemish Government.
