= Koen Metsu =

Belgian politician (born 1981)

Koen Metsu (born 23 July 1981) is a Belgian politician for the New Flemish Alliance (N-VA).

== Biography ==
Metsu has been an MP in the Belgian Chamber of Representatives since the 2014 Belgian federal elections. He was reelected in 2019. In addition, he has been a municipal councilor in Edegem since 2012 and has served as mayor of Edegem since 2018.

Outside of politics, Metsu is a graduate of the University of Antwerp with a degree in engineering and he worked as a business manager before becoming involved in the charity sector working with SOS Children's Village and the Vlaams Economisch Verbond.
