= Karel de Grote University of Applied Sciences and Arts =

- Karel de Grote Hogeschool
- Type: University of Applied Sciences
- Established: 1995
- Director: Veerle Hendrickx
- Total staff: 1,225
- Students: 14,500+
- Location: Antwerp, Belgium
- Website: www.kdg.be/en

Karel de Grote University of Applied Sciences and Arts (KdG) (Dutch: Karel de Grote Hogeschool) is a higher education institution established in Antwerp, Belgium.

The university offers bachelor’s, master’s and PhD degrees in fields such as business and management, education, healthcare, visual arts, and technology.

== History ==
Named after Charlemagne (Karel de Grote in Dutch), the university of applied sciences was formed in 1995 through the consolidation of 13 Catholic higher education institutions in Antwerp.

Over the past years, KdG has expanded its educational programmes, modernized its campus and partnered with industry and local businesses.

In 2025, KdG had 133 nationalities represented on campus. Out of 14,871 students, 1,500 were international (10%).

== Campus ==
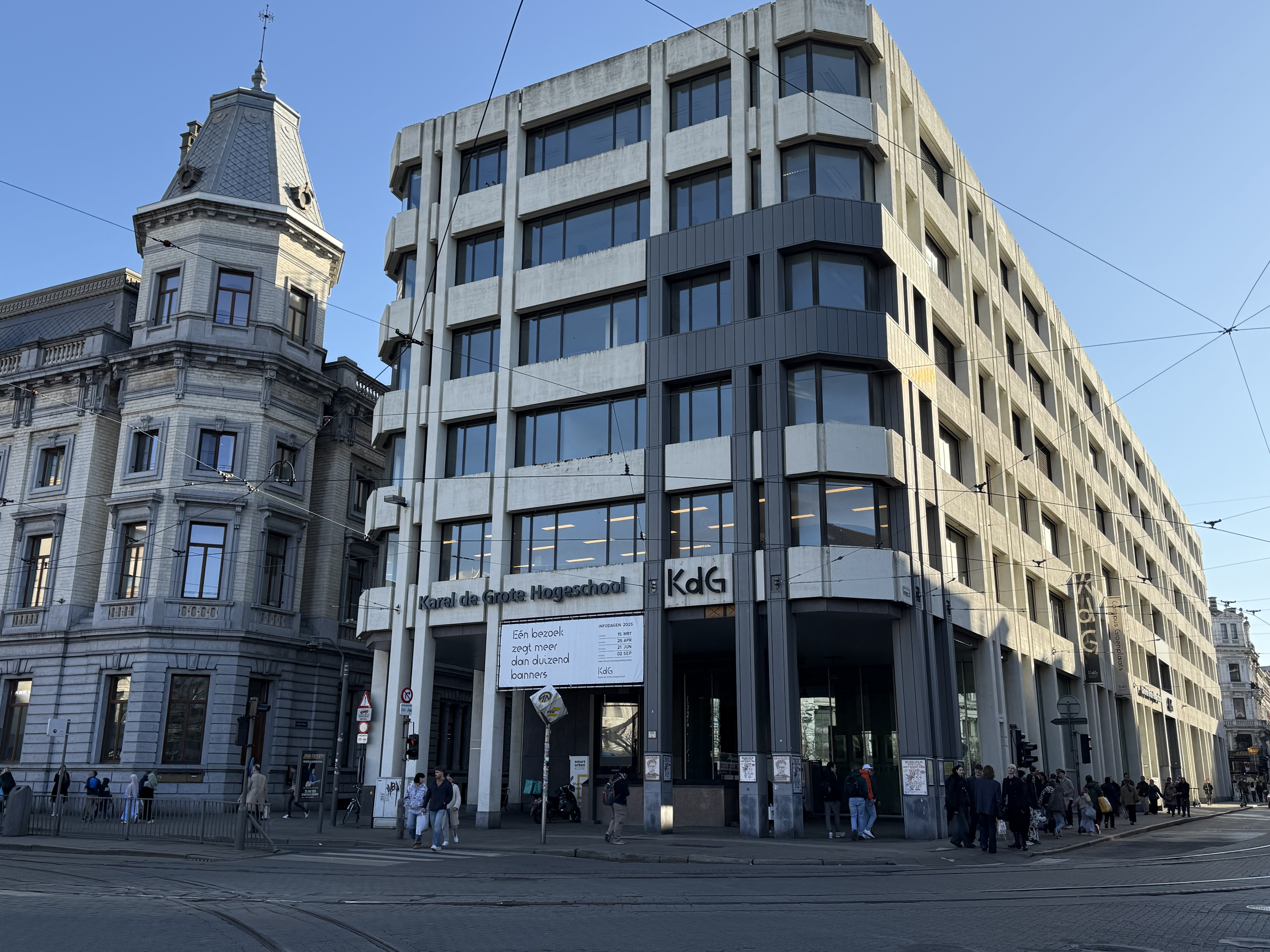
KdG Campus Groenplaats (Antwerp)

The university operates 9 campuses in Antwerp, with its main one located in the city’s student district.

- Campus Bernarduscentrum
- Campus Groenplaats
- Campus Hoboken
- Campus Niel
- Campus Pothoek
- Campus Sint-Jozef
- Campus Sint Lucas Antwerpen
- Campus Stadswaag
- Campus Zuid

All facilities are equipped with collaborative workspaces, and digital learning tools for hybrid and in-person education.

KdG also has 303 partnerships with other universities and institutions, out of which 246 are Erasmus partners in Europe and 57 are non-Erasmus partners worldwide.

== Programmes ==
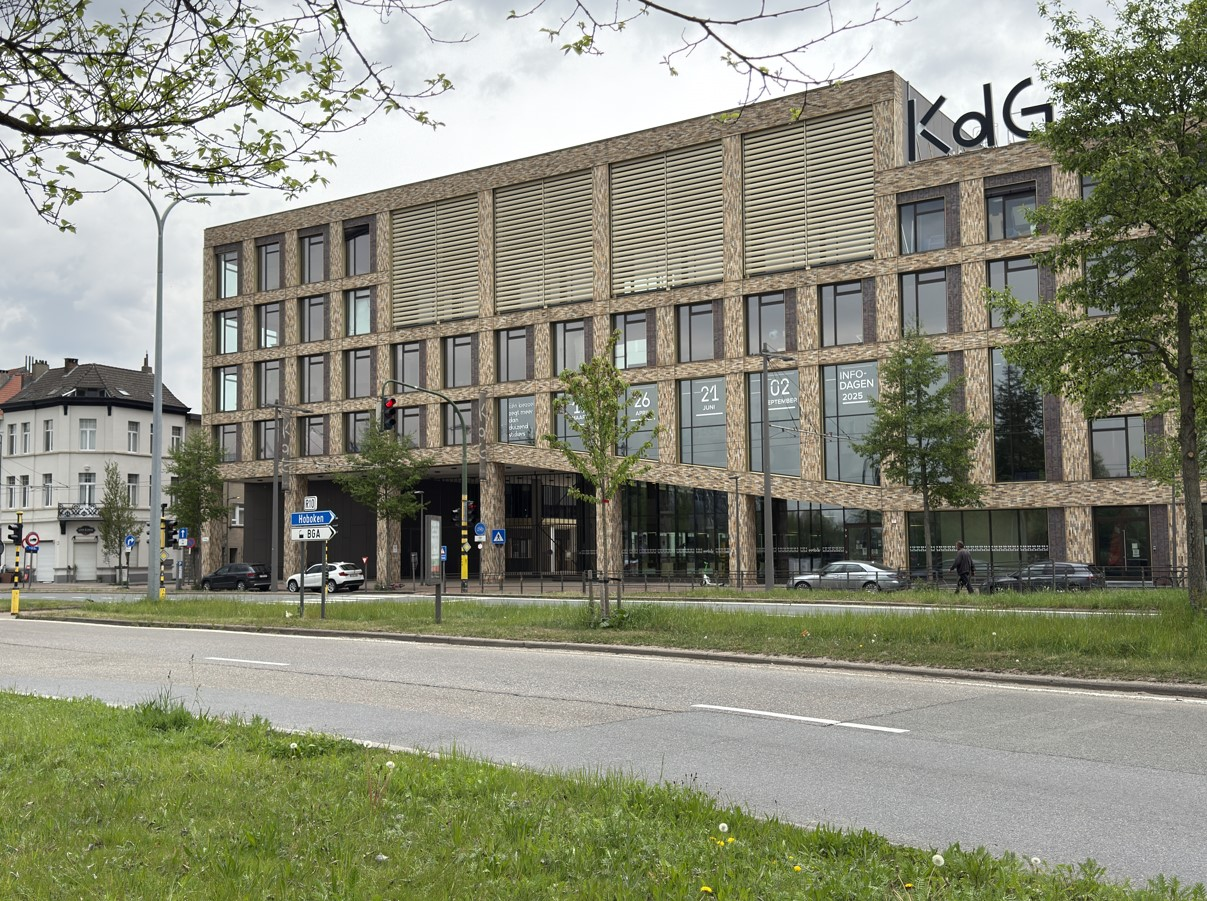
KdG Campus Zuid (Antwerp)

Karel de Grote University of Applied Sciences offers 26 programmes and 38 specializations, 5 of them fully taught in English.

The curricula focus on practical experience, with students participating in internships, applied research projects, and industry collaborations.

From September 2026, KdG will offer its established Nursing programme in an English-taught variant for international students, incorporating Dutch language classes for labour market integration.

== Organisational structure ==
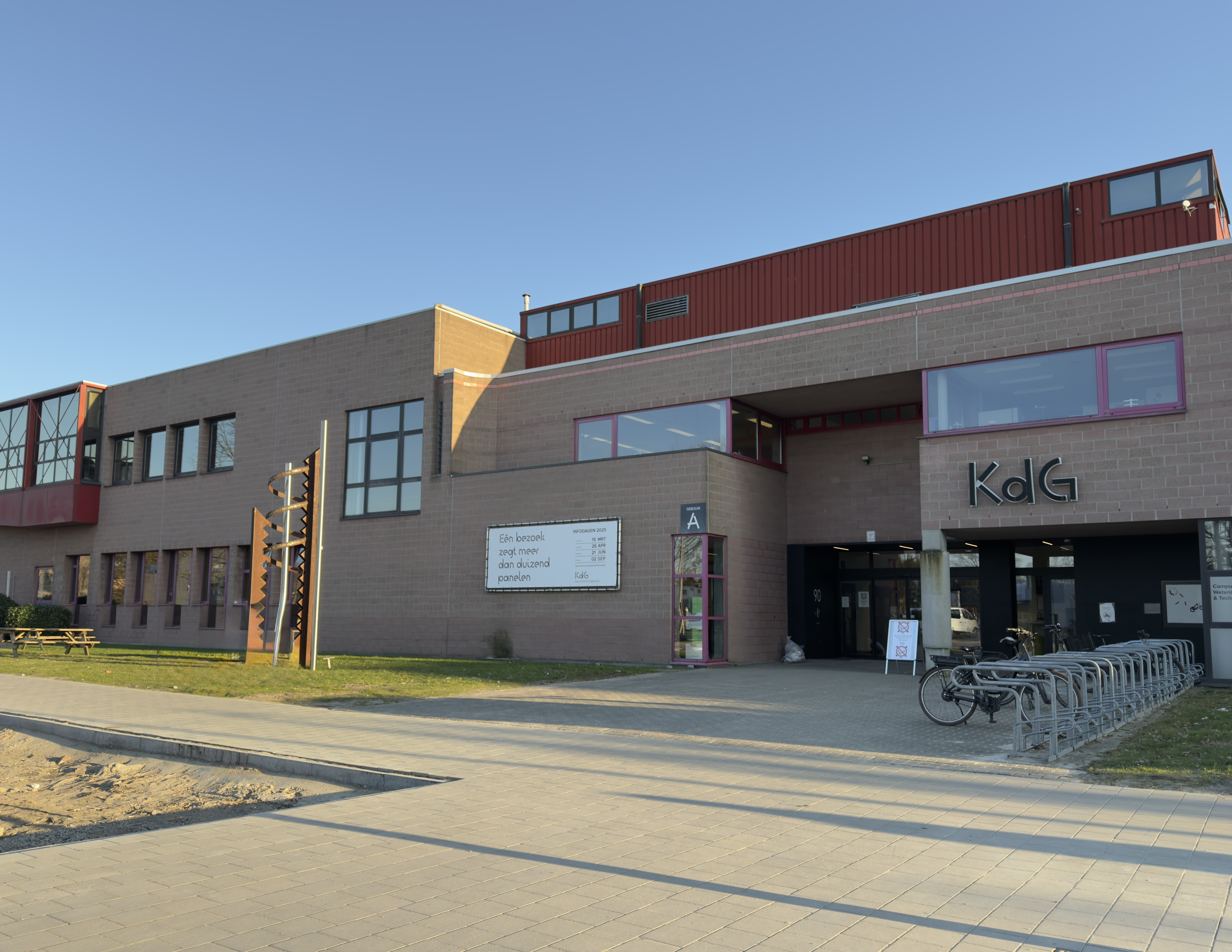
KdG Campus Hoboken (Antwerp)

The university is divided into 6 study areas:

- Health care: 1,920 students
- Business and Economics: 4,690 students
- Industrial Sciences and Technology: 2,290 students
- Education: 2,260 students
- Social and Educational Work: 3,120 students
- Audiovisual and Visual Arts, School of Arts KdG: 430 students

== KdG Research ==
The university of applied sciences conducts practice-oriented research to address specific questions from businesses, organizations, and government institutions.

There are 6 research centers working in 19 areas in more than 250 projects:

- Research Centre Care in Connection
- Research Centre Future-driven Education
- Research Centre Social Inclusion
- Research Centre Sustainable Industries
- Research Centre Public Impact
- Research Centre Pedagogy in Practice

== KdG Academy ==
The KdG Academy provides around 200 development programmes and training sessions for professionals in the education sector; including teachers, directors, companies, and support staff. The programmes focus on soft skills and on three particular domains: Health & Wellbeing, Sustainability & Inclusion, and Digitalisation. Courses range from a few hours to several days, and from microcredentials to post-graduate degrees.
