= Inge Vervotte =

Belgian politician (born 1977)

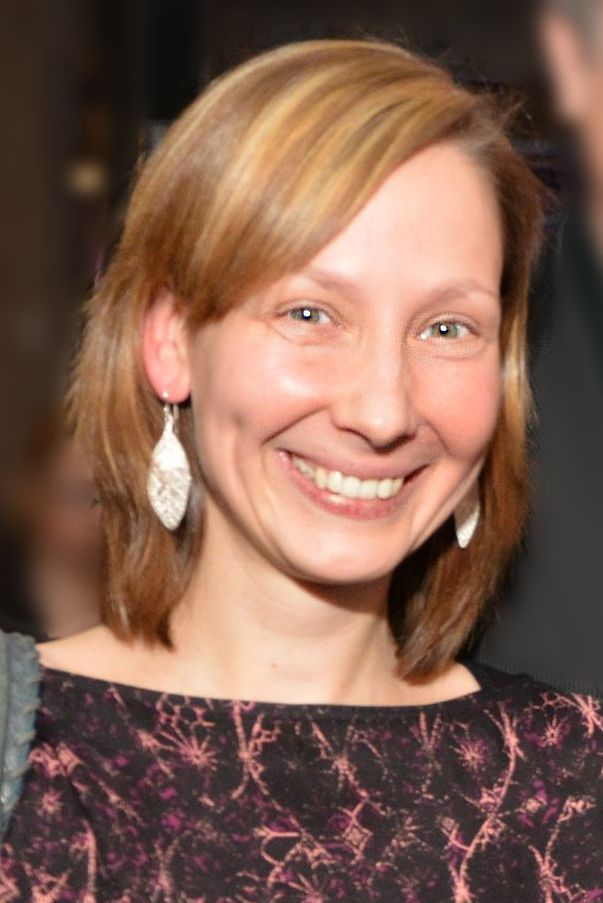
- Inge Vervotte
- Born: 27 December 1977 (age 48); Bonheiden, Belgium
- Occupation: politician

Inge Vervotte (born 27 December 1977) is a Belgian politician for the Christian Democratic and Flemish party (CD&V). She was Belgian federal minister for Civil Service and Public Enterprises in the Leterme I Government, which was in office in 2008 from 20 March to 30 December.

Born in Bonheiden, she graduated in 1998 at the Katholieke Sociale Hogeschool in Heverlee as a social assistant. She started her professional career with the Confederation of Christian Trade Unions (ACV). She became known by the public when she defended the interests of the Sabena workers when their company went into liquidation on 6 November 2001.

She decided to become a politician, and chose for the CD&V party. In the federal elections in 2003, she was elected to the Belgian Chamber of Representatives. In 2004 she was elected again, this time to the Flemish Parliament.

In the summer of 2004, she was appointed the Flemish Minister for Welfare, Public Health and Family. She resigned on 28 June 2007. From 20 December 2007 to March 2008 she was a minister in the Belgian federal Verhofstadt III Government.

On 25 November 2009, she joined the Leterme II Government, once again as Belgian federal minister for Civil Service and Public Enterprises. On 23 August 2011 she announced her retirement from active politics, effective when the caretaker Leterme II government is replaced by a new government.
