= Flemish Brabant (Chamber of Representatives constituency) =

Parliamentary constituency in Belgium

- Vlaams-Brabant; Brabant Flamand; Flämisch-Brabant
- Constituency for the Chamber of Representatives
- Location of Flemish Brabant within Belgium
- Province: Flemish Brabant
- Region: Flanders
- Population: 1,204,541 (2025)
- Electorate: 858,644 (2024)
- Area: 2,118 km^{2} (2024)

Current Constituency
- Created: 2014
- Seats: 15 (2014–present)
- Members: List: Jeroen Bergers (NV-A); Kemal Bilmez (PVDA); Katleen Bury (VB); Nele Daenen (Vooruit); Irina De Knop (Open Vld); Eva Demesmaeker (NV-A); Britt Huybrechts (VB); Fatima Lamarti (Vooruit); Sammy Mahdi (CD&V); Kurt Moons (VB); Darya Safai (NV-A); Dieter Vanbesien (Groen); Kjell Vander Elst (Open Vld); Els Van Hoof (CD&V); Kristien Van Vaerenbergh (NV-A)
- Created from: List: Brussels-Halle-Vilvoorde; Leuven

Flemish Brabant (Dutch: Vlaams-Brabant; French: Brabant Flamand; German: Flämisch-Brabant) is one of the 11 multi-member constituencies of the Chamber of Representatives, the lower house of the Belgian Federal Parliament, the national legislature of Belgium. The constituency was established in 2014 following the Sixth Belgian state reform. It is conterminous with the province of Flemish Brabant. The constituency currently elects 15 of the 150 members of the Chamber of Representatives using the open party-list proportional representation electoral system. At the 2024 federal election the constituency had 858,644 registered electors.

== Electoral system ==
Flemish Brabant currently elects 15 of the 150 members of the Chamber of Representatives using the open party-list proportional representation electoral system. Seats are allocated using the D'Hondt method. Only parties that reach the 5% threshold in the constituency compete for seats.

Electors may vote for the list (party) or for individual candidates, either main candidates or substitute candidates or a combination, on the list. They may vote for as many candidates as there are seats in the constituency. Split-ticket voting (panachage) is not permitted and will result in the ballot paper being invalidated. The minimum number of votes a candidate must obtain to get elected - the quotient - is calculated as the total votes received by the party divided by the number of seats in the constituency plus one. Half the ballot papers where there are no votes for main candidates (i.e. the elector has voted for the list or for substitute candidates only) are redistributed amongst main candidates in the order they appear on the ballot paper so that the candidate's total votes (personal votes plus redistributed votes) equals the quotient. The seats won by the party are then allocated to the candidates with the most number of total votes.

== Election results ==
=== Summary ===
Election	Workers PVDA			Groen Groen / Agalev			Vooruit Vooruit / SP.A / SP.A-Spirit			Liberals & Democrats Open Vld / VLD			Christian Democrats CD&V			New Flemish N-VA / CD&V-N-VA			Vlaams Belang VB / VB		
Election	Votes	%	Seats	Votes	%	Seats	Votes	%	Seats	Votes	%	Seats	Votes	%	Seats	Votes	%	Seats	Votes	%	Seats
2024	57,600	8.04%	1	57,395	8.01%	1	98,092	13.69%	2	83,744	11.68%	2	93,465	13.04%	2	182,883	25.52%	4	119,345	16.65%	3
2019	33,016	4.78%	0	81,620	11.83%	2	65,347	9.47%	1	106,175	15.39%	3	94,743	13.73%	2	193,735	28.08%	5	92,844	13.46%	2
2014	12,664	1.86%	0	59,096	8.70%	1	81,254	11.96%	2	170,128	25.05%	4	112,251	16.53%	3	192,698	28.37%	5	28,857	4.25%	0

(Figures in italics represent alliances.)

=== Detailed ===
==== 2024 ====
Results of the 2024 federal election held on 9 June 2024:

Party		Votes per arrondissement			Total votes	%	Seats
Party		Halle- Vilv- oorde	Leuven	Expat- riates	Total votes	%	Seats
New Flemish Alliance	N-VA	93,744	87,805	1,334	182,883	25.52%	4
Vlaams Belang	VB	60,220	58,329	796	119,345	16.65%	3
Vooruit	Vooruit	41,774	55,357	961	98,092	13.69%	2
Christian Democratic and Flemish	CD&V	46,253	46,560	652	93,465	13.04%	2
Open Flemish Liberals and Democrats	Open Vld	49,522	32,788	1,434	83,744	11.68%	2
Workers' Party of Belgium	PVDA	36,246	21,005	349	57,600	8.04%	1
Groen	Groen	23,821	31,853	1,721	57,395	8.01%	1
For You	VU	5,004	4,838	119	9,961	1.39%	0
Blank Party	PB	3,888	2,858	113	6,859	0.96%	0
Belgische Unie – Union Belge	BUB	3,115	859	112	4,086	0.57%	0
The United		2,511	652	92	3,255	0.45%	0
Valid votes		366,098	342,904	7,683	716,685	100.00%	15
Rejected votes		21,099	13,328	585	35,012	4.66%	
Total polled		387,197	356,232	8,268	751,697	87.54%	
Registered electors		454,717	385,899	18,028	858,644		
Turnout		85.15%	92.31%	45.86%	87.54%		

The following candidates were elected: Kemal Bilmez (PVDA), 17,297 votes; Katleen Bury (VB), 6,803 votes; Irina De Knop (Open Vld), 15,391 votes; Eva Demesmaeker (N-VA), 11,494 votes; Theo Francken (N-VA), 73,820 votes; Britt Huybrechts (VB), 24,408 votes; Fatima Lamarti (Vooruit), 10,521 votes; Sammy Mahdi (CD&V), 37,868 votes; Kurt Moons (VB), 7,745 votes; Darya Safai (N-VA), 14,350 votes; Dieter Vanbesien (Groen), 6,997 votes; Frank Vandenbroucke (Vooruit), 34,629 votes; Kjell Vander Elst (Open Vld), 4,307 votes; Els Van Hoof (CD&V), 14,747 votes; and Kristien Van Vaerenbergh (N-VA), 17,462 votes.

Substitutions:

- Theo Francken (N-VA) was appointed to the federal government and was substituted by Jeroen Bergers (N-VA) on 4 February 2025.
- Frank Vandenbroucke (Vooruit) was appointed to the federal government and was substituted by Nele Daenen (Vooruit) on 4 February 2025.

==== 2019 ====
Results of the 2019 federal election held on 26 May 2019:

Party		Votes per arrondissement			Total votes	%	Seats
Party		Halle- Vilv- oorde	Leuven	Expat- riates	Total votes	%	Seats
New Flemish Alliance	N-VA	100,908	92,536	291	193,735	28.08%	5
Open Flemish Liberals and Democrats	Open Vld	56,163	49,701	311	106,175	15.39%	3
Christian Democratic and Flemish	CD&V	44,607	49,991	145	94,743	13.73%	2
Vlaams Belang	VB	47,981	44,785	78	92,844	13.46%	2
Groen	Groen	39,038	42,217	365	81,620	11.83%	2
Socialist Party Different	SP.A	30,476	34,768	103	65,347	9.47%	1
Workers' Party of Belgium	PVDA	16,593	16,374	49	33,016	4.78%	0
DéFI	DéFI	12,611	1,392	40	14,043	2.04%	0
Belgische Unie – Union Belge	BUB	3,145	1,329	39	4,513	0.65%	0
PRO The Citizens' Lobby	PRO	2,939	1,047	6	3,992	0.58%	0
Valid votes		354,461	334,140	1,427	690,028	100.00%	15
Rejected votes		20,148	14,744	97	34,989	4.83%	
Total polled		374,609	348,884	1,524	725,017	87.10%	
Registered electors		442,872	387,282	2,247	832,401		
Turnout		84.59%	90.09%	67.82%	87.10%		

The following candidates were elected: Katleen Bury (VB), 7,786 votes; Maggie De Block (Open Vld), 40,819 votes; Theo Francken (N-VA), 122,738 votes; Koen Geens (CD&V), 45,962 votes; Katrien Houtmeyers (N-VA), 12,027 votes; Karin Jiroflée (SP.A), 11,839 votes; Goedele Liekens (Open Vld), 15,678 votes; Darya Safai (N-VA), 17,074 votes; Jessika Soors (Groen), 18,226 votes; Jan Spooren (N-VA), 12,033 votes; Dieter Vanbesien (Groen), 5,313 votes; Tim Vandenput (Open Vld), 9,620 votes; Els Van Hoof (CD&V), 13,251 votes; Dries Van Langenhove (VB), 39,295 votes; and Kristien Van Vaerenbergh (N-VA), 17,304 votes.

Substitutions:

- Jan Spooren (N-VA) resigned on 17 September 2020 and was substituted by Sigrid Goethals (N-VA) on the same day.
- Jessika Soors (Groen) resigned on 11 November 2020 and was substituted by Eva Platteau (Groen) on 12 November 2020.
- Dries Van Langenhove (VB) resigned on 4 February 2023 and was substituted by Joris De Vriendt (VB) on 9 February 2023.

==== 2014 ====
Results of the 2014 federal election held on 25 May 2014:

Party		Votes per arrondissement			Total votes	%	Seats
Party		Halle- Vilv- oorde	Leuven	Expat- riates	Total votes	%	Seats
New Flemish Alliance	N-VA	99,045	93,427	226	192,698	28.37%	5
Open Flemish Liberals and Democrats	Open Vld	95,936	73,871	321	170,128	25.05%	4
Christian Democratic and Flemish	CD&V	53,282	58,800	169	112,251	16.53%	3
Socialist Party Different	SP.A	36,986	44,144	124	81,254	11.96%	2
Groen	Groen	25,583	33,339	174	59,096	8.70%	1
Vlaams Belang	VB	14,566	14,248	43	28,857	4.25%	0
Francophone Democratic Federalists	FDF	13,958	1,373	74	15,405	2.27%	0
Workers' Party of Belgium	PVDA	5,115	7,533	16	12,664	1.86%	0
Belgische Unie – Union Belge	BUB	1,819	730	28	2,577	0.38%	0
People's Party	PP	1,578	689	14	2,281	0.34%	0
ROSSEM		724	1,187	3	1,914	0.28%	0
Valid votes		348,592	329,341	1,192	679,125	100.00%	15
Rejected votes		19,378	14,574	107	34,059	4.78%	
Total polled		367,970	343,915	1,299	713,184	87.61%	
Registered electors		433,863	378,446	1,753	814,062		
Turnout		84.81%	90.88%	74.10%	87.61%		

The following candidates were elected: Sonja Becq (CD&V), 15,438 votes; Hans Bonte (SP.A), 15,300 votes; Patricia Ceysens (Open Vld), 11,750 votes; Maggie De Block (Open Vld), 131,713 votes; Inez De Coninck (N-VA), 12,094 votes; Anne Dedry (Groen), 10,598 votes; Theo Francken (N-VA), 44,498 votes; Koen Geens (CD&V), 45,686 votes; Karin Jiroflée (SP.A), 9,013 votes; Jan Spooren (N-VA), 10,010 votes; Luk Van Biesen (Open Vld), 7,650 votes; Tim Vandenput (Open Vld), 8,622 votes; Eric Van Rompuy (CD&V), 23,044 votes; Kristien Van Vaerenbergh (N-VA), 22,177 votes; and Hendrik Vuye (N-VA), 13,320 votes.

Substitutions:

- Maggie De Block (Open Vld) was appointed to the federal government and was substituted by Dirk Janssens (Open Vld) on 14 October 2014.
- Theo Francken (N-VA) was appointed to the federal government and was substituted by Renate Hufkens (N-VA) on 14 October 2014.
- Koen Geens (CD&V) was appointed to the federal government and was substituted by Els Van Hoof (CD&V) on 14 October 2014.
