= Flemish Brabant (Flemish Parliament constituency) =

- Flemish Parliament constituency
- Flemish Brabant within Belgium

Current constituency
- Created: 2004
- Seats: 20

Flemish Brabant is a parliamentary constituency in Belgium used to elect members of the Flemish Parliament since 2004. It corresponds to the province of Flemish Brabant.

Article 26 of the Special Law on Institutional Reform of 1980 gives the Flemish Parliament itself the authority to define its electoral districts by decree. The arrondissemental constituencies were replaced by provincial ones by Special Decree of 30 January 2004. This and related provisions were coordinated into the Special Decree of 7 July 2006.

== Representatives ==
Name	Party	From	To
An Michiels	VB	2004	2009
An Moerenhout	Groen	2009	2014
Bob Verstraete	Open Vld	2004	2009
Bruno Tobback	SP.A	2009	2014
Christian Van Eyken	UF	2004	2014
Daniëlle Vanwesenbeeck	Open Vld	2009	2014
Dominique Guns	Open Vld	2004	2009
Elke Wouters	N-VA	2009	2014
Eloi Glorieux	Groen	2004	2009
Else De Wachter	SP.A	2004	2009
Else De Wachter	SP.A	2009	2014
Eric Van Rompuy	CD&V	2004	2014
Felix Strackx	VB	2004	2014
Flor Koninckx	SP.A	2004	2009
Francis Vermeiren	Open Vld	2004	2009
Gwenny De Vroe	Open Vld	2009	2014
Hermes Sanctorum	Groen	2004	2014
Irina De Knop	Open Vld	2009	2014
Jan Laurys	CD&V	2004	2014
Jo De Ro	Open Vld	2009	2014
Joris Van Hauthem	VB	2004	2014
Jos Bex	SP.A	2004	2009
Karin Brouwers	CD&V	2009	2014
Katia Segers	SP.A	2009	2014
Katrien Partyka	CD&V	2009	2014
Lieve Maes	N-VA	2009	2014
Lorin Parys	N-VA	2009	2014
Marcel Logist	SP.A	2004	2014
Mark Demesmaeker	N-VA	2004	2009
Mia De Vits	SP.A	2009	2014
Michel Doomst	CD&V	2009	2014
Nadia Sminate	N-VA	2009	2014
Patricia Ceysens	Open Vld	2009	2014
Peter Persyn	N-VA	2009	2014
Peter Reekmans	LDD	2009	2014
Peter Van Rompuy	CD&V	2009	2014
Piet De Bruyn	N-VA	2004	2014
Rik Daems	Open Vld	2009	2014
Roland Van Goethem	VB	2004	2009
Tine Eerlingen	N-VA	2009	2014
Tom Dehaene	CD&V	2004	2009
Willy Segers	N-VA	2009	2014
Wim Van Dijck	VB	2004	2014
