= Kurt Moons =

Flemish politician (born 1963)

Member of the Chamber of Representatives
- Incumbent
- Assumed office 2024

Personal details
- Born: Kurt Bert Marie Herman Moons; 13 November 1963 (age 62) Dendermonde, Belgium
- Party: Vlaams Belang (2023-present)

Kurt Bert Marie Herman Moons (born November 13, 1963, in Dendermonde) is a Belgian business entrepreneur and politician of the Vlaams Belang party.

He is the former CEO of the Brantano Footwear group in Belgium and the United Kingdom and since 2024 has been a deputy of the Belgian Chamber of Representatives for the Flemish Brabant constituency.

== Biography ==
=== Education and career ===
Moons graduated with degrees in business law and economics at the Catholic University of Leuven in 1987. After graduating he began working for the Brantano Footwear company and was a financial director for the company before becoming a general manager. In 1998 he was appointed as CEO of the Brabanto Group and moved to the United Kingdom to work as a director for Brantano UK. He stepped down as CEO in March 2008.

After leaving Brantano, Moons became a company director for the flooring company Santana in 2008 before working as the CEO for the bicycle company Eddy Merckx Cycles from 2010 to 2015 and later as a company director for the Euro Shoe Group. Between 2018 and 2023 he was the CEO of the Belgian design company Flamant. He currently leads a management consultancy company called Advimo.

=== Politics ===
From 2009 to 2020, Moons was the spokesman for the Pro-Flandria think-tank of entrepreneurs and business people campaigning for Flemish independence. In October 2023, Moons announced he had joined the Vlaams Belang party. During the 2024 Belgian federal election, he contested the Flemish Brabant constituency and was elected to the Chamber of Representatives.
