= Fatima Lamarti =

Belgian politician (born 1966)

Member of the Chamber of Representatives
- Incumbent
- Assumed office 9 June 2024
- Constituency: Flemish Brabant

Personal details
- Born: 16 December 1966 (age 59) Vilvoorde, Belgium
- Party: Vooruit

Fatima Lamarti (born 16 December 1966) is a Belgian politician and member of the Chamber of Representatives. A member of Vooruit, she has represented Flemish Brabant since June 2024.

Lamarti was born on 16 December 1966 in Vilvoorde and is of Moroccan origin. Her mother is from Tangier and her father is from the Rif Mountains region. She was a school development worker for the municipal council in Vilvoorde for many years. She was later a manager at a transport company. She was also active in PROJO, a progressive youth organisation.

Lamarti was elected to the municipal council in Vilvoorde at the 2000 local election. She was re-elected at the 2006, 2012 and 2018 local elections. She was Schepen (alderman) for education and social integration, Schepen for social affairs and equal opportunities, and a member of the board of directors of Incovo, the local municipal waste company in northern Halle-Vilvoorde. She was elected to the provincial council in Flemish Brabant at the 2006 local elections. She was re-elected at the 2012 and 2018 local elections. She resigned from the provincial council in July 2019.

Lamarti unsuccessfully contested the 2009, 2014 and 2019 regional elections in Flemish Brabant. She was elected to the Chamber of Representatives at the 2024 federal election. She is contesting the 2024 local election as Vooruit's lead candidate for the provincial council in Flemish Brabant and would be required to give up her seat in the Chamber of Representatives if she is elected to the provincial council.

Lamarti has three children.

Electoral history of Fatima Lamarti
Election	Constituency	Party	Votes	Result
2000 local	Vilvoorde	Flemish Socialist Party	387	Elected
2006 local	Vilvoorde	Socialist Party Different-Groen-Spirit	564	Elected
2006 provincial	Flemish Brabant - Vilvoorde	Socialist Party Different-Spirit	2,130	Elected
2009 regional	Flemish Brabant	Socialist Party Different	5,283	Not elected
2012 local	Vilvoorde	Socialist Party Different-Groen	1,345	Elected
2012 provincial	Flemish Brabant - Vilvoorde	Socialist Party Different	3,119	Elected
2014 regional	Flemish Brabant	Socialist Party Different	7,238	Not elected
2018 local	Vilvoorde	Socialist Party Different-Groen	1,514	Elected
2018 provincial	Flemish Brabant - Halle-Vivoorde	Socialist Party Different	7,318	Elected
2019 regional	Flemish Brabant	Socialist Party Different	7,312	Not elected
2024 federal	Flemish Brabant	Vooruit	10,521	Elected
