= Nivelles (Walloon Parliament constituency) =

- Walloon Parliament constituency
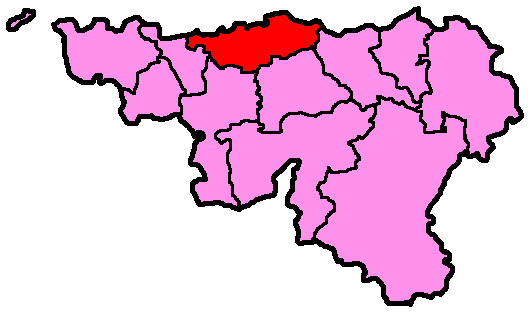
- Nivelles

Current constituency
- Created: 1995
- Seats: 8

Nivelles is a parliamentary constituency in Belgium used to elect members of the Parliament of Wallonia since 1995. It corresponds to the Arrondissement of Nivelles.

== Representatives ==
Representatives of Nivelles (1995–present)
Election	MWP (Party)	MWP (Party)	MWP (Party)	MWP (Party)	MWP (Party)	MWP (Party)	MWP (Party)	MWP (Party)
1995	Léon Walry (PS)	Marcel Cheron (Ecolo)	André Antoine (PSC)	Maurice Dehu (PS)	Raymond Willems (PRL)	Jean-Paul Wahl (MR)	Serge Kubla (MR)	7 seats
1999	Léon Walry (PS)	Marcel Cheron (Ecolo)	André Antoine (PSC)	Alain Trussart (Ecolo)	Jacques Otlet (PRL)	Jean-Paul Wahl (MR)	Pierre Boucher (PRL)	7 seats
2004	Léon Walry (PS)	Marcel Cheron (Ecolo)	Benoît Langendries (CDH)	Maurice Dehu (PS)	Brigitte Defalque (MR)	Jean-Paul Wahl (MR)	Serge Kubla (MR)	Véronique Bidoul (MR)
2009	Léon Walry (PS)	Marcel Cheron (Ecolo)	Benoît Langendries (CDH)	Marianne Saenen (Ecolo)	Florence Reuter (MR)	Jean-Paul Wahl (MR)	Serge Kubla (MR)	Sybille de Coster-Bauchau (MR)
2014	Anne Lambelin (PS)	Hélène Ryckmans (Ecolo)	André Antoine (CDH)	Hassan Idrissi (PS)	Chantal Versmissen-Sollie (MR)	Jean-Paul Wahl (MR)	Lyseline Louvigny (MR)	Olivier Maroy (MR)
2019	Dimitri Legasse (PS)	Hélène Ryckmans (Ecolo)	André Antoine (CDH)	Laurent Heyvaert (Ecolo)	Valerie De Bue (MR)	Jean-Paul Wahl (MR)	Sybille de Coster-Bauchau (MR)	Olivier Maroy (MR)
2024	Anne Lambelin (PS)	Céline Tellier (Ecolo)	Vincent Blondel (Les Engagés)	Armel Gysen (Les Engagés)	Valerie De Bue (MR)	Jean-Paul Wahl (MR)	Nicolas Janssen (MR)	Anne-Catherine Dalcq (MR)
