= Els Van Hoof =

Belgian politician (born 1969)

Member of the Chamber of Representatives
- Incumbent
- Assumed office 11 October 2014
- Preceded by: Koen Geens
- Constituency: Flemish Brabant

Member of the Senate
- In office 28 March 2013 – 24 April 2014
- Preceded by: Rik Torfs
- In office 17 July 2009 – 6 May 2010
- Preceded by: Yves Leterme
- In office 22 March 2008 – 29 December 2008
- Preceded by: Etienne Schouppe
- Succeeded by: Etienne Schouppe

Personal details
- Born: 7 March 1969 (age 57)
- Party: Christian Democratic and Flemish

Els Van Hoof (born 7 March 1969) is a Belgian politician serving as a member of the Chamber of Representatives since 2014. She was a member of the Senate in 2008, from 2009 to 2010, and from 2013 to 2014.
