= Brantano UK =

British shoe retailer

Brantano
- Company type: Private
- Industry: Online Retailer
- Founded: 1998–2017 (Stores); 2018– (Online)
- Fate: Operating Business
- Headquarters: Gloucester, UK, United Kingdom
- Number of locations: Online only
- Area served: United Kingdom
- Key people: David Short (CEO)
- Products: Footwear
- Owner: Gardiner Bros & Co Ltd
- Number of employees: 1,086
- Website: www.brantano.co.uk

Brantano (UK) Ltd was a British shoe retailer, owned by Alteri Investors. The company was started in 1998 by the purchase of 47 Shoe City stores from the British Shoe Corporation by the Belgian retailer Brantano Footwear. It was owned by Macintosh Retail Group until it was bought by Alteri in October 2015. The company entered administration in March 2017 and closed its last store in June 2017.

== History ==
The company originated from a small factory in Lede, East Flanders operated by Andre Brantegem and his brother. Following the fall of the "Shoe City" in mid-1990s, Brantano took over it.

Between 2008 and 2010, Brantano refurbished their stores to bring a new modern style to coincide with the television advertisement airing. In 2009, Brantano introduced a new concept of layout, by laying out merchandise in styles rather than sizes.

In November 2011, Brantano opened their new website including many new features and a new streamlined design.

In 2015, Brantano opened 36 new stores in the UK, and planned to expand into 2015-2016 to open many more stores.

The company was purchased along with its sister company Jones Bootmaker by restructuring specialist Alteri Investors in October 2015 for £12 million. In January 2016, Brantano UK filed for administration and was bought back by Alteri.

Alteri filed an intention to appoint administrators for Jones on 15 March 2017, and entered Brantano into administration for a second time on 22 March 2017. All stores have since closed.

== Brands ==
- Clarks
- Hush Puppies
- US Brass
- CAT
- Wrangler
- Nike
- Reebok
- Rocket Dog
- Skechers
- Lotus
- Lambretta
- Puma
- Gola
- Adidas
- Rider
- Pikolinos
- Ravel
- Pineapple
- KangaRoos
- Kickers
- Bootleg
- OshKosh
- Front
- Frank Wright
- Characters (e.g., Peppa Pig, Toy Story)

Brantano has their own brands manufactured by external companies:

- Red Level - Men's and Ladies (Discontinuing 2013/14)
- Orchard - Men's and Ladies
- Osaga, Mecury or MX2 - Men's, Ladies and Kids
- Emilo Luca X - Men's and Ladies
- Emilo Luca X Red - Men's and Ladies
- Zinc - Men's
- Stone Creek - Men's
- Feet Street - Kids
- B-Club - Kids
- Skittles - Kids

== Advertising ==
Brantano UK Ltd launched a television advert, which features a fictional psychologist called Anne-Marie Brantano, portrayed as one of the giants of twentieth century psychology along with Sigmund Freud and Carl Jung. She is supposed to have discovered the 'sling-back synapse'; an imaginary part of the female brain in the shape of a shoe, which reveals what women want from their shoe shopping experience. It also describes the condition "shoe rage". The concept of the campaign was to change the public's perception of Brantano from a discount warehouse, to a high fashion, affordable shoe megastore.

== Charity ==
Brantano UK has been helping to raise money for the baby charity Tommy's since 2008 and have raised £104,751.48 so far through its in-store fundraising events.
