= Vincent Scourneau =

Belgian politician (born 1967)

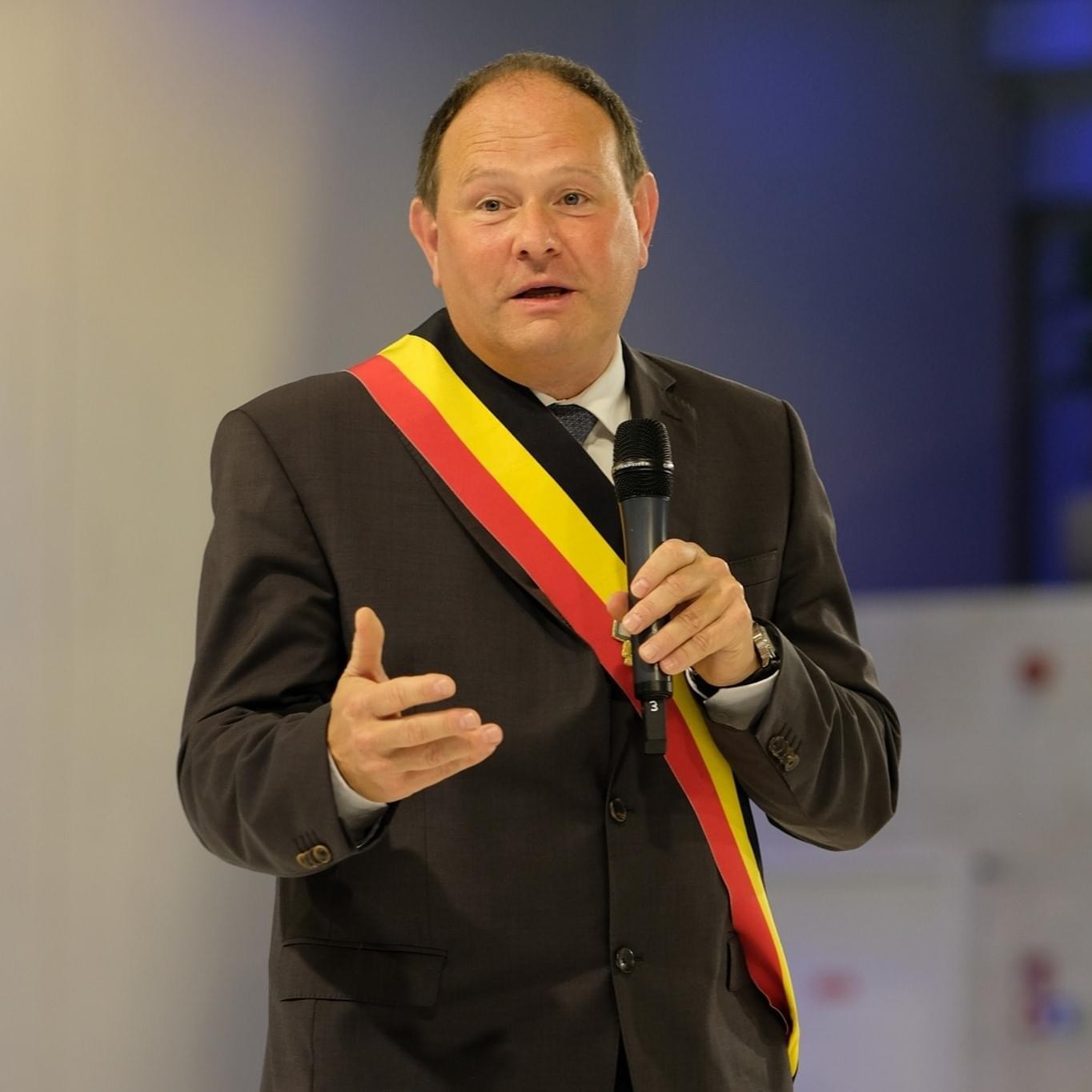
- Scourneau in 2022

Member of the Chamber of Representatives
- Incumbent
- Assumed office 14 November 2019
- Preceded by: Charles Michel
- Constituency: Walloon Brabant
- In office 14 October 2014 – 20 June 2019
- Preceded by: Charles Michel
- Constituency: Walloon Brabant

Personal details
- Born: 22 June 1967 (age 58)
- Party: Reformist Movement

Vincent Scourneau (born 22 June 1967) is a Belgian politician of the Reformist Movement serving as a member of the Chamber of Representatives. He has served as mayor of Braine-l'Alleud since 2001.
