= 2024 Belgian federal election =

- 9 June 2024
- All 150 seats in the Chamber of Representatives; 76 seats needed for a majority
- Turnout: 88.45% (▲0.07pp)
Party	Leader	Vote %	Seats	+/–
N-VA	Bart De Wever	16.71	24	−1
Vlaams Belang	Tom Van Grieken	13.77	20	+2
MR	Georges-Louis Bouchez	10.26	20	+6
PVDA-PTB	Raoul Hedebouw	9.86	15	+3
PS	Paul Magnette	8.04	16	−4
Vooruit	Melissa Depraetere	8.11	13	+4
CD&V	Sammy Mahdi	7.98	11	−1
LE	Maxime Prévot	6.77	14	+9
Open Vld	Tom Ongena	5.45	7	−5
Groen	Nadia Naji & Jeremie Vaneeckhout	4.65	6	−2
Ecolo	Rajae Maouane & Jean-Marc Nollet	2.93	3	−10
DéFI	François De Smet	1.20	1	−1
This lists parties that won seats. See the complete results below.

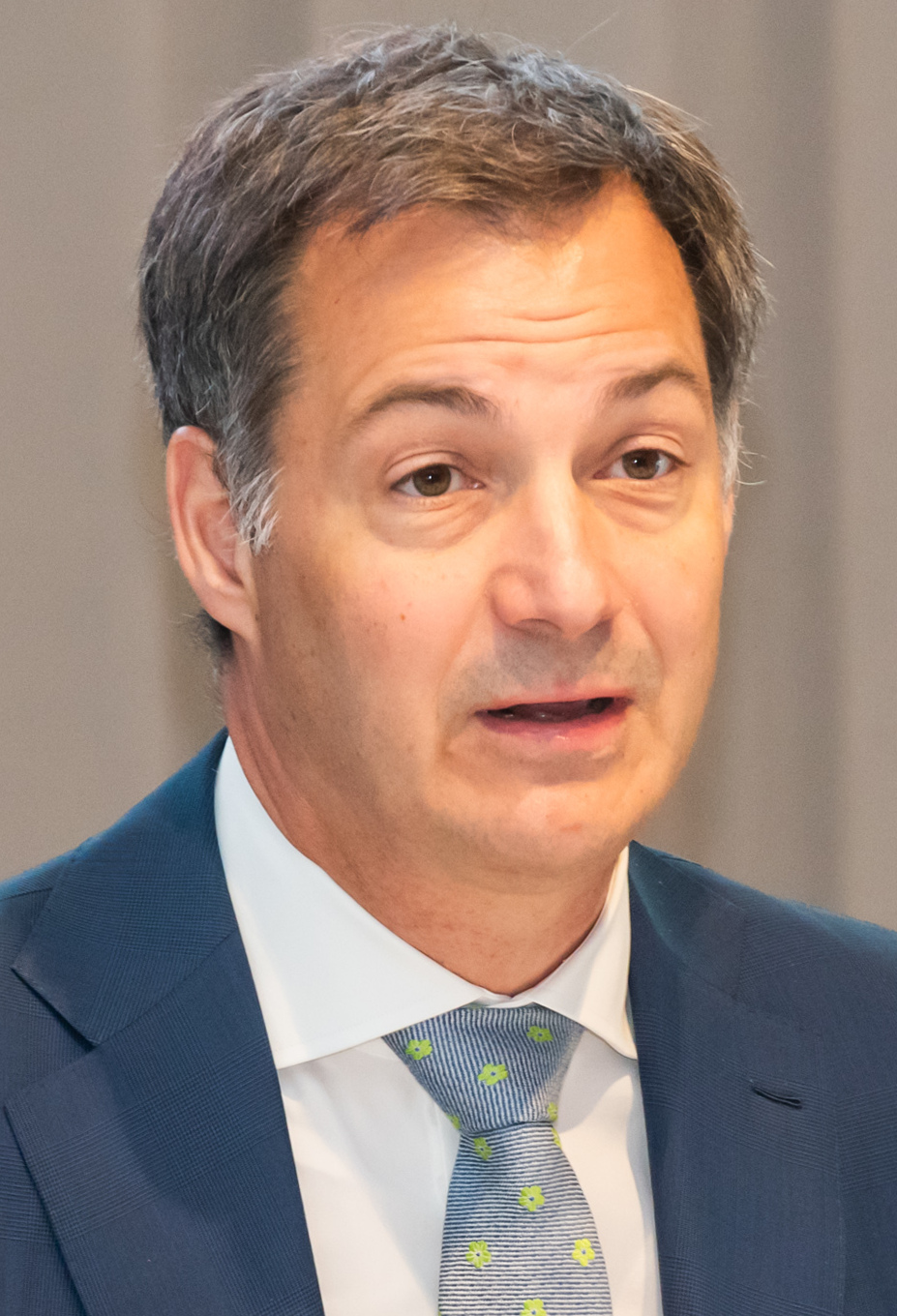

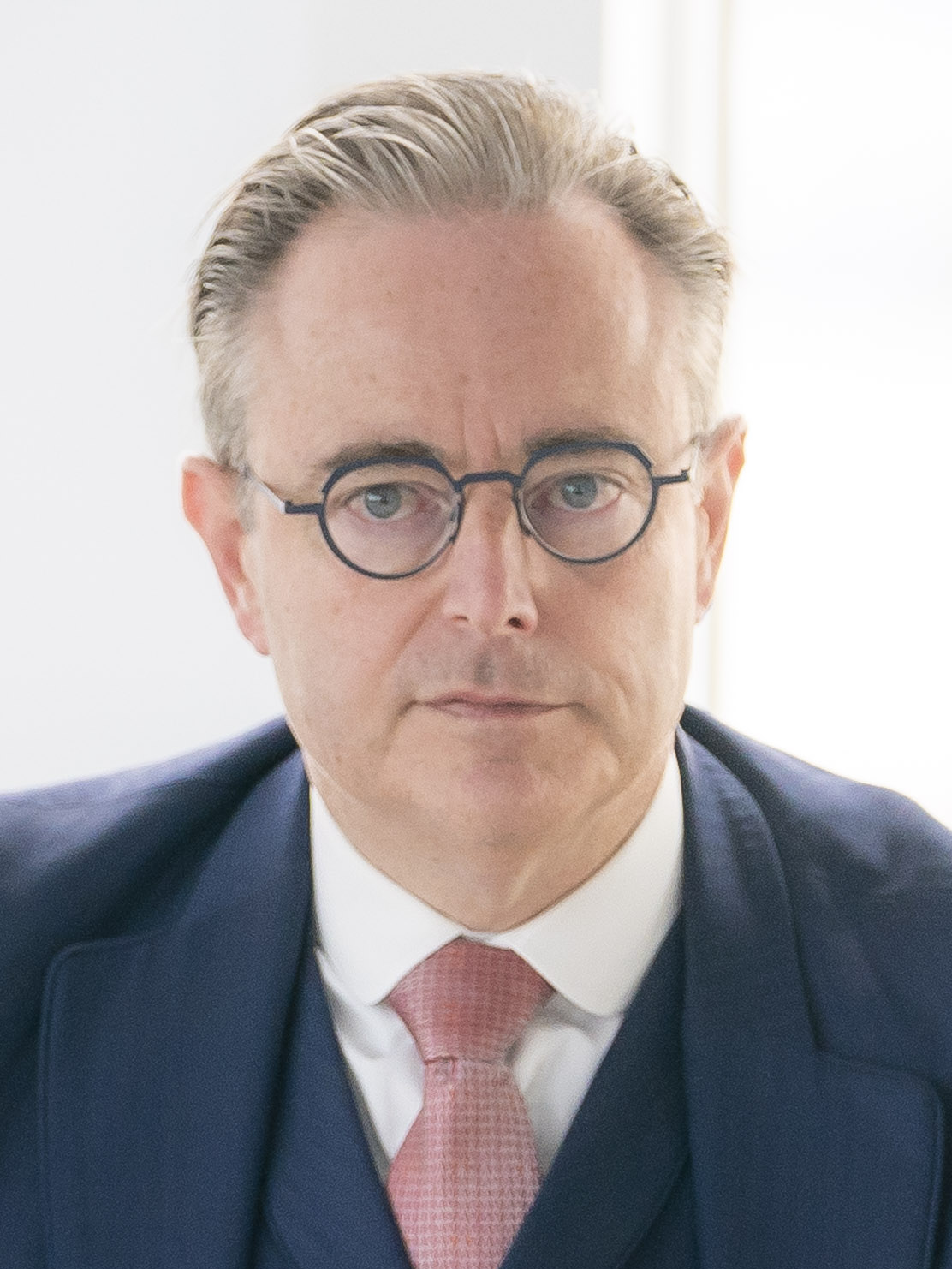
Federal Government before	Federal Government after
De Croo Government	De Wever Government

Federal elections were held in Belgium on 9 June 2024. The Chamber of Representatives received 150 members with five-year terms. European and regional elections took place on the same day.

== Background ==
After a lengthy government formation spanning 494 days, the 2019 Belgian federal election eventually resulted in the formation of a government led by prime minister Alexander De Croo, consisting of a so-called Vivaldi coalition. The government replaced a government led by Sophie Wilmès, which was a caretaker minority government with emergency plenary powers given by the opposition to deal with the COVID-19 outbreak in Belgium.

== Electoral system ==

The 150 members of the Chamber of Representatives are elected in 11 multi-member constituencies, being the ten provinces and Brussels, with between 4 and 24 seats. Seats are allocated using the D'Hondt method, with an electoral threshold of 5% per constituency.

The 87 representatives elected from the five Flemish Region provinces, Antwerp (24), East Flanders (20), Flemish Brabant (15), Limburg (12) and West Flanders (16), automatically belonged to the Dutch-speaking language group in parliament, whereas those 47 elected from the five provinces of Wallonia, Hainaut (17), Liège (14), Luxembourg (4), Namur (7) and Walloon Brabant (5), formed the French-speaking language group. The 16 members elected in Brussels can choose to join either group. Apportionment of seats is done every ten years in accordance with population data, last by royal order in 2022, when Brussels and Namur each gained a seat while Hainaut and Liège lost a seat.

The 60-member Senate is composed of 50 representatives from the regional and community parliaments, plus 10 co-opted senators proportionally divided among parties based on the result of the federal election.

All Belgian citizens aged 18 or over are obligated to participate in the election. Non-Belgian citizens residing in Belgium (regardless of EU citizenship) cannot vote, whereas Belgian citizens living abroad can register to vote.

Prior to the elections, Belgium lowered the voting age to 16. The initial implementation of this change allowed for 16 and 17 years olds to participate in elections, but only after requesting and receiving the approval of their local governments. However, the Belgian Constitutional Court ruled that these restrictions were unconstitutional and they were struck down. In March 2024, the court would go on to rule that compulsory voting rules would be upheld for 16 and 17 year olds, meaning they could be sanctioned if they failed to vote.

Voting is done electronically in all 19 Brussels and nine German-speaking municipalities, as well as in 159 Flemish municipalities. Voting is done by paper ballot in 141 Flemish municipalities as well as in all 253 (non-German-speaking) Walloon municipalities.

=== Timetable ===
9 February	Start of the "waiting period" (sperperiode) running until the day of the election, during which political propaganda and expenses are strictly regulated
1 April	The electoral roll is fixed by municipal authorities and available for scrutiny
13 April	Deadline for submitting candidate lists
TBD	The Parliament is formally dissolved
25 May	Final day for the official announcement of the election and the convocation letter to voters
5 June	Polling day for Belgians residing abroad in the embassies and consular posts
9 June	Polling day (from 8am until 2pm, or until 4pm where voting is done electronically)
10 July	Constitutive session of the newly elected Chamber of Representatives

== Parties ==
=== Sitting ===
The following parties running had seats in the Chamber of Representatives prior to the elections.

Party	Ideology	Political position	Leader	2019 result	Status
N-VA	Conservatism; Flemish nationalism	Centre-right to right-wing	Bart De Wever	25 / 150	Opposition
Vlaams Belang	Right-wing populism Flemish nationalism	Far-right	Tom Van Grieken	18 / 150	Opposition
PS	Social democracy Democratic socialism	Centre-left to left-wing	Paul Magnette	20 / 150	Governing coalition
Vooruit	Social democracy	Centre-left	Melissa Depraetere	9 / 150	Governing coalition
Reformist Movement	Liberalism	Centre-right	Georges-Louis Bouchez	14 / 150	Governing coalition
Open Vld	Liberalism	Centre-right	Tom Ongena	12 / 150	Governing coalition
Ecolo	Green politics	Centre-left	Rajae Maouane and Jean-Marc Nollet	13 / 150	Governing coalition
Groen	Green politics	Centre-left	Nadia Naji and Jeremie Vaneeckhout	8 / 150	Governing coalition
Christian Democratic and Flemish	Christian democracy	Centre to centre-right	Sammy Mahdi	12 / 150	Governing coalition
Workers' Party of Belgium	Socialism; Marxism	Left-wing to far-left	Raoul Hedebouw	12 / 150	Opposition
Les Engagés	Social liberalism	Centre	Maxime Prévot	5 / 150	Opposition
DéFI	Regionalism; Social liberalism	Centre to centre-right	François De Smet	2 / 150	Opposition

==== Outside ====
Party	Ideology	Political position	Constituency
Blanco Party	Single-issue	Centrism	Flemish and Walloon
Belgische Unie – Union Belge	Royalism Unitarism	Centrism	Flemish and Walloon
L'Unie	Unitarism	Centrism	Flemish and Walloon
Alternatief 2024	Participatory democracy	Centrism	Only in Flemish Brabant
BoerBurgerBelangen	Agrarianism	Centre-right	Flemish
DierAnimal	Animal welfare Environmentalism	Centre-left	Antwerp
Gezond Verstand	Liberalism Anti-Flemish independence	Centre-right	East Flanders
Volt	Social liberalism European federalism	Centre-left	All
VoorU	Liberalism Libertarianism	Right	Flemish
Collectif Citoyen	Participatory democracy	Centre	Walloon
Chez Nous	Anti-immigration National conservatism	Far-right	Walloon
Team Fouad Ahidar	Minority interests	Centre	Brussels
Agora	Participatory democracy	Centre	Walloon
Lutte Ouvrière	Trotskyism	Far-left	Walloon

=== Lead candidates ===
The following candidates are the first on the respective party list (lijsttrekker / tête de liste) per constituency.

==== Dutch-speaking constituencies ====
Party	Antwerp	East Flanders	Flemish Brabant	Limburg	West Flanders	Brussels
CD&V	Annelies Verlinden	Vincent Van Peteghem	Sammy Mahdi	Nawal Farih	Nathalie Muylle	Together with Les Engagés
Groen	Meyrem Almaci	Petra De Sutter	Dieter Van Besien	Dirk Opsteyn	Matti Vandemaele	Together with Ecolo
N-VA	Bart De Wever	Anneleen Van Bossuyt	Theo Francken	Steven Vandeput	Jean-Marie Dedecker	Toby De Backer
Open Vld	Paul Van Tigchelt	Alexander De Croo	Irina De Knop	Steven Coenegrachts	Vincent Van Quickenborne	Together with MR
PVDA	Peter Mertens	Robin Tonniau	Kemal Bilmez	Kim De Witte	Natalie Eggermont	Together with PTB
Vlaams Belang	Lode Vereeck	Barbara Pas	Britt Huybrechts	Annick Ponthier	Wouter Vermeersch	Jan Verleysen
Vooruit	Jinnih Beels	Joris Vandenbroucke	Frank Vandenbroucke	Funda Oru	Melissa Depraetere	Together with PS
Volt	Jasper Coosemans					Emeric Massaut
VoorU	Frank Wouters	Michael Verstraeten	Els Ampe	Dirk Vijnck	Ivan Sabbe	Rachid El Hajui
l'Unie			Alexandra Bernaert			Charles de Groot

==== French-speaking constituencies ====
Hainaut will feature three party chairmen (Bouchez for MR, Magnette for PS and Nollet for Ecolo) as well as popular ex-MR ex-minister Crucke for Les Engagés. In Namur, three federal deputy prime ministers will run against each other (Dermagne for PS, Gilkinet for Ecolo and Clarinval for MR). The right-wing Flemish nationalist N-VA party is also fielding candidates in Wallonia for the first time.

Party	Hainaut	Liège	Luxembourg	Namur	Walloon Brabant	Brussels
DéFI	Mikhaël Jacquemain	Freddy Debarsy	Didier Serteyn	Julien Lemoine	Pierre Pinte	François De Smet
Ecolo	Jean-Marc Nollet	Sarah Schlitz	Olivier Vajda	Georges Gilkinet	Simon Moutquin	Zakia Khattabi
Les Engagés	Jean-Luc Crucke	Vanessa Matz	Benoît Lutgen	Maxime Prévot	Yves Coppieters	Elisabeth Degryse
MR	Georges-Louis Bouchez	Pierre-Yves Jeholet	Benoît Piedboeuf	David Clarinval	Florence Reuter	Sophie Wilmès
PS	Paul Magnette	Frédéric Daerden	Philippe Courard	Pierre-Yves Dermagne	Dimitri Legasse	Caroline Désir
PTB	Sofie Merckx	Raoul Hedebouw		Farah Jacquet	Amaury Laridon	Nabil Boukili
N-VA	Michel De Wolf	Evelien Barbieux	Anne-Laure Mouligneaux	Laurence Genot	Drieu Godefridi	Toby De Backer
Chez Nous	Jérôme Munier	Noa Pozzi	Nicolas Dielman	Eric Doucet	Michaël Lefèvere	
l'Unie					Andrew Scrivener	Charles de Groot

== Retiring incumbents ==
The following members of the federal parliament are not standing for election in June 2024.

- Patrick Dewael (Open Vld)
- Valerie Van Peel (N-VA)
- Maggie De Block (Open Vld)
- Barbara Creemers (Groen)
- Wouter De Vriendt (Groen)
- Kristof Calvo (Groen), though he later announced he will support the Ecolo list in Hainaut, without aiming to be elected
- Steven Creyelman (Vlaams Belang)
- Meryame Kitir (Vooruit)
- Jessika Soors (Groen)

== Opinion polls ==
In the run up to the 2024 Belgian federal election, various organisations carried out opinion polling to gauge voting intentions in Belgium. The date range for these polls were from a few months after the 2019 Belgian federal election, held on 25 May 2019, to shortly before the 2024 Belgian federal election. The results of nationwide polls were usually numerically split into the three Belgian regions: Flanders, Brussels and Wallonia. The federal election was part of a group of elections which also included the regional elections and the European elections. Some polls might have undefined voting intentions without differentiating between the elections.

Analysis of social media by researchers at the University of Antwerpen found that much of the political discourse amongst the public surrounded economic issues. While education, migration and social issues were also discussed, economic concerns constituted the vast majority of online discourse. Research in party communication also showed a regional divide in focal issues. Both right-wing Flemish parties campaigned primarily on economic policy, along with attention to migration and crime. Polling prior to the election seemed to indicate that far-right separatist party Vlaams Blok (VB) could unseat the New Flemish Alliance (N-VA) as the majority party in Flanders. In the French speaking regions, communication regarding unemployment was prominent, but other issues unrelated to the economy like civil rights and environmental issues also retained focus. Parti Socialiste (PS), at the time the largest party in Wallonia, showed a markedly worse performance in polls than previous election cycles. Voting intention for PS continued to decline preceding the election date.

== Results ==
The results saw the New Flemish Alliance remain the largest party in parliament, while the incumbent coalition government led by Prime Minister Alexander De Croo and his Open Flemish Liberals and Democrats held on to its majority by only one seat, despite the latter party falling to ninth place in the election tally. The Reformist Movement emerged as the largest party in Brussels and Wallonia.

Party	Votes	%	+/–	Seats	+/–
New Flemish Alliance	1,167,061	16.71	+0.68	24	–1
Vlaams Belang	961,601	13.77	+1.82	20	+2
Reformist Movement	716,934	10.26	+2.70	20	+6
Workers' Party of Belgium	688,369	9.86	+1.23	15	+3
Vooruit	566,436	8.11	+1.40	13	+4
Socialist Party	561,602	8.04	–1.42	16	–4
Christian Democratic and Flemish	557,392	7.98	–0.91	11	–1
Les Engagés	472,755	6.77	+3.07	14	+9
Open Flemish Liberals and Democrats	380,659	5.45	–3.09	7	–5
Groen	324,608	4.65	–1.46	6	–2
Ecolo	204,438	2.93	–3.22	3	–10
DéFI	84,024	1.20	–1.02	1	–1
Blanco Party	75,683	1.08	New	0	New
Chez Nous	64,058	0.92	New	0	New
Voor U	43,346	0.62	New	0	New
Citizen Collective	35,706	0.51	+0.20	0	0
Team Fouad Ahidar	24,826	0.36	New	0	New
Belgische Unie – Union Belge	15,780	0.23	+0.13	0	0
DierAnimal	10,341	0.15	–0.56	0	0
Volt Belgium	7,245	0.10	+0.08	0	0
Lutte Ouvrière	6,552	0.09	+0.01	0	0
L'Unie	5,640	0.08	New	0	New
Reprise en Main Citoyenne	4,025	0.06	New	0	New
Agora	3,473	0.05	New	0	New
Gezond Verstand	2,352	0.03	New	0	New
Total	6,984,906	100.00	–	150	0
Valid votes	6,984,906	94.37			
Invalid/blank votes	416,577	5.63			
Total votes	7,401,483	100.00			
Registered voters/turnout	8,368,029	88.45			
Source: IBZ

=== Senate ===
Since the sixth state reform of 2011, the Senate is no longer directly elected. The regional parliaments elect 50 senators based on the results of the concurrent regional elections (the Flemish Parliament elects 29, the Parliament of the French Community elects ten, the Walloon Parliament elects eight, the Parliament of the Brussels-Capital Region elects two Francophone senators and the Parliament of the German-speaking Community elects one). The elected senators in turn co-opt 10 senators (six Dutch-speaking and four Francophone), who are allocated based on the preceding election results of the Chamber of Representatives, making a total of 60 senators.

The distribution of seats among parties resulted as following:

Party	Seats			
Party	Elected	Co-opted	Total	+/–
New Flemish Alliance	8	2	10	+1
Vlaams Belang	7	1	8	+1
Reformist Movement	7	1	8	+1
Workers' Party	5	1	6	+1 (Note: The elected members included three Francophone senators and two Dutch-speaking ones; the co-opted member was Francophone.)
Socialist Party	5	1	6	–1
Vooruit	4	0 (Note: Due to its opposition to the Senate as an institution, Vooruit refused to co-opt a senator.)	4	+1
Christian Democratic and Flemish	4	1	5	0
Les Engagés	4	1	5	+3
Open Flemish Liberals and Democrats	2	1	3	–2
Groen	2	0	2	–2
Ecolo	1	0	1	–4
ProDG	1	0	1	+1
Perspectives. Freedom. Progress.	0	0	0	–1
Total	50	9	59	–1

== Aftermath ==
Following the release of the election results, Alexander De Croo announced his resignation as Prime Minister effective on 10 June. After this, he will remain as caretaker prime minister until a new federal government is formed. Tom Ongena also announced his resignation as party leader, and ruled out Open Vld's participation in the next government. Of the French-speaking parties, François De Smet, chair of Défi, and Paul Magnette, president of PS, also submitted their resignation, though Magnette's resignation was rejected by the party's board.

The New Flemish Alliance's (N-VA) Bart De Wever claimed victory. Even though Vlaams Belang came second, its leader Tom Van Grieken expressed disappointment, as the party was expected to overtake N-VA to become the biggest in Flanders. In Wallonia, Reformist Movement's (MR) president Georges-Louis Bouchez emphasized the electorate's willingness for change, after his party gained more votes than PS for the first time in decades. According to political analysts, the most obvious federal coalition would consist of the right-wing N-VA and MR, and centre-left Vooruit, with the centrist CD&V and Les Engagés parties to reach at least 76 seats. Other coalitions are ruled out, following the decision of Open Vld and PS to be part of the opposition. Vlaams Belang is not expected to be part of the government at any level, due to the cordon sanitaire.

Exploratory coalition talks started on 10 June, the day after the elections. As is tradition, party leaders are individually invited to an audience with the King, starting with the biggest parties. On 11 June, the MR and Les Engagés announced a preliminary agreement to form a government in the Walloon parliament, following the regional elections. As part of the agreement, the two parties would form a partnership during government formation talks at the federal level. On 31 January 2025, a governmental agreement was reached between the Arizona parties, with De Wever being sworn in as prime minister on 3 February 2025.
