= Eva Demesmaeker =

Belgian politician (born 1995)

Member of the Chamber of Representatives
- Incumbent
- Assumed office 4 July 2024
- Constituency: Flemish Brabant

Personal details
- Born: 23 December 1995 (age 30) Halle
- Party: New Flemish Alliance

Eva Demesmaeker (born 23 December 1995) is a Belgian politician of the New Flemish Alliance. Since 2024, she has been a member of the Chamber of Representatives.

== Biography ==
Demesmaeker was born in Halle in 1995. She was a professional dancer and in 2018 won the title of best Flemish solo dancer. She then worked as a dance and physical education teacher at the Don Bosco secondary school in Halle before going to study a master's degree in political science at the Vrije Universiteit Brussel.

In the 2018 local elections, she was elected municipal councillor of Halle. As a member of the council she focused on matters related to culture, sport, Flemish history and social affairs. She has served as a member of the Chamber of Representatives since 2014. She sits on the committees for Home Affairs, Security, Migration and Administrative Affairs and of the Committee on Constitution and Institutional Renewal in the Belgian federal parliament.
