= Kjell Vander Elst =

Belgian politician (born 1995)

Member of the Chamber of Representatives
- Incumbent
- Assumed office 10 July 2024
- Constituency: Flemish Brabant

Personal details
- Born: 20 June 1995 (age 30)
- Party: Open Flemish Liberals and Democrats
- Parent: Joël Vander Elst (father)

Kjell Vander Elst (born 20 June 1995) is a Belgian politician of the Open Flemish Liberals and Democrats serving as a member of the Chamber of Representatives since 2024. He is the son of Joël Vander Elst.
