= Lennik =

- Municipality
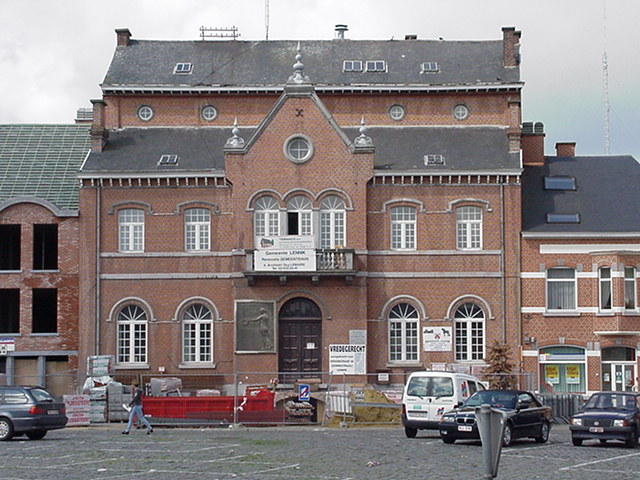
- Lennik's town hall

- Flag Coat of arms

- Location of Lennik in Flemish Brabant
- Interactive map of Lennik
- Location in Belgium
- Coordinates: 50°48′N 04°09′E
- Country: Belgium
- Community: Flemish Community
- Region: Flemish Region
- Province: Flemish Brabant
- Arrondissement: Halle-Vilvoorde

Government
  - Mayor: Irina De Knop (LB)
  - Governing parties: LB, CD&V, Groen

Area
  - Total: 31.12 km^{2} (12.02 sq mi)

Population (2018-01-01)
  - Total: 9,024
  - Density: 290.0/km^{2} (751.0/sq mi)
- Postal codes: 1750
- NIS code: 23104
- Area codes: 02, 054
- Website: www.lennik.be

Lennik (Dutch pronunciation: [ˈlɛnɪk]) is a municipality located in the Belgian province of Flemish Brabant. The municipality comprises the towns of Sint-Kwintens-Lennik, Sint-Martens-Lennik, Eizeringen and Gaasbeek. It is also situated in the Pajottenland. On January 1, 2006, Lennik had a total population of 8,694. The total area is 30.80 km^{2} which gives a population density of 282 inhabitants per km^{2}.

On its territory is the national Gaasbeek Castle museum. A 4 metre high statue of Prince (a Belgian Draught, draught horse) stands on the Market Place.

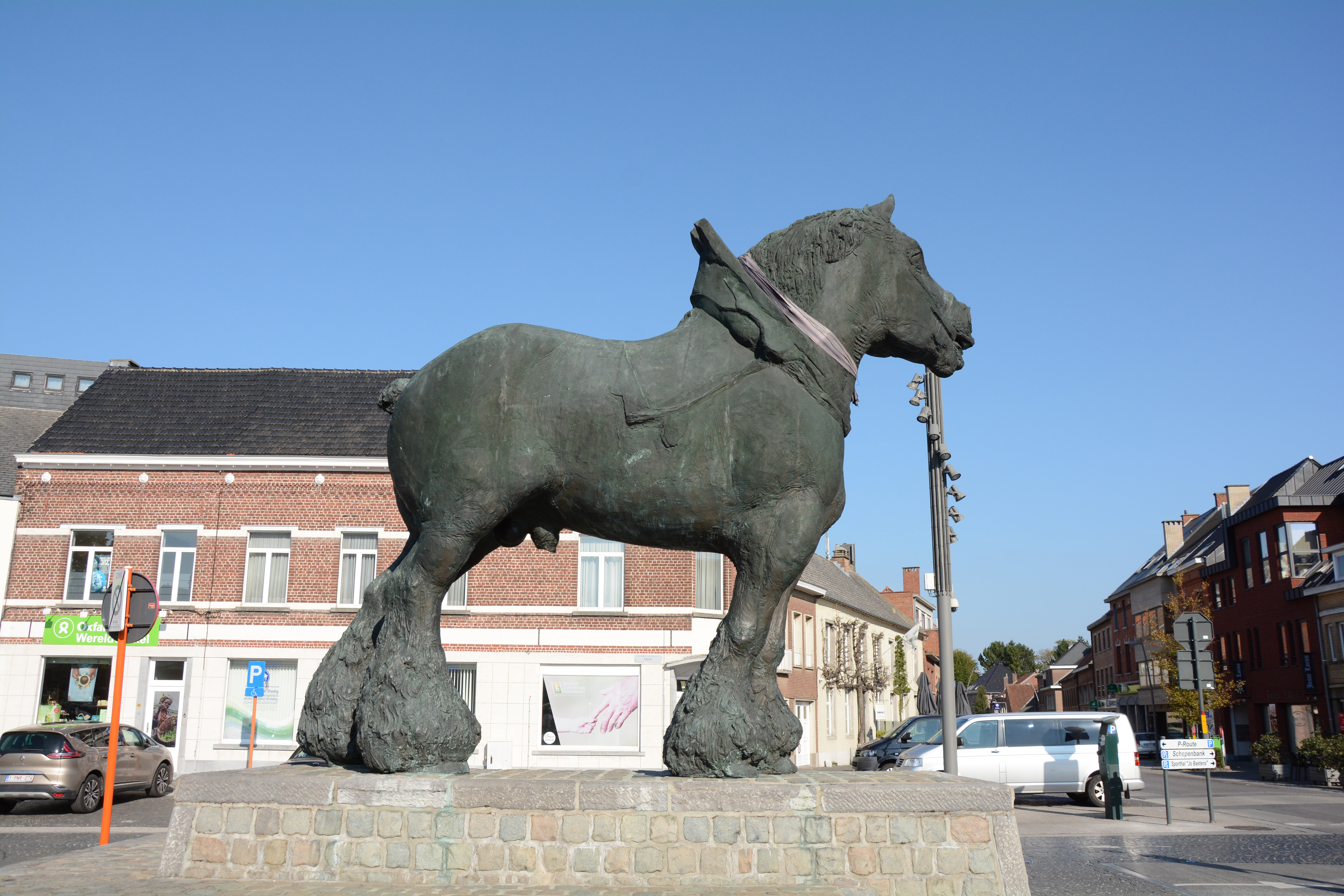
Prince, the pride of Brabant
