= Hallerbos =

Forest in Belgium

Coordinates: 50.704°N 4.288°E

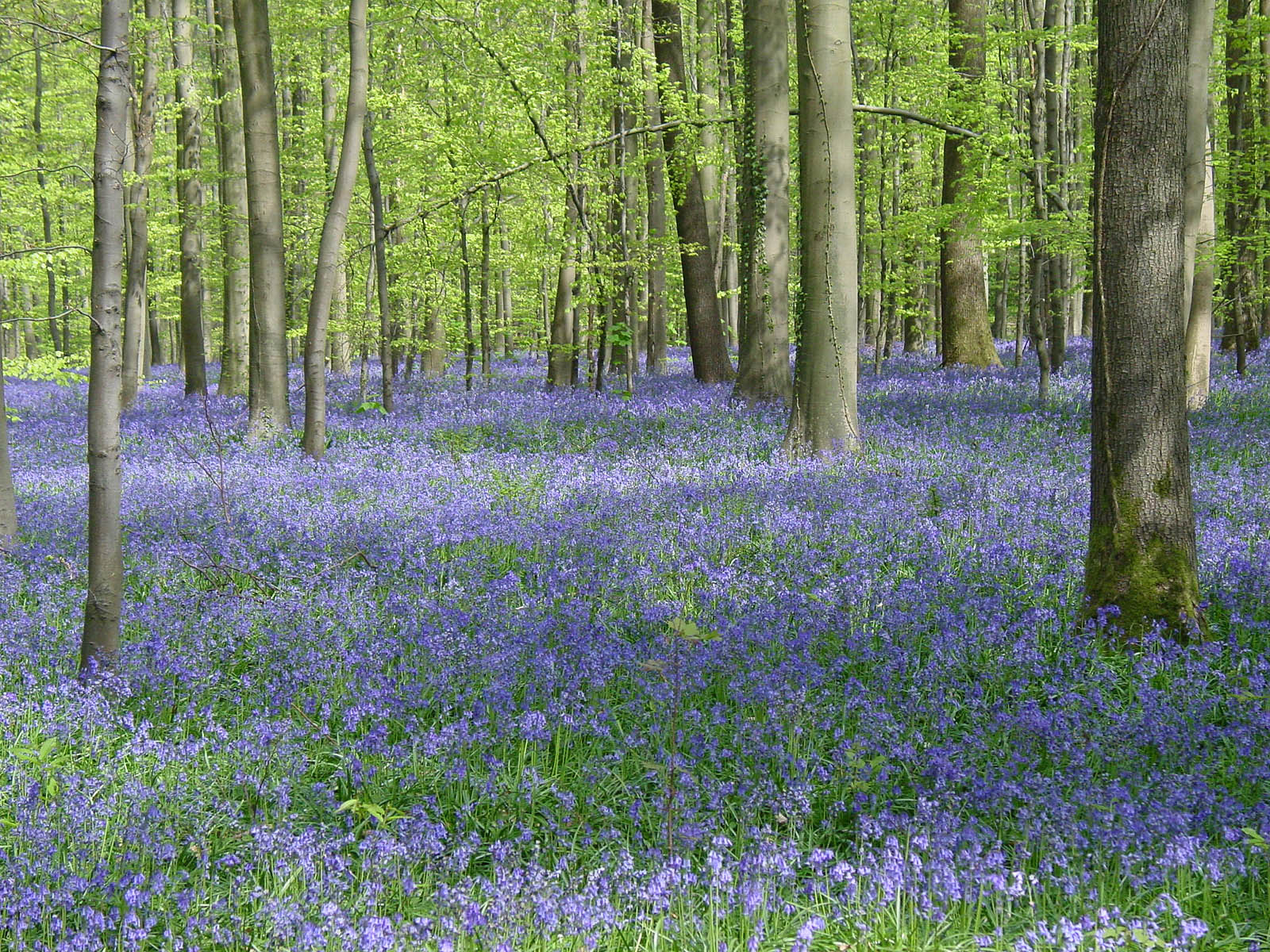
Bluebell carpet in the Hallerbos

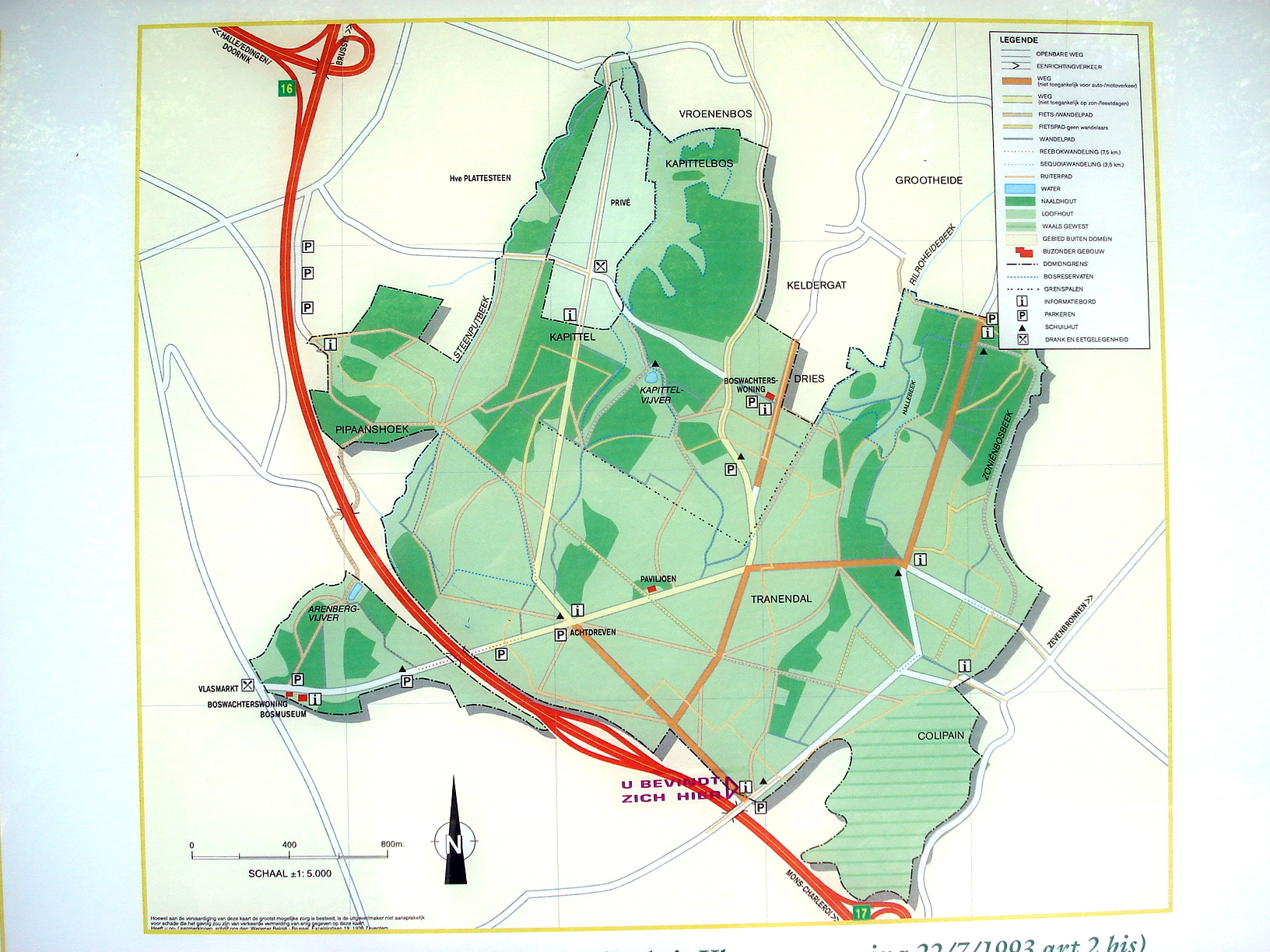
Map of the Hallerbos

The Hallerbos (Dutch for Halle forest) is a forest in Belgium, covering an area of 552 ha (1,360 acres). It is mostly situated in the municipality of Halle, in Flemish Brabant and has also a little part in Walloon Brabant.

The forest is known in the region for its bluebell carpet which covers the forest floor for a few weeks each spring, attracting many visitors.

Visitors can reach there either by their own vehicle or through public transport. For public transport, you can reach Halle railway station and get a bus to the entrance of the forest.

== History ==
Historically, the Hallerbos was part of the Silva Carbonaria, along with other forests in the vicinity including the Sonian Forest and Meerdaal. As late as 1777, it was still connected by a woodland strip to the Sonian Forest. During World War I, most of the old trees were removed by the occupying German forces. Reforestation took place from 1930 to 1950.

== Gallery ==
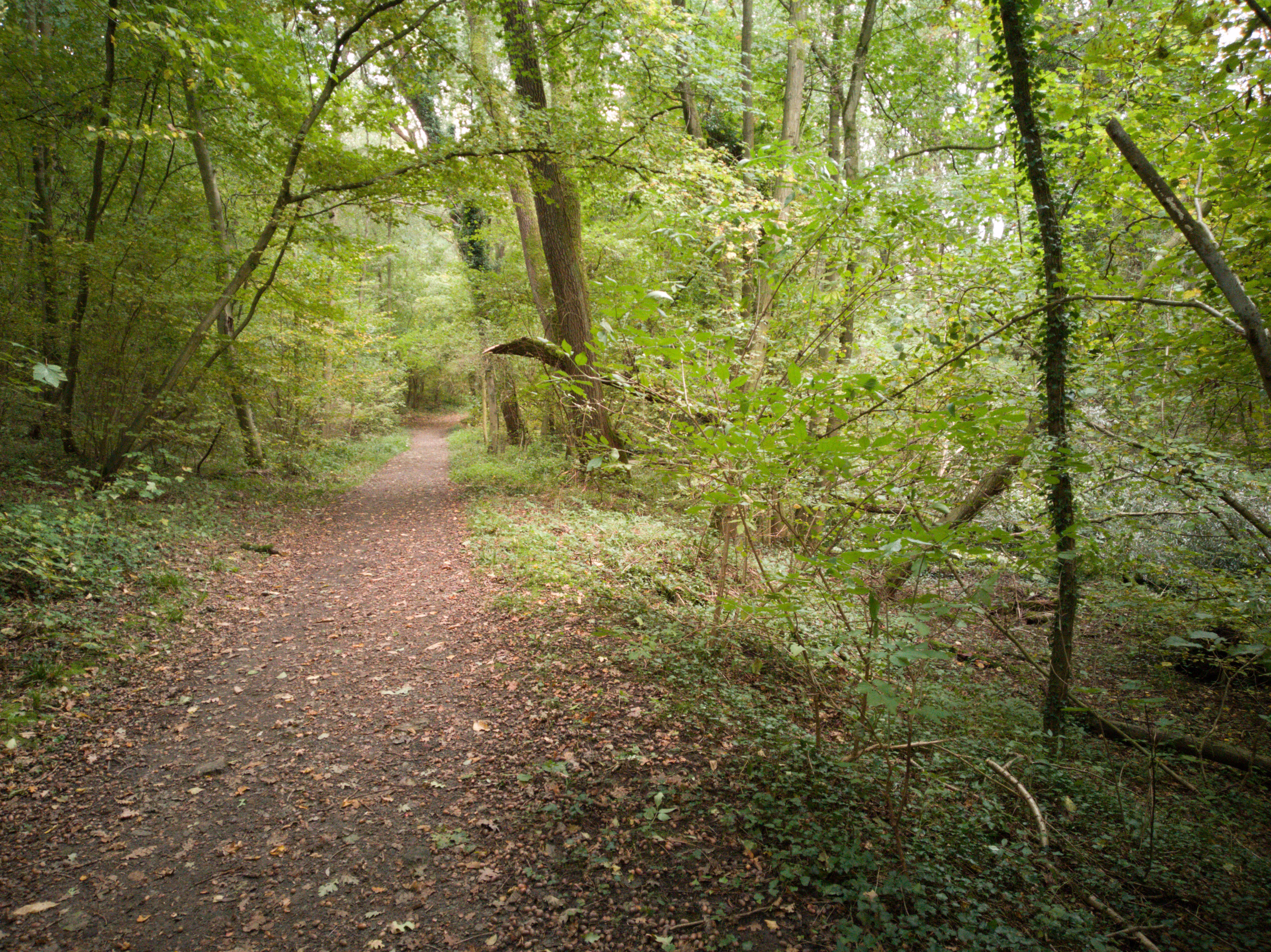
A walking path in October

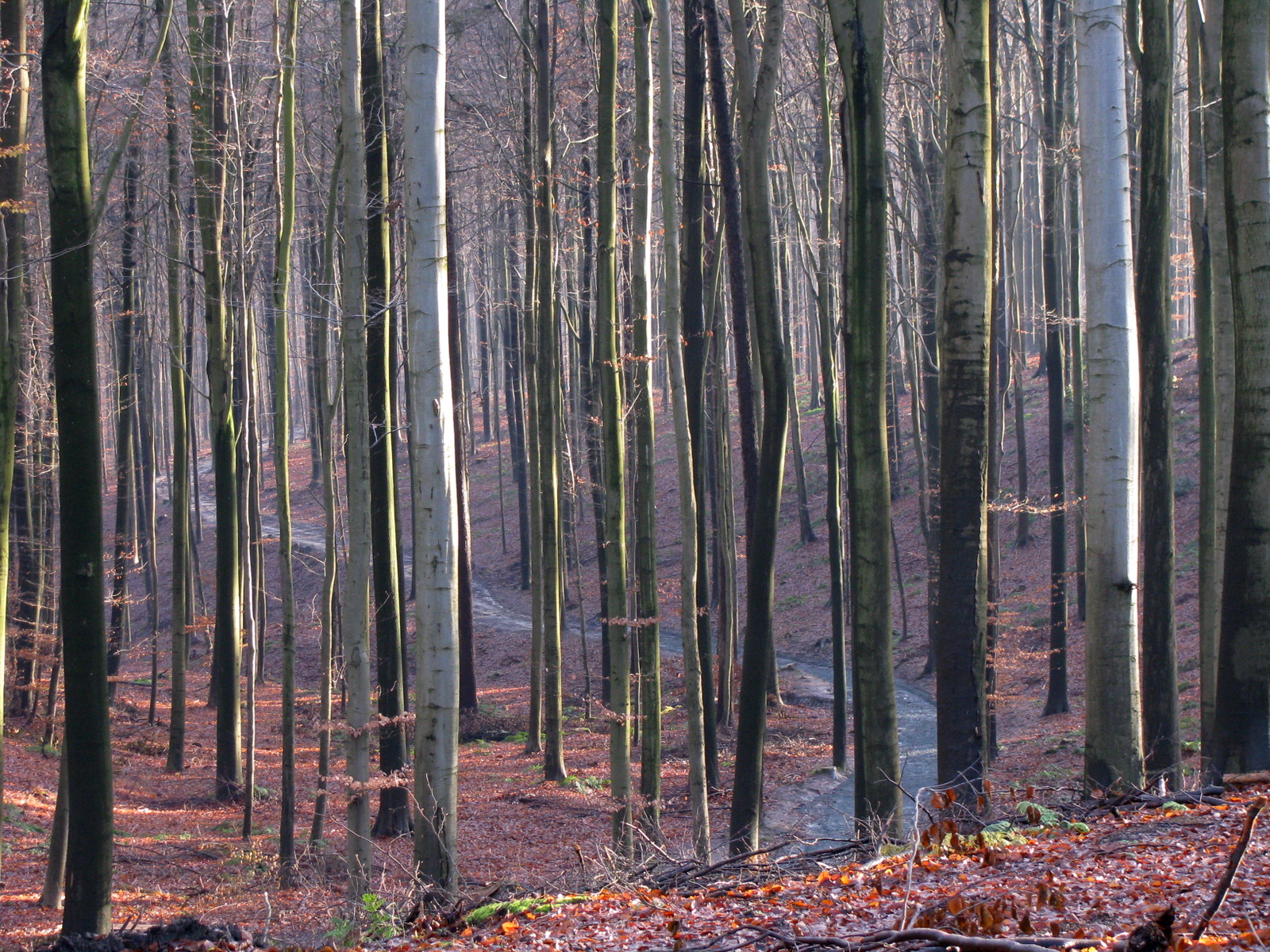
A walking path in December

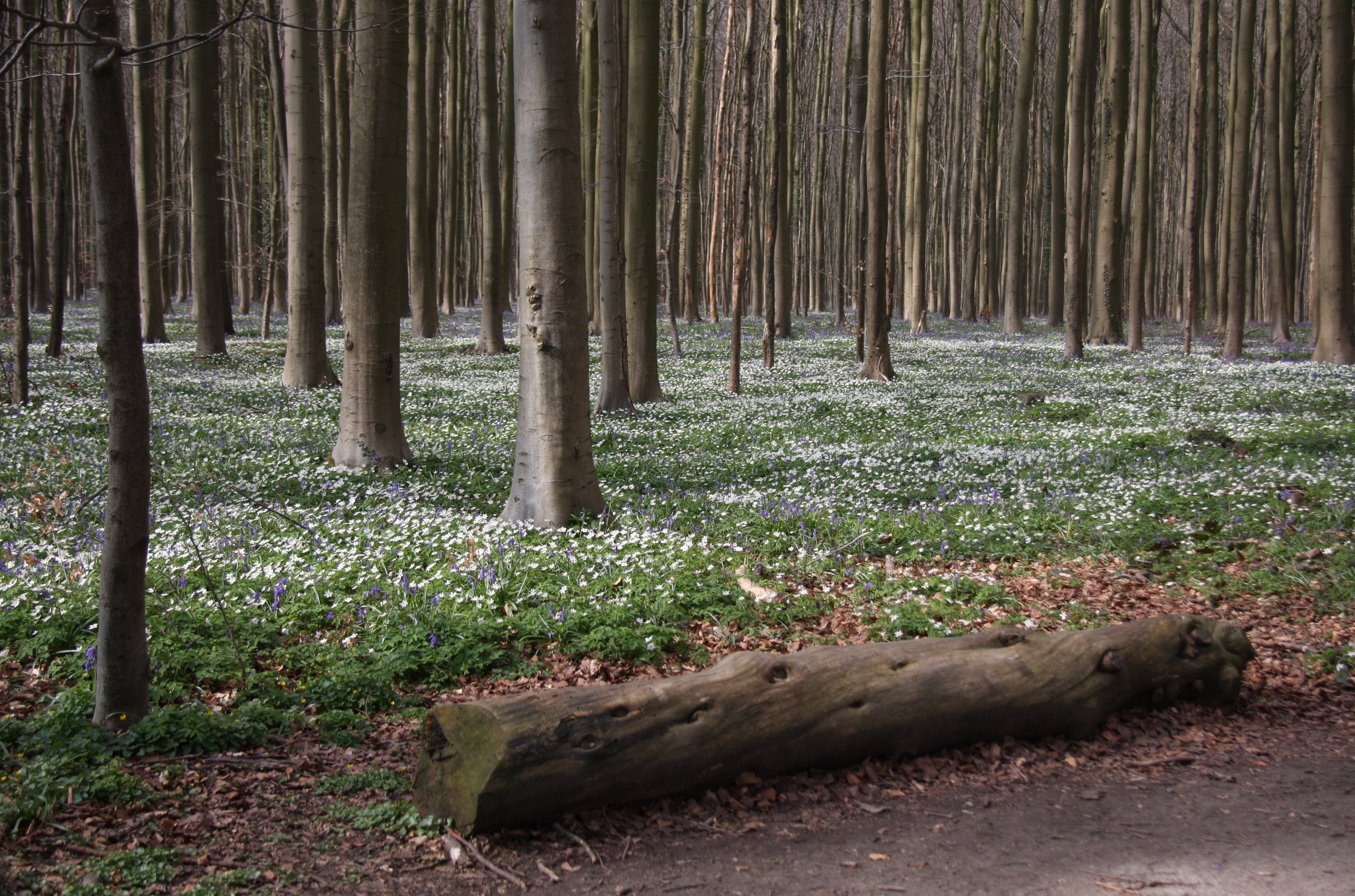
Anemone

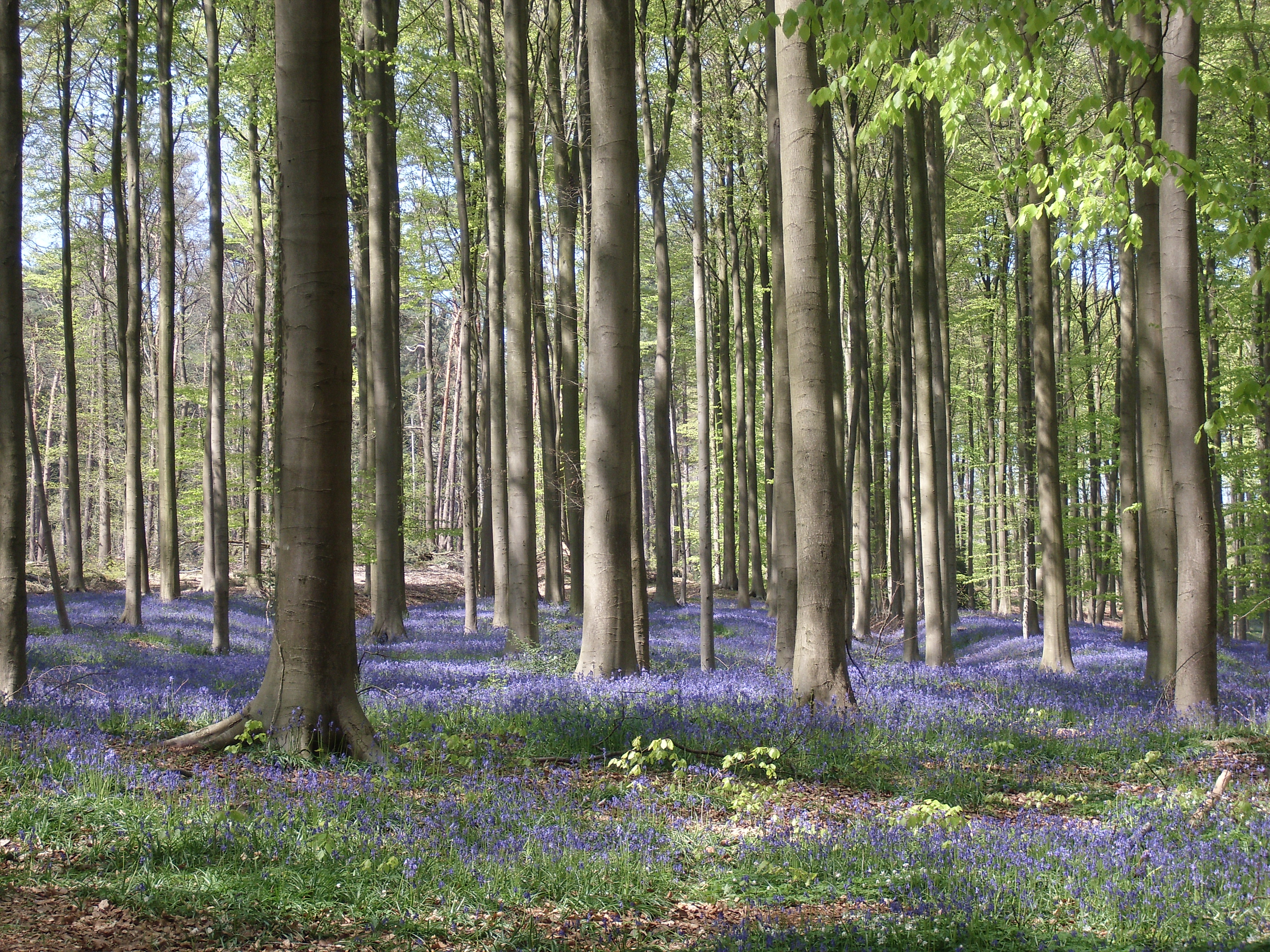
Bluebell

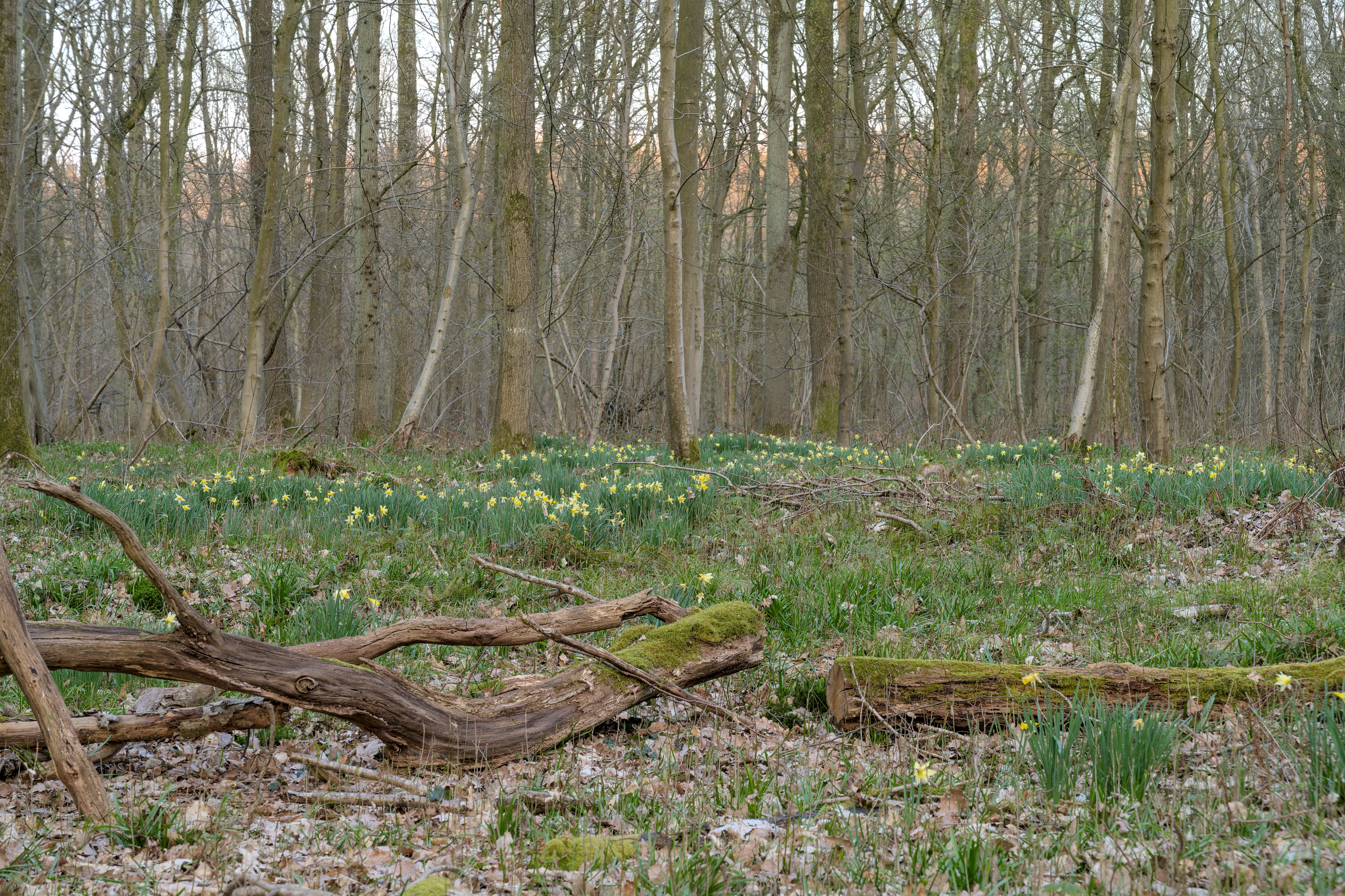
Wild daffodil

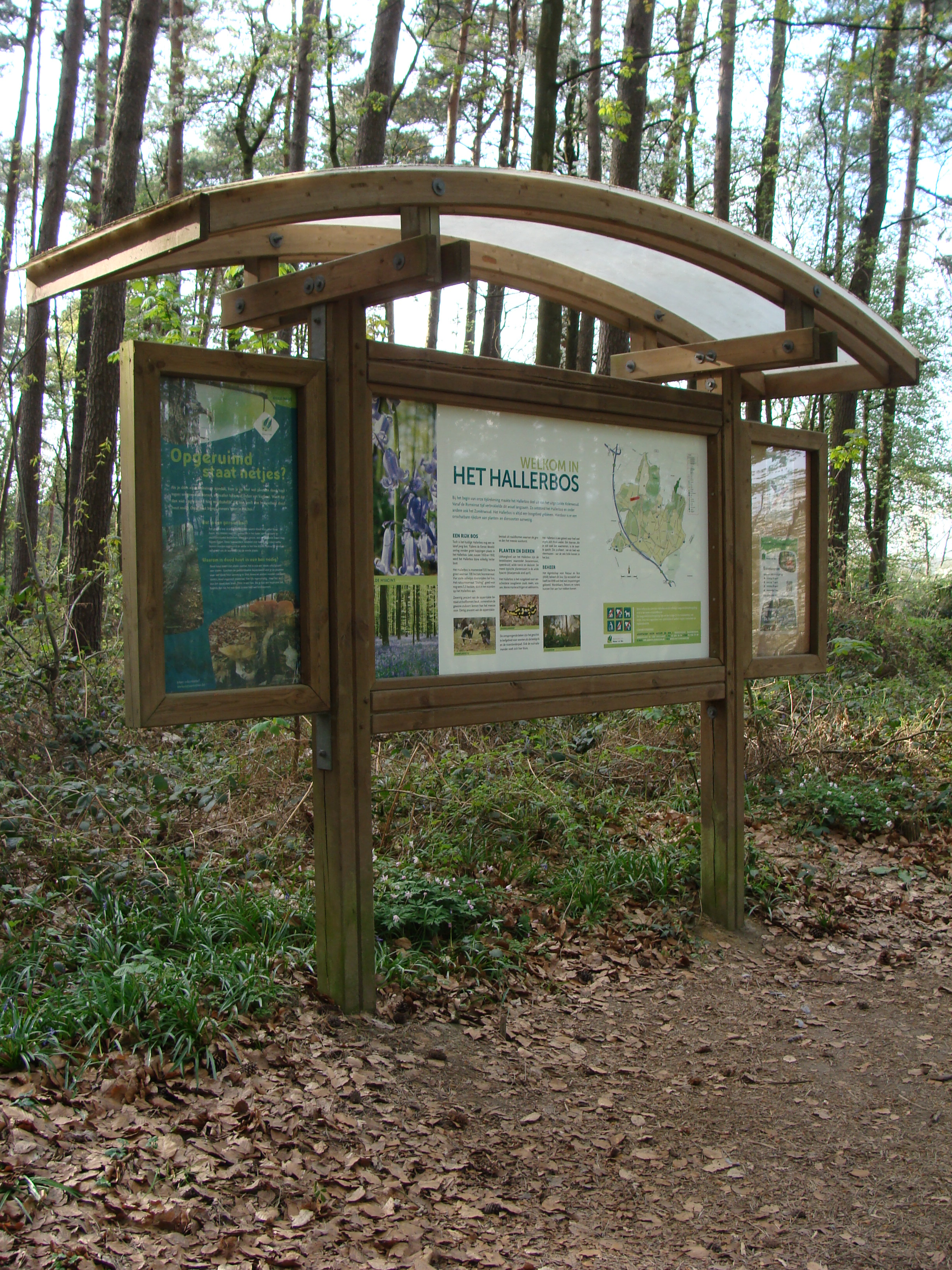
Info panel of the Hallerbos recreational area forest

== See also ==
- Bluebell wood
