= Halle, Belgium =

Halle: Hal (French)
- City and municipality
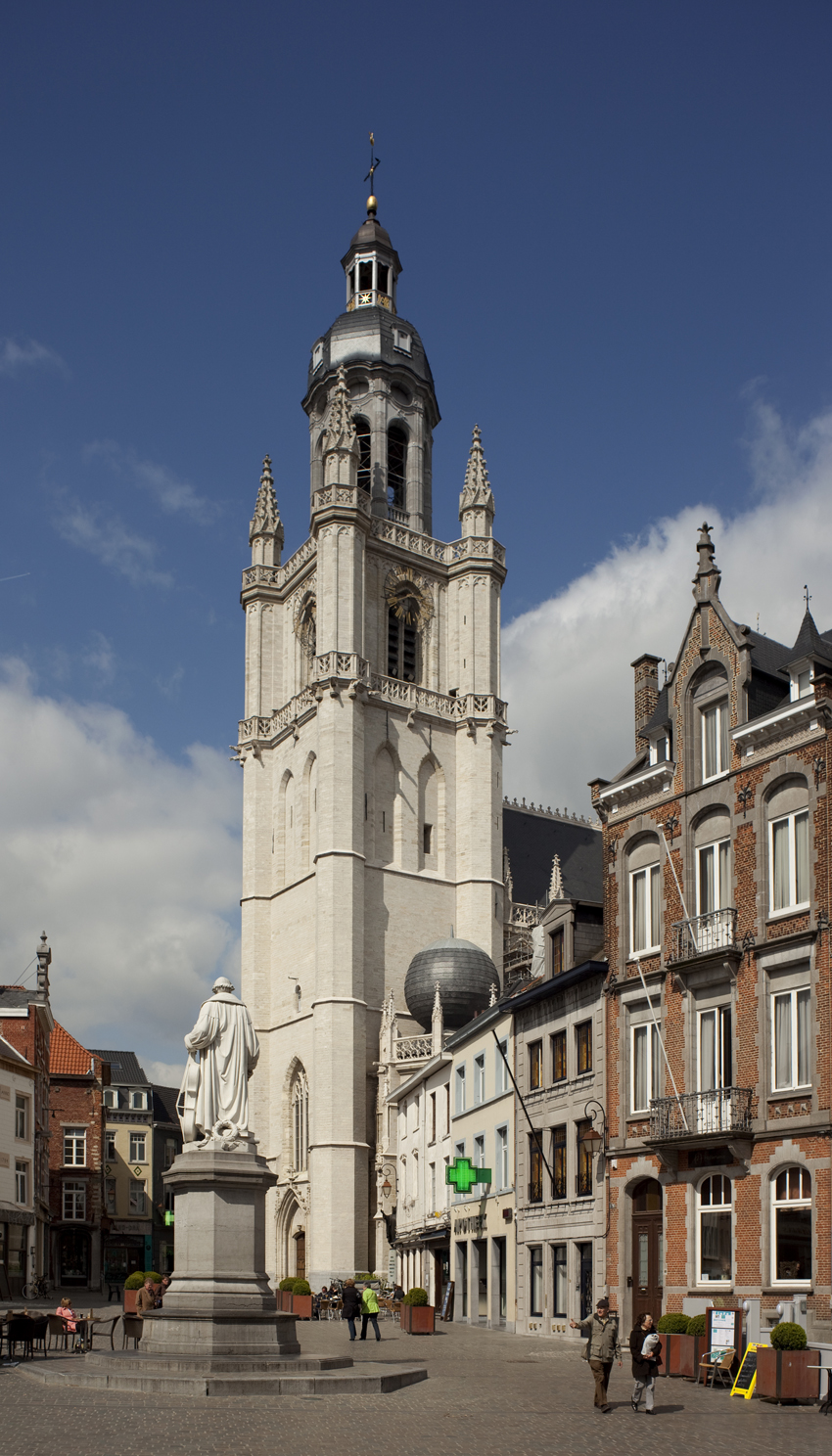
- The Grote Markt

- Flag Coat of arms

- Location of Halle in Flemish Brabant
- Interactive map of Halle
- Location in Belgium
- Coordinates: 50°44′10″N 04°14′14″E
- Country: Belgium
- Community: Flemish Community
- Region: Flemish Region
- Province: Flemish Brabant
- Arrondissement: Halle-Vilvoorde

Government
  - Mayor: Eva Demesmaeker (N-VA)
  - Governing parties: N-VA, CD&V

Area
  - Total: 44.98 km^{2} (17.37 sq mi)

Population (2018-01-01)
  - Total: 39,096
  - Density: 869.2/km^{2} (2,251/sq mi)
- Postal codes: 1500, 1501, 1502
- NIS code: 23027
- Area codes: 02
- Website: www.halle.be

Halle (Dutch pronunciation: [ˈɦɑlə]; French: Hal, pronounced [al]) is a Belgian city and municipality in the Halle-Vilvoorde district (arrondissement) of the province of Flemish Brabant. It is located on the Brussels–Charleroi Canal and on the Flemish side of the language border that separates Flanders and Wallonia. Halle lies on the border between the Flemish plains to the North (thick loam) and the undulating Brabant lands to the South (thinner loam). The city also borders on the Pajottenland to the west. It is about 22 km (14 mi) southwest of Brussels. The official language of Halle is Dutch, as in the rest of Flanders.

The municipality comprises the city of Halle proper and the towns of Buizingen and Lembeek. The neighboring towns are: Pepingen, Sint-Pieters-Leeuw, Beersel, Braine-l'Alleud, Braine-le-Château, and Tubize. The population of Halle has increased from 32,758 inhabitants in 1991 to 39,536 on 1 January 2019. The mayor is Eva Demesmaeker of the N-VA party.

== History ==
=== Antiquity and Middle Ages ===
Borders have always played an important role in the history of Halle. Already in the prehistoric era, before the Roman conquests, a tribe of Nervii – either a Germanized Celtic people or a Celticized Germanic people – lived in this region. In the 7th century, Saint Waltrude, the daughter of an important Merovingian figure, gave some of her inherited land around Halle to the chapter of the abbey which she had just founded in Mons. From that time on and until the French Revolution, the region around Halle would depend to various degrees on the County of Hainaut. In the 8th century, Hubertus, archbishop of Tongeren, founded a church dedicated to the Blessed Virgin Mary. This may have been the start of the regional devotion that continues today. The town must have grown quickly since Jeanne, Countess of Flanders and Hainaut granted its freedom charters in 1225. The miraculous statue of the Virgin was sent to Halle in 1267 as a wedding gift to John II, Count of Holland and of Hainaut. The cult of Mary attracted important visitors, such as Edward I of England and Ludwig the Bavarian, making Halle an important frontier town between Hainaut and Brabant. A larger church, dedicated to Mary, was completed in the 15th century. The death of Philipe Bold, Duke of Burgundy in Halle in 1404 benefitted the city. All subsequent ruling Dukes of Burgundy paid visits here to honor the duke's grave. In 1460 the French King Louis XI decided to bury his stillborn son in the Halle church.

=== Renaissance and modern era ===
After the death of Mary of Burgundy, Flanders, and Brabant revolted against her husband Emperor Maximilian. Hainaut, and therefore Halle, remained loyal to the Holy Roman emperor. Two attempts by a Brussels army to conquer Halle in 1489 failed.

In the 16th century, Brussels and Halle were fighting again, this time over religion. Following the Protestant Reformation, the predominately Calvinistic Brabant tried to take over Catholic Hainaut. Again, two attempts failed, leading to an increased devotion among residents to the city's miraculous statue. In 1621, with the support of archdukes Albert and Isabella, the Jesuits were invited to establish educational institutions in the city, expanding their religious influence.

Philip IV of Spain used his stake in Halle and the surrounding area as a warrant against a loan; in 1648 he was forced to cede the city to the Duke of Arenberg. Louis XIV's wars at the end of the century resulted in serious losses. In the 18th century there was a resurgence in devotional and economic prosperity.

The French Revolution at the end of the century suppressed much religious practice. But the pilgrimage site and the statue were spared confiscation thanks to the initiative of the inhabitants. When Napoleon gained power, his government restored religious services. The tradition of Napoleon princely visits to the church of Halle continues until this day.

Today, Halle is a regional services and care center, offering trade, educational establishments, general hospital, and public services (61% of the active population works in the services sector).

A train collision in February 2010 in Buizingen killed around 18 people.

== Flag and arms ==
The flag of Halle was adopted on 1 October 1991; it is quartered as saltire (argent and azure). Its proportions are 2:3. If you cut the flag in two vertically and flip both sides, you get a blue lozenge, hinting at Bavaria.

On the municipal coat of arms, the first quarter shows an argent-coloured Virgin with Child on an azure background. The fourth quarter is the coat of arms of the Wittelsbach family. The second and third quarters are the coat of arms of Hainaut, accentuating Halle's position on the language border.

== Notable buildings ==
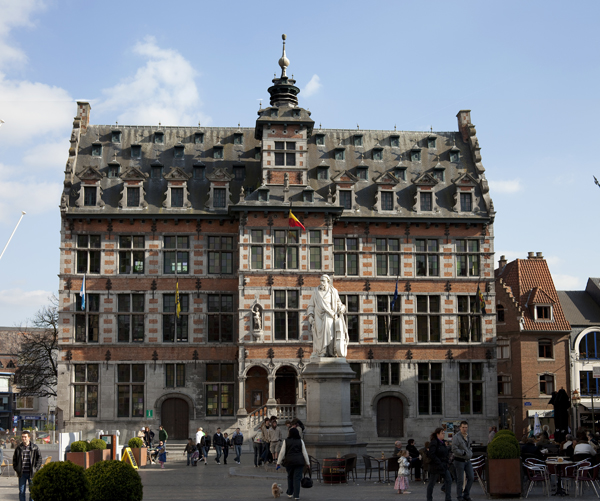
Town hall of Halle, with the statue of cellist and composer Adrien-François Servais in front.

- The Sint-Martinusbasiliek (Basilica of Saint Martin), also known as the Gothic Church of Our Lady, is a basilica in High Gothic style that has been a popular pilgrimage site since the 14th–15th century. The church contains a celebrated miraculous image of the Holy Virgin, that of a Black Madonna.
- The former city hall on the main market square (Grote Markt) dates from the Renaissance City Hall.
- The former college of the Jesuits houses a music and dance academy. For a period it had housed the museum described below.
- The South-West Brabant Museum moved to Den AST in Halle in 2014. Among its holdings are items related to the life and work of Adrien-François Servais and his son-in-law, Polish sculptor Cyprian Godebski. He created the monument to Servais that stands before the town hall.

== Events ==
- Annually at the beginning of Lent, Carnival is celebrated for three days. This is a colourful event, where various groups make floats and costumes or perform dances. The Halle carnival has been organized since 1905 and has grown to be one of the biggest carnivals in Belgium.
- On Easter Monday, the Sint-Veroonprocessie takes place. This is a religious procession where the relics of the saint are being carried around the village of Lembeek.
- Halle is the site of a popular pilgrimage to the Blessed Virgin Mary. The present format of this devotion is at least seven centuries old.
- The Hallerbos, the nearby forest named after the town, is known for the prolific bluebell carpet which covers the forest floor for a few weeks each spring, attracting many visitors.

== Notable people ==
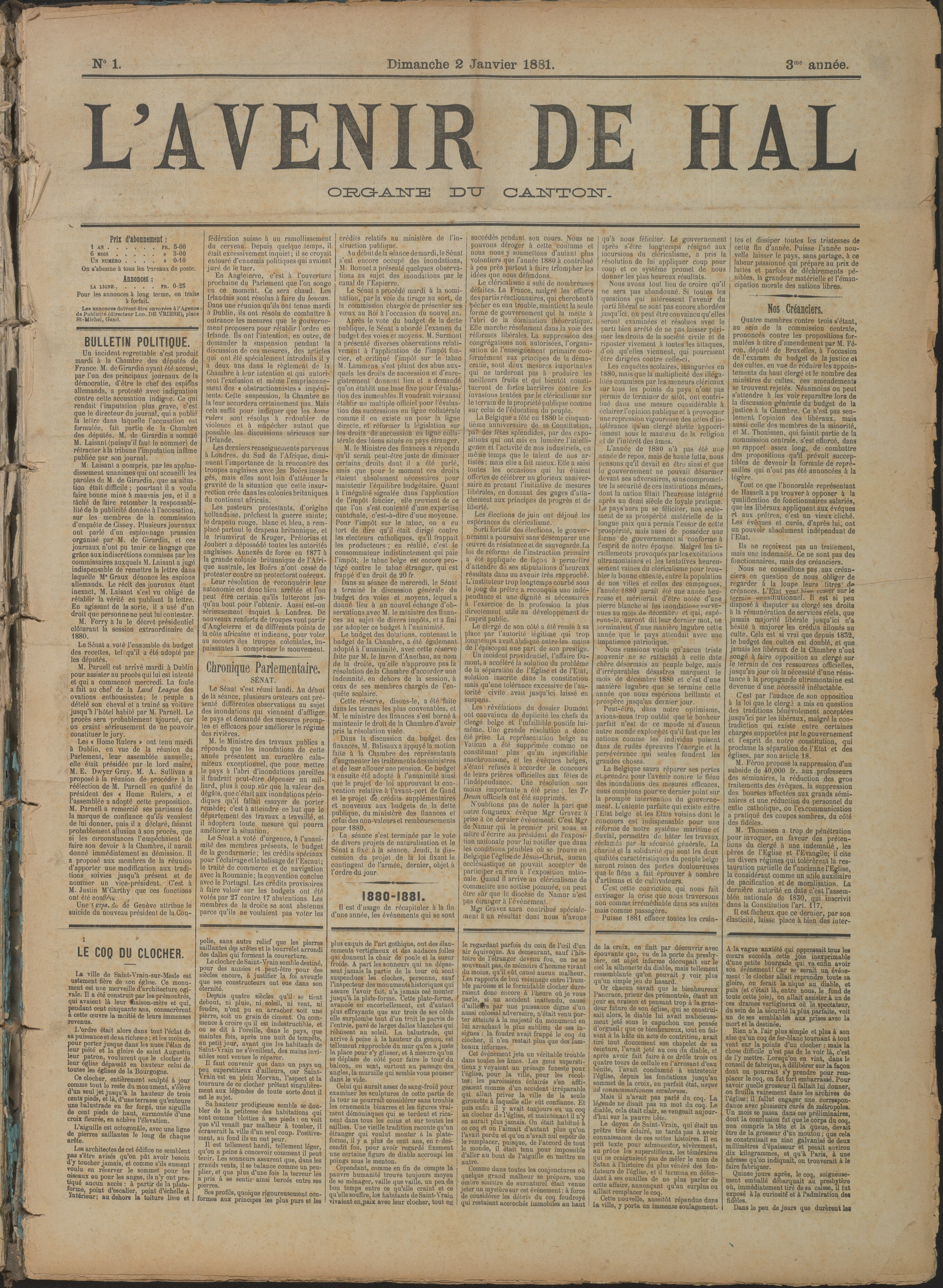
Excerpt from The Future of Halle of the year 1881. Preserved in the Ghent University Library.

- Jozef Cardijn (1882–1967), founder of the Young Christian Workers and cardinal
- Justus Lipsius (1547–1606) wrote his first historical work about Halle.
- Philip II, Duke of Burgundy (1342–1404) died in Halle.
- Adrien-François Servais (1807–1866), composer and cellist. He is commemorated by a statue on Halle's main square. It was created by his son-in-law Cyprian Godebski, a noted Polish sculptor who taught at the Institute of Imperial Art in St. Petersburg before the Revolution.
- Koen Wauters (born 1967), singer, television presenter and racing driver

== Notable products ==
- Duivelsbier, a local beer, is now brewed by the Boon Brewery.
- The famous Lambic beer is conjectured to take its name from the village of Lembeek, now part of Halle.
- Halle used to have its own newspaper, named the future of Halle. (l'Avenir de Hal)

== International relations ==
=== Twin towns – Sister cities ===
Halle is twinned with:

Czech Republic: Kadaň
Germany: Werl
France: Mouvaux, near Lille

== See also ==
- Brussels-Halle-Vilvoorde electoral district
- The Blue Forest of Halle, Belgium
- Church of Our Lady of Hal, Camden Town, London, England
