= Sigrid Goethals =

Belgian politician

Member of the Chamber of Representatives
- Incumbent
- Assumed office September 2020

Personal details
- Born: 23 March 1968 (age 58) Asse
- Citizenship: Belgium
- Party: New Flemish Alliance (N-VA)

Sigrid Goethals (born 23 March 1968) is a Belgian politician affiliated to the N-VA party.

Goethals studied pharmacy at the Vrije Universiteit Brussel and worked as a pharmacist before setting up her own practice in Ganshoren. She has described what she regards as the poor governance in Brussels and disputes between bilingual communities in the Brussels region as motivating her involvement in politics. She was elected as a municipal councilor for the N-VA in Asse in 2012 where she became an alderman. In the 2019 Belgian federal election, she stood for the Member of the Chamber of Representatives on the Flemish Brabant list but was unsuccessful at getting elected. However, in 2020 she was appointed to the Chamber to replace Jan Spooren who was ahead of her on the list.
