= Walloon Brabant (Chamber of Representatives constituency) =

- Chamber of Representatives constituency
- Walloon Brabant within Belgium

Current constituency
- Created: 2003
- Seats: 5

Walloon Brabant is a parliamentary constituency in Belgium used to elect members of the Chamber of Representatives since 2003. It corresponds to the province of Walloon Brabant.

The constituencies for the Chamber of Representatives are set by Article 87 of the Electoral Code of 1894. The number of representatives per constituency is set every ten years based on population numbers. The current distribution of representatives is set by royal order of 31 January 2013.

== Representatives ==
Representatives of Walloon Brabant (2003–present)
Election	Rep. (Party)	Rep. (Party)	Rep. (Party)	Rep. (Party)	Rep. (Party)
2003	Brigitte Wiaux (CDH)	Charles Michel (MR)	Jean-Pierre Malmendier (MR)	Valérie De Bue (MR)	Véronique Ghenne (PS)
2007	Brigitte Wiaux (CDH)	Jacques Otlet (MR)	Thérèse Snoy (Ecolo)	Valérie De Bue (MR)	André Flahaut (PS)
2010	Laurent Louis (PP)	Charles Michel (MR)	Thérèse Snoy (Ecolo)	Valérie De Bue (MR)	André Flahaut (PS)
2014	Emmanuel Burton (MR)	Vincent Scourneau (MR)	Marcel Cheron (Ecolo)	Sybille de Coster-Bauchau (MR)	Stéphane Crusnière (PS)
2019	Emmanuel Burton (MR)	Charles Michel (MR)	Simon Moutquin (Ecolo)	Florence Reuter (MR)	André Flahaut (PS)
2024	Mattieu Michel (MR)	Vincent Scourneau (MR)	Yves Coppieters (Les Engagés)	Florence Reuter (MR)	Dimitri Legasse (PS)
