= Kemal Bilmez =

Belgian politician (born 1994)

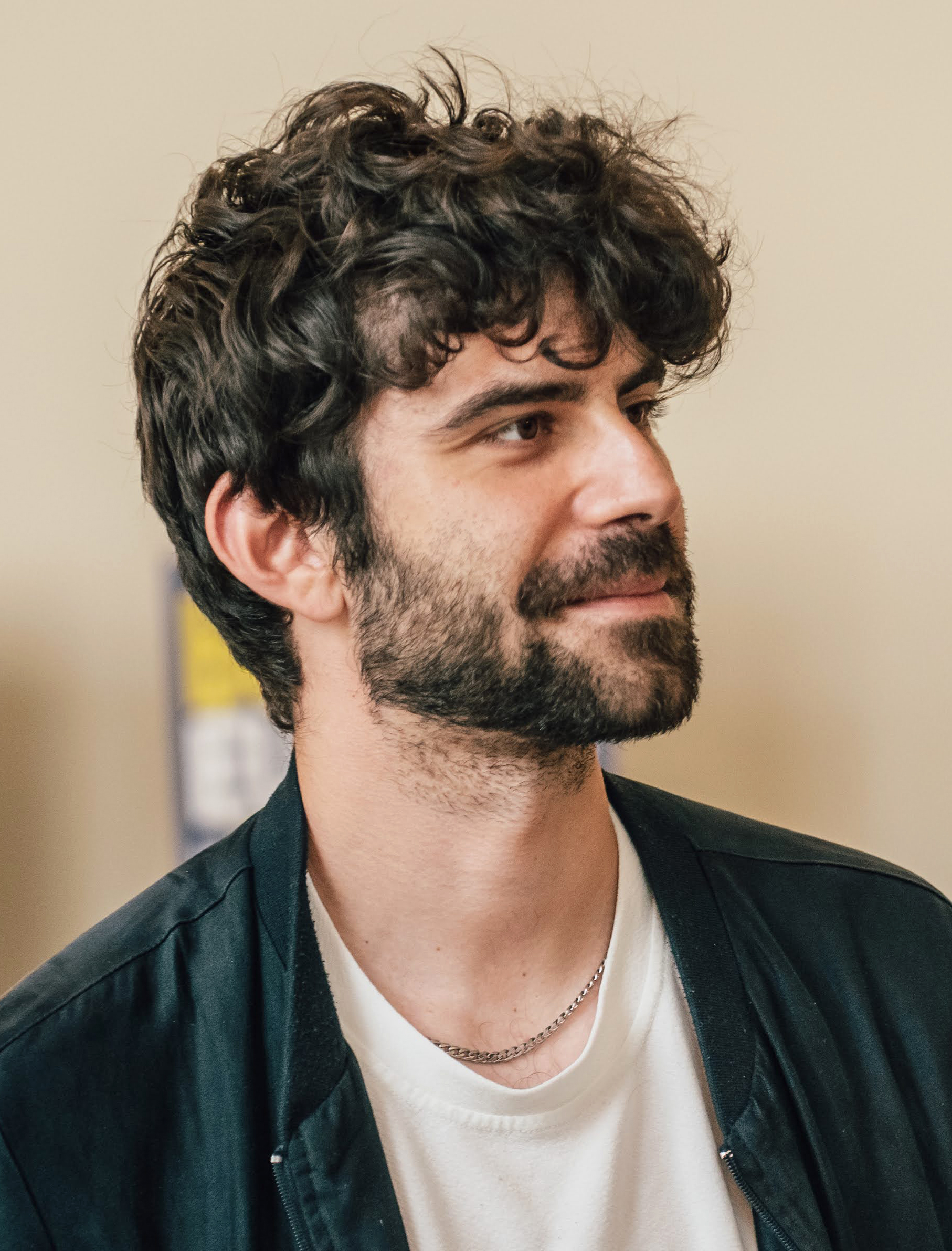
- Bilmez in June 2024

Member of the Chamber of Representatives
- Incumbent
- Assumed office 9 June 2024
- Constituency: Flemish Brabant

Personal details
- Born: 12 February 1994 (age 32) Woluwe-Saint-Lambert, Belgium
- Party: Workers' Party of Belgium

Kemal Bilmez (born 12 February 1994) is a Belgian politician and member of the Chamber of Representatives. A member of the Workers' Party of Belgium, he has represented Flemish Brabant since June 2024.

Bilmez was born on 12 February 1994 in Woluwe-Saint-Lambert and is of Turkish origin. He is from Dilbeek in Flemish Brabant and was a youth leader for Chiro and a board member of a youth centre in Groot-Bijgaarden. He worked nights as a parcel sorter for DHL at Brussels Airport but following a work accident his employment contract was not renewed. He later worked for the Delhaize supermarket chain.

Bilmez is a member of the Workers' Party of Belgium (PVDA) and helped found its branch in Dilbeek. He was elected to the Chamber of Representatives at the 2024 federal election, receiving 17,297 preference votes.
