= Dries Van Langenhove =

Belgian political activist

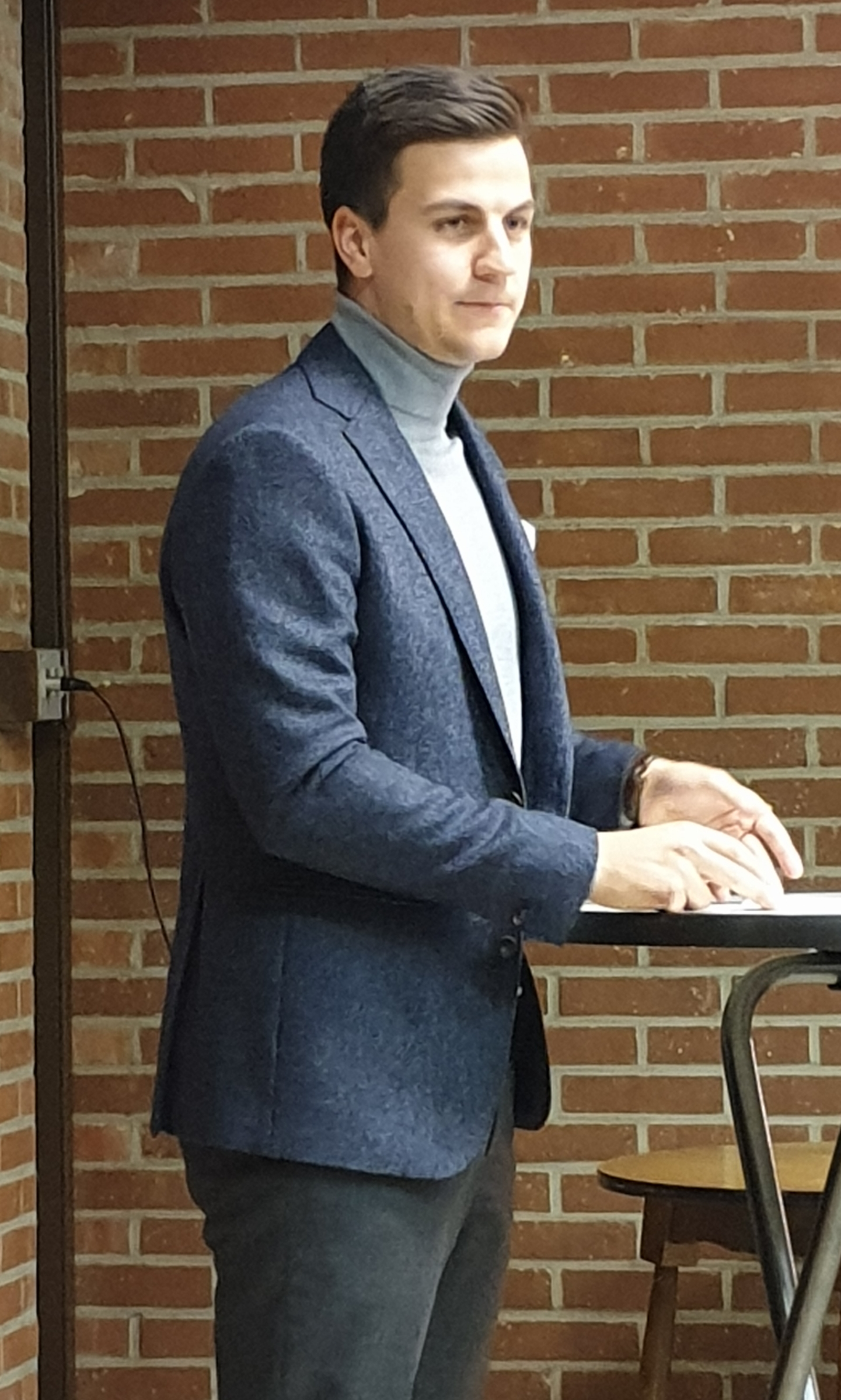

Member of the Chamber of Representatives
- In office 20 June 2019 – 4 February 2023
- Succeeded by: Joris De Vriendt
- Constituency: Flemish Brabant

Personal details
- Born: Dries Van Langenhove; 11 May 1993 (age 33) Dendermonde, Belgium
- Party: Vlaams Belang (Note: Affiliated non-member)
- Education: Ghent University
- Website: kiesdries.be

Dries Van Langenhove (born 11 May 1993) is a Belgian political activist and former politician. He is known for his far-right views and actions.

Van Langenhove is the founder and leader of the far-right Flemish nationalist youth organization Schild & Vrienden.

From 2019 to 2023, Van Langenhove sat as an "independent member" of the Vlaams Belang faction in the Chamber of Representatives.

== Early life ==
Van Langenhove was born in Dendermonde and grew up in Opwijk. He initially started studying political science at Ghent University. Meanwhile, he trained as a plumber. After obtaining his bachelor degree, he began studying law at the same university.

== Politics ==
Van Langenhove was active in the Conservative and Flemish nationalist student fraternity Katholiek Vlaams Hoogstudentenverbond. When a lecture by State Secretary Theo Francken at the Vrije Universiteit Brussel was cancelled in 2017 after left-wing protesters disrupted the event, Van Langenhove mobilized supporters from an online group to organize further Theo Francken events. Until August 2017 he wrote about migration and integration for the conservative website SCEPTR.

Along with Vlaams Belang Jongeren and the NSV he helped to organise a demonstration in Brussels against the UN Global Compact on Migration. In 2018, he also led a counter-demonstration alongside YouTube commentator Lauren Southern. Van Langenhove and Schild en Vrienden members disrupted pro-immigration activists at Gravensteen castle calling for more humane refugee policies. The counter-demonstration was filmed and posted on Facebook.

In 2019, Van Langenhove announced he was to stand as an independent MP for the Chamber of Representatives in the 2019 Federal election, and it was later confirmed by Tom Van Grieken that he would run for the Vlaams Belang party (despite not being a full member) and head the VB's list in the Flemish Brabant region. He was elected to the Chamber as an independent with 39,295 preference votes, working with the Vlaams Belang faction.

In February 2023, Van Langenhove announced in a press conference with Van Grieken that he would resign from the Chamber of Representatives. He stated that his work in parliament had yielded very little and believed activism and social media work would make the greatest difference for the Flemish people.

== Social media ==
In April 2021, Van Langenhove started a YouTube channel called Kies Dries where he discusses current events and politics.

== Controversies ==
In 2017, Van Langenhove set up a youth movement called Schild & Vrienden which shared right-wing memes and participated in political demonstrations. An investigation by the Belgian TV show Pano and journalist Tim Verheyden found that members of the group were sharing racist, antisemitic and sexist content and memes on Facebook and Discord groups. In these groups, Verheyden also encountered posts promoting violence, as well as references to Nazi Germany. The group was also investigated under potential breaches of the 1981 anti-racism law. As a result of the investigation Van Langenhove, who denied involvement in sharing content in any of the groups, was temporarily suspended as a student by Ghent University.

On 25 November 2020, the judicial investigation was concluded by investigating judge Annemie Serlippens and communicated to the public prosecutor's office. The public prosecutor's office then asked the Chamber of Representatives to refer Van Langenhove to the criminal court. On 21 January 2021 the public prosecutor's office asked parliament to lift the parliamentary immunity of Van Langenhove due to an investigation into breaching of the anti-racism law, the Belgian Holocaust denial law and weapon law. Van Langenhoven and eight other core members of Schild en Vrienden were to appear in the Ghent court on 25 April 2022. However, Van Langenhove submitted a request of recusal against Serlippens citing political bias, claiming that she had previously liked and retweeted a poem on Twitter referring to him and former immigration minister Theo Francken as "rancid" and "fascist." Serlippens subsequently withdrew from the judicial investigation as a result and a new investigating judge was appointed. A fresh appeal made by Van Langenhove to investigate political impartiality in the trial was refused by the new judge and the Belgian Court of appeal. In September 2021, Van Langenhove's lawyer requested that certain investigative actions against him be annulled on grounds of bias and breach of privacy. In 2023, the trial against Van Langenhove and Schild & Vrienden was scheduled for September. In March 2024, he received a 1-year prison term for inciting violence, and was banned from running for elected political office for ten years. In June 2025, the Court of Appeal upheld the guilty verdict, but suspended the prison sentence due to delay. His further appeal was rejected by the Cours de Cassation in January 2026.
