= Brantano Footwear =

Brantano N.V.
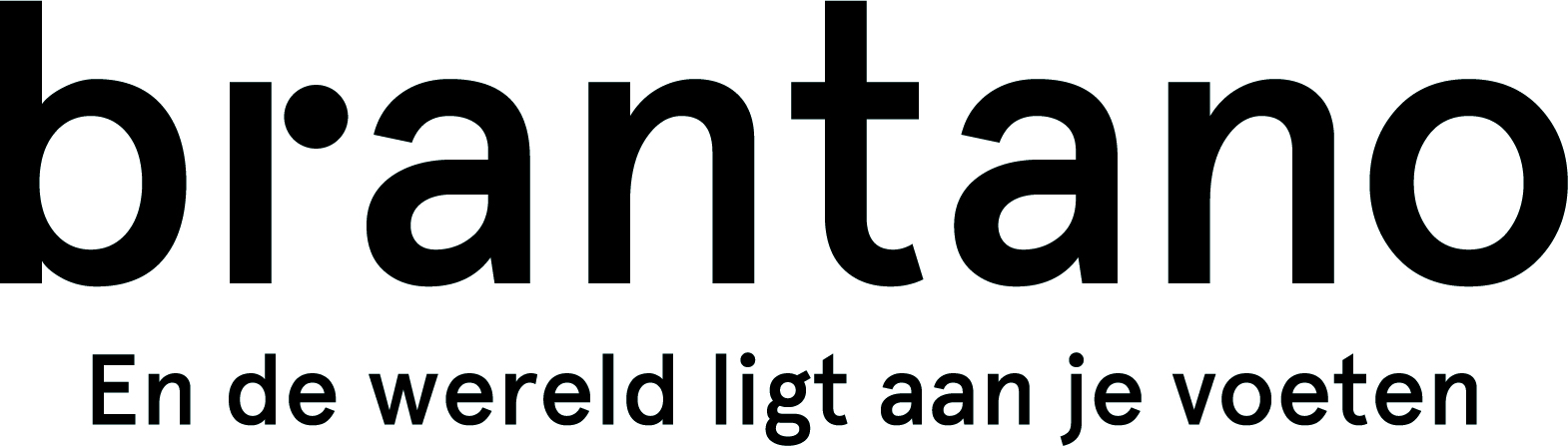
- Company type: Public
- Industry: Retail
- Founded: 1962
- Defunct: 2017 (UK division); 2022 (Belgium division)
- Headquarters: Lede, Belgium
- Number of locations: 286 stores
- Area served: Europe, Middle East
- Key people: André Brantegem, Founder
- Products: Footwear
- Revenue: ▼€295.2 million (FY 2006)
- Operating income: ▲€35.9 million (FY 2006)
- Net income: ▼€29.5 million (FY 2006)
- Number of employees: 2,945
- Parent: Brantano N.V. (1962-2007); Macintosh Retail Group (2007-2016)
- Website: www.brantano.be/nl/

Brantano Footwear (Brantano, en de wereld ligt aan je voeten (English: Brantano, and the world is at your feet)) was a European chain of retail stores specialising in footwear for men, women and children, that was founded in Belgium.

It went into administration in March 2017. The stores closed in June 2017 with the loss of over 900 jobs.

== Origin ==
The company originated from a small factory run by André Brantegem and his brother in Lede, East Flanders. The Brantegem brothers were sons of a cobbler. They specialised in ladies' shoes which they sold to wholesalers and retailers in Belgium. Eventually the brothers separated and in 1962 André initiated a retail outlet at the factory. This evolved into the Brantano chain of shoe shops.

Brantano closed its Dutch and Danish stores in 2005, and subsequently liquidated its French stores.

In 2007, Dutch holding company Macintosh Retail Group took over ownership of Brantano. In 2015, Macintosh sold the Brantano UK subsidiary to Alteri Investors. In 2018, Macintosh sold Brantano to FNG N.V.. FNG N.V. filed for bankruptcy on 30 July 2020. After a failed attempt at relaunching its brands, including Brantano, FNG N.V. filed for bankruptcy for a second time in February 2022 and subsequently liquidated its assets.

== Subsidiaries ==
- Brantano Luxembourg SA, operates stores in Luxembourg.
- Brimmo NV and Muys NV, operates stores in Belgium.
