= Katrien Houtmeyers =

Belgian politician

Flemish Parliament
- Incumbent
- Assumed office 2nd July 2024

Personal details
- Born: 22 January 1981 (age 45) Leuven, Belgium
- Citizenship: Belgium
- Party: New Flemish Alliance (N-VA)
- Education: KU Leuven

Katrien Houtmeyers (born 22 January 1981) is a Belgian businesswoman and politician active within the N-VA party.

== Biography ==
Houtmeyers was born and raised in Leuven, Belgium. In 2003, she obtained a master's degree in psychology at the KU Leuven. She founded a communications company before becoming the co-owner of a garden furniture store. In the Belgian municipal elections of 2018, she was elected municipal councilor in Leuven. Since the 2019 Belgian federal election, she has served as an MP in the Chamber of Representatives for the Flemish Brabant constituency. During the Belgian regional elections of 9 June 2024 Houtmeyers was elected as MP in the Flemish Parliament.
