= Katleen Bury =

Flemish politician

Member of the Chamber of Representatives
- Incumbent
- Assumed office 2019

Personal details
- Born: Katleen Bury; 14 October 1983 (age 42) Ostend, Belgium
- Party: Vlaams Belang (2019-present); New Flemish Alliance (2009-2019)

Katleen Bury (born 14 October 1983) is a Belgian politician and lawyer who has been a member of the Chamber of Representatives for the Vlaams Belang party since 2019.

Bury was a professional lawyer at the Bar of Brussels. She was also an advisor for the Vlaamse Rand on several cabinets of N-VA ministers in the Flemish Government: from 2009 to 2014, with Geert Bourgeois and from 2014 to 2019, with Ben Weyts. Bury was also a municipal councilor in Sint-Pieters-Leeuw and provincial councilor in Flemish Brabant from 2012 to 2018 for the N-VA.

In January 2019, Bury left the N-VA and switched to Vlaams Belang. She stood in second place on the Flemish Brabant parliamentary list in the federal elections of 26 May 2019, and was elected to the Chamber of Representatives.
