= Belgische Unie – Union Belge =

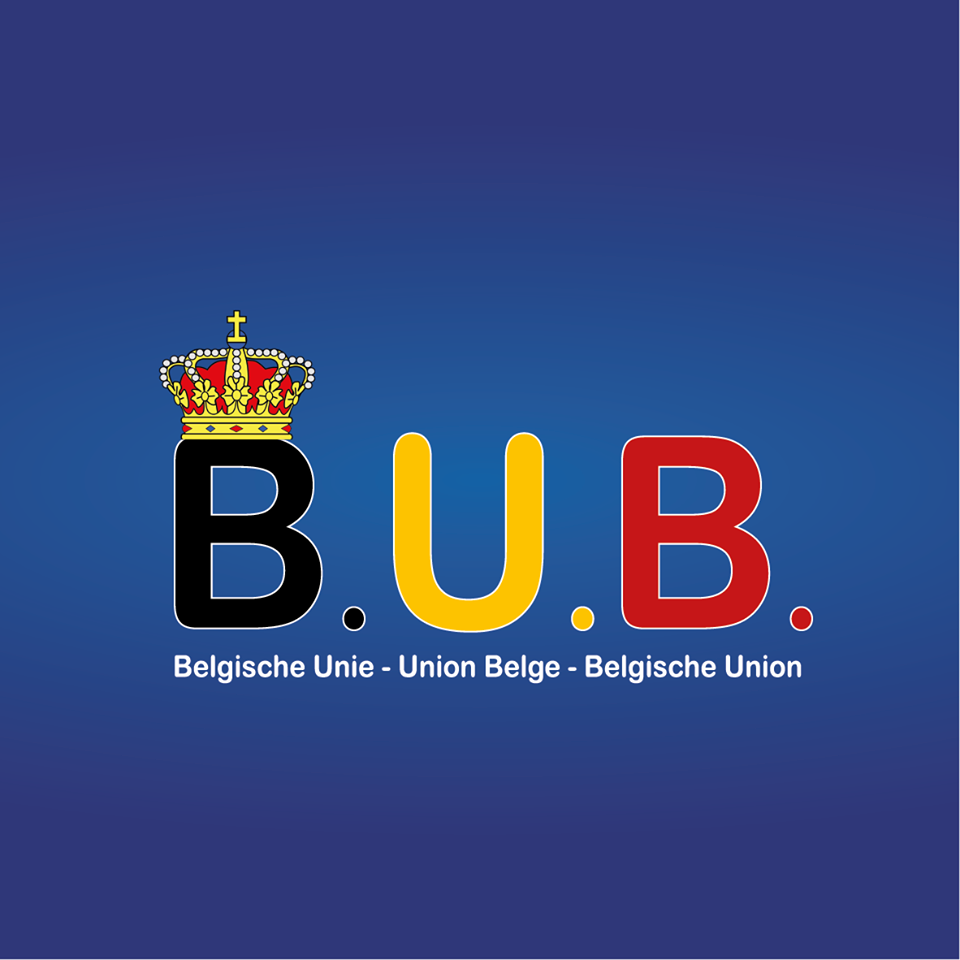
- Leader: Hans Van De Cauter
- Headquarters: Rue du Merlo 8B; B-1180 Brussels
- Ideology: Political unitarism Monarchism
- International affiliation: International Monarchist Conference
- Chamber of Representatives: 0 / 150
- Senate: 0 / 60
- Flemish Parliament: 0 / 124
- Brussels Parliament: 0 / 89
- European Parliament: 0 / 21

Website
- www.belgischeunie.be

Belgische Unie – Union Belge (Dutch and French for Belgian Union), known by the acronym BUB, is a small political party in Belgium. It describes itself as "The Centrist Party for a United Belgium". As one of the only political parties organised across the entire country, it wishes to abolish the federal system in Belgium and re-establish a unitary state based on the original nine provinces. The party is explicitly opposed to separatism and the partition of Belgium.

== Ideology ==
The party promotes reconciliation between Belgium's language groups (the Dutch- and French-speaking communities), promoting multilingualism, and centralisation by one government and parliament. They propose the abolition of the three Belgian Regions and transfer their powers back to the federal state of Belgium and the provinces. They are the only party with this outlook, as all other Belgian parties except for the Workers' Party of Belgium (PVDA/PTB), Left Socialist Party, and minor liberal grouping "Vivant" have, together with the creation of the federal states, been split on a language basis.

== Representation ==
The BUB has no elected seats at any level and operates only on the margins of Belgian politics. The party got 10,000 votes in the 2003 federal elections and 13,000 votes in the 2004 regional elections. The votes were concentrated in the northern provinces, in the central constituencies of Brabant and Brussels and in 2003 also in the southern province of Namur. Though the party did not gain any seats in the 2006 communal elections, BUB did far better at the ballots, gaining up to 2% of the vote in some cities. In the federal elections of 10 June 2007, the pro-Belgian party also progressed everywhere it participated but again obtained no seats.

At the 2010 federal elections, the party formed a pro-Belgian cartel with CDF under the name BELG-UNIE and obtained a record result of 20.000 votes in 5 constituencies. Since 22 June 2011, the cartel consists of a third pro-Belgian party, the BAB.

The party is headed by a national president (Hans Van de Cauter) and is divided into 9 provincial sections, corresponding with the 9 provinces that existed before the split of the central province of Brabant in 1995.

The party is member of International Monarchist Conference.

== Election results ==
=== Chamber of Representatives ===
Election	Votes	%	Seats	+/-	Government
2003*	10,034	0.15	0 / 150	New	Extra-parliamentary
2007	8,607	0.13	0 / 150	0	Extra-parliamentary
2010	20,665	0.32	0 / 150	0	Extra-parliamentary
2014	12,103	0.18	0 / 150	0	Extra-parliamentary
2019	6,611	0.10	0 / 150	0	Extra-parliamentary
2024	15,780	0.23	0 / 150	0	Extra-parliamentary
