= Britt Huybrechts =

Belgian politician (born 1999)

Member of the Chamber of Representatives
- Incumbent
- Assumed office 2024

Personal details
- Born: Britt Huybrechts; 8 February 1999 (age 27) Lommel, Belgium
- Party: Vlaams Belang (2018-present); New Flemish Alliance (2018)
- Education: Catholic University of Leuven

Britt Huybrechts (born 8 February 1999 in Lommel) is a Belgian politician of the Vlaams Belang party who has been a deputy in the Belgian Chamber of Representatives for the Flemish Brabant constituency since 2024.

== Biography ==
Huybrechts studied at the Catholic University of Leuven where she obtained a master's degree in history, followed by a master's degree in educational sciences. From 2021 to 2023, she worked as a history teacher.

During her studies at Leuven, Huybrechts was active in the Katholiek Vlaams Hoogstudentenverbond (KVHV) and became the first female president of the organization in 2022. Initially, she campaigned for the New Flemish Alliance party and unsuccessfully stood as a candidate for the N-VA in Leopoldsburg during the 2018 Belgian municipal elections. She later joined Vlaams Belang after arguing the N-VA had lost interest in Flemish nationalism. In 2024, she started working for the policy research department of Vlaams Belang and became a secretary for the Vlaams Belang Jongeren.

Huybrechts was the lead candidate for Vlaams Belang in the Flemish Brabant constituency during the 2024 Belgian federal election and was elected to the Chamber of Representatives. She became a member of the committees for Foreign Relations and Mobility, Public Enterprises and Federal Institutions.
