= Willy Segers =

Belgian politician

Member of the Flemish Parliament
- Incumbent
- Assumed office 7 June 2009

Personal details
- Born: 21 November 1958 (age 67) Anderlecht, Brussels-Capital Region
- Party: N-VA
- Website: http://www.n-va.be/cv/willy-segers

Willy Segers (born 21 November 1958 in Anderlecht) is a Belgian politician and is affiliated to the N-VA. He was elected as a member of the Flemish Parliament in 2009.
