= Rocket Dog =

American shoe company

Rocket Dog is an American private company that designs and manufactures women's shoes based in Hayward, California. They were founded in 1997 in Southern California, and were named after one of the two founders' pet dog, who enjoyed running on the beach. Their initial product lines emphasized beach and casual wear, and now includes a full range of women's shoe styles. Their shoes are sold in Europe and Israel as well as the US. They expanded their UK business in 2012, starting from a base of about 120 retailers there. They are known for their platform sandals.
