= Felix Strackx =

Belgian politician

Personal details
- Born: 4 February 1955 (age 71) Leuven
- Party: Vlaams Belang
- Occupation: dentist

Felix Strackx (born 4 February 1955) is a Belgian politician and a member of the Vlaams Belang party. He was a member of the Flemish Parliament from 1995 to 2014.

== Life ==
In 1978 Strackx graduated as a dentist at the Catholic University of Leuven. In August '78 he started a dental practice in Aarschot.

In January 1995 he became a provincial councillor of the newly established province of Flemish Brabant for the Vlaams Blok, but he did not remain in this position for long because he was chosen as a member of the Flemish Parliament on 21 May 1995.

He was reelected to the Parliament in 1999, 2004 and 2009, but did not stand in the elections of May 2014. In December 2014 the executive committee of the Flemish Parliament granted him the title of Honorary Member of the Flemish Parliament.

He also has been a councillor of Tremelo from January 2007 till May 2013.

Since then he lives in Ostend near the sea.

On the website of the Flemish Parliament Felix Strackx is mentioned 3768 times in reports, interventions and parliamentary initiatives, among which 32 Decree Proposals, 50 Motions for a Resolution, 133 Motions and 104 Amendments.
