= Etienne Schouppe =

Belgian politician (born 1942)

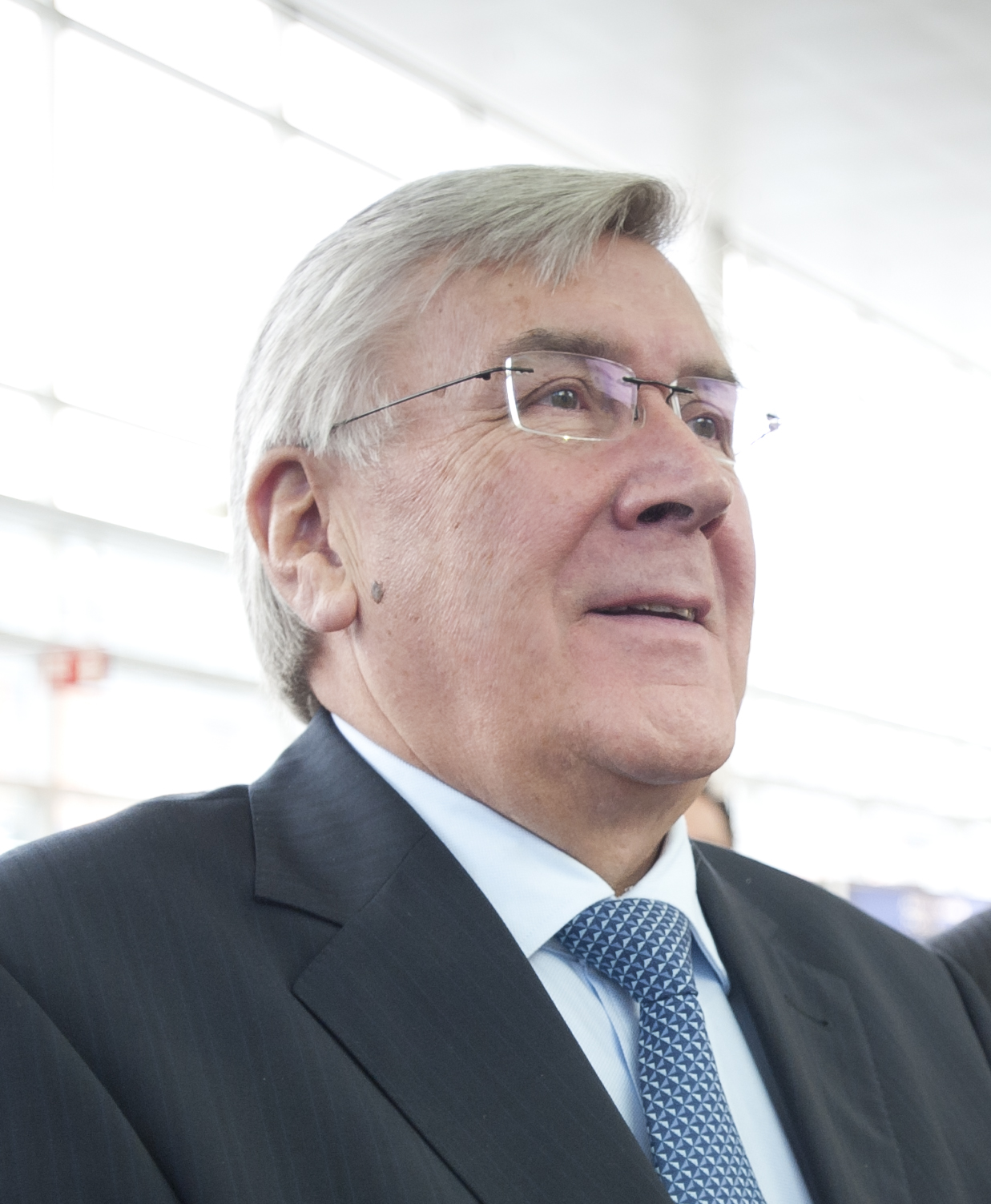
Etienne Schouppe in 2010

Etienne Adolf Schouppe (born 24 July 1942 in Denderleeuw) is a Belgian politician. He is a member of the Christen-Democratisch en Vlaams party. Before his entry into politics, he was executive manager of the National Railway Company of Belgium. Schouppe was a member of the Belgian Senate from 2003 to 2010 and since 2008 the State Secretary for Mobility. At the local level Schouppe was mayor of Liedekerke for eleven years. In 2010 he retired from politics. In 2010 he was also accused of insider trading for having sold KBC and Dexia shares with special information.

== Honours ==
- Commander in the Order of Leopold II.
