= Dimitri Legasse =

Belgian politician (born 1970)

Member of the Chamber of Representatives
- Incumbent
- Assumed office 10 July 2024
- Constituency: Walloon Brabant

Member of the Parliament of Wallonia
- In office 11 June 2019 – 25 June 2024
- Constituency: Nivelles
- In office 13 June 2014 – 3 December 2018
- Succeeded by: Hassan Idrissi
- Constituency: Nivelles

Personal details
- Born: 16 August 1970 (age 55)
- Party: Socialist Party

Dimitri Legasse (born 16 August 1970) is a Belgian politician of the Socialist Party serving as a member of the Chamber of Representatives since 2024. He was a member of the Parliament of Wallonia from 2014 to 2018 and from 2019 to 2024.
