= Inez De Coninck =

Belgian politician

Member of the Flemish Parliament
- Incumbent
- Assumed office 2019

Mayor of Opwijk
- Incumbent
- Assumed office 2021

Personal details
- Born: 1977 (age 48–49)
- Party: N-VA

Inez De Coninck (born 10 August 1977) is a Belgian politician from Flemish Brabant region and a member of the New Flemish Alliance (N-VA).

De Coninck worked as an architect and a spatial planner. She was a co-founder of the Flemish Women's Association and became involved with the local N-VA branch in her hometown of Opwijk. She was elected to the municipal in the town in 2012. In 2019, she was elected to the Flemish Parliament and became mayor of Opwijk in 2021.
