= Joris De Vriendt =

Flemish politician

Member of the Chamber of Representatives
- Incumbent
- Assumed office 4 February 2023

Personal details
- Born: Joris De Vriendt; 10 March 1966 (age 59); Sint-Niklaas, Belgium
- Political party: Vlaams Belang

Joris De Vriendt (born Sint-Niklaas, 10 March 1966) is a Belgian businessman and politician of the Vlaams Belang party who has been a member of the Chamber of Representatives since 2023.

De Vriendt obtained a master's degree in business and consular sciences at the Antwerp Commercial College (a branch of KU Leuven) and from 1996 to 2004 he was the manager of a green roof company. From 2004 he was an advisor to the Vlaams Belang concerning socio-economic, agriculture and environmental policies before moving to Germany to work as a technical advisor for an energy business.

From 2010 to 2020 he was a municipal councilor for Vlaams Belang in Scherpenheuvel-Zichem. In 2023 he was appointed to replace Dries Van Langenhove in the Belgian Federal Parliament after he resigned his seat. Van Lagenhove was elected as an independent candidate but sat with the Vlaams Belang parliamentary group and accordingly De Vriendt took over the seat as his substitute.
