= Hassan Idrissi =

Belgian politician (1976–2023)

Member of the Parliament of Wallonia
- In office 10 December 2018 – 25 May 2019
- Preceded by: Dimitri Legasse

Member of the Parliament of the French Community
- In office 10 December 2018 – 25 May 2019
- Preceded by: Dimitri Legasse

Personal details
- Born: 15 July 1976 Tubize, Belgium
- Died: 7 May 2023 (aged 46)
- Party: PS

Hassan Idrissi (15 July 1976 – 7 May 2023) was a Belgian politician. A member of the Socialist Party, he concurrently served in the Parliament of Wallonia and the Parliament of the French Community from 2018 to 2019.

Idrissi died by suicide on 7 May 2023, at the age of 46.
