= Jan Spooren =

Belgian politician

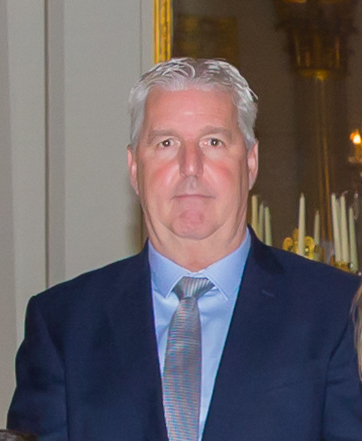
Jan Spooren in 2022

Jan Spooren (born 12 January 1969) is a Belgian politician active for the New Flemish Alliance (N-VA) and the current governor of Flemish Brabant.

Spooren obtained a law degree from KU Leuven and became active in the former Volksunie party for which he was elected as a municipal councilor in 1995. He became chairman of the local N-VA branch in Tervuren and after the municipal elections of October 2018, became mayor of Tervuren. He has served as an MP in the Chamber of Representatives since the 2014 Belgian federal elections and was re-elected in 2019.
