= Irina De Knop =

Belgian politician (born 1978)

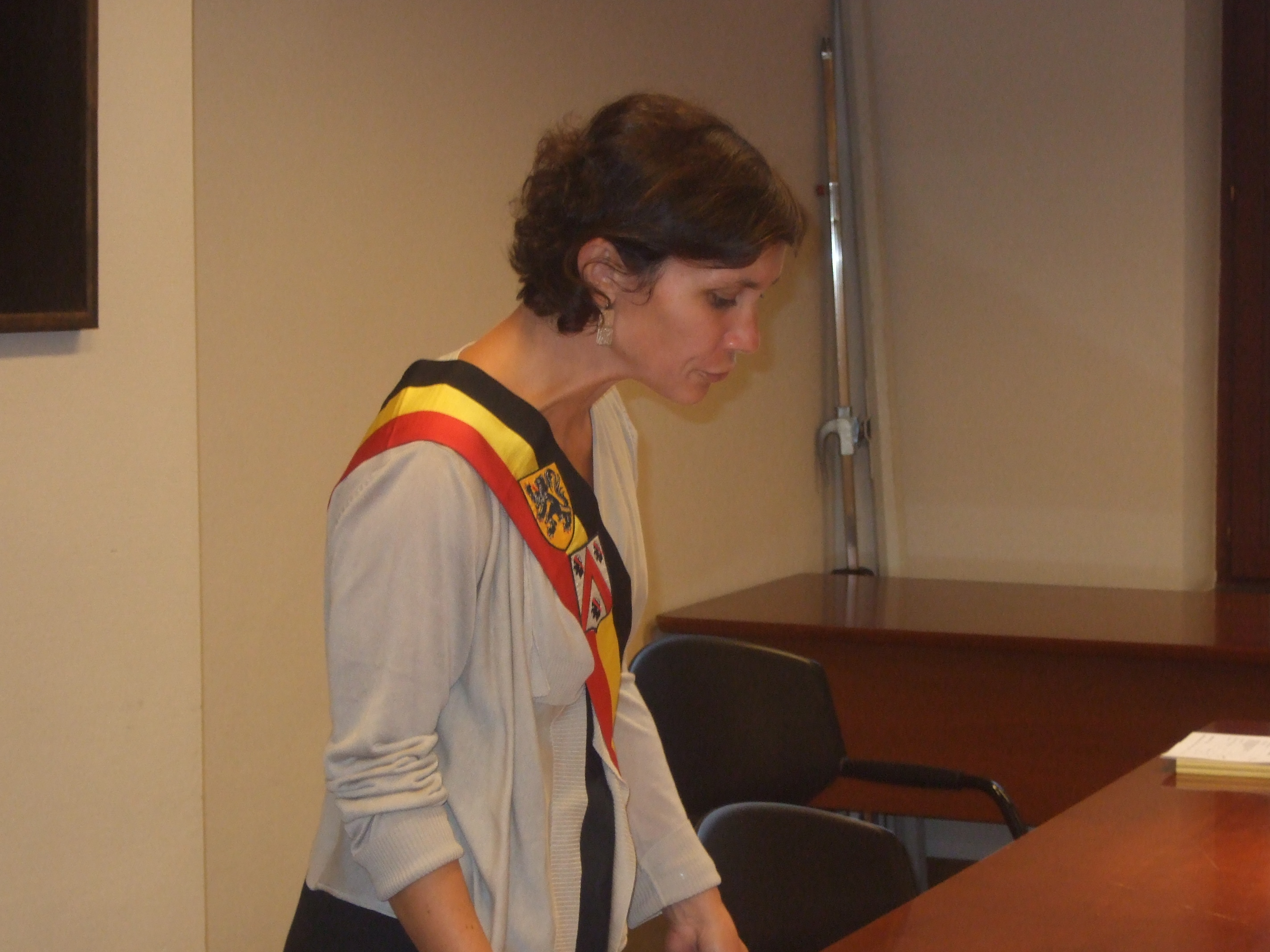

Member of the Chamber of Representatives
- Incumbent
- Assumed office 10 July 2024
- Constituency: Flemish Brabant

Personal details
- Born: 5 July 1978 (age 47)
- Party: Open Flemish Liberals and Democrats

Irina De Knop (born 5 July 1978) is a Belgian politician serving as a member of the Chamber of Representatives since 2024. She has served as mayor of Lennik since 2011.
