= List of members of the Flemish Parliament, 2009–2014 =

Flemish Parliament, 2009–2014

Overview
- Legislative body: Flemish Parliament
- Meeting place: Brussels
- Term: June 2009 – April 2014
- Election: 7 June 2009
- Government: Peeters II Government
- Members: 124
- Speaker: Jan Peumans (N-VA)

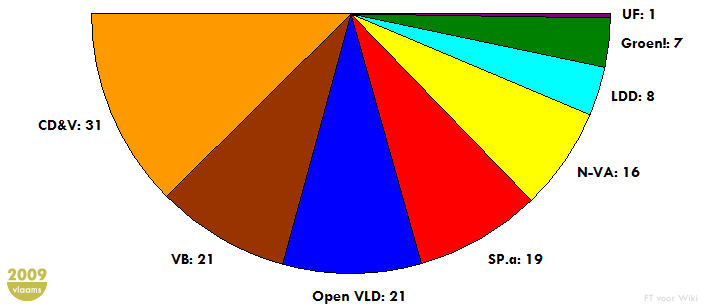
The seat division of the Parliament after the elections of 2009

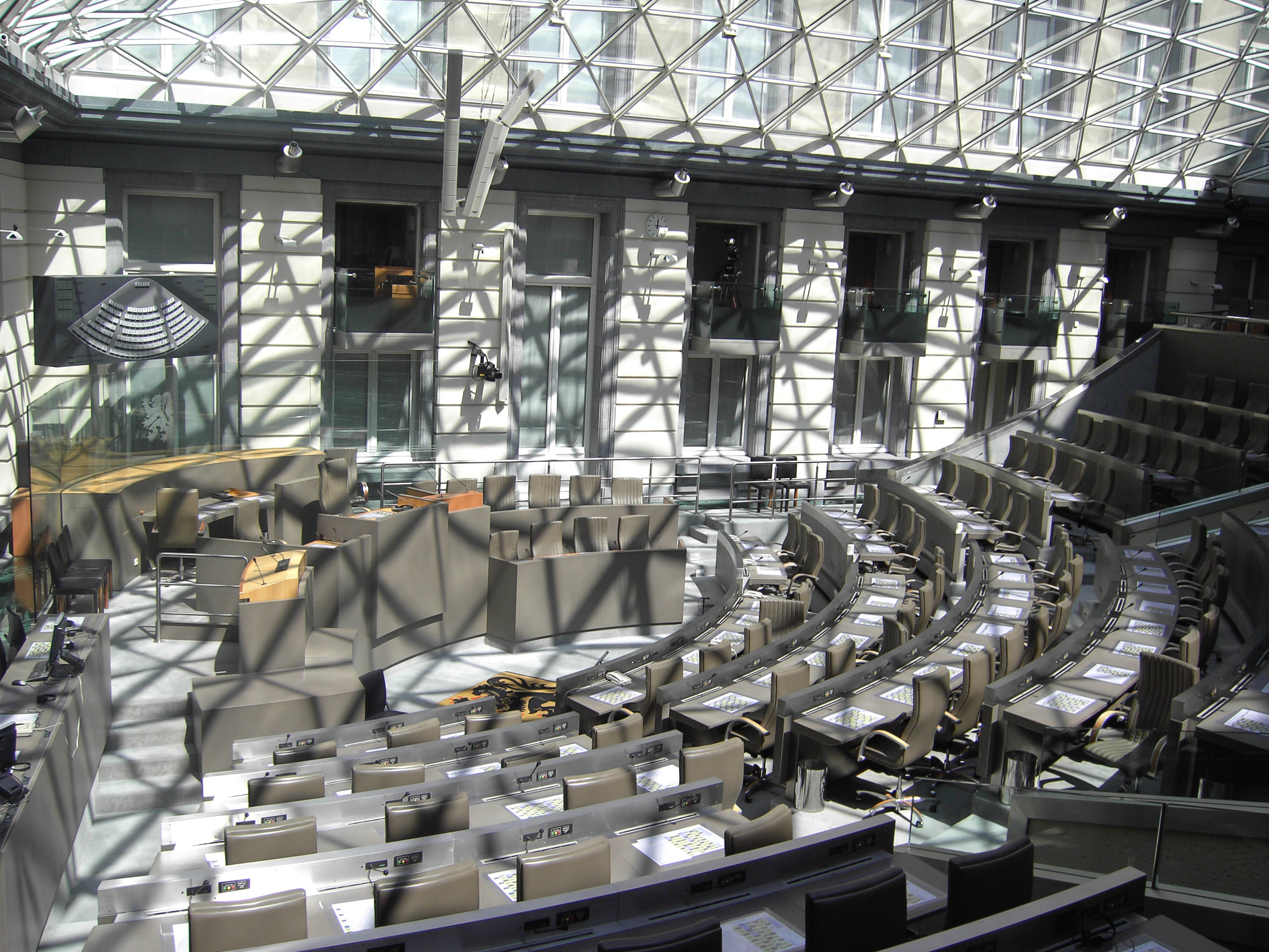
The Parliament building in Brussels

This is a list of members of the Flemish Parliament in its 12th legislative term, arranged alphabetically. The legislative term started in 2009 (after the Belgian regional elections of 2009) and lasted until 2014. However, it is only the fourth legislature since the members of the Flemish Parliament were first elected.

== Results ==
Party	Votes	%	Seats			
Party	Votes	%	Flanders	Brussels	Total	+/-
Christian Democratic and Flemish	939,873	22.86	31	1	31	-4
Flemish Interest	628,564	15.28	20	1	21	-11
Socialist Party Differently	627,852	15.27	18	1	19	-6
Open Flemish Liberals and Democrats	616,610	14.99	19	2	21	-4
New Flemish Alliance	537,040	13.06	16	–	16	+16
List Dedecker	313,176	7.62	8	–	8	+8
Groen!	278,211	6.77	6	1	7	+1
Union of Francophones	47,319	1.15	1	–	1	–
Social Liberal Party	44,734	1.09	–	–	–	–
Workers' Party of Belgium+	42,849	1.04	–	–	–	–
Left Socialist Party	10,038	0.24	–	–	–	–
Belgische Alliantie	9,318	0.23	–	–	–	–
Vrijheid	6,228	0.15	–	–	–	–
RESPECT	5,692	0.14	–	–	–	–
Committee for Another Policy	2,211	0.05	–	–	–	–
Vrije Christen Democraten	1,898	0.05	–	–	–	–
Belgische Unie – Union Belge	712	0.02	–	–	–	–
Total	4,112,325	100.00	119	6	124	0
Valid votes	4,112,325	94.50				
Invalid/blank votes	239,482	5.50				
Total votes	4,351,807	100.00				
Registered voters/turnout	4,676,488	93.06				
Source: Belgian Elections

== Leadership ==
=== Bureau ===
This is a list of the current members of the Bureau of the Flemish Parliament.

==== Speakers ====
Office	Senator	Party
Speaker	Jan Peumans	N-VA
1st Deputy Speaker	Veerle Heeren	CD&V
2nd Deputy Speaker	Marijke Dillen	Vlaams Belang
3rd Deputy Speaker	Dirk Van Mechelen	Open VLD
4th Deputy Speaker	Mia De Vits	SP.A
5th Deputy Speaker	Jos De Meyer	CD&V
6th Deputy Speaker	Filip Dewinter	Vlaams Belang

==== Secretaries ====
Senator	Party
Eric Van Rompuy	CD&V
Marino Keulen	Open VLD
Bart Martens	SP.A

=== Floor leaders ===
This is a list of the current floor leaders of the recognised fractions. They form the Extended Bureau together with the members of the Bureau.

Floor leader	Party
Koen Van den Heuvel	CD&V
Joris Van Hauthem	Vlaams Belang
Sas van Rouveroij	Open VLD
Matthias Diependaele (2009-2012: Kris Van Dijck)	N-VA
Bart Van Malderen	SP.A
Lode Vereeck	Lijst Dedecker
Elisabeth Meuleman	Groen

== List of current representatives ==
Name	Fraction	Constituency
Filip Anthuenis (resigned)	Open VLD	East Flanders
Erik Arckens‡	Independent	Brussels-Capital Region
Robrecht Bothuyne	CD&V	East Flanders
Boudewijn Bouckaert	Lijst Dedecker	East Flanders
Karin Brouwers	CD&V	Flemish Brabant
Ann Brusseel	Open VLD	Brussels-Capital Region
Agnes Bruyninckx-Vandenhoudt	Vlaams Belang	West Flanders
Karlos Callens	Open VLD	West Flanders
Ludwig Caluwé (resigned)	CD&V	Antwerp
Bart Caron	Groen	West Flanders
Vera Celis	N-VA	Antwerp
Patricia Ceysens	Open VLD	Flemish Brabant
Lode Ceyssens	CD&V	Limburg
Sonja Claes	CD&V	Limburg
Griet Coppé	CD&V	West Flanders
Frank Creyelman	Vlaams Belang	Antwerp
John Crombez (resigned)	SP.A	West Flanders
Steve D'Hulster	SP.A	Antwerp
Carl Decaluwe (resigned)	CD&V	West Flanders
Johan Deckmyn	Vlaams Belang	East Flanders
Kathleen Deckx	SP.A	Antwerp
Philippe De Coene	SP.A	West Flanders
Jean-Jacques De Gucht	Open VLD	East Flanders
Tom Dehaene (resigned)	CD&V	Flemish Brabant
Lieven Dehandschutter (resigned)	N-VA	East Flanders
Irina De Knop	Open VLD	Flemish Brabant
Dirk de Kort	CD&V	Antwerp
Kurt De Loor	SP.A	East Flanders
Paul Delva	CD&V	Brussels-Capital Region
Mark Demesmaeker (resigned)	N-VA	Flemish Brabant
Marnic De Meulemeester	Open VLD	East Flanders
Jos De Meyer	CD&V	East Flanders
Annick De Ridder	Open VLD	Antwerp
Mia De Vits	SP.A	Flemish Brabant
Gwenny De Vroe	Open VLD	Flemish Brabant
Else De Wachter	SP.A	Flemish Brabant
Patricia De Waele	Lijst Dedecker	East Flanders
Bart De Wever	N-VA	Antwerp
Filip Dewinter	Vlaams Belang	Antwerp
Matthias Diependaele	N-VA	East Flanders
Marijke Dillen	Vlaams Belang	Antwerp
Jan Durnez	CD&V	West Flanders
Tine Eerlingen	N-VA	Flemish Brabant
Martine Fournier	CD&V	West Flanders
Cindy Franssen	CD&V	East Flanders
Sven Gatz (resigned)	Open VLD	Brussels-Capital Region
Danielle Godderis-T'Jonck	N-VA	West Flanders
Peter Gysbrechts	Open VLD	Antwerp
Veerle Heeren	CD&V	Limburg
Kathleen Helsen	CD&V	Antwerp
Marc Hendrickx	N-VA	Antwerp
Liesbeth Homans	N-VA	Antwerp
Michèle Hostekint	SP.A	West Flanders
Pieter Huybrechts	Vlaams Belang	Antwerp
Yamila Idrissi	SP.A	Brussels-Capital Region
Lies Jans	N-VA	Limburg
Vera Jans	CD&V	Limburg
Chris Janssens	Vlaams Belang	Limburg
Patrick Janssens	SP.A	Antwerp
Ward Kennes	CD&V	Antwerp
Marino Keulen	Open VLD	Limburg
Jan Laurys	CD&V	Flemish Brabant
Marcel Logist	SP.A	Flemish Brabant
Chokri Mahassine	SP.A	Limburg
Bart Martens	SP.A	Antwerp
Katleen Martens	Vlaams Belang	Limburg
Elisabeth Meuleman	Groen	East Flanders
An Michiels (resigned)	Vlaams Belang	Flemish Brabant
Fientje Moerman	Open VLD	East Flanders
Dirk Peeters	Groen	Antwerp
Lydia Peeters	Open VLD	Limburg
Fatma Pehlivan	SP.A	East Flanders
Jan Penris	Vlaams Belang	Antwerp
Jan Peumans	N-VA	Limburg
Sabine Poleyn	CD&V	West Flanders
Peter Reekmans	Lijst Dedecker	Flemish Brabant
Els Robeyns	SP.A	Limburg
Jan Roegiers	SP.A	East Flanders
Tinne Rombouts	CD&V	Antwerp
Ivan Sabbe	Lijst Dedecker	West Flanders
Hermes Sanctorum	Groen	Flemish Brabant
Ludo Sannen (resigned)	SP.A	Limburg
Johan Sauwens	CD&V	Limburg
Katrien Schryvers	CD&V	Antwerp
Herman Schueremans (resigned)	Open VLD	Flemish Brabant
Willy Segers	N-VA	Flemish Brabant
Stefaan Sintobin	Vlaams Belang	West Flanders
Griet Smaers	CD&V	Antwerp
Helga Stevens	N-VA	East Flanders
Felix Strackx	Vlaams Belang	Flemish Brabant
Erik Tack	Vlaams Belang	East Flanders
Valerie Taeldeman	CD&V	East Flanders
Bart Tommelein	Open VLD	West Flanders
Güler Turan	SP.A	Antwerp
Wilfried Vandaele	N-VA	West Flanders
Marc Vanden Bussche	Open VLD	West Flanders
Marleen Van den Eynde	Vlaams Belang	Antwerp
Koen Van den Heuvel	CD&V	Antwerp
Vera Van der Borght	Open VLD	East Flanders
Marleen Vanderpoorten	Open VLD	Antwerp
Luckas Van Der Taelen	Groen	Brussels-Capital Region
Marc Van de Vijver	CD&V	East Flanders
Kris Van Dijck	N-VA	Antwerp
Christian Van Eyken	UF	Flemish Brabant
Joris Van Hauthem	Vlaams Belang	Flemish Brabant
Bart Van Malderen	SP.A	East Flanders
Dirk Van Mechelen	Open VLD	Antwerp
Karim Van Overmeire†	N-VA	East Flanders
Eric Van Rompuy	CD&V	Flemish Brabant
Sas van Rouveroij	Open VLD	East Flanders
Gerda Van Steenberge‡	Independent	East Flanders
Mercedes Van Volcem	Open VLD	West Flanders
Lode Vereeck	Lijst Dedecker	Limburg
Jan Verfaillie	CD&V	West Flanders
Goedele Vermeiren	N-VA	Antwerp
Christian Verougstraete	Vlaams Belang	West Flanders
Johan Verstreken	CD&V	West Flanders
Jurgen Verstrepen	Lijst Dedecker	Antwerp
Linda Vissers	Vlaams Belang	Limburg
Mieke Vogels	Groen	Antwerp
Filip Watteeuw (resigned)	Groen	East Flanders
Ulla Werbrouck	Lijst Dedecker	West Flanders
Wim Wienen	Vlaams Belang	Antwerp
Veli Yüksel	CD&V	East Flanders

† Elected as member of Vlaams Belang; joined the New Flemish Alliance (N-VA) on 31 August 2011.
‡ Elected as members of Vlaams Belang; became independent representatives on 20 July 2011 (Ackers) and 12 July 2012 (Van Steenberge).

== Changes during the legislature ==
=== Representatives who chose not to sit ===
Name	Fraction	Constituency	Date of resignation	Replacement	Notes
Gerolf Annemans	Vlaams Belang	Antwerp	30 June 2009	Jan Penris	Stays federal representative
Jean-Marie Dedecker	Lijst Dedecker	West Flanders	30 June 2009	Ivan Sabbe	Stays federal representative
Johan Demol	Vlaams Belang	Brussels-Capital Region	30 June 2009	Erik Arckens	Stays Brussels representative
Guy D'Haeseleer	Vlaams Belang	East Flanders	30 June 2009	Erik Tack	Stays federal representative
Annick Ponthier	Vlaams Belang	Limburg	30 June 2009	Katleen Martens	Stays federal representative
Bart Somers	Open VLD	Antwerp	30 June 2009	Annick De Ridder	Stays federal representative
Dirk Sterckx	Open VLD	Antwerp	30 June 2009	Peter Gysbrechts	Becomes member of the European Parliament
Daniël Termont	SP.A	East Flanders	30 June 2009	Bart Van Malderen	Stays mayor of Ghent
Erika Thijs	CD&V	Limburg	30 June 2009	Lode Ceyssens	Stays federal senator
Bruno Valkeniers	Vlaams Belang	Antwerp	30 June 2009	Marleen Van den Eynde	Stays federal representative
Kathleen Van Brempt	SP.A	Antwerp	30 June 2009	Bart Martens	Becomes member of the European Parliament
Anke Van dermeersch	Vlaams Belang	East Flanders	30 June 2009	Wim Wienen	Stays federal senator
Frank Van Hecke	Vlaams Belang	Antwerp	30 June 2009	Stefaan Sintobin	Becomes member of the European Parliament
Brigitte Grouwels	CD&V	Brussels-Capital Region	13 July 2009	Paul Delva	Stays Brussels representative
Yves Leterme	CD&V	West Flanders	13 July 2009	Jan Durnez	Stays federal senator

=== Representatives who resigned ===
Name	Fraction	Constituency	Date of resignation	Replacement	Notes
Geert Bourgeois	N-VA	West Flanders	13 July 2009	Wilfried Vandaele	Became minister in Peeters II
Hilde Crevits	CD&V	West Flanders	13 July 2009	Sabine Poleyn	Became minister in Peeters II
Kris Peeters	CD&V	Antwerp	13 July 2009	Koen Van den Heuvel	Became minister-president in Peeters II
Joke Schauvliege	CD&V	East Flanders	13 July 2009	Valerie Taeldeman	Became minister in Peeters II
Freya Van den Bossche	SP.A	East Flanders	13 July 2009	Jan Roegiers	Became minister in Peeters II
Jo Vandeurzen	CD&V	Limburg	13 July 2009	Vera Jans	Became minister in Peeters II
Sophie De Wit	N-VA	Antwerp	6 July 2010	Goedele Vermeiren	Became federal representative
Caroline Gennez	SP.A	Antwerp	6 July 2010	Steve D'Hulster	Became federal representative
Frank Vandenbroucke	SP.A	Flemish Brabant	6 July 2010	Else De Wachter	Became federal representative
Peter Vanvelthoven	SP.A	Limburg	6 July 2010	Ludo Sannen	Became federal representative
An Michiels	VB	Flemish Brabant	10 October 2010	Wim Van Dijck	Ended her political career for personal reasons
Sven Gatz	Open VLD	Brussels-Capital Region	30 June 2011	Khadija Zamouri	Ended his political career for professional reasons
John Crombez	SP.A	West Flanders	6 December 2011	Jurgen Vanlerberghe	Became secretary of state in Di Rupo I
Carl Caluwe	CD&V	West Flanders	31 January 2012	Els Kindt	Became governor of West Flanders
Ludwig Caluwé	CD&V	Antwerp	1 December 2012	Caroline Bastiaens	Became provincial deputy in 2013
Tom Dehaene	CD&V	Flemish Brabant	13 December 2012	Peter Van Rompuy	Became provincial deputy in 2013
Lieven Dehandschutter	N-VA	East Flanders	31 December 2012	Marius Meremans	Became mayor of Sint-Niklaas
Herman Schueremans	Open VLD	Flemish Brabant	1 January 2013	Jo De Ro	Ended his political career for professional reasons
Filip Watteeuw	Groen	East Flanders	4 January 2013	Björn Rzoska	Became alderman in Ghent
Mark Demesmaeker	N-VA	Flemish Brabant	31 January 2013	Piet De Bruyn	Became member of the European Parliament
Ludo Sannen	SP.A	Limburg	16 September 2013	Joke Quintens	Ended his political career
Filip Anthuenis	Open VLD	East Flanders	23 September 2013	Egbert Lachaert	

== Sources ==
- "Vlaamse Volksvertegenwoordigers" (in Dutch). The Flemish Parliament.
- "Bureau" (in Dutch). The Flemish Parliament. Archived from the original on 2010-07-07.
