= Antwerp (Flemish Parliament constituency) =

- Flemish Parliament constituency
- Antwerp within Belgium

Current constituency
- Created: 2004
- Seats: 33

Antwerp is a parliamentary constituency in Belgium used to elect members of the Flemish Parliament since 2004. It corresponds to the province of Antwerp.

Article 26 of the Special Law on Institutional Reform of 1980 gives the Flemish Parliament itself the authority to define its electoral districts by decree. The arrondissemental constituencies were replaced by provincial ones by Special Decree of 30 January 2004. This and related provisions were coordinated into the Special Decree of 7 July 2006.

== Representatives ==
Name	Party	From	To
Anissa Temsamani	SP.A	2004	2009
Anke Van dermeersch	VB	2009	2014
Annick De Ridder	Open Vld	2004	2014
Bart De Smet	CVP	1999	2004
Bart De Wever	N-VA	2009	2014
Bart Martens	SP.A	2004	2014
Bart Somers	Open Vld	2009	2014
Caroline Bastiaens	CD&V	2009	2014
Caroline Gennez	SP.A	2009	2014
Claudine De Schepper	Open Vld	1999	2004
Dirk de Kort	CD&V	2004	2014
Dirk Peeters	Groen	2009	2014
Dirk Van Mechelen	Open Vld	2009	2014
Dirk Van Mechelen	Open Vld	1995	1999
Els Van Weert	SLP	2004	2009
Etienne de Groot	Open Vld	1995	1999
Filip Dewinter	VB	1995	2014
Frank Creyelman	VB	2004	2014
Frans Peeters	CD&V	2004	2009
Goedele Vermeiren	N-VA	2009	2014
Griet Smaers	CD&V	2009	2014
Güler Turan	SP.A	2009	2014
Hans Schoofs	Open Vld	2004	2009
Herman Lauwers	VU	1995	2004
Herman Suykerbuyk	CVP	1995	1999
Herman Wynants	N-VA	2009	2014
Hilde De Lobel	VB	1999	2009
Imade Annouri	Groen	2009	2014
Ingrid Pira	Groen	2009	2014
Jamila Hamddan Lachkar	CD&V	2009	2014
Jan Bertels	SP.A	2009	2014
Jan Penris	VB	1995	2014
Jan Van Esbroeck	N-VA	2009	2014
Jo Vermeulen	SP.A	1999	2009
Johan Malcorps	Agalev	1995	2004
Johan Van Brusselen	VB	1999	2004
Julien Van Aperen	Open Vld	1999	2009
Jurgen Verstrepen	LDD	2004	2014
Kathleen Deckx	SP.A	2009	2014
Kathleen Helsen	CD&V	2004	2014
Kathleen Krekels	N-VA	2009	2014
Kathy Lindekens	SP	1995	1999
Katrien Schryvers	CD&V	2009	2014
Koen Helsen	Open Vld	1999	2004
Koen Van den Heuvel	CD&V	2004	2014
Kris Van Dijck	N-VA	2004	2014
Liesbeth Homans	N-VA	2009	2014
Luc Van den Brande	CD&V	2004	2009
Ludo Van Campenhout	N-VA	2009	2014
Ludwig Caluwé	CD&V	1999	2009
Luk Van Nieuwenhuysen	VB	2004	2009
Manuela Van Werde	N-VA	2009	2014
Marc Hendrickx	N-VA	2009	2014
Marc van den Abeelen	Open Vld	1999	2009
Marc Van Peel	CVP	1995	1999
Margriet Hermans	Open Vld	2004	2009
Marie-Rose Morel	VB	2004	2009
Marijke Dillen	VB	1995	2014
Marleen Van den Eynde	VB	2004	2014
Marleen Van den Eynde	VB	1999	2004
Marleen Vanderpoorten	Open Vld	2004	2014
Martine Taelman	Open Vld	2009	2014
Mia De Schamphelaere	CVP	1995	1999
Mieke Vogels	Groen	2004	2014
Miel Verrijken	VB	1995	1999
Orry Van de Wauwer	CD&V	2009	2014
Patrick Janssens	SP.A	2004	2014
Paul Cordy	N-VA	2009	2014
Paul Dumez	CVP	1995	1999
Paul Van Miert	N-VA	2009	2014
Peter De Ridder	SP	1995	2004
Peter Gysbrechts	Open Vld	2009	2014
Peter Wouters	N-VA	2009	2014
Pieter Huybrechts	VB	2004	2014
Ria Van Den Heuvel	Agalev	1995	2004
Robert Voorhamme	SP.A	1995	2009
Rudi Daems	Groen	2004	2009
Sofie Joosen	N-VA	2009	2014
Steve D'Hulster	SP.A	2009	2014
Tine van der Vloet	N-VA	2009	2014
Tinne Rombouts	CD&V	2004	-
Tuur Van Wallendael	SP	1995	1999
Vera Celis	N-VA	2009	2014
Ward Beysen	Open Vld	1995	1999
Ward Kennes	CD&V	2004	2014
Willem-Frederik Schiltz	Open Vld	2009	2014
Wim Wienen	VB	2009	2014
Wivina Demeester	CVP	1999	2004
Wouter Van Besien	Groen	2009	2014
Yasmine Kherbache	SP.A	2009	2014
Yolande Avontroodt	Open Vld	1995	1999
