= List of members of the Flemish Parliament, 2014–2019 =

Flemish Parliament, 2014–19

Overview
- Legislative body: Flemish Parliament
- Meeting place: Brussels
- Term: 17 June 2014 – 2019
- Election: 25 May 2014
- Government: Bourgeois Government
- Members: 124
- Speaker: Jan Peumans (N-VA)

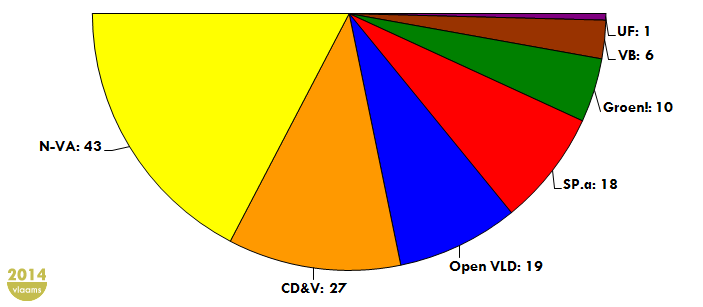
The seat division of the Parliament after the elections of 2014

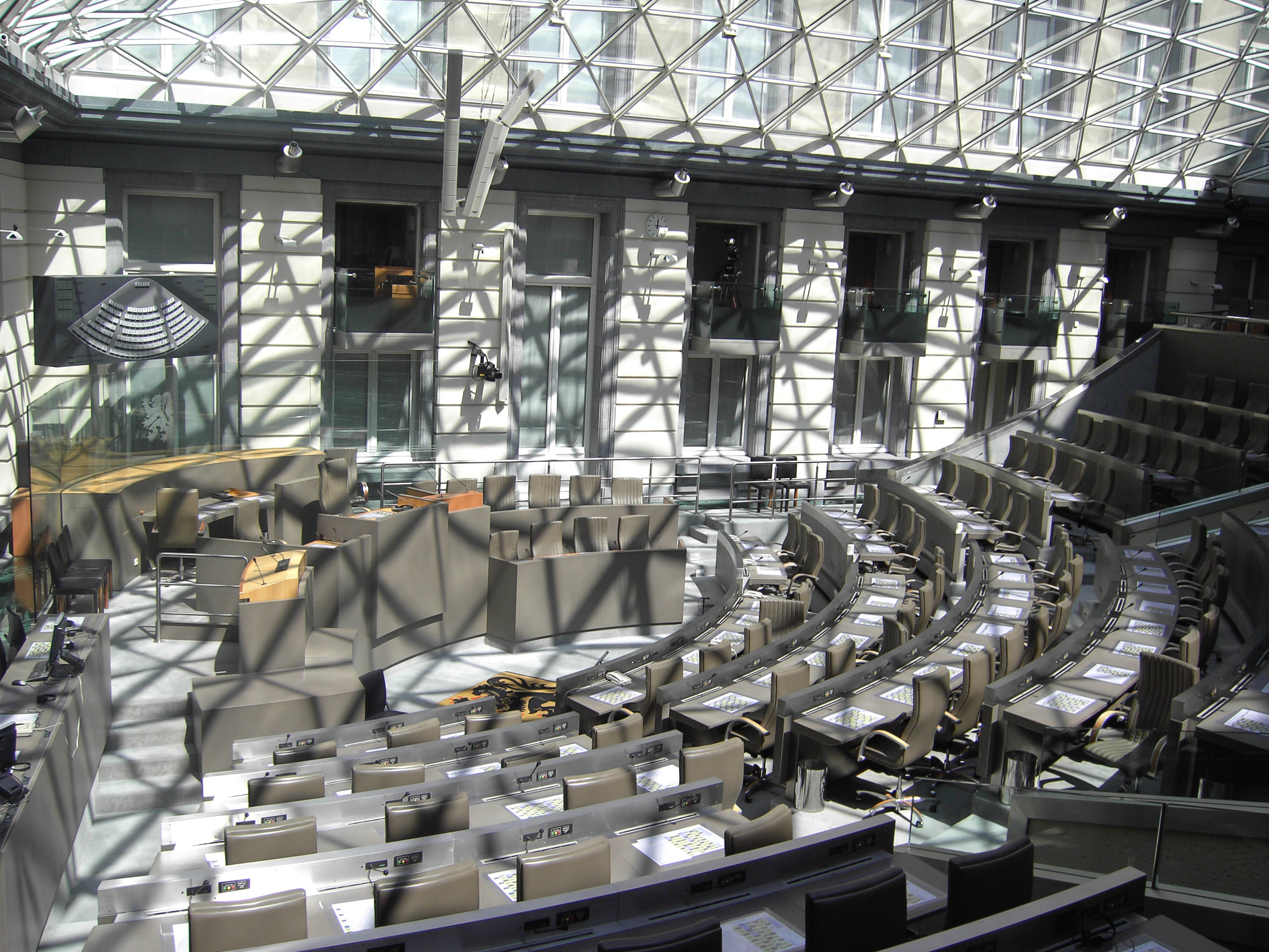
The Parliament building in Brussels

The Flemish Parliaments 12th legislature started in June 2014 (after the Belgian regional elections of 2014) and lasted until 2019. It was the fifth legislature since the members of the Flemish Parliament were first elected.

The government during this legislative term was the Bourgeois Government, which consisted of the three largest parties N-VA, CD&V and Open Vld.

== May 2014 election results ==
Party	Votes	%	Seats			
Party	Votes	%	Flanders	Brussels	Total	+/-
New Flemish Alliance	1,339,943	31.88	42	1	43	▲27
Christian Democratic and Flemish	860,685	20.48	26	1	27	▼4
Open Flemish Liberals and Democrats	594,464	14.15	17	2	19	▼2
Socialist Party Differently	587,901	13.99	17	1	18	▼1
Green	365,779	8.70	9	1	10	▲3
Flemish Interest	248,840	5.92	6	0	6	▼15
Workers' Party of Belgium+	106,114	2.53	0	0	0	Steady
Union of Francophones	34,741	0.83	1	0	1	Steady
Pirate Party	25,986	0.62	0	0	0	Steady
Gezonde Evenwichtige Nieuwe Open Eerlijke Groepering	10,612	0.25	0	0	0	Steady
ROSSEM	9,937	0.24	0	0	0	Steady
Recht Op Een Leven	5,228	0.12	0	0	0	Steady
Vlaamse Christen Partij	5,026	0.12	0	0	0	Steady
Maakbare Maatschappij	3,227	0.08	0	0	0	Steady
Sociaal Democraten & Progressieven	2,853	0.07	0	0	0	Steady
Vrijheid, Intimiteit, Thuis, Arbeid en Liefde	617	0.01	0	0	0	Steady
Pensio(e)n Plus	482	0.01	0	0	0	Steady
Total	4,202,435	100.00	118	6	124	–
Valid votes	4,202,435	95.03				
Invalid/blank votes	219,601	4.97				
Total votes	4,422,036	100.00				
Registered voters/turnout	4,779,144	92.53				
Source: Belgian Elections

== Leadership ==
=== Bureau ===
This is a list of the members of the Bureau of the Flemish Parliament during the 12th legislature.

==== Speakers ====
MP	Party	Office
Jan Peumans	N-VA	Speaker
Peter Van Rompuy	CD&V	1st Deputy Speaker
Wilfried Vandaele	N-VA	2nd Deputy Speaker
Bart Somers	Open Vld	3rd Deputy Speaker
Caroline Gennez	sp.a	4th Deputy Speaker

==== Secretaries ====
MP	Party
Nadia Sminate	N-VA
Sonja Claes	CD&V
Kris Van Dijck	N-VA

=== Floor leaders ===
This is a list of the group leaders (fractieleiders) of the recognised parliamentary groups (fracties) during the 12th legislature. They form the Extended Bureau together with the members of the Bureau.

Floor leader	Group
Matthias Diependaele	N-VA
Koen Van den Heuvel	CD&V
Bart Somers	Open Vld
Joris Vandenbroucke	sp.a
Björn Rzoska	Green
Chris Janssens	Flemish Interest

== List ==
Representative	Party	Electoral district	Notes
Vera Celis	N-VA	Antwerp	since 25 July 2014, replacing Liesbeth Homans, who became Minister in the Flemish Government
Jan Peumans	N-VA	Limburg	Speaker of the Flemish Parliament
Bert Maertens	N-VA	West Flanders	since 25 July 2014, replacing Geert Bourgeois, who became Minister in the Flemish Government
Peter Persyn	N-VA	Flemish Brabant	since 25 July 2014, replacing Ben Weyts, who became Minister in the Flemish Government
Matthias Diependaele	N-VA	East Flanders	
Karl Vanlouwe	N-VA	Brussels-Capital Region	
Ann Soete	N-VA	West Flanders	left party August 2017
Lies Jans	N-VA	Limburg	
Caroline Croo	N-VA	East Flanders	since 11 October 2014, replacing Elke Sleurs, who became Secretary of State in the Federal Government
Nadia Sminate	N-VA	Flemish Brabant	
Kris Van Dijck	N-VA	Antwerp	
Andries Gryffroy	N-VA	East Flanders	
Piet De Bruyn	N-VA	Flemish Brabant	
Grete Remen	N-VA	Limburg	
Annick De Ridder	N-VA	Antwerp	
Wilfried Vandaele	N-VA	West Flanders	
Lorin Parys	N-VA	Flemish Brabant	
Axel Ronse	N-VA	West Flanders	
Marc Hendrickx	N-VA	Antwerp	
Marius Meremans	N-VA	East Flanders	
Jos Lantmeeters	N-VA	Limburg	
Jelle Engelbosch	N-VA	Limburg	
Lieve Maes	N-VA	Flemish Brabant	
Cathy Coudyser	N-VA	West Flanders	
Paul Van Miert	N-VA	Antwerp	
Karim Van Overmeire	N-VA	East Flanders	
Björn Anseeuw	N-VA	West Flanders	
Bart Nevens	N-VA	Flemish Brabant	
Ingeborg De Meulemeester	N-VA	East Flanders	
Manuela Van Werde	N-VA	Antwerp	
Danielle Godderis-T'Jonck	N-VA	West Flanders	
Sabine Vermeulen	N-VA	East Flanders	
Willy Segers	N-VA	Flemish Brabant	
Herman Wynants	N-VA	Antwerp	
Miranda Van Eetvelde	N-VA	East Flanders	
Kathleen Krekels	N-VA	Antwerp	
Koen Daniëls	N-VA	East Flanders	replaces Lieven Dehandschutter, who decided not to combine his function as Mayor of Sint-Niklaas with this function
Jan Hofkens	N-VA	Antwerp	since 25 July 2014, replacing Philippe Muyters, who became Minister in the Flemish Government
Peter Wouters	N-VA	Antwerp	
Ludo Van Campenhout	N-VA	Antwerp	
Sofie Joosen	N-VA	Antwerp	
Jan Van Esbroeck	N-VA	Antwerp	
Tine Van der Vloet	N-VA	Antwerp	
An Christiaens	CD&V	Limburg	since 25 July 2014, replacing Jo Vandeurzen, who became Minister in the Flemish Government
Jan Durnez	CD&V	West Flanders	since 25 July 2014, replacing Hilde Crevits, who became Minister in the Flemish Government
Peter Van Rompuy	CD&V	Flemish Brabant	
Jenne De Potter	CD&V	East Flanders	since 25 July 2014, replacing Joke Schauvliege, who became Minister in the Flemish Government
Katrien Schryvers	CD&V	Antwerp	since 11 October 2014, replacing Kris Peeters, who became Minister in the Federal Government
Joris Poschet	CD&V	Brussels-Capital Region	since 22 July 2014, replacing Bianca Debaets, who became Secretary of State in the Brussels Government
Bart Dochy	CD&V	West Flanders	
Jos De Meyer	CD&V	East Flanders	
Lode Ceyssens	CD&V	Limburg	
Karin Brouwers	CD&V	Flemish Brabant	
Tinne Rombouts	CD&V	Antwerp	
Sonja Claes	CD&V	Limburg	
Michel Doomst	CD&V	Flemish Brabant	
Martine Fournier	CD&V	West Flanders	
Koen Van den Heuvel	CD&V	Antwerp	
Cindy Franssen	CD&V	East Flanders	
Katrien Partyka	CD&V	Flemish Brabant	
Johan Verstreken	CD&V	West Flanders	
Vera Jans	CD&V	Limburg	
Kathleen Helsen	CD&V	Antwerp	
Robrecht Bothuyne	CD&V	East Flanders	
Valerie Taeldeman	CD&V	East Flanders	
Griet Coppé	CD&V	West Flanders	
Orry Van de Wauwer	CD&V	Antwerp	since 5 July 2017, replacing Caroline Bastiaens
Ward Kennes	CD&V	Antwerp	
Sabine De Bethune	CD&V	West Flanders	
Dirk de Kort	CD&V	Antwerp	
Emmily Talpe	Open Vld	West Flanders	since 11 October 2014, replacing Bart Tommelein, who became Secretary of State in the Federal Government
Ann Brusseel	Open Vld	Brussels-Capital Region	
Bart Somers	Open Vld	Antwerp	
Marino Keulen	Open Vld	Limburg	
Mathias De Clercq	Open Vld	East Flanders	
Gwendolyn Rutten	Open Vld	Flemish Brabant	
Lionel Bajart	Open Vld	Brussels-Capital Region	
Lydia Peeters	Open Vld	Limburg	
Martine Taelman	Open Vld	Antwerp	
Mercedes Van Volcem	Open Vld	West Flanders	
Rik Daems	Open Vld	Flemish Brabant	
Freya Saeys	Open Vld	East Flanders	
Jean-Jacques De Gucht	Open Vld	East Flanders	
Willem-Frederik Schiltz	Open Vld	Antwerp	
Jo De Ro	Open Vld	Flemish Brabant	
Francesco Vanderjeugd	Open Vld	West Flanders	
Marnic De Meulemeester	Open Vld	East Flanders	
Gwenny De Vroe	Open Vld	Flemish Brabant	
Herman De Croo	Open Vld	East Flanders	
John Crombez	sp.a	West Flanders	
Yamila Idrissi	sp.a	Brussels-Capital Region	
Bruno Tobback	sp.a	Flemish Brabant	
Freya Van den Bossche	sp.a	East Flanders	
Caroline Gennez	sp.a	Antwerp	
Bert Moyaers	sp.a	Limburg	since 2 March 2016, replacing Ingrid Lieten, who left politics
Kurt De Loor	sp.a	East Flanders	
Rob Beenders	sp.a	Limburg	
Jan Bertels	sp.a	Antwerp	
Michèle Hostekint	sp.a	West FLanders	
Katia Segers	sp.a	Flemish Brabant	
Bart Van Malderen	sp.a	East Flanders	
Renaat Landuyt	sp.a	West FLanders	
Els Robeyns	sp.a	Limburg	
Yasmine Kherbache	sp.a	Antwerp	
Tine Soens	sp.a	West FLanders	
Güler Turan	sp.a	Antwerp	
Joris Vandenbroucke	sp.a	East Flanders	replaces Daniël Termont, who decided not to combine his function as Mayor of Ghent with this function
Imade Annouri	Groen	Antwerp	
Bart Caron	Groen	West Flanders	
Johan Danen	Groen	Limburg	
Elisabeth Meuleman	Groen	East Flanders	
An Moerenhout	Groen	Flemish Brabant	
Ingrid Pira	Groen	Antwerp	
Björn Rzoska	Groen	East Flanders	
Hermes Sanctorum	Groen	Flemish Brabant	quit the party in September 2016
Wouter Van Besien	Groen	Antwerp	
Elke Van den Brandt	Groen	Brussels Capital Region	
Ortwin Depoortere	Vlaams Belang	East Flanders	since 28 September 2015, replacing Barbara Bonte, who resigned for personal reasons
Guy D'Haeseleer	Vlaams Belang	East Flanders	
Chris Janssens	Vlaams Belang	Limburg	
Stefaan Sintobin	Vlaams Belang	West Flanders	
Anke Van dermeersch	Vlaams Belang	Antwerp	
Tom Van Grieken	Vlaams Belang	Antwerp	
Christian Van Eyken	UF	Flemish Brabant	

== Sources ==
- "Vlaamse Volksvertegenwoordigers" (in Dutch). The Flemish Parliament.
- "Bureau" (in Dutch). The Flemish Parliament. Archived from the original on 2010-07-07.
