= West Flanders (Flemish Parliament constituency) =

- Flemish Parliament constituency
- West Flanders within Belgium

Current constituency
- Created: 2004
- Seats: 22

West Flanders is a parliamentary constituency in Belgium used to elect members of the Flemish Parliament since 2004. It corresponds to the province of West Flanders.

Article 26 of the Special Law on Institutional Reform of 1980 gives the Flemish Parliament itself the authority to define its electoral districts by decree. The arrondissemental constituencies were replaced by provincial ones by Special Decree of 30 January 2004. This and related provisions were coordinated into the Special Decree of 7 July 2006.

== Representatives ==
| Name | Party | From | To |
|---|---|---|---|
| Agnes Bruyninckx-Vandenhoudt | VB | 2004 | 2014 |
| André Van Nieuwkerke | SP.A | 2004 | 2009 |
| Ann Soete | N-VA | 2009 | 2014 |
| Axel Ronse | N-VA | 2009 | 2014 |
| Bart Caron | SLP | 2004 | 2014 |
| Bart Dochy | CD&V | 2009 | 2014 |
| Bart Tommelein | Open Vld | 2009 | 2014 |
| Bert Maertens | N-VA | 2009 | 2014 |
| Björn Anseeuw | N-VA | 2009 | 2014 |
| Carl Decaluwe | CD&V | 2004 | 2009 |
| Cathy Coudyser | N-VA | 2009 | 2014 |
| Christian Verougstraete | VB | 2004 | 2014 |
| Danielle Godderis-T'Jonck | N-VA | 2009 | 2014 |
| Els Kindt | CD&V | 2009 | 2014 |
| Emmily Talpe | Open Vld | 2009 | 2014 |
| Francesco Vanderjeugd | Open Vld | 2009 | 2014 |
| Geert Bourgeois | N-VA | 2004 | 2009 |
| Gilbert Bossuyt | SP.A | 2004 | 2009 |
| Gino De Craemer | N-VA | 2004 | 2009 |
| Griet Coppé | CD&V | 2009 | 2014 |
| Herman De Reuse | VB | 2004 | 2009 |
| Ivan Sabbe | LDD | 2009 | 2014 |
| Jan Durnez | CD&V | 2009 | 2014 |
| Jan Verfaillie | CD&V | 2004 | 2014 |
| Jef Tavernier | Groen | 2004 | 2009 |
| Johan Verstreken | CD&V | 2004 | 2014 |
| Jurgen Vanlerberghe | SP.A | 2009 | 2014 |
| Karlos Callens | Open Vld | 2004 | 2014 |
| Louis Bril | Open Vld | 2004 | 2009 |
| Luc Martens | CD&V | 2004 | 2009 |
| Marc Vanden Bussche | LDD | 2009 | 2014 |
| Martine Fournier | CD&V | 2004 | 2009 |
| Martine Fournier | CD&V | 2009 | 2014 |
| Mercedes Van Volcem | Open Vld | 2009 | 2014 |
| Michèle Hostekint | SP.A | 2004 | 2014 |
| Patrick De Klerck | Open Vld | 2004 | 2009 |
| Philippe De Coene | SP.A | 2004 | 2014 |
| Renaat Landuyt | SP.A | 2009 | 2014 |
| Sabine De Bethune | CD&V | 2009 | 2014 |
| Sabine Poleyn | CD&V | 2004 | 2014 |
| Stefaan Sintobin | VB | 2004 | 2014 |
| Stern Demeulenaere | Open Vld | 2004 | 2009 |
| Steve Vandenberghe | SP.A | 2009 | 2014 |
| Tine Soens | SP.A | 2009 | 2014 |
| Ulla Werbrouck | LDD | 2009 | 2014 |
| Wilfried Vandaele | N-VA | 2009 | 2014 |
