= Ramskapelle =

Ramskapelle may refer to:

- Ramskapelle, Knokke-Heist, a village in Knokke-Heist, Belgium
- Ramskapelle, Nieuwpoort, a village in Nieuwpoort, Belgium
