= Verougstraete =

Verougstraete is a surname. Notable people with the surname include:

- Christian Verougstraete (born 1950, Belgian politician
- Norbert Verougstraete (1934–2016), Belgian cyclist
