= Van Rompuy (surname) =

Van Rompuy is a Flemish family name derived from [van] ruim pad which means "[of/from] wide path". It may refer to:

People

- Eric Van Rompuy (born 1949), Flemish politician
- Herman Van Rompuy (born 1947), Belgian Prime minister, President of the Council of the European Union
- Peter Van Rompuy (born 1980), Belgian senator

Politics

- Van Rompuy Government, federal government of Belgium formed on December 30, 2008
