= Veurne-Diksmuide-Ostend-Ypres (Flemish Parliament constituency) =

Veurne-Diksmuide-Ostend-Ypres was a constituency used to elect members of the Flemish Parliament between 1995 and 2003.

== Representatives ==
Election	MFP (Party)	MFP (Party)	MFP (Party)	MFP (Party)	MFP (Party)	MFP (Party)	MFP (Party)	MFP (Party)
1995	Christian Verougstraete (VB)	Julien Demeulenaere (VLD)	Didier Ramoudt (VLD)	Gilbert Vanleenhove (CVP)	Jacky Maes (PS)	Maria Tyberghien-Vandenbussche (CVP)	Paul Deprez (CVP)	Johnny Goos (PS)
1999	Christian Verougstraete (VB)	Julien Demeulenaere (VLD)	Didier Ramoudt (VLD)	Gilbert Vanleenhove (CVP)	Jacky Maes (PS)	Jan Verfaillie (CVP)	Didier Ramoudt (VLD)	Jan Loons (VU)
