= Dirk De Vriese =

Belgian footballer

Personal information
- Date of birth: 3 December 1958 (age 67)
- Place of birth: Knokke-Heist, Belgium

International career
| Years | Team | Apps | (Gls) |
| 1984 | Belgium | 1 | (0) |

Dirk De Vriese (born 3 December 1958) is a Belgian footballer. He played in one match for the Belgium national football team in 1984.
