= Belgian government formation =

Belgian government formation may refer to:

- 2007–2008 Belgian government formation
- 2010–2011 Belgian government formation
- 2014 Belgian government formation
- 2019–2020 Belgian government formation
- 2024 Belgian government formation
