= Knokke-Heist =

Knokke-Heist: Knocke-Heist (French)
- Municipality
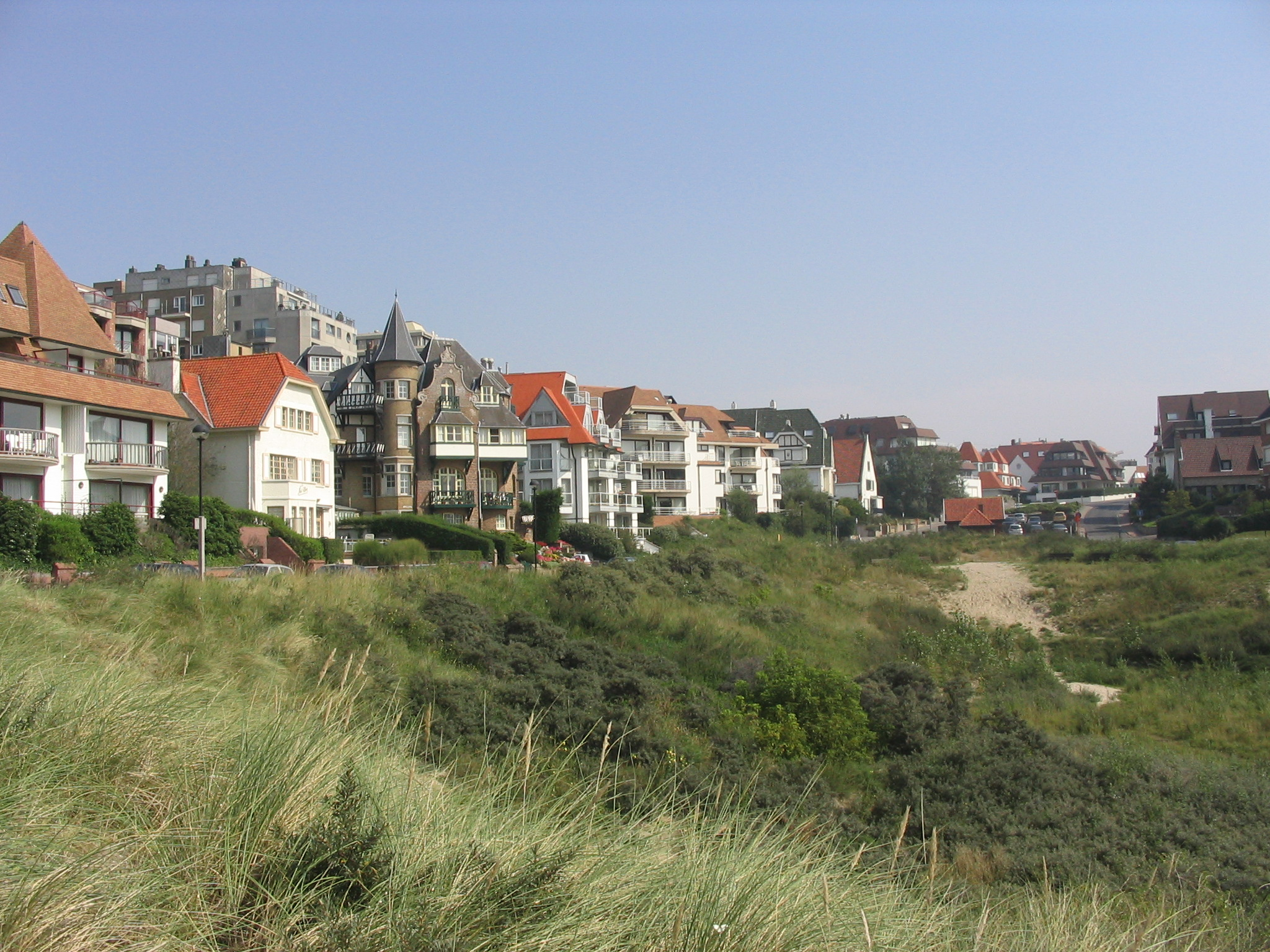

- Flag Coat of arms

- Location of Knokke-Heist in West Flanders
- Interactive map of Knokke-Heist
- Location in Belgium
- Coordinates: 51°20′N 03°17′E
- Country: Belgium
- Community: Flemish Community
- Region: Flemish Region
- Province: West Flanders
- Arrondissement: Bruges

Government
  - Mayor: Cathy Coudyser
  - Governing party: Inzicht-Ja!

Area
  - Total: 61.59 km^{2} (23.78 sq mi)

Population (2018-01-01)
  - Total: 33,097
  - Density: 537.4/km^{2} (1,392/sq mi)
- Postal codes: 8300, 8301
- NIS code: 31043
- Area codes: 050
- Website: www.knokke-heist.be

Knokke-Heist (Dutch pronunciation: [ˌknɔkəˈɦɛist]; French: Knocke-Heist) is a municipality in the Belgian province of West Flanders. The municipality comprises the towns of Heist-aan-Zee, Knokke, Duinbergen, Ramskapelle and Westkapelle. On January 1, 2006, Knokke-Heist had a total population of 34,063. The total area is 56.44 km^{2} which gives a population density of 603 inhabitants per km^{2}. Knokke-Heist is located along the North Sea in a polder area on the Belgian border with the Netherlands. It is Belgium's best-known and most affluent seaside resort.

== History ==
=== Middle Ages ===
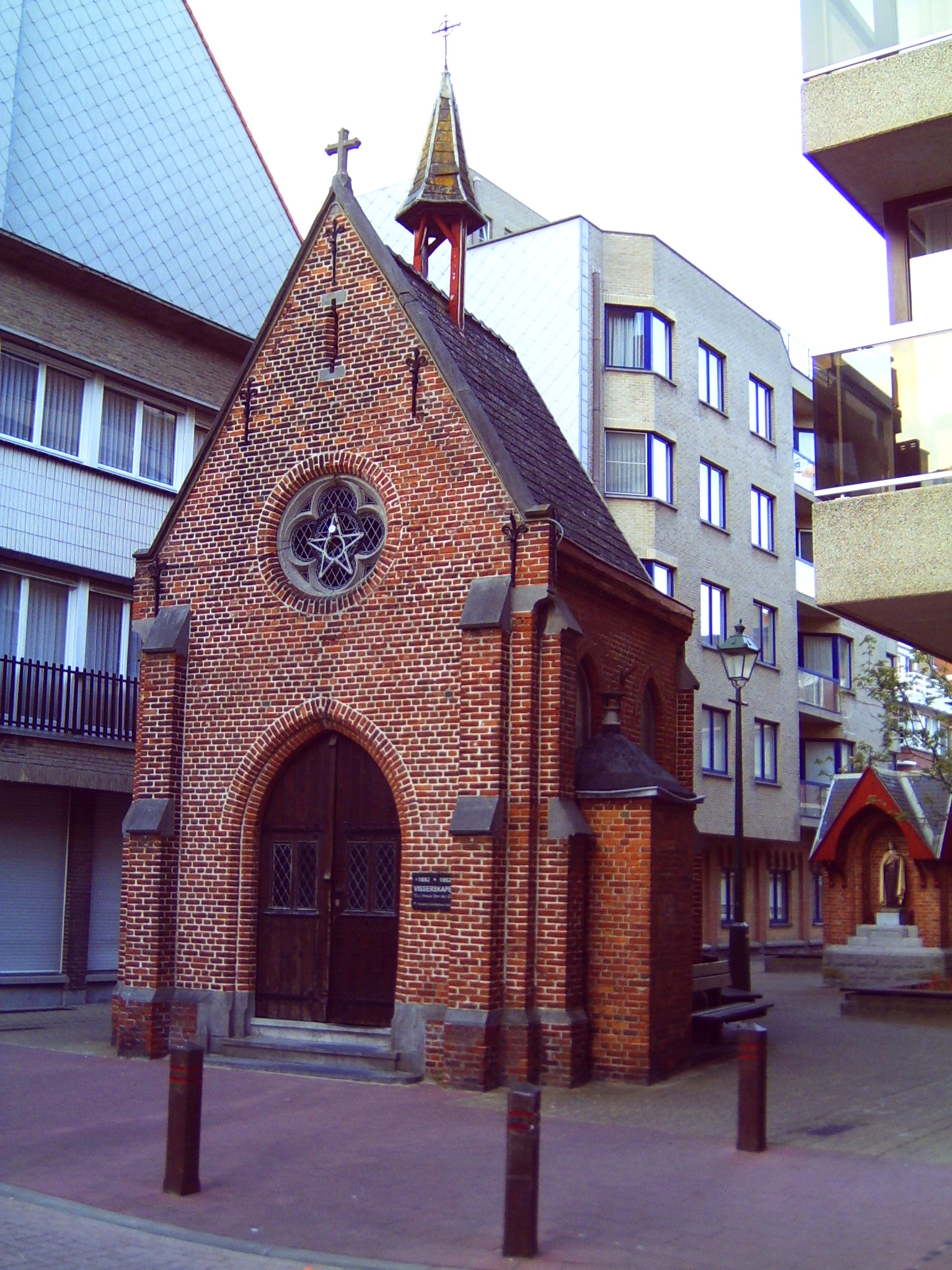
Chapel of the fishermen in Heist

Originally, the marshy Zwin area was mostly settled by shepherds and fishermen. With the encouragement of the Counts of Flanders, several dykes were built between the 11th and the 13th century and the land successfully dewatered, giving rise to agriculture and further sheep breeding. New parishes were founded and the early settlement of Sint-Anna-ter-Muiden, later made part of Westkapelle, obtained city rights in 1242.

The strategic importance of the Zwin harbour was recognized in 1301, during the war between Count Guy of Dampierre and the French King Philip the Fair. During the Hundred Years' War that followed shortly after, several battles were fought between France and England for supremacy of the area including the Battle of Sluys in June 1340. The local population tried to remain neutral as it was politically tied to Flanders, then allied to France, but economically dependent on wool from England. Under Philip the Bold’s leadership, it took advantage of the relative peace of the end of the century to fortify the canal linking the Zwin to the port of Bruges.

=== 15th to 17th century ===
The beginning of the 15th century witnessed several renewed English attacks on neighboring Sluis, with devastating effects on the local economy, until a lasting peace was signed in 1439. The end of the century was marked by internal rebellions against Maximilian of Austria and strategic flooding of the polders. The reign of Charles V in the following century saw peace coming back to the region. This was also the time when the Zwin started silting and when apple orchards were planted to supplement the local economy.

The Wars of Religion of the late 16th century brought renewed floods and devastation, but the economy managed to come back to life after the Peace of Westphalia with the cultivation of rapeseed and potatoes. The strength of this agricultural rebirth and of the cattle trade allowed the local farmers to weather future economic crises relatively well.

=== 18th century until today ===
Following the Treaty of Utrecht in 1713, the territory of Knokke was annexed to the Netherlands, but the old border was reestablished at the Zwin a few years later. After the Battle of Fleurus (1794), Bruges, Knokke and the neighboring municipalities were included in the department of the Lys. The construction of the Leopold Canal in 1857 made the closing of the Zwin and its transformation in a natural reservation possible. The development of Knokke and Heist as tourist destinations followed soon after. The population of Knokke doubled between 1873 and 1914 to 3,326 inhabitants, then again from 1914 to 1930 and again to reach more than 14,000 in 1965 despite the heavy setbacks brought by World War II.

== Notable sights ==
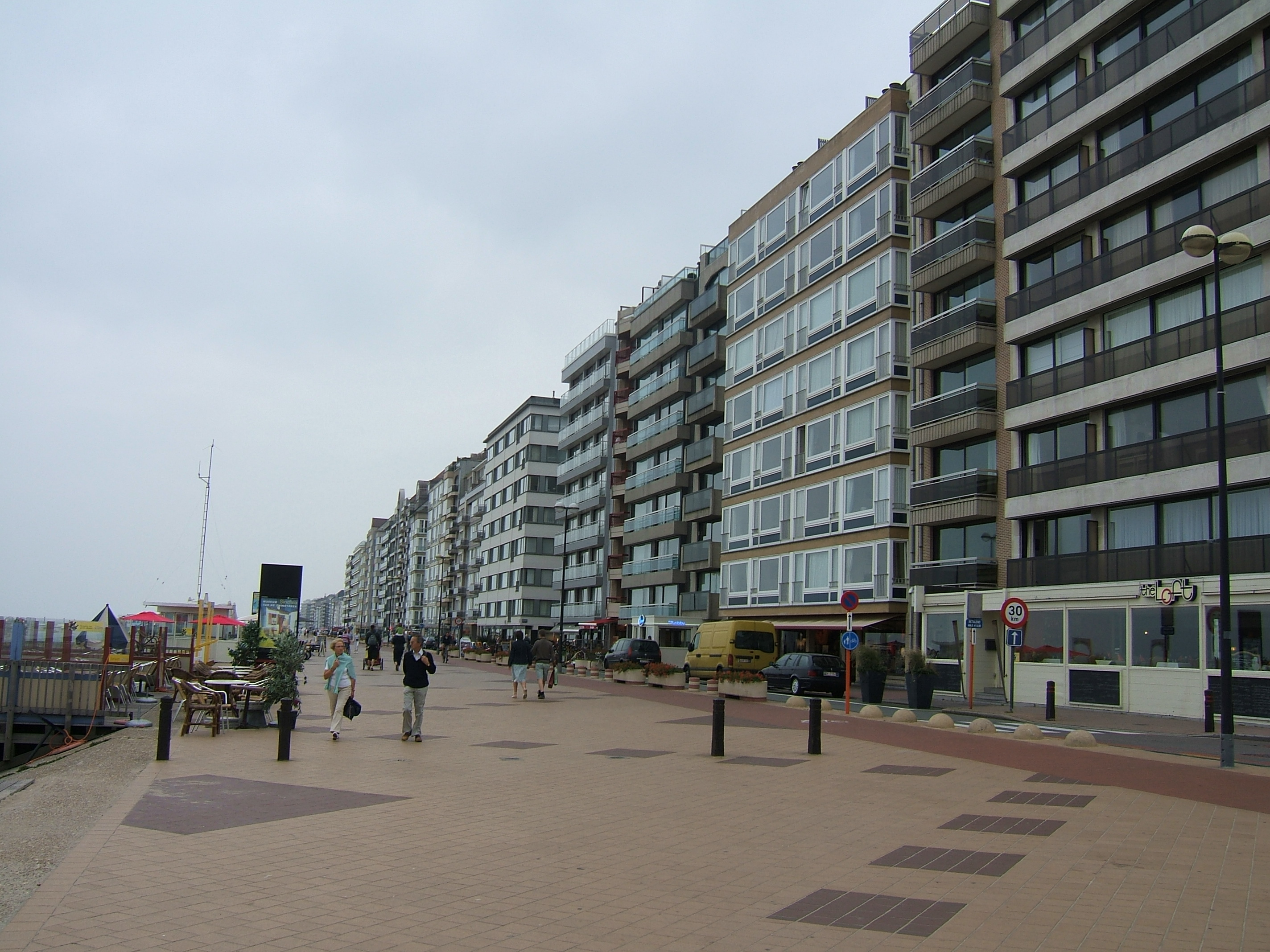
Beach promenade in Knokke-Heist

- The area known as Het Zoute (Le Zoute in French) includes the exclusive Royal Zoute Golf Club, located in the dunes.
- The Zwin, a 158 ha coastal nature reserve. This large salt-water marsh area is also a protected bird sanctuary.
- The Sincfala museum, located in Heist, documents the regional history and way of life.
- A butterfly garden (Vlindertuin) was established near Moeder Siska, the coffeehouse that makes clover-shaped waffles which dates from 1892. Both closed in 2010.
- Scharpoord, a concert hall
- "De groetende mannen", translated to "the men greeting (each other)", a sculpture by Joep van Lieshout of two large orange men shaking hands
- The sculpture of Alfred Verwee located in front of the town hall
- The sculpture located on the beach of Knokke-Heist. There are many sculptures in Knokke-Heist located on the beach and on the wave breakers.
- The pink fountain located at the tourism center.
- The sculpture of a blue floating water faucet built by the municipal water company.
- The sculpture of a rabbit located at the end of the boardwalk.

== Events, sports and culture ==
- Knokke-Heist is home to more than 40 art galleries.
- The Kneistival, a free and week-long music festival, has taken place every July since 1986.
- Festival international du cinéma expérimental de Knokke-le-Zoute (Experimental Film festival)
- Knokke-Heist is home to the Cartoon Festival of Knokke-Heist, which is an art gallery open in the summer located on the beach in front of the casino in which cartoons for adults and children are presented.
- Knokke-Heist host a carnaval every year at the end of February.
- The Belgian Basketball Supercup is held in Knokke-Heist.
- The Belgian Volleyball Supercup is also held in Knokke-Heist.
- Miss Belgian beauty is Belgian beauty pageant held in Knokke-Heist.
- The Zwin Triathlon at the end of September.

== Notable people ==
- Camille Bulcke (1909–1982), Belgian Jesuit missionary
- Axelle Dauwens (born 1990), Belgian athlete
- Maxim De Cuyper (born 2000), Belgian footballer
- Benny De Schrooder (born 1980), Belgian cyclist
- Dirk De Vriese (born 1958), Belgian footballer
- Emmerik De Vriese (born 1985), Belgian footballer
- Nicky Degrendele (born 1996), Belgian cyclist
- Frieda Deschacht (born 1968), Belgian politician
- Gilles Dewaele (born 1996), Belgian footballer
- Marnix Lameire (born 1955), Belgian cyclist
- Maurice Lippens (born 1943), Belgian businessman
- Benjamin Pauwels (born 2004), Belgian footballer
- Elliot Pinhey (1910–1999), British entomologist
- Günther Vanaudenaerde (born 1984), Belgian footballer

== Gallery ==
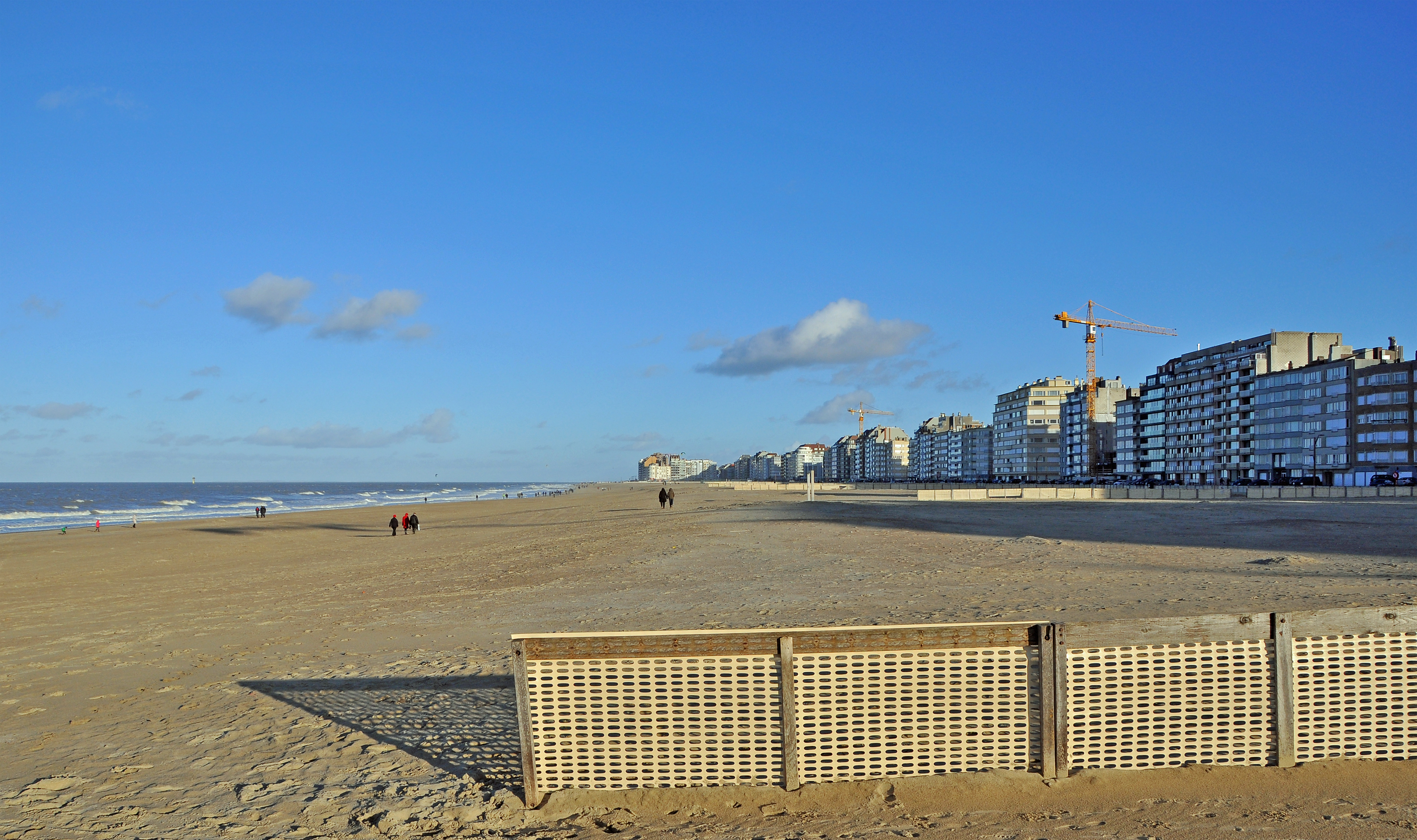
Beach

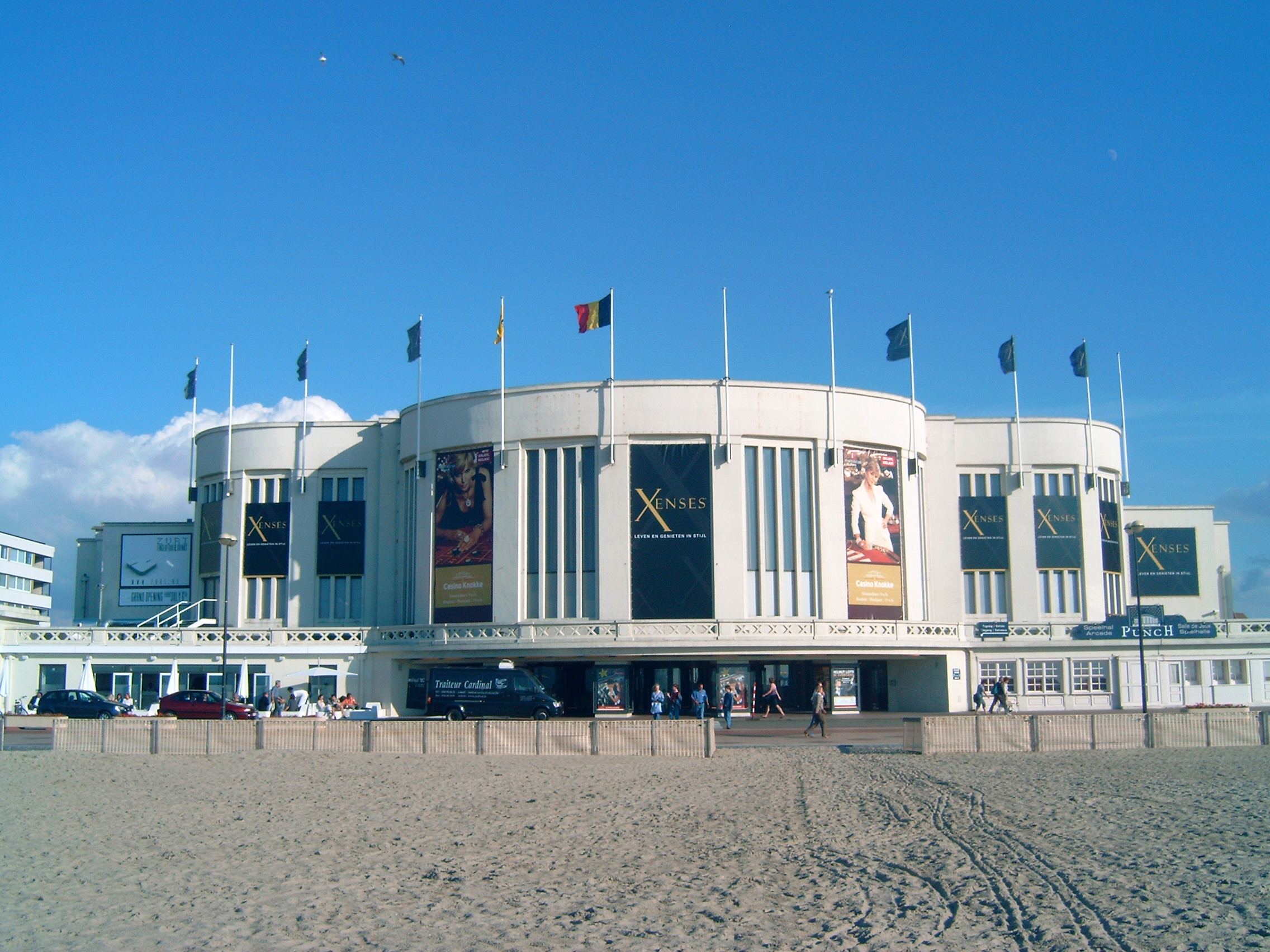
Casino

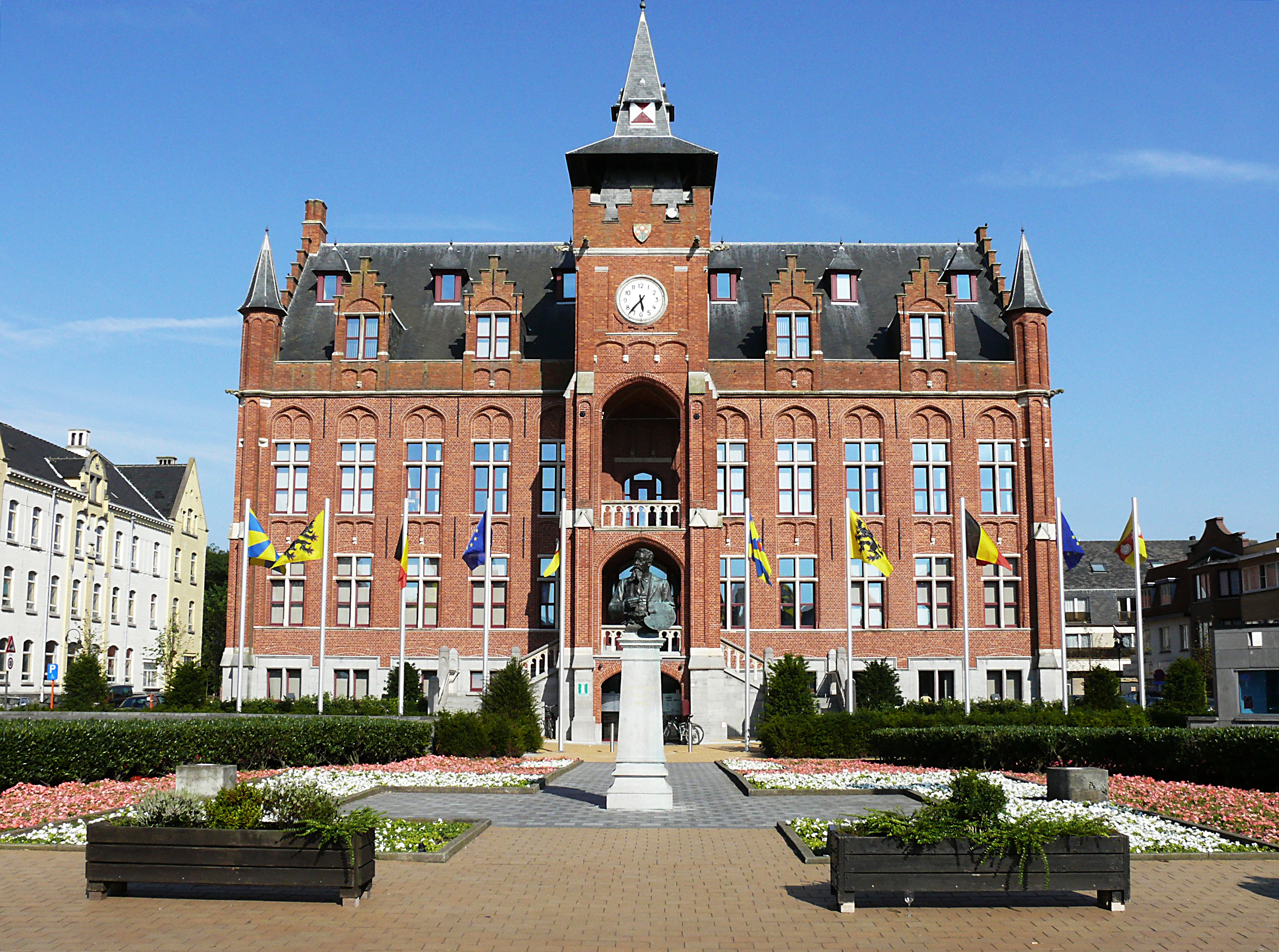
Townhall

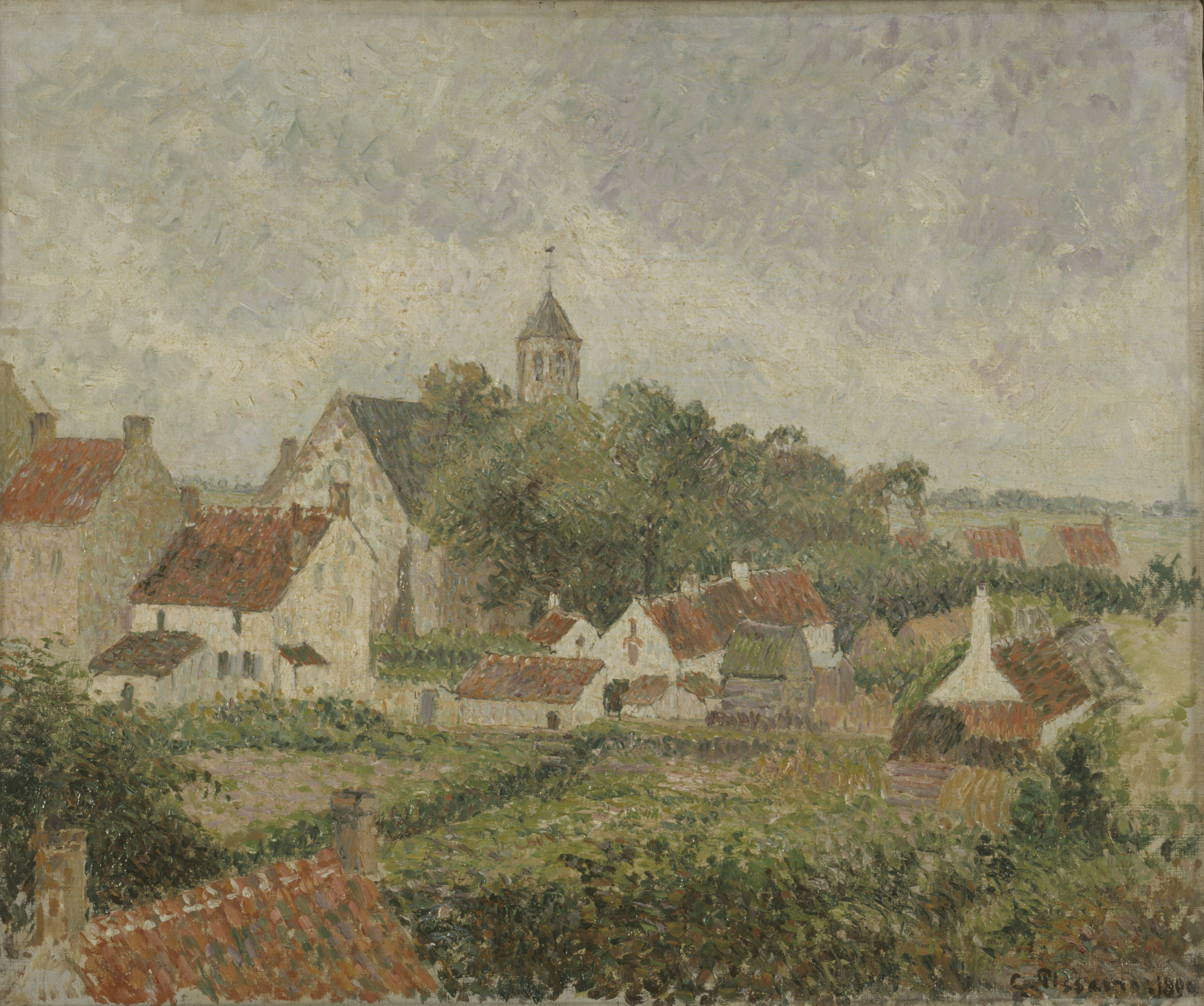
Painting of one time village

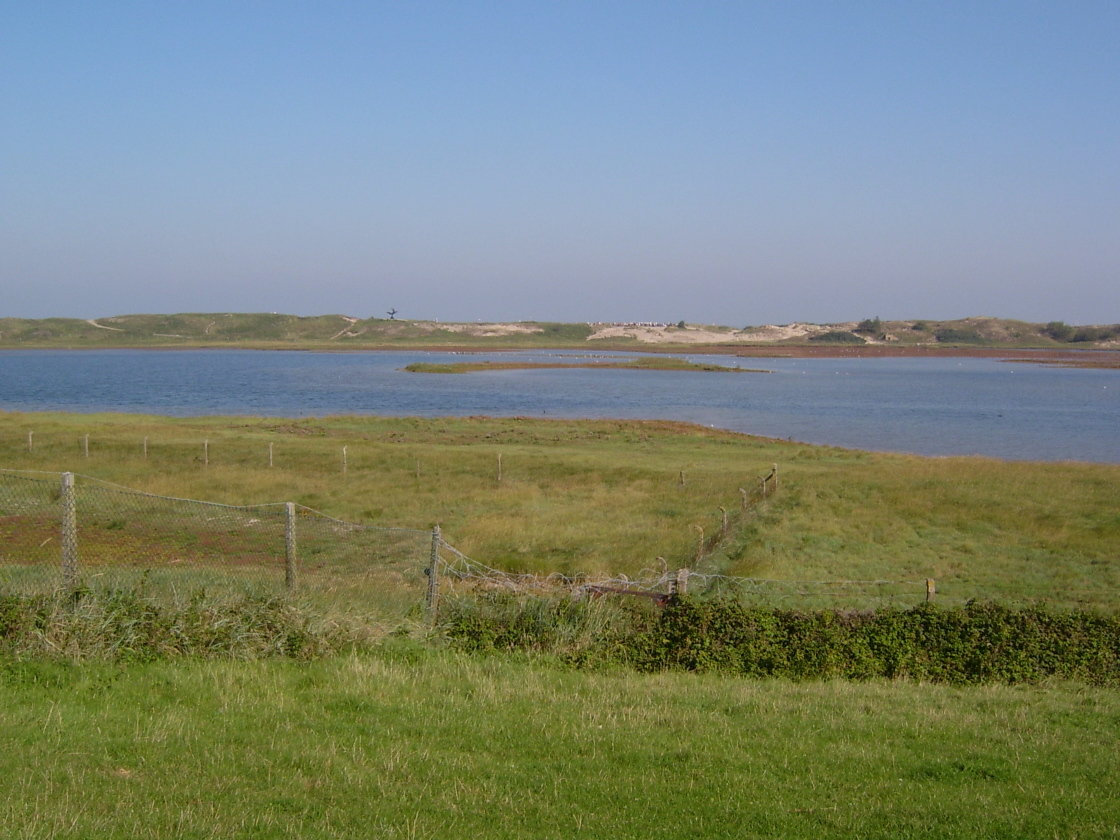
The Zwin nature reserve

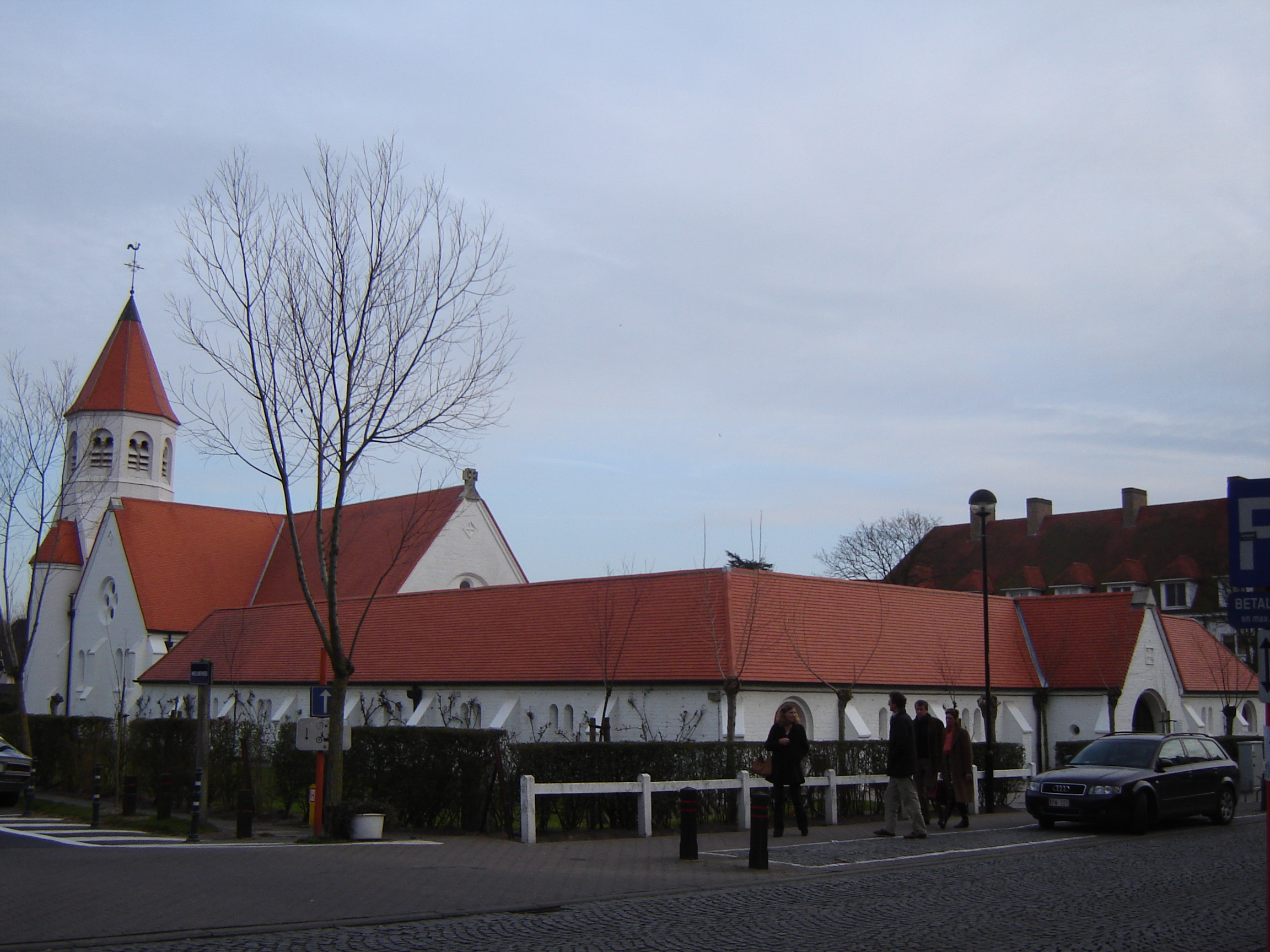
Dominican church

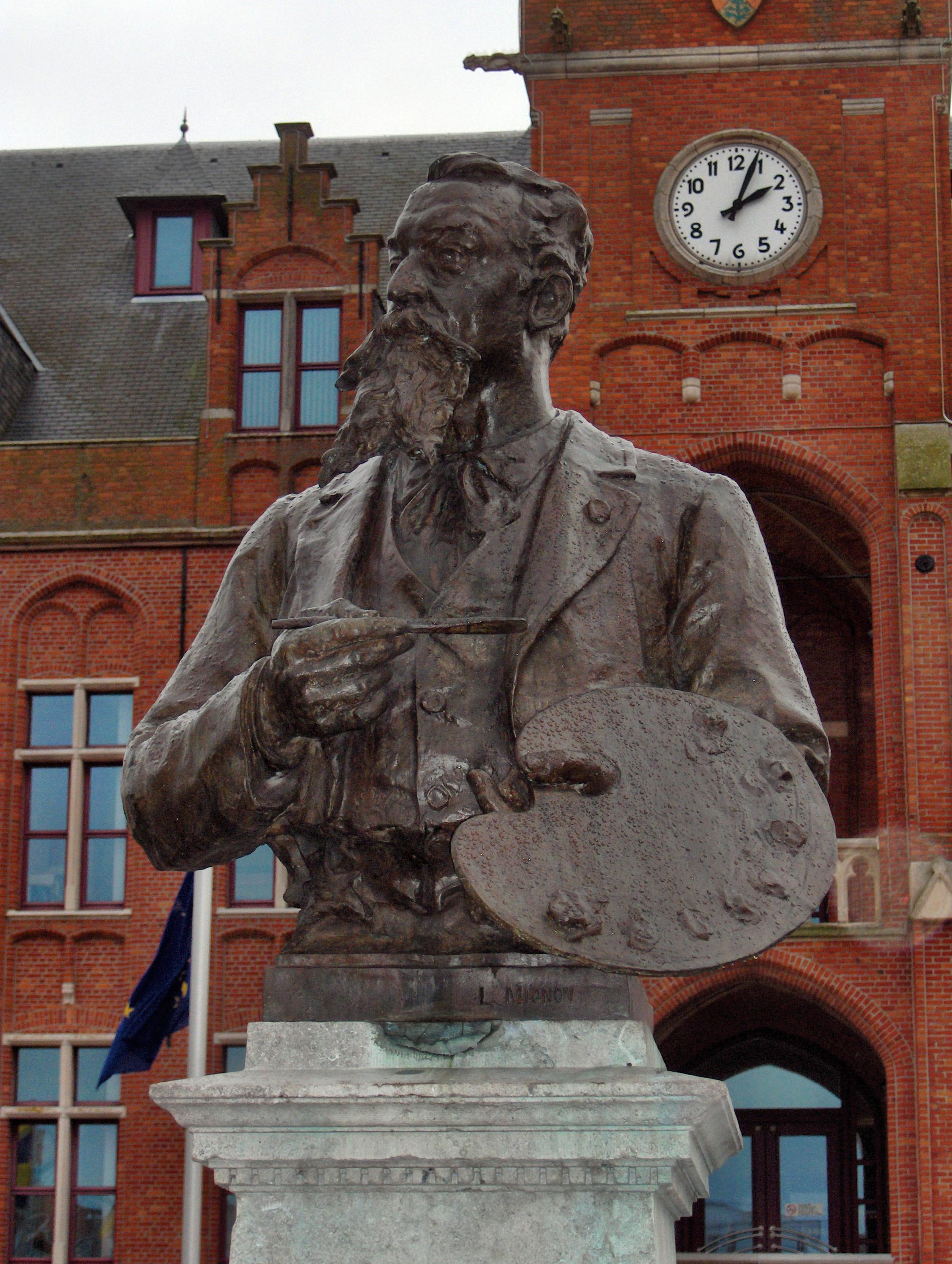
Sculpture of Alfred Verwee

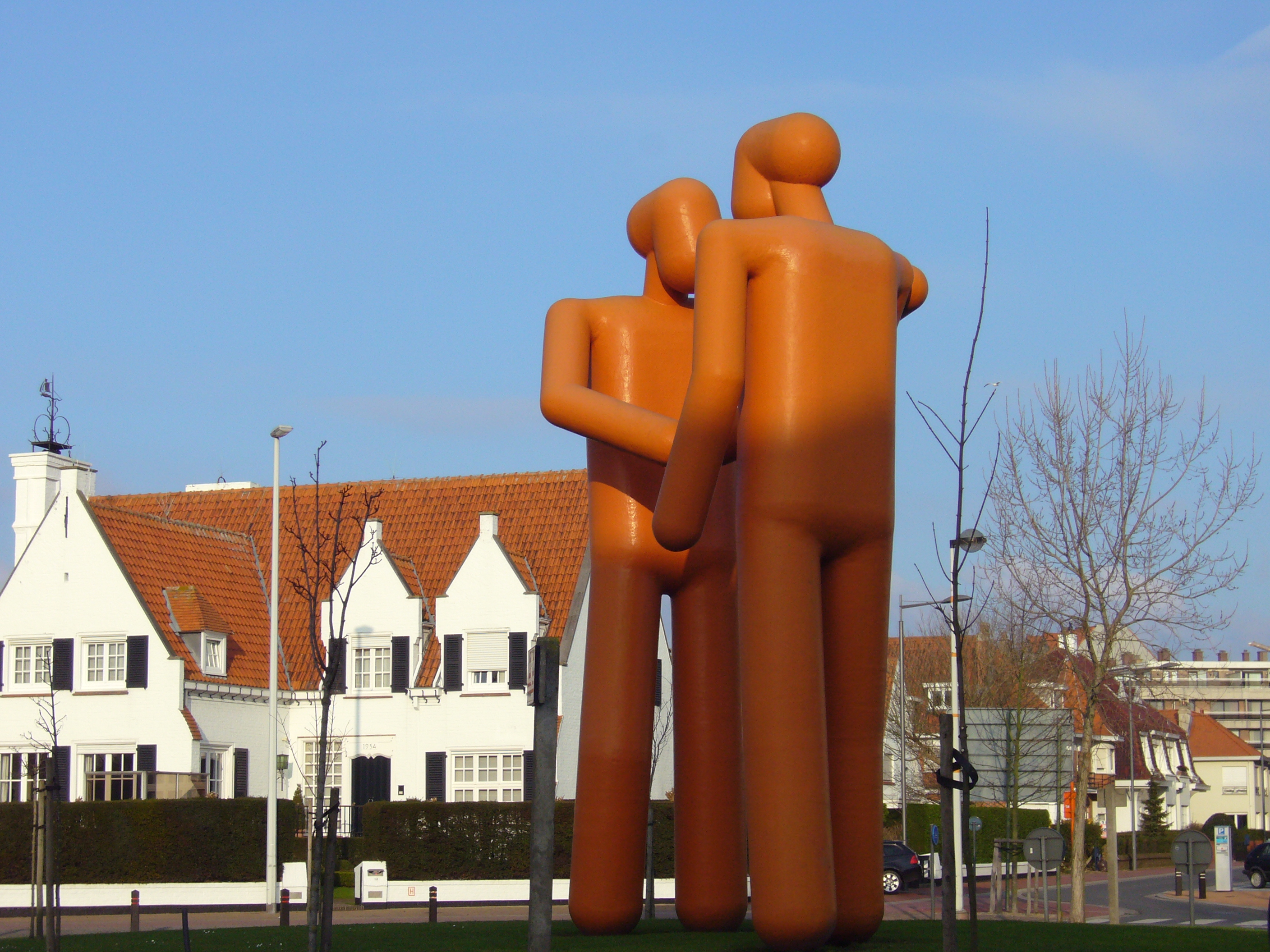
Sculpture by Joep van Lieshout

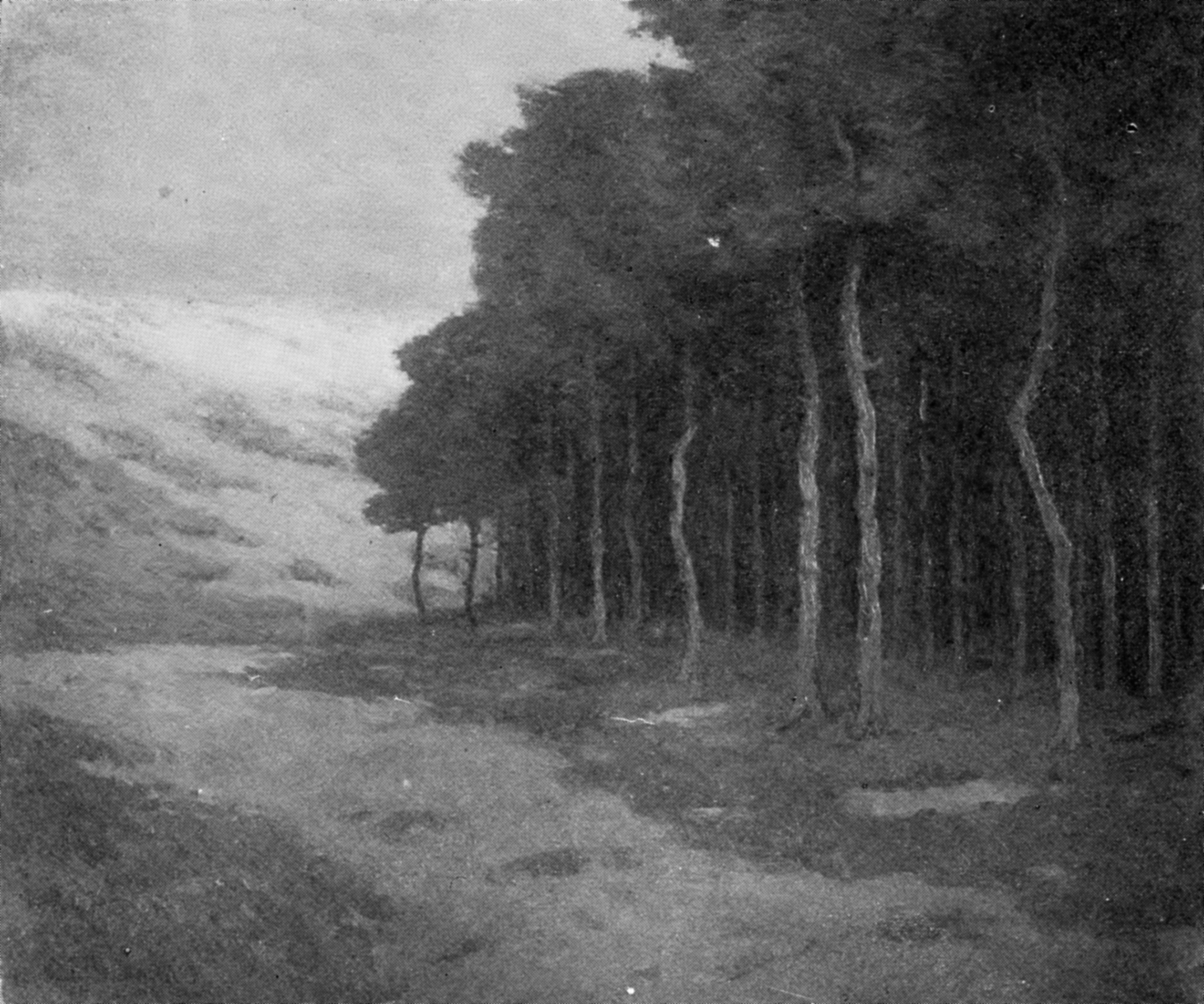
Pines at Knocke by Charles Warren Eaton

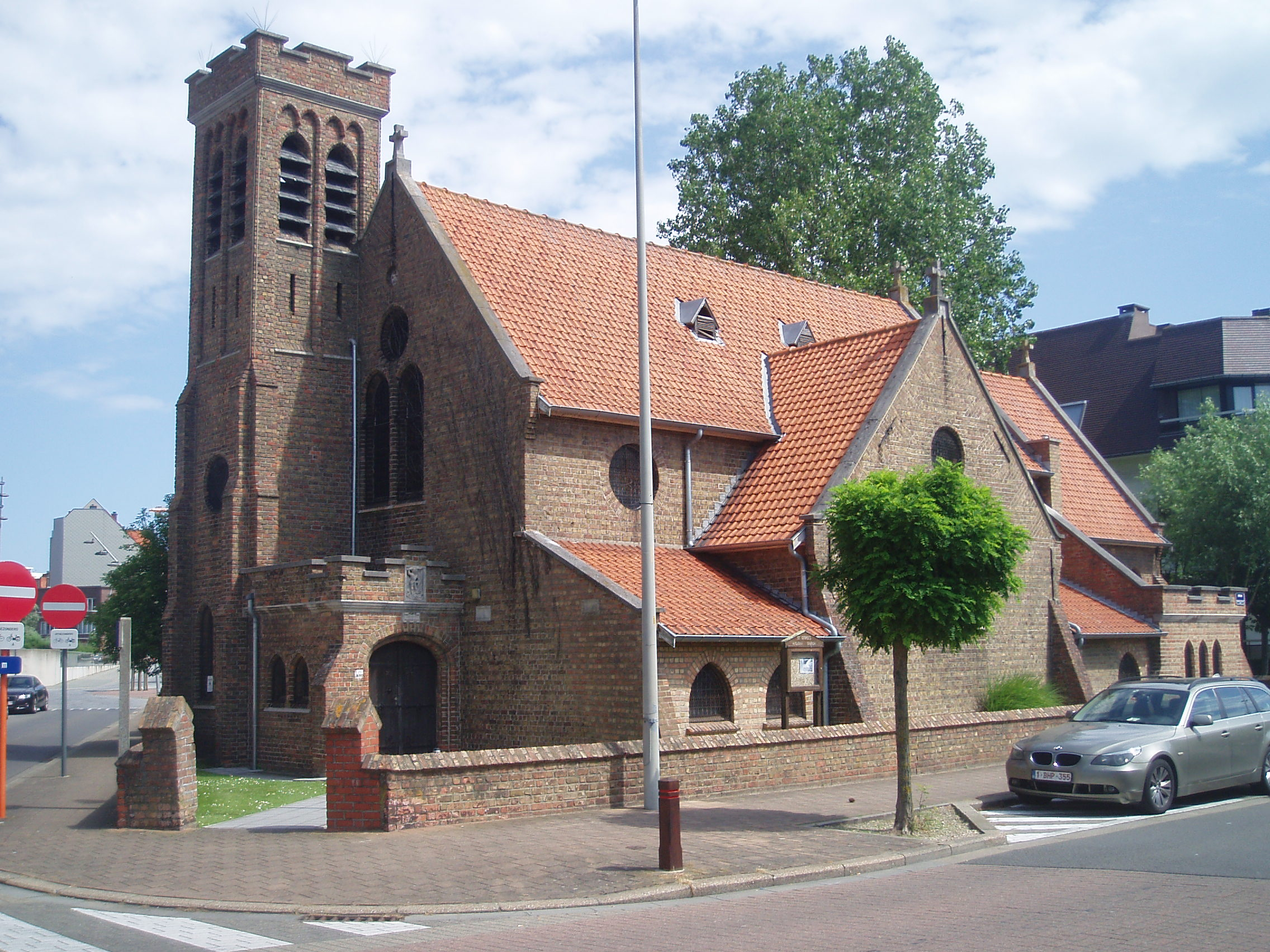
St George's Anglican Church

== Climate ==
Climate data for Knokke-Heist (1991−2020 normals)
Month	Jan	Feb	Mar	Apr	May	Jun	Jul	Aug	Sep	Oct	Nov	Dec	Year
Mean daily maximum °C (°F)	6.8 (44.2)	7.6 (45.7)	10.5 (50.9)	14.2 (57.6)	17.3 (63.1)	20.0 (68.0)	22.2 (72.0)	22.4 (72.3)	19.5 (67.1)	15.1 (59.2)	10.4 (50.7)	7.3 (45.1)	14.5 (58.1)
Daily mean °C (°F)	4.2 (39.6)	4.5 (40.1)	6.9 (44.4)	9.7 (49.5)	13.1 (55.6)	15.9 (60.6)	18.0 (64.4)	18.0 (64.4)	15.3 (59.5)	11.6 (52.9)	7.7 (45.9)	4.8 (40.6)	10.8 (51.4)
Mean daily minimum °C (°F)	1.6 (34.9)	1.4 (34.5)	3.2 (37.8)	5.2 (41.4)	8.9 (48.0)	11.8 (53.2)	13.8 (56.8)	13.6 (56.5)	11.1 (52.0)	8.1 (46.6)	4.9 (40.8)	2.4 (36.3)	7.2 (45.0)
Average precipitation mm (inches)	69.4 (2.73)	62.4 (2.46)	53.7 (2.11)	41.9 (1.65)	59.4 (2.34)	66.7 (2.63)	81.0 (3.19)	84.8 (3.34)	81.4 (3.20)	84.9 (3.34)	91.7 (3.61)	93.7 (3.69)	870.9 (34.29)
Average precipitation days (≥ 1.0 mm)	12.8	11.6	10.4	9.4	9.9	9.8	10.3	10.7	10.5	12.3	14.5	14.8	136.7
Mean monthly sunshine hours	68	89	150	207	234	234	236	221	171	124	71	56	1,861
Source: Royal Meteorological Institute

== See also ==
- Belgian Coast Tram
- Knokke railway station
