= Frieda Deschacht =

Belgian politician

Member of the Flemish Parliament
- Incumbent
- Assumed office 26 May 2019

Personal details
- Born: 21 October 1968 (age 57) Knokke, Belgium
- Political party: Vlaams Belang

Frieda Deschacht (born 1968) is a Belgian-Flemish politician and a member of the Flemish Parliament for Vlaams Belang since 2019.

Her husband Christian Verougstraete was a member of the Flemish Parliament for the Vlaams Blok and then the Vlaams Belang. Deschacht also became active in the party and was from 2006 to 2012 elected to the Provincial Council in West Flanders and served as a councilor in Ostend from 2007 to 2012. She was elected to the Flemish Parliament in 2019.
