= Tine van der Vloet =

Belgian politician

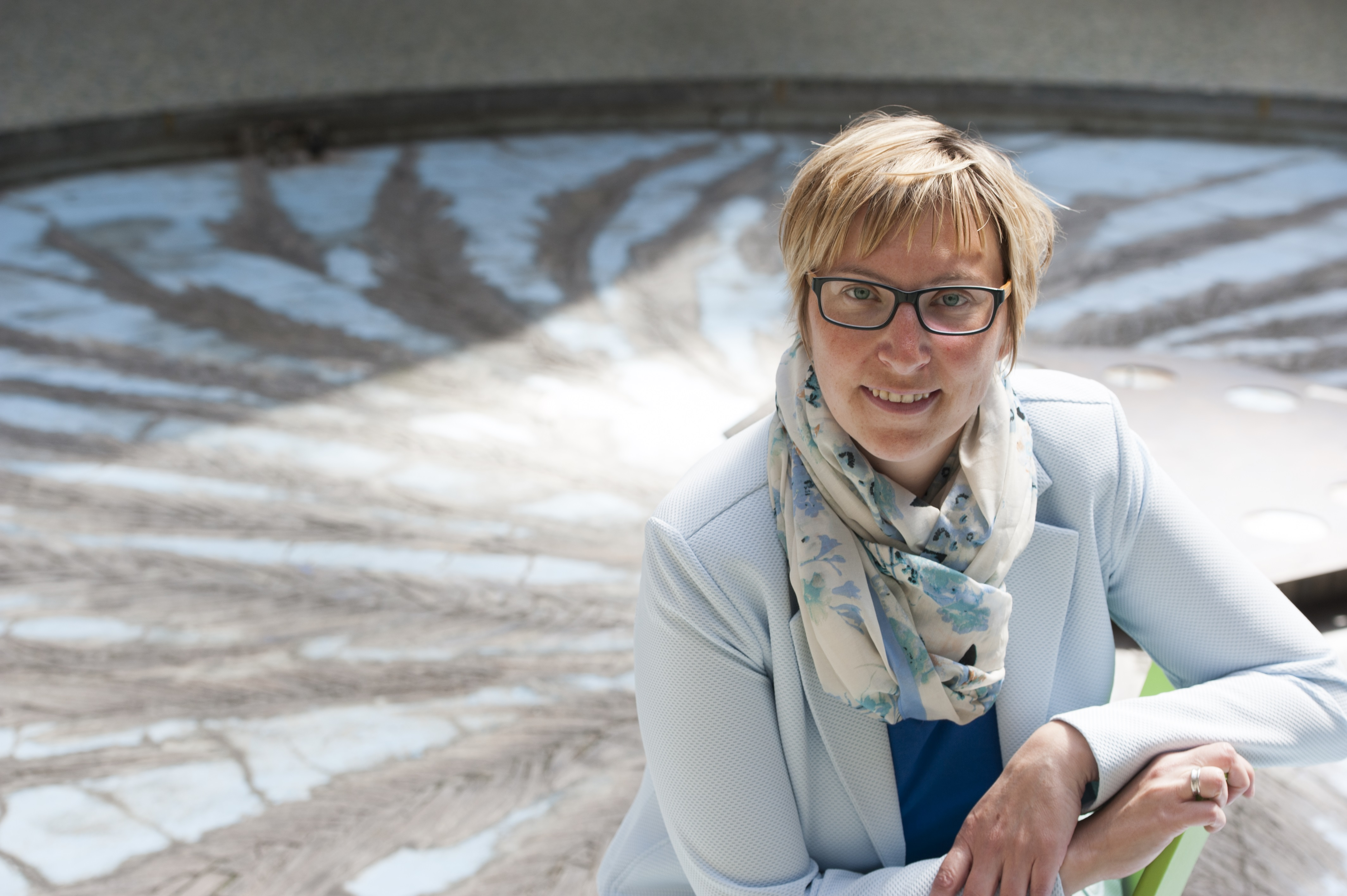

Member of the Flemish Parliament
- Incumbent
- Assumed office 25 May 2014

Personal details
- Born: 31 January 1978 (age 48) Zoersel
- Party: N-VA

Tine van der Vloet (31 January 1978) is a Belgian politician for the New Flemish Alliance (N-VA).

== Biography ==
Van der Vloet studied for a degree special needs education at the Karel de Grote University of Applied Sciences and Arts in Antwerp. In the municipal elections of 2012, she was party leader for N-VA in Merksplas and has been a councilor there since 2013. She also became chairman of the N-VA department in Merksplas. Since the 2014 Belgian regional elections she has been a member of the Flemish Parliament for the Antwerp list. She was re-elected 2019.
