= Erik Arckens =

Belgian politician

Personal details
- Born: 9 December 1961 (age 64) Schaerbeek
- Party: Vlaams Belang
- Occupation: university assistant

Erik Arckens (born 9 December 1961) is a Belgian politician who was a member of the Vlaams Belang.

== Life ==
Arckens's occupation was university assistant.

He was a member in the Parliament of the Brussels-Capital Region for the Vlaams Blok from 1999 till 2004. Since 2000 he was a councillor of Brussels. From 2004 till 2014 he was a member of the Flemish Parliament.

In July 2011, he left Vlaams Belang because he no longer felt at home in the party. Since leaving the party, he resided as an independent politician in the Flemish Parliament.
