= Cathy Coudyser =

Belgian politician

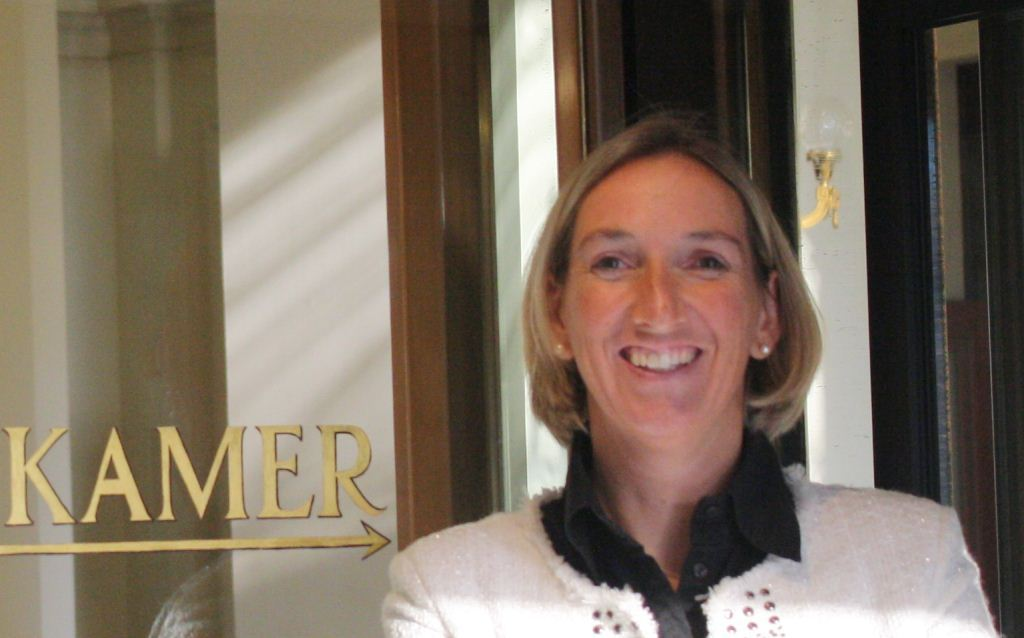

Member of the Flemish Parliament
- Incumbent
- Assumed office 25 May 2014

Member of the Chamber of Representatives
- In office 2012–2014

Personal details
- Born: 14 December 1969 (age 56) Knokke-Heist
- Party: N-VA

Cathy Coudyser (born 14 December 1969) is a Belgian politician and a member of the New Flemish Alliance.

== Biography ==
Coudyser is a native of Knokke-Heist in West Flanders. She worked as an investment advisor for KBC Bank before establishing a jewelry business with her husband. In 2003, she established a local branch for the N-VA in Knokke-Heist and was a municipal councilor for the party there until 2011. In 2014, she was appointed to the Member of the Chamber of Representatives following the resignation of Manu Beuselinck. She held this role until 2014 when she was elected to the Flemish Parliament. In the Flemish Parliament, she focuses on matters related to tourism.
