= Erik Tack =

Belgian politician

Personal details
- Born: 8 October 1958 (age 67) Ronse
- Party: Vlaams Belang
- Occupation: general practitioner

Erik Tack (born 8 October 1958) is a Belgian politician for Vlaams Belang.

== Life ==
Tack's occupation is general practitioner.

From 2001 until 2018 Tack was a councillor of Ronse.

He also was a member of the Flemish parliament from 2004 till 2014.
