= Jan Bertels =

Belgian politician (born 1968)

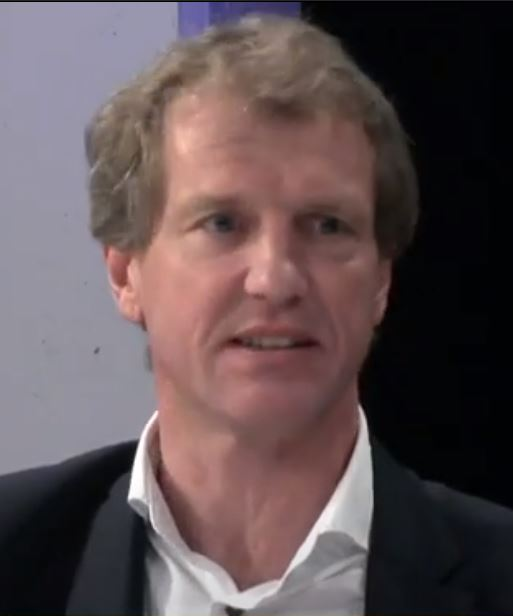
- Bertels in February 2019

Member of the Chamber of Representatives
- Incumbent
- Assumed office 9 June 2024
- Constituency: Antwerp
- In office 20 June 2019 – 1 November 2020
- Succeeded by: Gitta Vanpeborgh
- Constituency: Antwerp

Member of the Flemish Parliament
- In office 17 June 2014 – 25 May 2019
- Constituency: Antwerp

Personal details
- Born: 21 November 1968 (age 57) Herentals, Belgium
- Party: Vooruit
- Education: KU Leuven

Jan Bertels (born 21 November 1968) is a Belgian politician and member of the Chamber of Representatives. A member of Vooruit, he has represented Antwerp since June 2024. He had previously been a member of the Chamber of Representatives from June 2019 to November 2020. He was a member of the Flemish Parliament from June 2014 to May 2019.

Bertels was born on 21 November 1968 in Herentals. He grew up in Herentals and Olen and followed the Latin-Greek stream at college in Herentals. He studied law at KU Leuven, specialising in Belgian and European social security. He was an assistant at KU Leuven before working as a social security advisor to Socialist Party Different (SP.A) federal government ministers Jan Peeters and Johan Vande Lanotte. In 2003 he became director general of the Federal Public Service Social Security.

Bertels was appointed to the Public Centre for Social Welfare (OCMW) in Olen in 1995. He was appointed to the OCMW in Herentals in 2001. He was elected to the municipal council in Herentals at the 2006 local election. He became schepen (alderman) for finance and youth in 2007. He was re-elected at the 2012 local election. He became mayor of Herentals in January 2017 following the resignation of Jan Peeters. He was re-elected at the 2018 local election but lost the mayor-ship after the right wing New Flemish Alliance took control of the municipal council.

Bertels contested the 2009 regional election as the SP.A's 23rd placed candidate in Antwerp but was not elected. He was elected to the Flemish Parliament at the 2014 regional election. He was elected to the Chamber of Representatives at the 2019 federal election. He resigned from the Chamber of Representatives in November 2020 to become chief of staff to SP.A federal government minister Frank Vandenbroucke. He was re-elected to the Chamber of Representatives at the 2024 federal election.

Bertels is married and has two children. The family have lived in Noorderwijk since 2000.

Electoral history of Jan Bertels
Election	Constituency	Party	Votes	Result
2006 local	Herentals	Socialist Party Different	448	Elected
2009 regional	Antwerp	Socialist Party Different	1,852	Not elected
2012 local	Herentals	Socialist Party Different	680	Elected
2014 regional	Antwerp	Socialist Party Different	7,525	Elected
2018 local	Herentals	Socialist Party Different	2,613	Elected
2019 federal	Antwerp	Socialist Party Different	9,995	Elected
2024 federal	Antwerp	Vooruit	7,732	Elected
