= Sabine Poleyn =

Flemish politician

Sabine Poleyn (born 27 November 1973) is a Flemish politician for the Christian Democratic and Flemish party.

Born in Kortrijk, Belgium, Poleyn studied sociology at Katholieke Universiteit Leuven. Then she studied Development at the Université de Liège, and was an Erasmus student in Amsterdam.

After her training Poleyn combined two jobs; working for seven years in education and five years as coordinator of a network of Christian-inspired solidarity.

In 2000, Poleyn became a member of the municipal council of Zwevegem. In 2004, she was on the Flemish elected representative from West Flanders. In 2006, she won 1970 votes and she has since been in the municipal council. She is also a member of the Police of the area of Mira since 2001.

In the Flemish Parliament, Poleyn is on the committees for Education, Foreign Countries and Youth. She is the Youth and Development Spokesperson for CD&V.

In the elections of 25 May 2014, Poleyn was seventh on the Flemish list. She was not re-elected. At the end of 2014, the Flemish Government delegated her as a director at Syntra Flanders.

Poleyn was married to Stefaan Bonte in 2005.
