= Christian Verougstraete =

Belgian politician

Christian Verougstraete (born 11 September 1950 in Uccle) is a Belgian politician who served on the Flemish Parliament from 1995 to 2014.

He attended Our Lady College, Antwerp, where he would later study law. He was a member of the Flemish Parliament from 1995 to 2014, representing Veurne-Diksmuide-Ostend-Ypres from 1995 to 2003 on behalf of the Vlaams Blok. Between 2004 and 2014, Verougstraete served West Flanders and was affiliated with Vlaams Belang. Verougstraete's wife Frieda Deschacht was elected to the Flemish Parliament in her own right in 2019.
