= Kathleen Krekels =

Belgian politician

Kathleen Krekels (born 5 June, 1968 in Deurne) is a Belgian-Flemish politician for the New Flemish Alliance (N-VA).

Krekels has been a municipal councilor in Schilde since 2013 and since 2018 has been the alderman for the town. Since 2014, she has served as a member of the Flemish Parliament where she focuses on matters related to education and sits with the Education Committee.
