= Bart Martens =

Belgian politician

Senator
- In office 5 July 2007 – June 2011

Personal details
- Born: 27 August 1969 (age 56) Lier, Belgium
- Party: SP.A
- Website: www.bartmartens.be

Bart Martens (born 1969) is a Belgian politician and a member of the SP.A. He was elected as a member of the Belgian Senate in 2007.
