= Karlos Callens =

Belgian politician (1947–2023)

Mayor of Ardooie
- In office 1989 – 8 October 2023
- Preceded by: Roger Dewitte
- Succeeded by: TBD

Member of the Flemish Parliament
- In office 6 November 2002 – 24 May 2014

Personal details
- Born: 23 June 1947 Ardooie, Belgium
- Died: 8 October 2023 (aged 76) Ardooie, Belgium
- Party: Open Vld
- Education: University Faculties St Aloysius

Karlos Callens (23 June 1947 – 8 October 2023) was a Belgian politician of the Open Flemish Liberals and Democrats (Open Vld).

== Biography ==
Born in Ardooie on 23 June 1947, Callens earned a degree in commerce and finance from the University Faculties St Aloysius and became a lecturer in Kortrijk. He was elected to the municipal council of Ardooie in 1982 before becoming mayor in 1989. From 2000 to 2002, he served on the Provincial Council of West Flanders. He was a member of the Flemish Parliament from 2002 to 2014.

Karlos Callens died in Ardooie on 8 October 2023, at the age of 76.
