= Manuela Van Werde =

Belgian actress, television presenter and politician

- Born: April 8, 1959 (age 67); Neerpelt
- Occupations: Actress, politician

Manuela Van Werde (born 8 April 1959) is a Belgian actress, television presenter and politician from Flanders.

== Biography ==
Van Werde studied drama in Antwerp before attending the Studio Herman Teirlinck acting school. After graduating she appeared in the Flemish soap operas Het Park and Thuis. From July 2011 to January 2014, Van Werde presented the morning program Espresso on VRT.

== Political activities ==
In the 2014 Belgian regional elections, Van Werde announced she would stand for the Antwerp constituency in the Flemish Parliament for the New Flemish Alliance (N-VA) party. She was elected and sat on the committee for Culture, Media and Heritage. She was re-elected in 2019. Van Werde has also been a municipal councilor in Antwerp since 2018.
