= Eric Van Rompuy =

Flemish politician (born 1949)

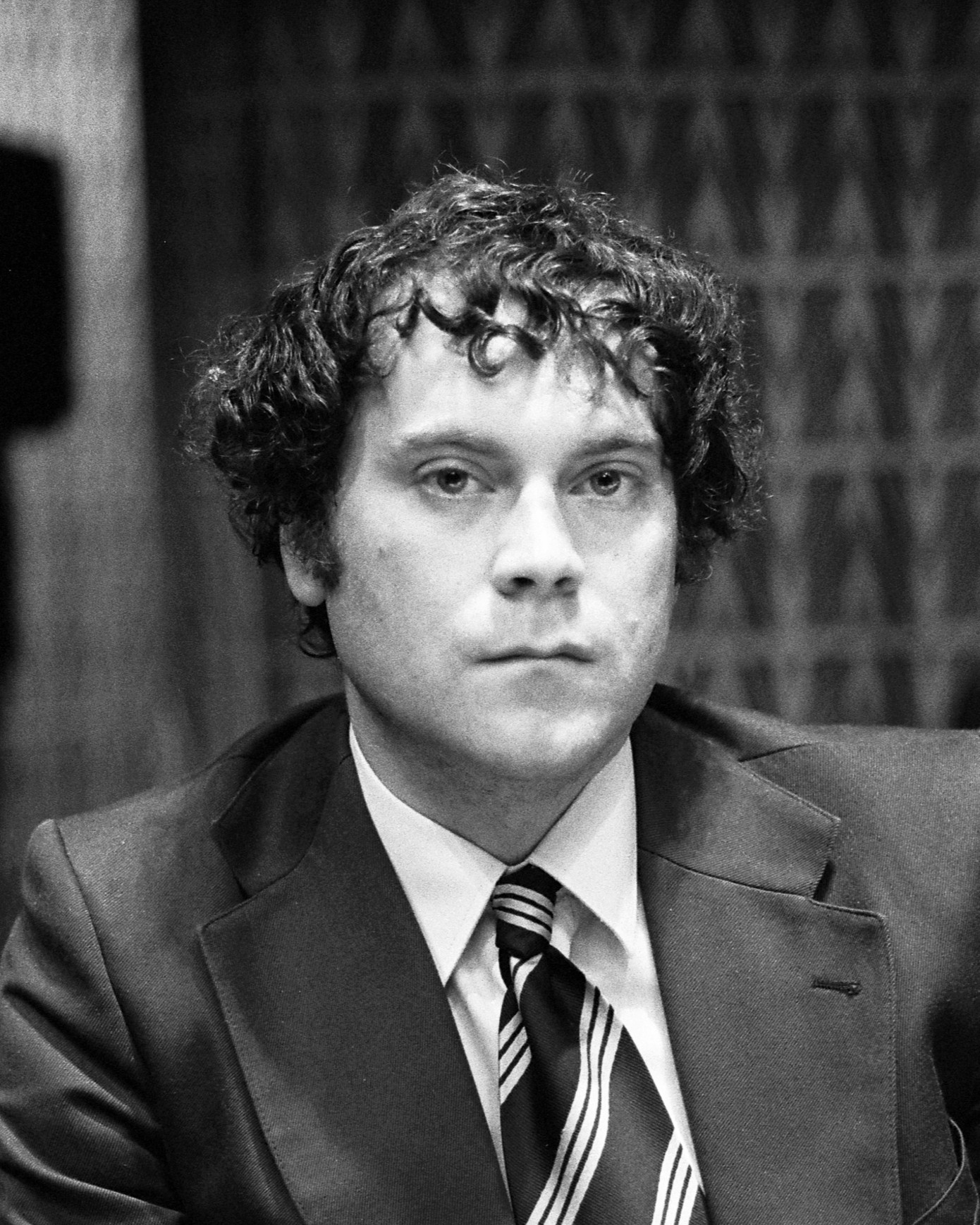
- Van Rompuy in 1981

Member of the Flemish Parliament
- Incumbent
- Assumed office 7 June 2009
- In office 13 June 2004 – 7 June 2009
- In office 13 June 1999 – 13 June 2004
- In office 21 May 1995 – 4 July 1995

Flemish minister of Economy, Enterprise, Agriculture and Media
- In office 20 June 1995 – 13 July 1999

Member of the Chamber of Representatives
- In office 13 October 1985 – 21 May 1995

Member of the European Parliament
- In office 1981–1984

Personal details
- Born: Eric Karel Paul Van Rompuy; 23 November 1949 (age 76) Uccle, Belgium
- Party: CD&V
- Spouse: Viviane Geuffens
- Education: KU Leuven
- Occupation: Politician
- Website: ericvanrompuy.be

Eric Karel Paul Van Rompuy (born 23 November 1949) is a Flemish politician.

== Biography ==
Van Rompuy was born on 23 November 1949, the son of the Vic Van Rompuy. He is the brother of Herman Van Rompuy. After obtaining his licentiate degree in economics, he obtained a baccalaureate degree in philosophy (1971). In 1975, he obtained a PhD in economics at the KU Leuven.

From 1976 until 1981, Van Rompuy worked at the Kredietbank as economist. In the meantime, he was elected in 1977 as national president of the Christian People's Party (CVP) youth wing (now CD&V). He remained president until 1983. In 1981, he had already become Member of Parliament of the European Parliament.

In 1981, Van Rompuy became a member of the local city council of Zaventem (1 January 1983 - 31 December 1988). In 1988, the CVP lost the elections. His national career started when he was elected as Member of Parliament in 1985. He would remain in that function until 1995. From 1991 until 1995, he was MP in the Flemish parliament.

In 1995, Van Rompuy became the first Flemish minister of Economy, Agriculture and Media. In 1999, he resigned after the huge electoral loss of his party. He is a member of the Flemish Parliament; he served in 1995, and has served consecutively since 1999.
