= Goedele Vermeiren =

Belgian politician

Member of the Flemish Parliament
- Incumbent
- Assumed office 7 July 2010

Personal details
- Born: 8 February 1962 (age 64) Mortsel, Antwerp
- Party: N-VA
- Website: http://www.n-va.be/cv/goedele-vermeiren

Goedele Vermeiren (born 8 February 1962 in Mortsel) is a Belgian politician affiliated with the N-VA. She became a member of the Flemish Parliament in 2010, replacing Sophie De Wit who took up her position as member of the Belgian Chamber of Representatives.
