= Dirk Van Mechelen =

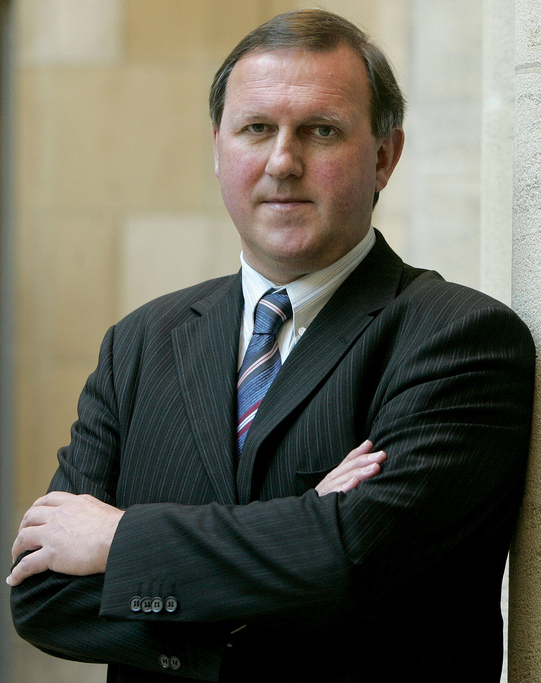
- Born: Dirk Louis Maria Van Mechelen; 27 August 1957 (age 69); Kapellen, Belgium
- Occupations: politician, businessman

Dirk Louis Maria Van Mechelen (born 27 August 1957) is a Belgian politician for Anders (formerly Open Flemish Liberals and Democrats) who served as Flemish Minister of Finance and Budget from 2001 to 2009 after having held the position for Town and Country Planning.

== Education ==
He obtained a degree in history from the Katholieke Universiteit Leuven (Leuven, Belgium) in 1980.

== Career ==
He started his professional career at Buchmann Optical Industries in Kapellen, the company of Jacky Buchmann. In 1982, he started his political career in the municipal council of Kapellen.

After the regional elections of 1999 he became Flemish minister of Town and Country Planning, Economy and Media. Since 2001 he is the mayor of Kapellen.

After the regional elections of 2004 he became Flemish minister of Finance and Budget and Town and Country Planning till 2009.

== Honours ==
- 2014: Grand officer in the Order of Leopold.
