= Sofie Joosen =

Belgian politician (born 1986)

Member of the Flemish Parliament
- Incumbent
- Assumed office 25 May 2014

Mayor of Duffel
- Incumbent
- Assumed office 2018

Personal details
- Born: 7 April 1986 (age 40) Duffel
- Party: N-VA

Sofie Joosen (born April 7, 1986) is a Belgian politician for the N-VA.

Joosen trained as a dental assistant before getting involved in politics. She was a board member for the N-VA in her hometown of Duffel and was co-founder of the local Jong N-VA youth wing branch. In the municipal elections of 2012, she was elected as a municipal councilor of Duffel. After the municipal elections of 2018, Joosen became mayor of Duffel, making her the youngest mayor of a town in Belgium at the time. Since the 2014 Belgian regional elections, she has been a member of the Flemish Parliament for the Antwerp list. In the parliament, she focuses on matters related to housing.
