= Annick De Ridder =

Flemish politician (born 1979)

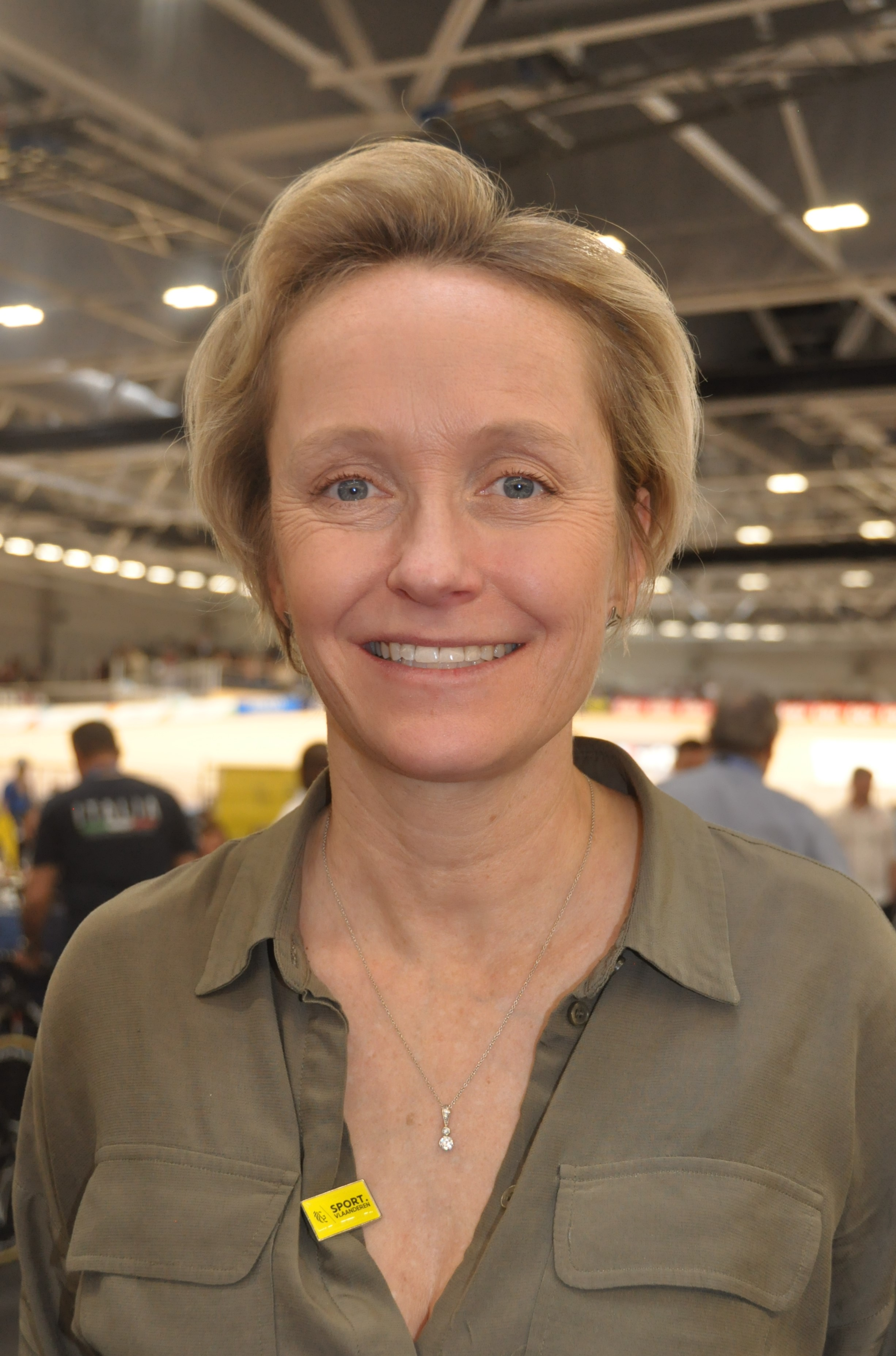
- Annick De Ridder (2025)

Member of the Flemish Parliament
- Incumbent
- Assumed office 2004

Municipal councilor of Antwerp
- In office 2007–2011

Personal details
- Born: 4 February 1979 (age 47) Antwerp, Belgium
- Party: N-VA (2013–); Open VLD (before 2013)

Annick De Ridder (born 4 February 1979) is a Belgian politician for the N-VA and a member of the Flemish Parliament.

== Biography ==
De Ridder graduated with a degree in law from UFSIA before completing a postgraduate degree in finance from KU Leuven. She worked for Katoen Natie and from 2014 to 2015 was again a director of the Antwerp Port Authority.

De Ridder initially began her political career in the Open VLD and was elected to Antwerp municipal council and the Flemish Parliament for the party in 2004 before stepping down in 2011 to focus on her professional career. She left the Open VLD in 2013 due to disagreeing with the course of the party after it chose to participate in Elio Di Rupo's government and switched her support to the New Flemish Alliance. In 2018, she was re-elected as a municipal councilor of Antwerp for the N-VA and returned to the Flemish Parliament in 2019.
