= Marc Hendrickx =

Belgian politician

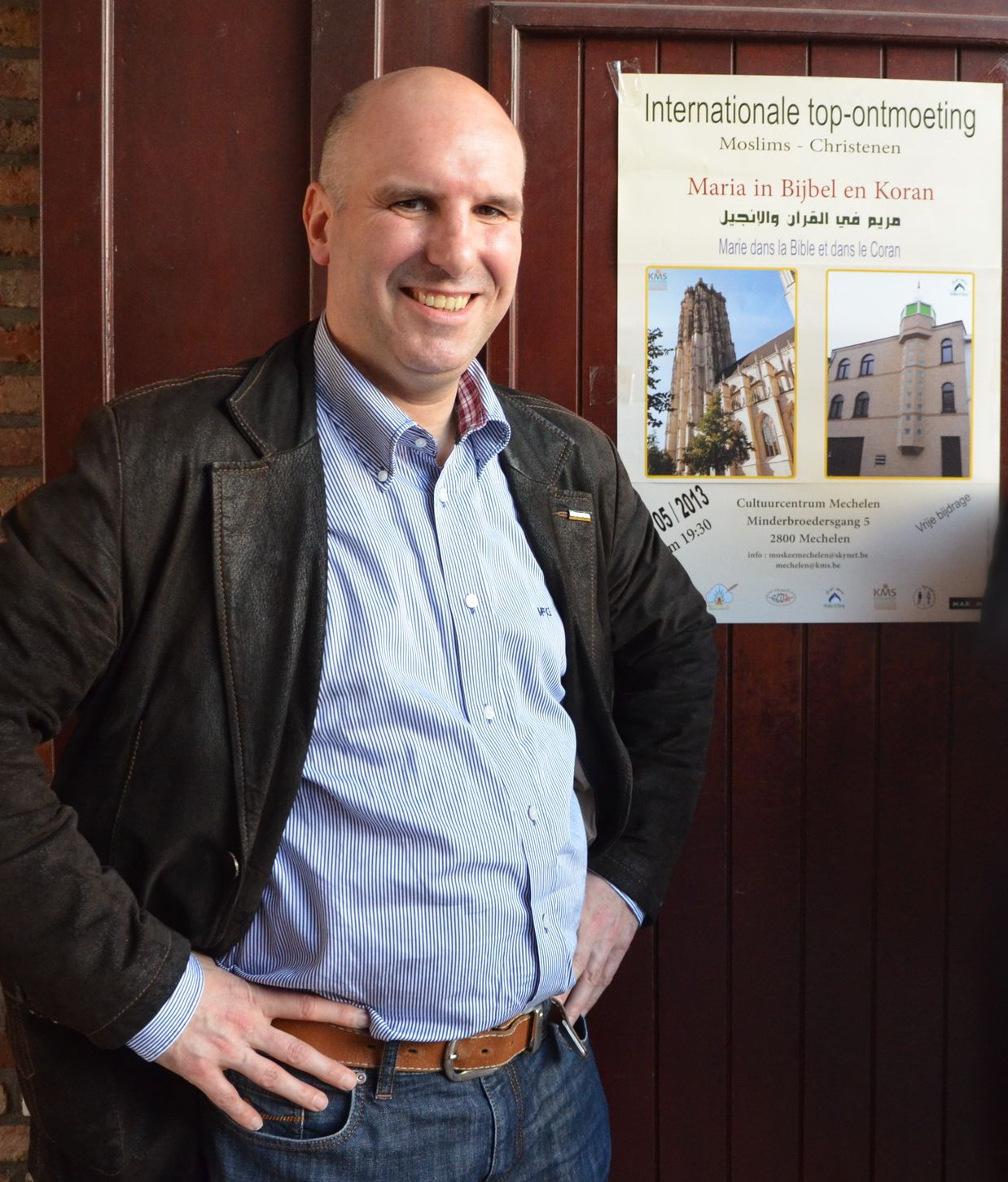
- Marc Hendrickx

Member of the Flemish Parliament
- Incumbent
- Assumed office 7 June 2009

Personal details
- Born: 8 August 1968 (age 57) Mechelen, Antwerp
- Party: N-VA
- Website: https://www.marc-hendrickx.be

Marc Hendrickx (born 8 August 1968 in Mechelen) is a Flemish politician and is affiliated to the N-VA. He is a municipal councillor of Mechelen since 2001. He was elected as a member of the Flemish Parliament in 2009.

Since 2010 he is an alternate member of the European Alliance group at the European Committee of the Regions.
