= Stefaan Sintobin =

Flemish politician

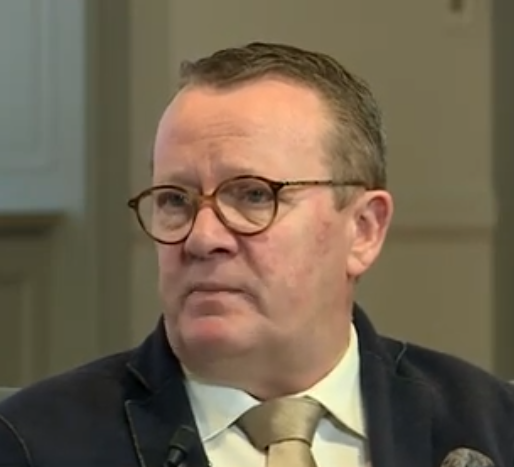
- In a 2019 interview

Member of the Flemish Parliament
- Incumbent
- Assumed office 2004

Personal details
- Born: 16 January 1960 (age 66) Izegem, Belgium
- Party: Vlaams Belang

Stefaan Sintobin (born 16 January 1960 in Izegem) is a Flemish politician for Vlaams Belang who has been a member of the Flemish Parliament since 2004.

== Biography ==
Sintobin worked for Blokker Holding as a retail manager before becoming a politician. In 2004, Sintobin was elected as a member of the Flemish Parliament for the Vlaams Belang (VB) party for the West Flanders region. In 2009, he was placed first place of the list for West Flanders after former VB leader Frank Vanhecke resigned his mandate in the Flemish Parliament. He was also re-elected in 2019. In the Flemish Parliament, he has been chairman of the Welfare, Public Health, Family and Poverty Reduction Committee since 2019. He has also served as a city councilor in Bruges since 2019 and was formerly a councilor in his home city of Izegem.
