= Vera Celis =

Belgian politician (born 1959)

Member of the Flemish Parliament
- Incumbent
- Assumed office 7 June 2009

Personal details
- Born: 6 August 1959 (age 66) Turnhout, Antwerp
- Party: N-VA
- Website: http://www.veracelis.be

Vera Celis (born 6 August 1959 in Turnhout) is a Belgian politician and is affiliated to the N-VA. She was elected as a member of the Flemish Parliament in 2009.
