= Danielle Godderis-T'Jonck =

Belgian politician

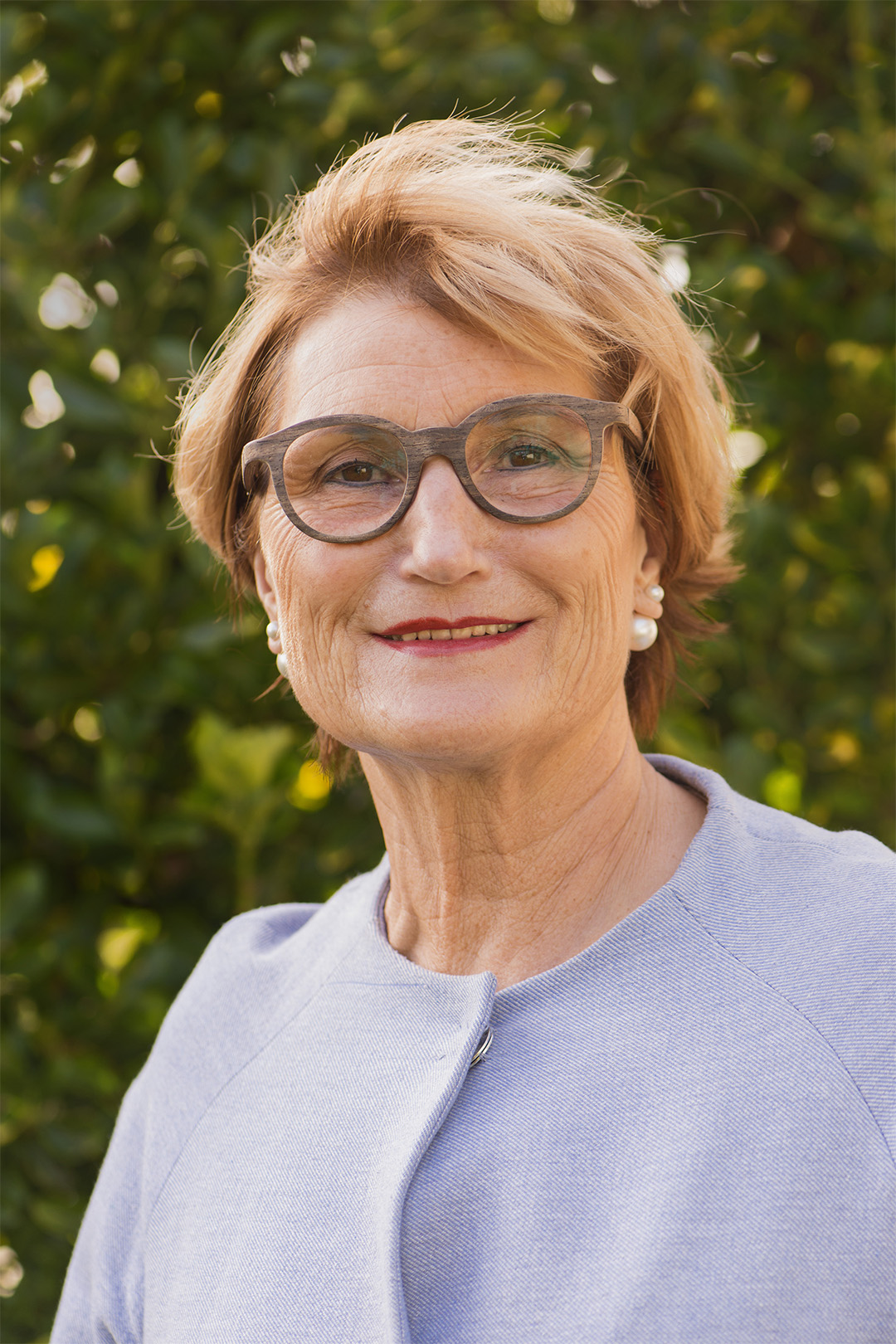

Member of the Flemish Parliament
- Incumbent
- Assumed office 7 June 2009

Personal details
- Born: 18 March 1955 (age 71) Ostend, West Flanders
- Party: N-VA
- Website: http://www.n-va.be/cv/danielle-godderis-tjonck

Danielle Godderis-T'Jonck (born 18 March 1955 in Ostend) is a Belgian politician and is affiliated to the N-VA. She was elected as a member of the Flemish Parliament in 2009.
