= List of members of the Flemish Parliament, 2024–2029 =

11th Parliament
- Established: 2024

Leadership
- Speaker: Liesbeth Homans

Structure

List of 124 deputies for the 2024-2029 legislature in the Flemish Parliament:

- 118 members elected by direct universal suffrage by the inhabitants of the Flemish Region,
- 6 members elected by the inhabitants of the Brussels-Capital Region.

This list includes the latest current composition, resulting from the 2024 Belgian regional elections.

== List by political group in parliament ==
=== New Flemish Alliance (31) ===
Constituency	Member of Parliament	Deputy replaced
Brussels-Capital Region	Karl Vanlouwe	
Antwerp	Annick De Ridder	
Antwerp	Koen Dillen	
Antwerp	Liesbeth Homans	
Antwerp	Jan Jambon	
Antwerp	Sofie Joosen	
Antwerp	Philippe Muyters	
Antwerp	Freya Perdaens	
Antwerp	Els van Doesburg	
Antwerp	Sanne Van Looy	
Antwerp	Paul Van Miert	
East Flanders	Koen Daniëls	
East Flanders	Lieven Dehandschutter	
East Flanders	Matthias Diependaele	
East Flanders	Andries Gryffroy	
East Flanders	Tomas Roggeman	
East Flanders	Sarah Smeyers	
West Flanders	Gijs Degrande	
West Flanders	Sander Loones	
West Flanders	Bert Maertens	
West Flanders	Eva Ryde	
West Flanders	Griet Vanryckegem	
Limburg	Zuhal Demir	
Limburg	Karolien Grosemans	
Limburg	Jan Peumans	
Limburg	Tom Seurs	
Flemish Brabant	Arnout Coel	
Flemish Brabant	Katrien Houtmeyers	
Flemish Brabant	Nadia Sminate	
Flemish Brabant	Ine Tombeur	
Flemish Brabant	Ben Weyts	

=== Vlaams Belang (31) ===
Constituency	Member of Parliament	Deputy replaced
Brussels-Capital Region	Dominiek Lootens-Stael	
Antwerp	Bart Claes	
Antwerp	Dries Devillé	
Antwerp	Filip Dewinter	
Antwerp	Els Sterckx	
Antwerp	Anke Van dermeersch	
Antwerp	Tom Van Grieken	
Antwerp	Bart Van Opstal	
Antwerp	Wim Verheyden	
East Flanders	Adeline Blancquaert	
East Flanders	Filip Brusselmans	
East Flanders	Guy D'haeseleer	
East Flanders	Johan Deckmyn	
East Flanders	Ilse Malfroot	
East Flanders	Kristof Slagmulder	
East Flanders	Freija Van den Driessche	
West Flanders	Yves Buysse	
West Flanders	Immanuel De Reuse	
West Flanders	Tom Lamont	
West Flanders	Carmen Ryheul	
West Flanders	Stefaan Sintobin	
West Flanders	Sarah T'Joens	
Limburg	Michiel Awouters	
Limburg	Roosmarijn Beckers	
Limburg	Mercina Claesen	
Limburg	Chris Janssens	
Limburg	Leo Pieters	
Flemish Brabant	Frédéric Erens	
Flemish Brabant	Jan Laeremans	
Flemish Brabant	Klaas Slootmans	
Flemish Brabant	Suzy Wouters	

=== Vooruit (18) ===
Constituency	Member of Parliament	Deputy replaced
Brussels-Capital Region	Hannelore Goeman	
Antwerp	Hannes Anaf	
Antwerp	Karim Bachar	
Antwerp	Caroline Gennez	
Antwerp	Kelly Van Tendeloo	
East Flanders	Kurt De Loor	
East Flanders	Burak Nalli	
East Flanders	Conner Rousseau	
East Flanders	Frederik Sioen	
East Flanders	Freya Van den Bossche	
West Flanders	Pablo Annys	
West Flanders	Nawal Maghroud	
West Flanders	Maxim Veys	
Limburg	Els Robeyns	
Limburg	Kris Verduyckt	
Flemish Brabant	Mohamed Ridouani	
Flemish Brabant	Katia Segers	
Flemish Brabant	Bieke Verlinden	

=== Christian Democratic and Flemish (16) ===
Constituency	Member of Parliament	Deputy replaced
Antwerp	Gilles Bultinck	
Antwerp	Katrien Schryvers	
Antwerp	Mien Van Olmen	
East Flanders	Robrecht Bothuyne	
East Flanders	Nicole de Moor	
East Flanders	Joke Schauvliege	
West Flanders	Hilde Crevits	
West Flanders	Bart Dochy	
West Flanders	Loes Vandromme	
West Flanders	Brecht Warnez	
Limburg	Jo Brouns	
Limburg	An Christiaens	
Limburg	Toon Vandeurzen	
Flemish Brabant	Katrien Partyka	
Flemish Brabant	Kris Poelaert	
Flemish Brabant	Peter Van Rompuy	

=== Workers' Party of Belgium (9) ===
Constituency	Member of Parliament	Deputy replaced
Antwerp	Jos D'Haese	
Antwerp	Raf Van Gestel	
Antwerp	Lise Vandecasteele	
Antwerp	Amina Vandenheuvel	
East Flanders	Debby Burssens	
East Flanders	Onno Vandewalle	
West Flanders	Ilona Vandenberghe	
Limburg	Gaby Colebunders	
Flemish Brabant	Line De Witte	

=== Groen (9) ===
Constituency	Member of Parliament	Deputy replaced
Brussels-Capital Region	Bram Jaques	
Brussels-Capital Region	Nadia Naji	
Antwerp	Kim Buyst	
Antwerp	Bogdan Vanden Berghe	
East Flanders	Fourat Ben Chikha	
East Flanders	Mieke Schauvliege	
West Flanders	Jeremie Vaneeckhout	
Flemish Brabant	Aimen Horch	
Flemish Brabant	Eva Platteau	

=== Anders (7) ===
Constituency	Member of Parliament	Deputy replaced
Antwerp	Tom Ongena	
Antwerp	Marianne Verhaert	
East Flanders	Stephanie D'Hose	
East Flanders	Egbert Lachaert	Left the policital group in September 2026 to continue as independent.
West Flanders	Jasper Pillen	
Limburg	Lydia Peeters	
Flemish Brabant	Eva De Bleeker	
Flemish Brabant	Gwendolyn Rutten	
Flemish Brabant	Maurits Vande Reyde	Left the party in April 2025 to continue as independent.

=== Team Fouad Ahidar (1) ===
Constituency	Member of Parliament	Deputy replaced
Brussels-Capital Region	M'Hamed Kasmi	

=== Independents (2) ===
Constituency	Member of Parliament	Deputy replaced
East Flanders	Egbert Lachaert	Left the political group Anders in September 2026 to become independent.
Flemish Brabant	Maurits Vande Reyde	Left the party Anders in April 2025 to become independent.
