= Steane =

Steane is both a surname and a given name. Notable people with the name include:

== Surname ==
- Andrew Steane, Professor of Physics at the University of Oxford
- Dick Steane (1939–2007), British athlete
- J. B. Steane (1928–2011), English music critic, musicologist, literary scholar, and teacher
- John Steane (born 1931), English former headmaster, archaeologist, and author
- Nina Steane (1932–1990, aka Nina Carroll), English painter

== Given name ==
- Steane Kremerskothen, Australian rules football player from Tasmania

== See also ==
- Steane code, mathematical tool introduced by Andrew Steane
- Steene
- Stene
- R v Steane, 1947 case decided by the English Court of Criminal Appeal
