= Herman De Reuse =

Belgian politician

Herman De Reuse (born Liedekerke, 3 May 1944 – 30 May 2018) was a Belgian lawyer and politician for Vlaams Blok and later Vlaams Belang.

De Reuse was elected to the Flemish Parliament during the first ever direct elections to the Flemish Parliament in 1995. He represented Vlaams Blok and later Vlaams Belang. In 2018, De Reuse died unexpectedly while on holiday in France. His son Immanuel De Reuse was elected to the Flemish Parliament in 2019.
