= Sterckx =

Sterckx is a surname. Notable people with the surname include:

- Arlette Sterckx (born 1964), Belgian television actress
- Dirk Sterckx (born 1946), Belgian politician
- Els Sterckx (born 1972), Belgian-Flemish politician
- Engelbert Sterckx (1792–1867), Belgian archbishop
- Ernest Sterckx (1922–1975), Belgian professional racing cyclist
- Leo Sterckx (1936–2023), Belgian cyclist
- Nina Sterckx (born 2002), Belgian weightlifter
- René Sterckx (born 1991), Belgian professional football player
- Roel Sterckx (born 1969), Flemish-British sinologist and anthropologist
