= Stebe =

Stebe is a surname. Notable people with the surname include:

- Cedrik-Marcel Stebe (born 1990), German tennis player
- Kathleen J. Stebe, American scientist and professor

== See also ==
- Stebe, a character and episode from Royal Crackers
- Steber
- Stene
