= Steber =

Steber is a surname. Notable people with the surname include:

- Eleanor Steber (1914–1990), American operatic soprano
- John Steber (1923–1975), American football player
- Maggie Steber, American documentary photographer

== See also ==
- Stebe
