= Project Durf =

Political action group in Belgium

Project Dare Project Durf
- Founder: Maurits Vande Reyde
- Founded: 4 September 2025
- Split from: Anders
- Membership: 4578
- Ideology: Conservative liberalism Economic liberalism Libertarianism
- Political position: Right-wing
- Colors: Orange; Blue
- Slogan: Meer welvaart door minder overheid More prosperity by less government

Website
- https://projectdurf.be/

Project Dare (Dutch: Project Durf) is a political action group founded by Maurits Vande Reyde, a member of the Flemish Parliament and former member of the Flemish liberal party Anders. It was launched on 4 September 2025.

== History ==
On 28 April 2025, Vande Reyde announced his departure from Anders (formerly referred to as Open VLD). He called the party "too left-wing" and claimed it had not pushed for a smaller government radically enough. At the same time, he announced he would create a "new political project" soon thereafter.

On 4 September 2025, Durf was launched and began its campaign of searching for signatories, supporters, donations and volunteers.

On 19 January 2026, Durf organised its first event, hosted in the Antwerp Stock Exchange Building. The event was attended by more than 500 people, ranging from economists, CEO's, entrepreneurs to journalists, TV-personalities (such as Inge Moerenhout) and politicians. Among them were Jean-Marie Dedecker (LDD) and Darya Safai (N-VA), both of whom are members of the Belgian House of Representatives.

== Ideology ==
Durf describes itself as a political action group and pushes for economically liberal principles, such as smaller government, less regulation, less taxes, diminishing bureaucracy, more competition and entrepreneurship. It criticizes the ways that mainstream Belgian political parties and governments have handled taxation policy and budget deficits, calling the Belgian fiscal system "extraordinarily complex and unfair".

It states that it welcomes people from all political backgrounds who share the same priorities of creating a smaller government. Despite Vande Reyde stating Durf is not a political party, he has expressed ambitions to influence Belgian politics by influencing the decisions of policymakers as well as working with incumbent members of parliaments.
