= Roosmarijn Beckers =

Belgian politician

Member of the Flemish Parliament
- Incumbent
- Assumed office 2019

Personal details
- Born: 23 October 1986 (age 39) Sint-Truiden, Belgium
- Party: Vlaams Belang (2004-2007, 2019-present)
- Other political affiliations: New Flemish Alliance (2007-2019)
- Education: Catholic University of Leuven

Roosmarijn Beckers (born 23 October 1986) is a Flemish politician and a member of the Flemish parliament for Vlaams Belang.

== Career ==
Beckers is the daughter of former Vlaams Belang politician Marleen Govaerts and has described herself as coming from a Flemish nationalist family. She obtained a master's degree in history from the Catholic University of Leuven. Her thesis and area of study focused on the treatment of Roma gypsies during the Holocaust. She was a history teacher before working as an assistant in her husband's law firm. Beckers is married with three children.

Beckers first joined the former Vlaams Blok party in 2003. In 2006 she was elected to the municipal council of Sint-Truiden for Vlaams Belang, but a year later decided to leave politics for a period due to conflicts within the party and because she considered Vlaams Belang's leadership to be misogynistic. In 2019, she was encouraged to return to the party by Tom Van Grieken and because she felt disappointed with the New Flemish Alliance party which she had switched her support to. In 2019, she was elected to the Flemish parliament for the Limburg constituency (nl). In the Flemish parliament she focuses on matters related to education and infrastructure.

She is also an opinion columnist for the blog site Doorbraak.
