= Draining law =

2005 Belgian law on state financing of political parties

The draining law (Dutch: droogleggingswet) or Belgian dry up law refers to a controversial law passed by the Belgian Federal Parliament in 2005 to cut funding by the federal state to "undemocratic" parties. Due to restrictions against campaign donations from private groups or individuals, Belgian political parties rely mostly on the state for funding.

Although the term "draining law" usually refers to the law passed in 2005, there are actually two so-called "draining laws":

- the law of 12 February 1999, inserting an article 15 in the law of 4 July 1989 regarding the limitation and control of the electoral expenses for the elections of the federal Chambers, the financing and the open accounts of the political parties, and of an article 16bis in the laws on the Council of State, coordinated on 12 January 1973
- the law of 17 February 2005, modifying the coordinated laws on the Council of State of 12 January 1973 and the law of 4 July 1989 regarding the limitation and control of the electoral expenses for the elections of the federal Chambers, the financing and the open accounts of the political parties

The law of 12 February 1999 inserted an article 15 in the law regarding party financing, which states that if a political party by its own effort or by the effort of its components, lists, candidates or elected officials, clearly and with several similar signs, shows that it is hostile towards the rights and liberties guaranteed under the European Convention on Human Rights, it can be stripped of its funding by the Council of State. This is why in French, the law is also referred to as the "law to cut funding to anti-liberty parties" ("loi permettant de priver les partis liberticides de leur financement"). However, this provision could not be implemented until the passage of the law of 17 February 2005.

== Vlaams Belang ==
At the present time an attempt to use the law would most likely be made against the far-right Flemish party Vlaams Belang. A Belgian court ruled in 2004 that the party's predecessor Vlaams Blok had encouraged discrimination against foreigners.
