= Freija Van den Driessche =

Member of the Flemish Parliament
- Incumbent
- Assumed office 9 June 2024

Personal details
- Born: Freija Van den Driessche; 8 January 1989 (age 37) Aalst, Belgium
- Party: Vlaams Belang
- Education: Ghent University

Freija Van den Driessche (born 8 January 1989 in Aalst) is a Belgian politician of the Vlaams Belang party who has served as a member of the Flemish Parliament since 2024 representing the East Flanders constituency.

== Biography ==
Van den Driessche was born in 1989 in Aalst. She studied pharmaceutical sciences at Ghent University followed by a master's and then a PhD in pharmaceutical microbiology at the same university. After graduating she worked as project manager for Pfizer.

She became active in the Nationalistische Studentenvereniging during her time at university where she met future VB leader Tom Van Grieken, who was active in the Antwerp branch and the national NSV board at the time. In 2024, she worked as a policy advisor on health issues for Vlaams Belang faction in the Federal Parliament. She was also a presenter on VBTV, the party's online broadcast channel. During the 2024 Belgian regional elections she was elected to the Flemish Parliament for the East Flanders region.
