= Bob De Brabandere =

Belgian politician (born 1987)

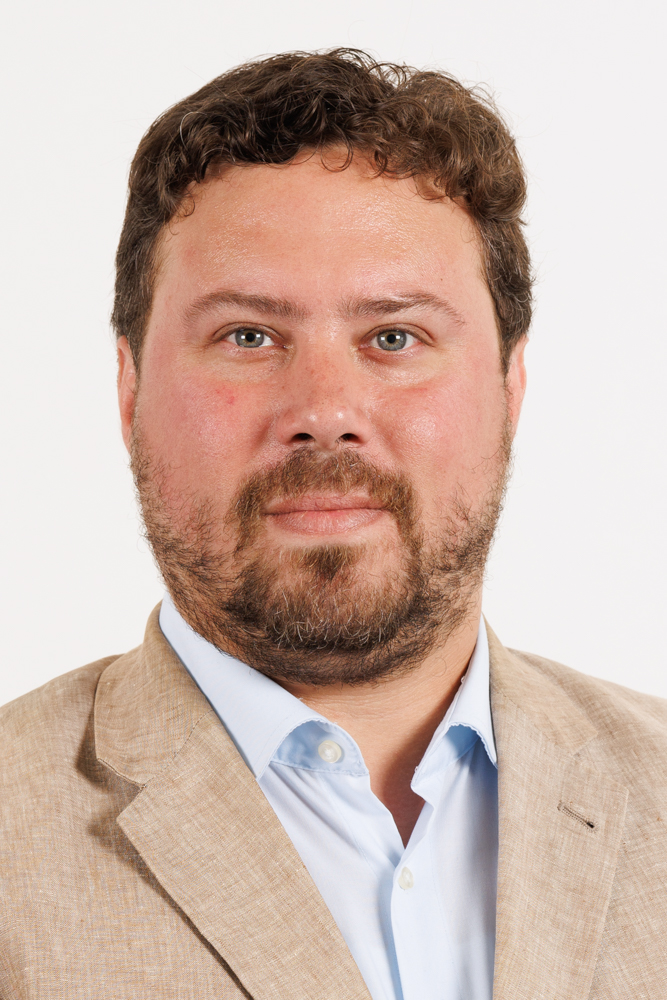
De Brabandere

Bob De Brabandere (born 31 August 1987) is a Belgian politician for the Flemish nationalist Vlaams Belang party in the Belgian Senate.

== Biography ==
Brabandere was born on 31 August 1987 in Ghent. He studied at the Ghent University before working as a political secretary to VB leader Tom Van Grieken. He also served as chairman of the VB chapter in the 19th municipality of Brussels. In 2019, Brabandere was co-opted by VB to the Senate as state senator. Brabandere also serves as a member of the Council of Europe in the European Conservatives Group and Democratic Alliance along with Van Grieken. In this role, Brabandere has campaigned against big tech censorship which he claims threatens freedom of speech.

Outside of politics, Brabandere lives in Berchem-Sainte-Agathe with his Estonian born wife, a model who was the former Miss Estonia.
