= Dries Devillé =

Belgian lawyer and politician (born 1988)

Member of the Flemish Parliament
- Incumbent
- Assumed office 2024

Personal details
- Born: Dries Devillé; 5 June 1988 (age 38) Brussels, Belgium
- Party: Vlaams Belang
- Education: KU Leuven; Vrije Universiteit Brussel

Dries Devillé (born 5 June 1988 in Brussels) is a Belgian lawyer and politician of the Flemish nationalist Vlaams Belang party. He has been a member of the Flemish Parliament since 2024 representing the Antwerp constituency.

== Biography ==
Devillé obtained a master's degree in law from KU Leuven and then studied notary law at the Vrije Universiteit Brussel. Professionally, he was a lawyer at the Brussels Bar between 2013 and 2018, and then a real-estate and corporate lawyer as well as working as a legal assistant in a notary office.

Devillé was part of the Nationalistische Studentenvereniging organization as a student where he met future VB leader Tom Van Grieken. In 2003 he joined the Vlaams Blok party which became Vlaams Belang a year later. He was a member of the national board for the Vlaams Belang Jongeren. In 2006, he was elected as a municipal councilor in Halle at the age of 18 and was the youngest councilor elected at the time. He held the position until 2018 when he resigned to take a break from politics for his legal career and because he was moving to Mechelen. However, he also led a legal campaign in Halle to prevent the construction of a new mosque. During the 2024 Belgian regional elections and stood as a candidate in the Flemish Parliament and was elected to the Antwerp constituency.
