= Tom Lamont (politician) =

Belgian politician (born 1994)

Member of the Flemish Parliament
- Incumbent
- Assumed office 2024

Personal details
- Born: 16 November 1994 (age 31) Ghent, Belgium
- Party: Vlaams Belang
- Education: Hogeschool Gent; Vlerick Business School

Tom Lamont (born 16 November 1994 in Ghent) is a Belgian politician of the Vlaams Belang party who has served as a member of the Flemish Parliament since 2024 representing the West Flanders constituency.

== Biography ==
Lamont was born in Ghent in 1994 and grew up in Avelgem before moving to Stene near Ostend where he currently lives.

He initially trained as a teacher at the Hogeschool Gent graduating with a degree in secondary education before completing a course in business management at the Vlerick Business School. As a student, he was involved in the Katholiek Vlaams Hoogstudentenverbond (KVHV) chapter in Ghent. After graduating, Lamont worked as a manager for the BMW Group and was chairman of the JCI Waregem think-tank for young entrepreneurs between the ages of 18 and 40.

In 2015, he became active in the Vlaams Belang Jongeren and since 2022 has served as vice-chairman of the organization. In 2020, he worked as a volunteer for the Vlaams Belang faction in the federal parliament. During the 2024 Belgian regional elections, Lamont was elected to the Flemish Parliament.
