= Sarah T'Joens =

Belgian politician

Member of the Flemish Parliament
- Incumbent
- Assumed office 2024

Personal details
- Born: Dries Devillé; 30 August 1991 (age 35) Kortrijk, Belgium
- Party: Vlaams Belang
- Education: Hogeschool West-Vlaanderen

Sarah T'Joens (born 30 August 1991 in Kortrijk) is a Belgian politician of the Flemish nationalist Vlaams Belang party. She has been a member of the Flemish Parliament since 2024 representing the West Flanders constituency.

== Biography ==
T'Joens was born in Kortrijk before growing up in Wervik. She gained a bachelor's degree in travel and tourism management from the Hogeschool West-Vlaanderen before working in marketing for a cruise ship company and then for a construction firm.

She became involved in politics when helping to relaunch the Wervik chapter of Vlaams Belang. During the 2024 Belgian regional elections she was elected to the Flemish Parliament.
