= Klaas Slootmans =

Belgian politician

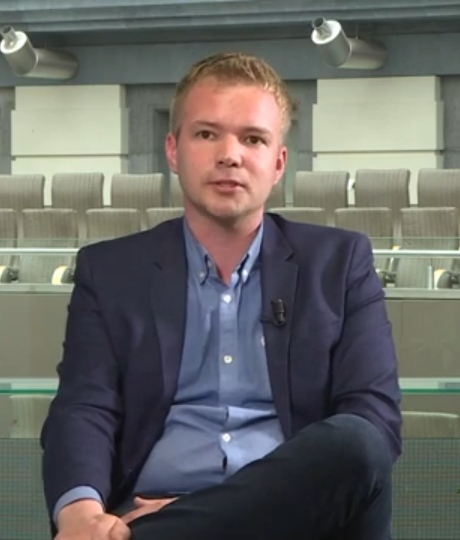

Member of the Flemish Parliament
- Incumbent
- Assumed office 2019

Member of the Belgian Senate
- Incumbent
- Assumed office 2014

Personal details
- Born: Klaas Slootmans; 8 September 1983 (age 41); Halle, Belgium
- Political party: Vlaams Belang

Klaas Slootmans (born 8 September 1983 in Halle, Belgium) is a Belgian-Flemish politician for the Vlaams Belang party who currently serves as a member of the Flemish Parliament for the Flemish Brabant region. He was first elected in 2019. Following his election he was designated as a Senator by the party. Slootmans graduated with a master's degree in political science from the Free University of Brussels before becoming a politician.
