= Carmen Ryheul =

Belgian politician

Member of the Flemish Parliament
- Incumbent
- Assumed office 26 May 2019

Personal details
- Born: 13 April 1971; Lubumbashi, DRC
- Political party: Vlaams Belang

Carmen Ryheul (born 13 April, 1971) is a Belgian politician and a member of the Flemish Parliament for the Vlaams Belang party.

== Biography ==
Ryheul was born in Élisabethville in the Belgian Congo (now Lubumbashi in the Democratic Republic of Congo) in 1971. She worked as a market coordinator for a travel agency until 2014 and then as a marketing manager for a space sunshade manufacturing company based in Gullegem until her election to the Flemish Parliament.

Ryheul was elected as a councilor for Vlaams Belang in Kortrijk in 2019 where she also serves on the party's board. In May 2019, she was elected to the Flemish Parliament for the VB. In the Flemish parliament, she serves on the committee for Environment, Nature, Spatial Planning and Energy.
