= Immanuel De Reuse =

Belgian politician

Member of the Flemish Parliament
- Incumbent
- Assumed office 2019

Personal details
- Born: Immanuel De Reuse; 11 July 1971 (age 53); Roeselare, Belgium
- Political party: Vlaams Belang

Immanuel De Reuse (born Roeselare, 7 November 1971) is a Belgian-Flemish politician for Vlaams Belang and a member of the Flemish Parliament.

== Biography ==
De Reuse is the son of Vlaams Blok politician Herman De Reuse who was an MP in the Chamber of Representatives. He worked as a branch manager for the Leen Bakker furniture company in Roeselare. De Reuse encountered controversy in 2012 when a female coworker at Leen Bakker accused him of sexual assault which led to De Reuse being fired from his job, despite De Reuse protesting his innocence. However, De Reuse was subsequently cleared of wrongdoing after the charges were dropped. Afterwards he worked as a manager for the Venalis Veilinghouders auction company.

De Reuse was elected to the Flemish Parliament during the 2019 Belgian regional elections on the West Flanders list. In the Flemish Parliament, he has sat on the Committee for Welfare, Public Health, Family and Poverty Reduction and the Flemish committee for implementing measures against COVID-19.

In 2020, De Reuse caused a stir during a debate in the Flemish Parliament in which he appeared to state that a returning ISIS fighter from Syria to Belgium should be shot in the neck. After his remark was deemed "inappropriate" by N-VA politician Nadia Sminate who had initiated the debate, De Reuse responded by stating that ISIS fighters "do not belong in our society."
