= Bart Van Opstal =

Member of the Flemish Parliament
- Incumbent
- Assumed office 2024

Personal details
- Born: Bart Van Opstal; 23 November 1974 (age 51) Herentals, Belgium
- Party: Vlaams Belang

Bart Van Opstal (born 23 November 1974 in Herentals) is a Belgian politician of the Flemish nationalist Vlaams Belang party and former police officer and businessman. He has been a member of the Flemish Parliament since 2024 representing the Antwerp constituency.

== Biography ==
=== Early life and career ===
Van Opstal was born in Herentals in 1974. From 1992 to 2000 he served as a police officer in Antwerp for the Belgian Gendarmerie. In 2000, he participated in the first series of the Belgian edition of the reality show Big Brother in which he finished in second place but resigned from his police job as a result of his participation in the program. In 2004, he co-founded the Red Lierse campaign to help raise funds for the football club Lierse SK and afterwards worked in the club's catering and events department. He also owned a Lierse themed cafe until 2013 before working in the real estate sector.

=== Politics ===
Van Opstal first worked as a volunteer for the former Vlaams Blok party in 1992 but did not seriously get involved in politics until joining Vlaams Belang in 2020 where he founded a local branch of the party in Olen. During the 2024 Belgian regional elections, he was elected to the Flemish Parliament for the Antwerp constituency.
