= Stene =

Stene is a surname. Notable people with the surname include:

- Andreas Stene (born 1991), Norwegian ice hockey player
- Helga Stene (1904–1983), Norwegian educator, feminist and resistance member
- Jørgine Stene Sørensen (1905–1997), Norwegian chemist
- Nic Stene (1921–2006), Norwegian speed skater
- Øyvind Stene (born 1947), Norwegian engineer and businessperson
- Randi Stene (born 1963), Norwegian opera singer and mezzo-soprano
- Robert Stene (born 1983), Norwegian soccer player
- Vibeke Stene (born 1978), Norwegian soprano

== See also ==
- Stene, Belgium
- Stene Point, South Orkney Islands
- Steane
- Steene
