= Sanne Van Looy =

Belgian politician (born 1991)

Member of the Flemish Parliament
- Incumbent
- Assumed office 9 June 2024

Personal details
- Born: 26 February 1991 (age 35) Deurne, Belgium
- Party: New Flemish Alliance

Sanne Van Looy (born 26 February 1991) is a Belgian politician of the New Flemish Alliance party, she has served as a Member of the Flemish Parliament since 2024 representing the Antwerp constituency.

== Biography ==
Van Looy was born in Deurne and grew up in Malle, Flanders where she attended school before studying in Italy and graduating with a degree from the University of Bologna. She then obtained a master's degree in history at KU Leuven before completing postgraduate studies in education at the University of Antwerp in 2014. Afterwards, she worked as a secondary school teacher in Hoogstraten. In 2022, she worked as a parliamentary assistant to N-VA politicians Kathleen Krekels and in 2024 was an advisor in the office of Flemish minister Zuhal Demir on education.

In 2016, she was elected as a councilor for the N-VA in Malle and was appointed chairwoman of the N-VA's Malle branch. From 2019 to 2022 she served as an alderman for social mobility. In the 2024 Belgian regional elections Van Looy was elected to the Flemish Parliament.
