= Johan Deckmyn =

Belgian politician

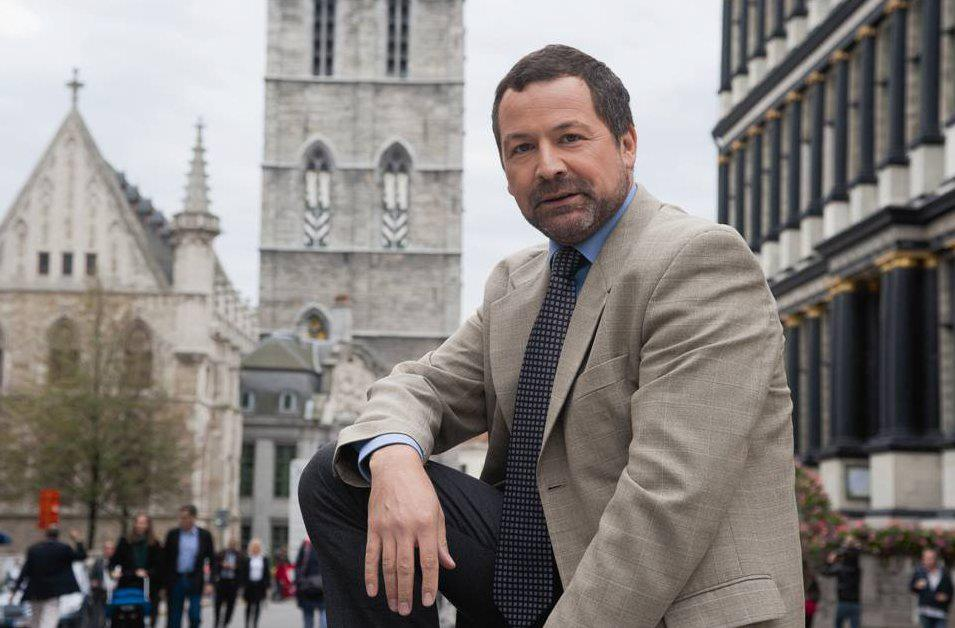
- Deckmyn at Ghent city hall

Member of the Flemish Parliament
- Incumbent
- Assumed office 2019

Member of the Flemish Parliament
- In office 2004–2014

Personal details
- Born: 21 December 1967 (age 58) Ghent, Belgium
- Party: Vlaams Belang
- Education: University of Antwerp

Johan Deckmyn (born 21 December 1967) is a Belgian-Flemish politician and a member of the Vlaams Belang party.

== Biography ==
Deckmyn studied computer science at Hogeschool Gent before becoming the director of an IT company.

=== Political career ===
Deckmyn became active in the Vlaams Blok Jongeren, the youth wing of the former Vlaams Blok party and the nationalist student association VSG (Flemish Students Ghent) in the 1980s. In 1994, he became a provincial councilor in East Flanders for Vlaams Blok. In 2004, he was elected to the Flemish parliament for the reconfigured Vlaams Belang party and remained in this role until 2014. In 2019, he was re-elected to the Flemish parliament. Since 2011, he has been the group chairman of Vlaams Belang in the Ghent city council.

=== Suske & Wiske controversy ===
On 9 January 2011, Deckmyn produced a parody of the Suske & Wiske comic De Wilde Weldoener (The Wild Benefactor) which was distributed on calendars to guests attending the Vlaams Belang New Year's reception in Ghent. Subsequently, Suske & Wiske's publisher WPG Uitgevers filed a lawsuit against Deckmyn for copyright infringement and as Willy Vandersteen, the author of the comic, had written in his will that his comics could never be used for political purposes. In the first instance Deckmyn was convicted, however he appealed the verdict. The case was dropped in 2019 for taking too long.

=== Visit to Emirdağ ===
At the end of 2011, Deckmyn and fellow Vlaams Belang politician Tanguy Veys visited the Turkish town of Emirdağ as part of a campaign called Emirdağ needs you in which the Vlaams Belang chapter in Ghent wanted to convince people of Turkish origin to return to Turkey. During the visit, Deckmyn spoke to local MPs and the mayor of the Emirdağ. The trip led to Ghent councilor and sp.a politician Resul Tapmaz (who is of Turkish descent) making insulting statements about Vlaams Belang. Deckmyn filed a complaint against Tapmaz for slander and defamation. The court ruled that Tapmaz's statements were offensive but were not defamation and dismissed the complaint.
