= John Steane (archaeologist) =

British headmaster, archaeologist, and author (1931–2024)

- Born: John M. Steane; 3 May 1931; Balham, London, England
- Died: 12 April 2024 (aged 92)
- Education: Dulwich College; Magdalen College, Oxford
- Occupations: Headmaster, archaeologist
- Employer(s): Kettering Grammar School; Oxfordshire County Council; Kellogg College, Oxford
- Known for: Archaeology
- Notable work: The Archaeology of Medieval England and Wales (1984); The Archaeology of the Medieval English Monarchy (1993)
- Spouse(s): Nina Carroll, remarried after Nina's death to Elaine Steane MBE (nee Fullard)
- Children: 3 (1 son, 2 daughters)

John M. Steane (3 May 1931 – 12 April 2024) was a British headmaster and archaeologist.

== Early life and career ==
John Steane was born in Balham, London on 3 May 1931. He was educated at Dulwich College and then Magdalen College, Oxford, where he studied for a degree in Modern History.

From 1964 to 1976, Steane was Headmaster of Kettering Grammar School. He then became County Archaeologist for Oxfordshire during 1976–1990). He was also a consultant archaeologist and part-time tutor at Kellogg College, Oxford, within the Oxford University Department for Continuing Education.

Steane undertook research into various aspects of the historic landscape, such as fishponds, palaces, and parks. He was the author of the following books:

- The Northamptonshire Landscape (1974)
- Peopling Past Landscapes (with B.F. Dix, 1978)
- The Archaeology of Medieval England and Wales (1984)
- The Archaeology of the Medieval English Monarchy (1993)
- Oxfordshire (1996)
- The Archaeology of Power (2001)
- Traditional Buildings in the Oxford Region c.1300–1840 (2013)

Steane also exhibited watercolours and drawings. Steane was a Fellow of the Society of Antiquaries and a member of the Institute of Field Archaeologists.

== Personal life and death ==
John Steane was married to the painter Nina Carroll (1932–1990) and they had three children together. He died on 12 April 2024, at the age of 92.
