= Adeline Blancquaert =

Belgian politician

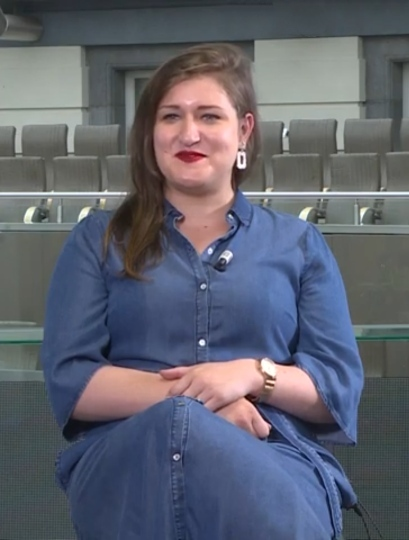

Member of the Flemish Parliament
- Incumbent
- Assumed office 26 May 2019

Member of the Senate
- Incumbent
- Assumed office 26 May 2019

Personal details
- Born: 24 May 1996 (age 30) Ghent, Belgium
- Party: Vlaams Belang
- Education: University of Ghent

Adeline Blancquaert (born 24 May 1996) is a Belgian-Flemish politician for Vlaams Belang who has been a member of the Flemish Parliament since 2019.

Blancquaert studied languages as the University of Ghent became involved Vlaams Belang Jongeren as a student. In the Belgian elections of 26 May 2019, she was elected to the Flemish Parliament for Vlaams Belang representing the East Flanders electoral district. She was also delegated by her party to the Senate as state senator.
