= Eva Ryde =

Belgian politician

Member of the Flemish Parliament
- Incumbent
- Assumed office 9 June 2024

Personal details
- Born: 9 October 1984 (age 41) Ypres, Belgium
- Party: New Flemish Alliance

Eva Ryde (born 9 October 1984 in Ypres) is a Belgian politician of the New Flemish Alliance party and a Member of the Flemish Parliament representing the West Flanders constituency.

== Biography ==
Ryde is the daughter of magistrate and former Volksunie member of parliament Michel Ryde who was elected as a municipal councilor for the N-VA alongside his daughter in Ypres in 2018. Ryde graduated with a degree in pedagogy from Ghent University and is a social worker.

She has been an alderman of Ypres since January 2013: from 2013 to 2018 she was responsible for education, youth, family, library and animal welfare and since 2019 she has been responsible for welfare, seniors, education and finance. During the 2024 Belgian regional elections she was elected to the Flemish Parliament.
