= Jan Laeremans =

Belgian-Flemish politician

Member of the Flemish Parliament
- Incumbent
- Assumed office 2019

Personal details
- Born: 23 May 1962 (age 64) Deinze, Belgium
- Party: Vlaams Belang
- Education: Catholic University of Leuven

Jan Laeremans (born 23 May 1962) is a Belgian-Flemish politician for Vlaams Belang and a member of the Flemish parliament.

Laeremans is the grandson of People's Union Senator Leo Wouters. He studied Germanic philology at the Catholic University of Leuven where he became a member of Vlaams Blok and then worked as a high school languages teacher. Laeremans became a provincial councilor Flemish Brabant in 1991 for Vlaams Blok and later Vlaams Belang. He held this role until 2019 when he was elected to the Flemish parliament.
