= Hogeschool West-Vlaanderen =

University of applied sciences in West Flanders, Belgium

Howest
- Hogeschool West-Vlaanderen
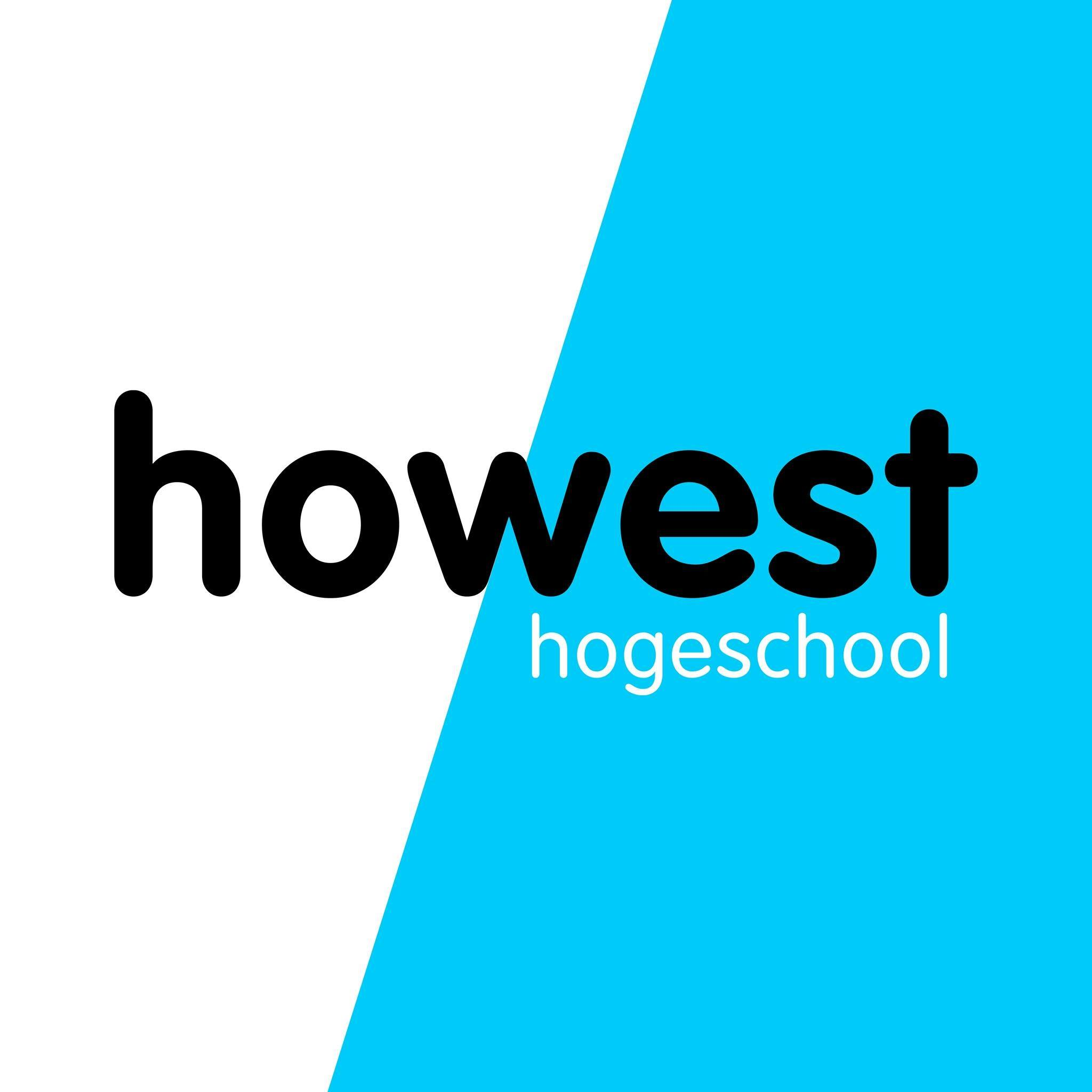
- Type: University of applied sciences
- Established: 1995
- Affiliations: Ghent University Association, RUN-EU
- Managing director: Frederik D'hulster
- Students: c. 12,000 (2025–26)
- Location: Kortrijk, Belgium
- Campus: Kortrijk, Bruges, Oudenaarde
- Website: www.howest.be/en

Hogeschool West-Vlaanderen, usually shortened to Howest, is a university of applied sciences in Belgium. It has campuses in Kortrijk, Bruges and Oudenaarde, and its administrative seat is in Kortrijk. Howest opened the 2025–26 academic year with about 12,000 students, the highest number in its history, and employs roughly 1,000 staff.

The institution was formed in 1995 by merging six colleges in West Flanders. It belongs to the Ghent University Association and, since January 2024, to the Regional University Network – European University (RUN-EU). Its Digital Arts and Entertainment programme in Kortrijk, which trains students for the games and film industries, has been ranked several times among the leading game development schools worldwide.

== History ==
Six West Flemish colleges merged in 1995 to form Howest: the Hoger Pedagogisch Instituut (the Normaalschool) and the Instituut Simon Stevin in Bruges, HIEPSO and the Provinciale Industriële Hogeschool (PIH) in Kortrijk, the Vesaliusinstituut in Ostend, and the Hoger Instituut voor Sociale Studies (HISS) in De Haan, Belgium. About 2,800 students were enrolled at the time.

Roland Vermeesch, then director of HIEPSO, became the first managing director, with Jos Monballyu of KULAK as chairman of the board. In practice the merged school kept working as five separate departments, each with its own head, departmental council and negotiating committee.

The De Haan campus closed in 1999, and social work moved to Ostend. Vermeesch died unexpectedly in 2006, and Lucien Bollaert took over his duties on an interim basis.

Lode De Geyter, until then head of the PIH department, became managing director in 2007; Jan Durnez was appointed chairman of the board. De Geyter reorganised the school's structure over the following years. Applied psychology moved from Ostend to Bruges in 2007 and social work and nursing followed in 2008, after which the Ostend campus was given up. In 2010 the departments were abolished altogether and replaced by two units, one for the Bruges programmes and one for the Kortrijk programmes, supported by shared central services.

Under a Flemish decree, the academic-level programmes inherited from the Provinciale Industriële Hogeschool were transferred to Ghent University in 2013.

Frederik D'hulster, previously director of education and internationalisation, took over as managing director in October 2023. De Geyter moved to the chairmanship of the board. Howest celebrated its thirtieth anniversary in 2025.

== Organisation ==
A managing director leads the institution, working with a board of directors, a supervisory board and a steering committee. Programmes with related content or shared staff are grouped into clusters under a programme manager, appointed for a renewable four-year term. Students are represented through a student council and a student services council, and each programme has its own student participation committee.

== Campuses ==
Howest teaches at three locations: Kortrijk, Bruges and Oudenaarde. Bachelor's programmes run in Kortrijk and Bruges. Kortrijk is the larger of the two, with some 4,500 students in 2025–26.

The Bruges site was substantially rebuilt in the early 2020s. Campus Brugge Station, next to the city's railway station, was opened in September 2024 and combines a seven-storey new building with renovated former Proximus offices; it was designed for close to 6,500 students and cost over €40 million.

== Programmes ==
Bachelor's programmes at Howest follow a 180-ECTS track over three years. Nursing is the exception, at 240 credits over four years. Associate degrees (graduaatsopleidingen) take two years and are built around placements and practical work. Teaching is in Dutch, apart from Digital Arts and Entertainment and a small number of English-taught exchange semesters and advanced bachelor's programmes.

As of 2025 the school listed 30 bachelor's programmes and 13 associate degrees, twelve of which it describes as unique within Flanders. They cover architecture and construction, business, health care, media and communication, education, product design, digital design and the arts, sport, tourism, and technology and IT.

=== Bachelor's programmes ===
- Applied Architecture (Toegepaste Architectuur)
- Applied Computer Science (Toegepaste Informatica)
- Applied Health Sciences (Toegepaste Gezondheidswetenschappen)
- Applied Psychology (Toegepaste Psychologie)
- Biomedical Laboratory Technology (Biomedische Laboratoriumtechnologie)
- Built Environment
- Business Management (Bedrijfsmanagement)
- Child and Youth Studies (Sociale Readaptatiewetenschappen)
- Communication (Communicatie)
- Creative Technologies & Artificial Intelligence
- Cybersecurity
- Digital Arts and Entertainment (DAE)
- Digital Design & Development (Devine)
- Human Resources Management
- Idea & Innovation Management
- Industrial Product Design (Industrieel Productontwerpen)
- Journalism (Journalistiek), with an optional track in sports journalism
- Multimedia and Creative Technology (MCT)
- Nursing (Verpleegkunde)
- Occupational Therapy (Ergotherapie)
- Social Work (Sociaal Werk)
- Sport and Movement (Sport en Bewegen)
- Tourism & Recreation Management (Toerisme & Recreatiemanagement)
- Teacher training for pre-school, primary and secondary education, each also offered as a shortened track

Two advanced bachelor's programmes (bachelor-na-bachelor) are also offered: Bioinformatics, taught in English, and Sustainable Energy Management.

=== Associate degrees ===
- Accounting Administration
- Construction Drawing (Bouwkundig Tekenen)
- Digital Design (Digitale Vormgeving)
- HR Support
- Internet of Things
- Marketing and Communication Support
- Orthopedagogical Support (Orthopedagogische Begeleiding)
- Programming (Programmeren)
- Secondary Education (Secundair Onderwijs)
- Social Work (Maatschappelijk Werk)
- Systems and Network Administration (Systeem- en Netwerkbeheer)
- Transport & Logistics
- Travel Support

Associate degrees have grown quickly. Enrolment in Kortrijk rose by about 40 per cent in 2025–26, with Orthopedagogical Support and Travel Support among the fastest-growing.

=== Digital Arts and Entertainment ===
Digital Arts and Entertainment (DAE) is a three-year bachelor's programme at the Kortrijk campus, taught in Dutch and in English. It covers content creation for games and film. Students pick one of six majors at the start: Game Development, Game Graphics Production, Independent Game Production, Game Sound Integration, 3D Animation Production, or Visual Effects. Most course units combine one or two hours of theory with four to six hours of practical work, and the final semester is an eighteen-week internship.

Since the 2024–25 academic year, graduates have been able to continue with a one-year master's programme in Game Technology, taught in Kortrijk in partnership with Breda University of Applied Sciences. Because Flemish universities of applied sciences are not permitted to award master's degrees, the qualification is conferred by the Dutch institution.

The programme marked its twentieth anniversary in 2026 with an exhibition of student work from twenty years of DAE, held from 26 to 28 June in The Level, its main teaching building on Campus Kortrijk Weide.

In the Rookies Global School Rankings, where industry professionals assess student portfolios, DAE placed first in the Best Game Design & Development School category in 2017, 2018 and 2021, and second in 2022. Howest also states that the programme appears each year in The Princeton Review's list of top undergraduate game design programmes. In 2021 DAE received the Grads in Games Educational Institution Award for the second time; the judges pointed to its collaboration with the Ghent developer Larian Studios and to newly introduced courses in 3D animation and sound design.

The programme draws a large international intake. Around 1,250 students were enrolled in 2021, some 230 of them from outside Belgium, and by 2022 close to half of the first-year cohort came from abroad. By early 2024 about 1,700 students were following the programme at the Kortrijk campus.

Alumni have gone on to work at international games and entertainment companies including Ubisoft, Rockstar Games and IO Interactive, while others have founded studios in Flanders or become involved in sector organisations such as the Flemish Games Association and Flanders Game Hub.

== Networks ==
Howest is one of four members of the Ghent University Association (AUGent), alongside Ghent University, HOGENT and the Artevelde University of Applied Sciences.

Since 1 January 2024 it has been a full member of RUN-EU, the Regional University Network – European University, which organises physical and virtual exchange between eight regional institutions in Spain, Portugal, Finland, the Netherlands, Austria, Ireland and Belgium.
