= Frédéric Erens =

Belgian politician

Chairman of Vlaams Blok Jongeren
- In office 2001–2004

Member of the Parliament of the Brussels-Capital Region
- In office 2004–2009

Municipal councilor of Brussels
- Incumbent
- Assumed office 2009

Personal details
- Born: 27 June 1968 (age 56); Ghent, Belgium
- Political party: National Front (mid 1990s); Vlaams Blok (2001-2004); Vlaams Belang (2004-present)

Frédéric Erens (born 27 June 1968 in Ghent, Belgium) is a Belgian politician affiliated to the Vlaams Belang party.

== Career ==
Erens worked as an insurance broker before entering politics. He was originally a member of the French-speaking Belgian National Front party founded by Daniel Féret. In the mid 1990s, he switched to the Flemish Vlaams Blok party and was chairman of the young wing, the Vlaams Blok Jongeren from 2001 to 2004.

From 2004 to 2009, Erens served as a member of the Parliament of the Brussels-Capital Region for Vlaams Belang (VB). From 2009 he also served as a municipal councilor in Brussels. In 2012, he became leader of the VB's local chapter in Brussels. In 2013, he filed an official complaint against the Brussels-based magazine De Brusseleir which had allowed all other Belgian parties to express their opinions in the run-up to local elections in articles, but had excluded Vlaams Belang.
