= Ilse Malfroot =

Belgian politician

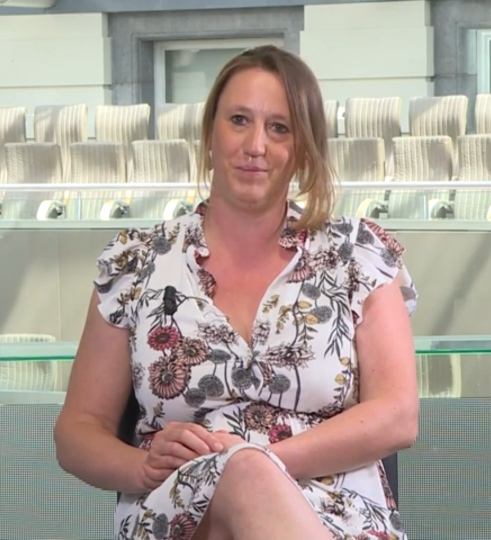

Member of the Flemish Parliament
- Incumbent
- Assumed office 2019

Personal details
- Born: 9 February 1978 (age 47); Leuven, Belgium
- Political party: Vlaams Belang

Ilse Malfroot (born 9 February 1978) is a Belgian-Flemish politician for Vlaams Belang.

Malfroot worked as a financial inspector for the Flemish government before becoming the owner and manager of a chip shop restaurant in Ninove with her husband. Since January 2013, she has been a city councilor in Ninove for Forza Ninove, the local faction of Vlaams Belang. In the Flemish elections of 26 May 2019, she was also elected to the Flemish Parliament representing East Flanders.
