= Michiel Awouters =

Belgian politician (born 1994)

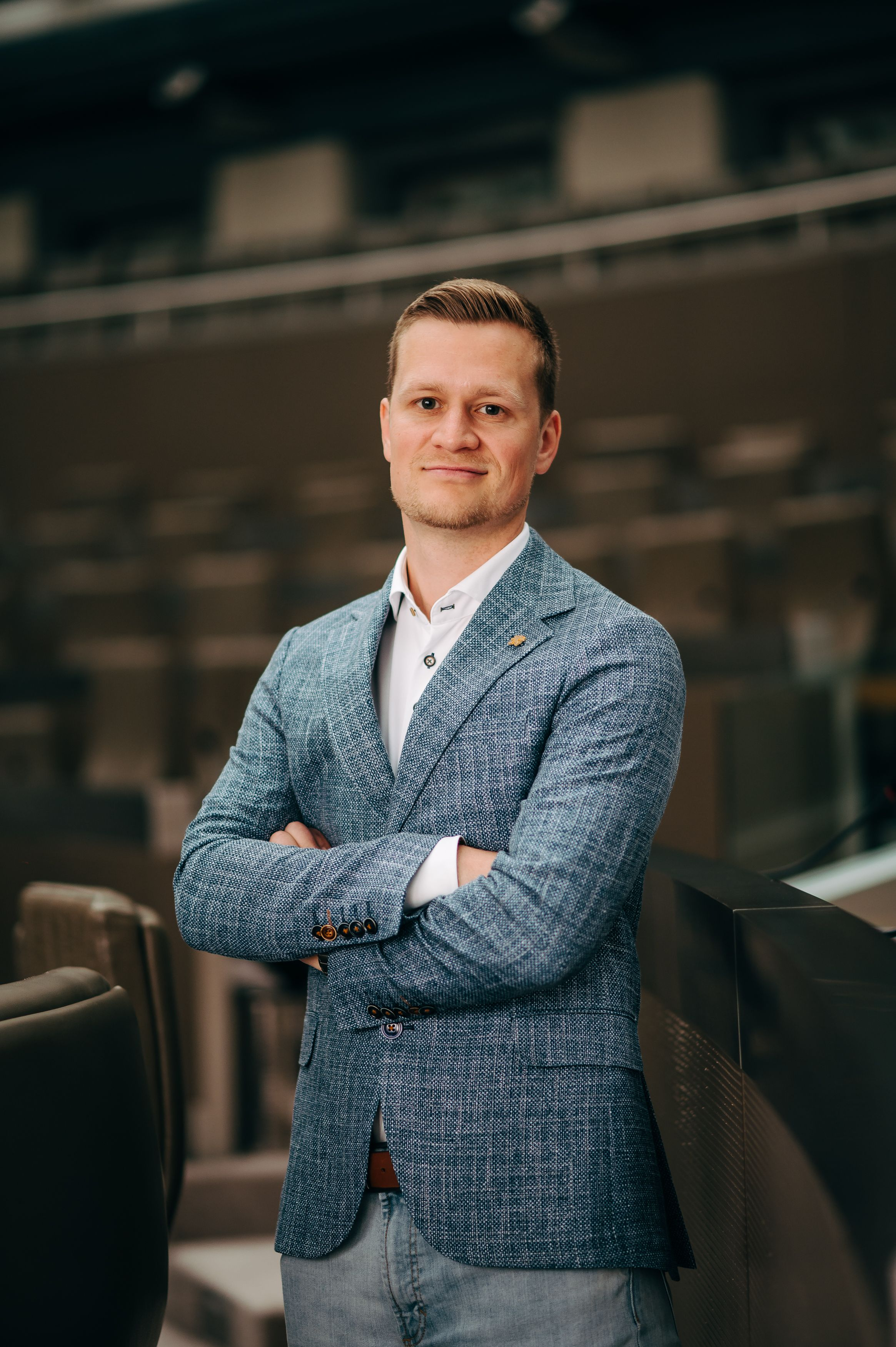
- Michiel Awouters

Member of the Flemish Parliament
- Incumbent
- Assumed office 2024

Personal details
- Born: 18 September 1994 (age 31) Neerpelt , Belgium
- Party: Vlaams Belang
- Education: Catholic University of Leuven

Michiel Awouters (born September 18, 1994) is a Belgian politician of the Flemish nationalist Vlaams Belang party who has served in the Flemish Parliament since 2024.

== Biography ==
Awouters grew up in Opglabbeek before moving to Halen. He obtained a bachelor's degree in social work at the Social College in Heverlee before completing a master's degree in international politics at the Catholic University of Leuven. Afterwards, he first worked in Lisbon and then in Belgium as a civil servant for international development and as an advisor in economics and international cooperation for the local government of Lubbeek. He then worked as a policy officer to the Vlaams Belang faction in the federal parliament for MPs Ellen Samyn and Hans Verreyt. For the 2024 Belgian regional elections, Awouters was elected to the Flemish Parliament for the Limburg constituency.
