= Nina Carroll =

British painter (1932–1990)

- Born: 20 September 1932
- Died: January 1990 (age 57); Oxfordshire
- Resting place: Wolvercote Cemetery; 51.791°N 1.273°W
- Education: Cheltenham School of Art; University of Oxford; Ruskin School of Art
- Known for: Watercolour landscapes
- Style: Watercolour painting
- Spouse: John Steane
- Children: 3
- Website: www.paintingsbyninacarroll.co.uk

Nina Carroll (20 September 1932 – January 1990) was a British painter.

== Education ==
Carroll studied art at the Cheltenham School of Art and then studied English Literature at Oxford University, where she joined the Ruskin School of Art.

== Career ==
Carroll held exhibitions in Northamptonshire, Oxfordshire, London, and elsewhere in the United Kingdom and abroad. She exhibited her work in group shows at Christie's (London), the Medici Gallery (London), New English Art Club, Royal Academy, the Royal Institute of Painters in Water Colours, the Royal Society of Portrait Painters, and the Royal West of England Academy, the Serpentine Gallery, the Victoria and Albert Museum, and other places. During 1975 to 1990, Carroll held solo exhibitions at Alfred East Art Gallery (Kettering), Bristol Art Gallery, Woodstock Museum, the Oxford Playhouse, Northampton Central Art Gallery, Banbury Museum, Devizes Museum, and Cogges Manor Farm Museum, among other places. Her work is in the collections of Balliol College, Oxford, Borough of Kettering, Green College, Oxford, Guildhall Museum (Northampton), Law Library (Oxford), Taylorian Institution (Oxford). Her works have been sold through Mallams and Sotheby's. Most of her work consists of colourful landscape watercolours.

== Personal life ==
After studying at Oxford, Carroll married John Steane, headmaster and archaeologist. They had three children together. Initially, they lived in Liverpool and then Southport. In 1964, they moved to Kettering, Northamptonshire, and in 1976 they moved to Oxfordshire.

She died of cancer at the age of 57. She is buried in Wolvercote Cemetery under her married name of "Steane" with her son, alongside other literary figures such as J.R.R. Tolkien.

== Books ==
- Adventures on the Moon, by Nina Carroll, Hutchinson's Books (London), 1947.
- Autumn Song, by Ted Hughes, illustrated by Nina Carroll, Steane (Kettering, Northamptonshire), 1971.
- Over the Wet Lawn, by Michael Standen, book jacket by Nina Carroll, Oxford University Press, 1977. ISBN 978-0192714107
- Cogges Manor Fam Museum, cover by Nina Carroll, Oxfordshire County Council, 1993.ISBN 0-9520840-0-7
- Nina Carroll's Seaside Piers, by Kate Steane, Geoff Tann, 2020. ISBN 978-1527271357
- Nina Carroll: From House to Housebooks, by Kate Steane, Geoff Tann, 2021. ISBN 978-1838489502
- Nina Carroll: Here and There, by Kate Steane, Geoff Tann, 2021. ISBN 978-1838489519
