= Dominiek Lootens-Stael =

Belgian politician

Member of the Parliament of the Brussels-Capital Region
- Incumbent
- Assumed office 2004

Member of the Flemish Parliament
- In office 1995–2004

Personal details
- Born: 4 May 1965 (age 59); Torhout, Belgium
- Political party: Vlaams Blok (1991–2004); Vlaams Belang (2004–present)

Dominiek Lootens-Stael (born 4 May 1965) is a Belgian lawyer and politician who is a member of Vlaams Belang party and a member of the Parliament of the Brussels-Capital Region.

== Life and career ==
Lootens-Stael is the son of Christian Flemish People's Union politician and mayor of Koekelare Etienne Lootens. He studied law at the Catholic University of Brussels. He was first elected to the Flemish Parliament in 1995 as a member of the Vlaams Blok party before becoming a member of its successor, Vlaams Belang until his term ended in 2004. Lootens-Stael is currently a member of the Parliament of the Brussels-Capital Region for Vlaams Belang.

== Controversies ==
In 2003, Lootens-Stael was due to visit the Welsh Assembly and the Scottish Parliament as part of a delegation of Flemish politicians, but was dropped from the delegation after he was accused of "interfering in the internal affairs of the Scottish parliament" and causing "diplomatic embarrassment" by Jean-Luc Vanraes, the chairman of the Council of the Flemish Community Commission. A number of MSPs in the Scottish Parliament, including the Scottish National Party had stated they would refuse to meet Lootens-Stael if he made the visit. The decision was criticised by fellow Vlaams Blok politician Joris Van Hauthem.

In 2017, Lootens-Stael was giving a speech in the Brussels Parliament when he was interrupted several times by sp.a politician Jef Van Damme who shouted over his speech.
