= Jonathan Holslag =

Belgian academic

Jonathan Holslag (born June 15, 1981, Sint-Niklaas) is a Belgian professor, author, policy advisor and politician.

Jonathan Holslag is a professor of international politics at the Vrije Universiteit Brussel, where he teaches diplomatic history and international politics. He also lectures on geopolitics at various defence academies in Europe and the Nato Defence College. He was invited as a guest lecturer to various universities, including the Central Party School of China, the Harvard Kennedy School, and Sciences Po, Paris.

== Research ==
His early research focused mainly on Asian security. It resulted in books and academic articles about China's relations with Africa and the tensions between China and India. In his "China's roads to influence," he anticipated China's pursuit of influence through a new "Silk Road". Straits Times, a Singaporean newspaper, and Economic Observer, a Chinese newspaper, called him one of Europe's leading Asia experts.

Later on, his focus broadened, leading to new books, like "A political history of the world", a book that was covered by BBC World, Sky News and Channel Four, with Holslag claiming that turbulence and nationalism are part of the "normal state of world politics".

Prominent in his work is the call for more realism among European countries in approaching world politics and the Asian powers like China. "Power politics is not about giving up on European values and ideals, but about preserving and gaining power to maintain those values and principles.” He explained: "I am not sure European countries are playing their national interests. They are departing from very opportunistic, short-sighted interests, not from what basically is for this generation of citizens and the next one. It is sham power politics. In fact they are selling out the future of their own citizens."

== Functions ==
Since 2015, Jonathan was a special adviser to the First Vice-President of the European Commission, until he resigned in 2020. He also was a visiting fellow at the Nobel Institute, a Rockefeller Fellow and Benelux Secretary of the Trilateral Commission.

Jonathan Holslag serves as a reserve officer in the Belgian Armed Forces.

== Selected publications ==
- Macht of mythe: achter de schermen van het Chinese groeimirakel (Power or Myth? Behind the Screens of the Chinese Growth Miracle) (2006)
- China and India: Prospects for Peace (2009)
- Trapped giant: China's troubled military rise Routledge (2010) ISBN 0415669898
- De kracht van het paradijs – hoe Europa kan overleven in de Aziatische eeuw (2013)
- The Power of Paradise: How Europe can survive in the Asian century (english translation of De kracht van het paradijs) (2015)
- China's Coming War with Asia (2015)
- A Political History of the World, Pelican (2018) ISBN 0241352045.
