= Maurits Vande Reyde =

Belgian politician

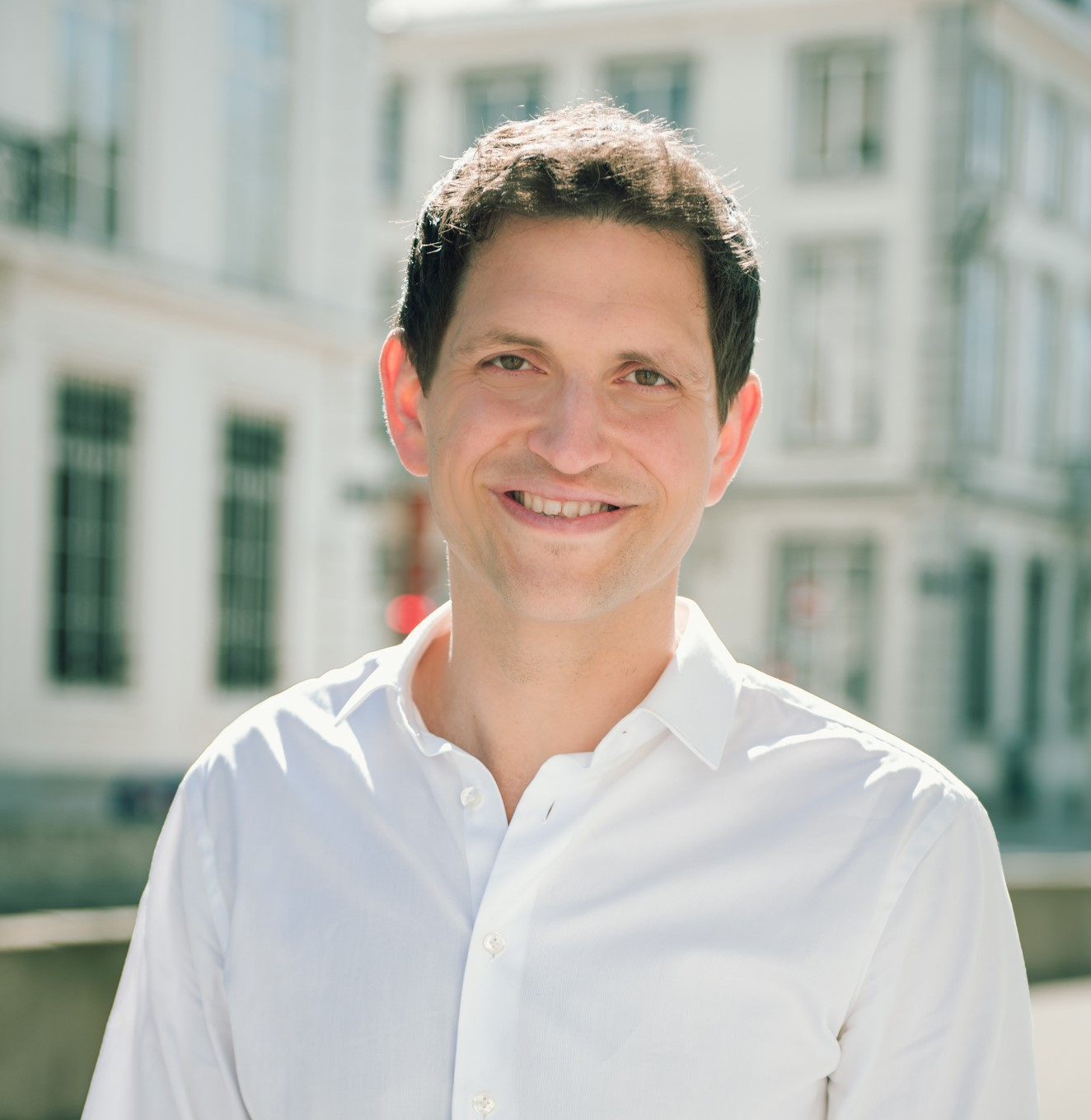
- Vande Reyde in 2023

Member of the Flemish Parliament
- Incumbent
- Assumed office 26 May 2019

Personal details
- Born: 10 July 1985 (age 40) Leuven, Belgium
- Party: Independent (since 2025); Open VLD (2009–2025)
- Other party: Project Durf
- Education: KU Leuven
- Website: Parliamentary Website

Maurits Vande Reyde (born 10 July 1985) is a Belgian politician and member of the Flemish Parliament since 2019.

He was previously a member of the Open VLD (which later changed its name to Anders) until he left the party in 2025. Since then, he has served as an independent politician on the Flemish regional level.

== Early life and education ==
Born on 10 July 1985 in Leuven, Vande Reyde studied at the Catholic University of Leuven, where he obtained a master's degree in Applied Economic Sciences in 2008.

== Political career ==
Vande Reyde joined the VLD and became an intern-coworker of Dirk Sterckx MEP in 2009. From 2012 to 2014, he worked as a budgettary advisor to the Open VLD fraction in the Flemish Parliament, from 2012 to 2013 as an advisor to federal parliament member Gwendolyn Rutten and from 2014 to 2015 as an advisor in the cabinet of Annemie Turtelboom, a former Flemish Minister of Finance and Budget.

From 7 October 2015 to 4 December 2017, Vande Reyde served as the chairman of Jong VLD, the youth wing of the Open VLD.

In the 2018 Belgian local elections, Vande Reyde ran on the local liberal Open Diest list and was elected as a local councillor for Diest, a position he still has.

In the 2019 Belgian regional elections, Vande Reyde was elected to the Flemish Parliament as a member of Open VLD and took office on 26 May 2019. He mostly focused on economics, technology, handicapped people and the core issues of government. He was re-elected in the 2024 Belgian regional elections.

=== Exit from Open VLD ===
In June 2024, Vande Reyde announced his candidacy for the leadership of Open VLD, running on a platform for smaller government. The results of the first round of the party elections on 17 August 2024 showed that Vande Reyde won 19,3% of the vote, making him third and making him unable to go to the second round.

In April 2025, Vande Reyde announced he would exit his party, calling it "too left-wing" and too similar to the Dutch progressive party D66. He stated he had wanted his party to go in a more radical, right-liberal direction, with more emphasis on shrinking the state, but that the VLD's political leadership had not wanted to push for these priorities enough.

He launched the political action group Durf on 4 September 2025.

== Political views ==
Across most of his career at the VLD, Vande Reyde was often considered to be one of the party's more right-leaning members, placing less emphasis on the more socially liberal, progressive elements that the party establishment had embraced and instead prioritizing classical liberal ideals, such as a radical push for a smaller government, fiscal conservatism, less taxes, less regulation, less bureaucracy and more entrepreneurship. He has often criticized the ways that mainstream Belgian politics and governments have handled taxation, budget deficits and granting subsidies to lobbies.

He is opposed to the inheritance tax and voted for abolishing financial benefits for purchasing zero-emission vehicles on 6 November 2024, a policy that was implemented by his former party colleague and former Flemish Minister Lydia Peeters. The rest of his party opposed removing the law.

On migration and cultural integration policy, he has lamented how the media (according to him) generalise younger people with a foreign background solely as "youth", saying that the media must call out problems by their names.

After the 2026 United States intervention in Venezuela, Vande Reyde called out members of the far-left Belgian Workers' Party for their criticism of the removal of Nicolás Maduro and added: "Everytime a far-left maniac is removed from power, that's a good thing."
