= Wim Verheyden =

Belgian-Flemish politician

Wim Verheyden (born Bornem, 9 May 1967) is a Belgian-Flemish politician who has been a member of the Flemish Parliament since 2019 for the Vlaams Belang party.

Verheyden worked for the pharmaceuticals company Pfizer as a laboratory technician. He became politically active for the Vlaams Belang and has been a municipal councilor of Bornem for VB since 2007. He was also provincial councilor of Antwerp from 2018 to 2019. In the elections of 26 May 2019 Verheyden was elected to the Flemish Parliament for the Antwerp constituency.
