= Hannes Anaf =

Belgian politician

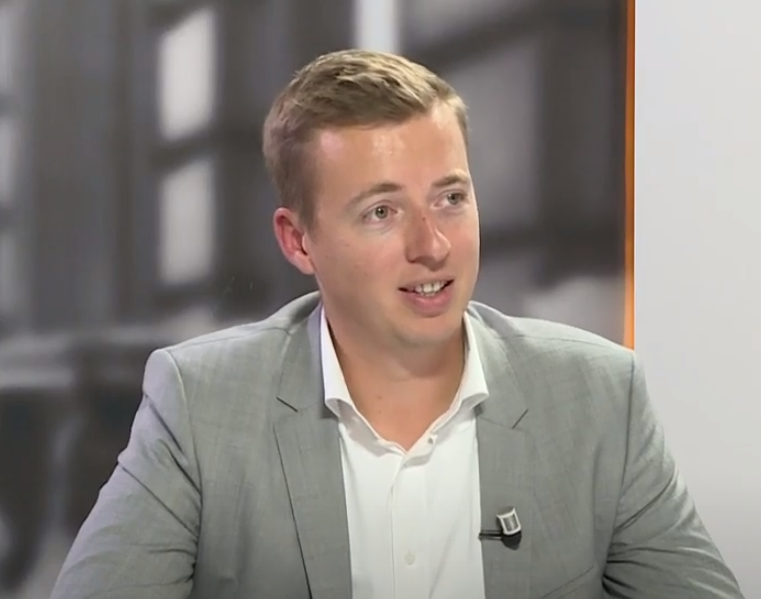
- Anaf in 2019

Mayor of Turnhout
- Incumbent
- Assumed office 2 December 2024
- Preceded by: Paul Van Miert

Member of the Flemish Parliament
- Incumbent
- Assumed office 26 May 2019

Municipal Councilor of Turnhout
- Incumbent
- Assumed office January 2007

Personal details
- Born: 4 March 1985 (age 41) Turnhout, Belgium
- Party: Vooruit
- Education: KU Leuven

Hannes Anaf (born 4 March 1985) is a Belgian politician who has served as mayor of Turnhout since 2024. A member of Vooruit, he has also served as a member of the Flemish Parliament since 2019 and as municipal councillor of Turnhout since 2007.

== Biography ==
Hannes Anaf was born on 4 March 1985. He studied Political science in 2007 and gained a master's degree in Management in 2011 at the KU Leuven.

He became a municipal councilor of Turnhout in January 2007 and served as a local alderman for Youth, Sport, Environment, Energy, Reliability and Strategic Planning from January 2013 to December 2018. He later served as local alderman for Youth, Daycare, Sport, Prevention, Neighborhoods, Communication and Libraries until June 2019.

He was elected as a member of the Flemish parliament in the 2019 Belgian regional elections. He ran again on the second place in the Vooruit (political party) list and was re-elected in the 2024 Belgian regional elections. Anaf ran as the leader of Vooruit Turnhout in the 2024 Belgian local elections, in which his party won first place. His party then formed a local government with the New Flemish Alliance-Christian Democratic and Flemish cartel coalition and he was sworn in as mayor on 2 December 2024.

Anaf (left) standing next to his political colleagues, greeting marathonrunners in October 2024.
