= Kristof Slagmulder =

Belgian politician

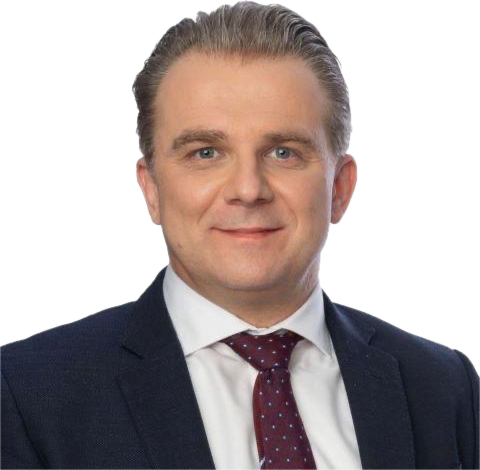

Member of the Flemish Parliament
- Incumbent
- Assumed office 2019

Personal details
- Born: 21 September 1979 (age 46) Aalst, Belgium
- Party: Vlaams Belang

Kristof Slagmulder (born 1979) is a Flemish politician for the Vlaams Belang party and a member of the Flemish Parliament since 2019. From 2003 to 2004, Slagmulder was an administrative assistant and from 2004 to 2007 a vacancy consultant at the VDAB. From 2007 to 2014 he was editor-in-chief of Uitgeverij Egmont, which is affiliated with Vlaams Belang, from 2010 to 2014 an employee of European Parliamentarian Philip Claeys and from 2014 to 2019 provincial coordinator of the VB department in East Flanders.[1]

Since January 2001 he has also been a member of the municipal council of Denderleeuw. From 2006 to 2019 he was also a member of the police council of the municipality.

In January 2013, Vlaams Belang in Denderleeuw played an important role in the coalition formation. The socialist party (sp.a) was referred to the opposition benches by secret ballot. As a result, a center-right majority was formed by N-VA, CD&V and Open Vld. During the ungovernability, caused by sp.a and CD&V, Vlaams Belang provided tolerance support to the council of aldermen, so that policy decisions could still be taken. Because the cordon sanitaire against the VB was almost broken, Denderleeuw was in the national news several times.

Kristof Slagmulder was threatened in September 2016 by a Turkish ex-soldier, who posed with army weapons on the social networking site Facebook. In 2017, he organized a demonstration against senseless violence following a number of robberies against civilians in the station area of Denderleeuw.

In October 2018, the local Vlaams Belang branch obtained 26.2% of the vote following municipal elections, making it the largest party in Denderleeuw. The party rose from three to nine seats, but was not included in the governing majority. After the municipal elections, he and a few volunteers set up 'Vlaams Solidair Denderleeuw', an organization that distributes food parcels to Flemish people living in poverty. Slagmulder was discussed in a Pano report on Canvas about the success of Vlaams Belang in the Dender region.

In the Flemish elections of 26 May 2019, he was also elected a member of the Flemish Parliament for the East Flanders electoral district with 12,675 preference votes. He sits on the Education Committee, the Housing and Heritage Committee, the Deradicalization Committee and the Foreign Policy, European Affairs, International Cooperation and Tourism Committee. In the Flemish Parliament, he focuses on matters related to education and truancy.

In the Flemish elections of June 9, 2024, Slagmulder was re-elected. He then took a seat in the Committee on Foreign Policy, European Affairs, International Cooperation, and the Committee on Economy, Employment, Social Affairs, Science, and Innovation, where he became the second vice-chair. He also became a member of the Interparliamentary Committee for the Dutch Language Union (Taalunie).

In the local elections of October 2024, Vlaams Belang once again became the largest party in Denderleeuw with 38.3% of the votes, but the party was once again excluded from the majority.

Since December 2024, Slagmulder has served as a regional senator in the Senate and was delegated to the Interparliamentary Assembly of the Organization for Security and Cooperation in Europe (OSCE).

In 2025, his book ‘Vlaamse voetsporen in Zuid-Afrika’ (ISBN 9789078898696) was published by Uitgeverij Egmont.
