= Paul Van Miert =

Belgian politician

- Van Miert in 2026

Mayor of Turnhout
- In office 1 January 2019 – 2 December 2024
- Preceded by: Eric Vos
- Succeeded by: Hannes Anaf

Member of the Flemish Parliament
- Incumbent
- Assumed office 2004

Municipal councilor of Antwerp
- In office 2007–2011

Personal details
- Born: 5 March 1965 (age 61) Turnhout, Belgium
- Party: N-VA

Paul Van Miert (born May 3, 1965, in Turnhout) is a Belgian politician for the N-VA party and a member of the Flemish Parliament.

== Biography ==
Van Miert was born in 1965. He is a cousin of the former sp.a politician Karel Van Miert. He obtained a bachelor's degree in marketing at the Katholieke Hogeschool Kempen. He worked for the Miko NV Belgian coffee company in several locations before leading the German subsidiary until 2014.

In 2006 Van Miert became a member of the district board as well as of the national party council of N-VA. He ran for the first time in the 2006 municipal elections in the municipality of Oud-Turnhout. He was elected as a councilor for the cartel of CD&V and N-VA. In the 2012 municipal elections, he was re-elected as a councilor. His party became the largest faction in the city council with nine seats, but ended up in opposition after CD&V concluded an administrative agreement with sp.a and Groen!. In the 2014 Belgian regional elections he was elected to the Flemish Parliament for the Antwerp constituency. In the Flemish elections of 2019, he was re-elected from sixth place on the Antwerp N-VA list. In the Flemish Parliament, Van Miert was chairman of the committee for General Policy, Finance and Budget from 2016 to 2019.
