= Chris Janssens (politician) =

Belgian politician

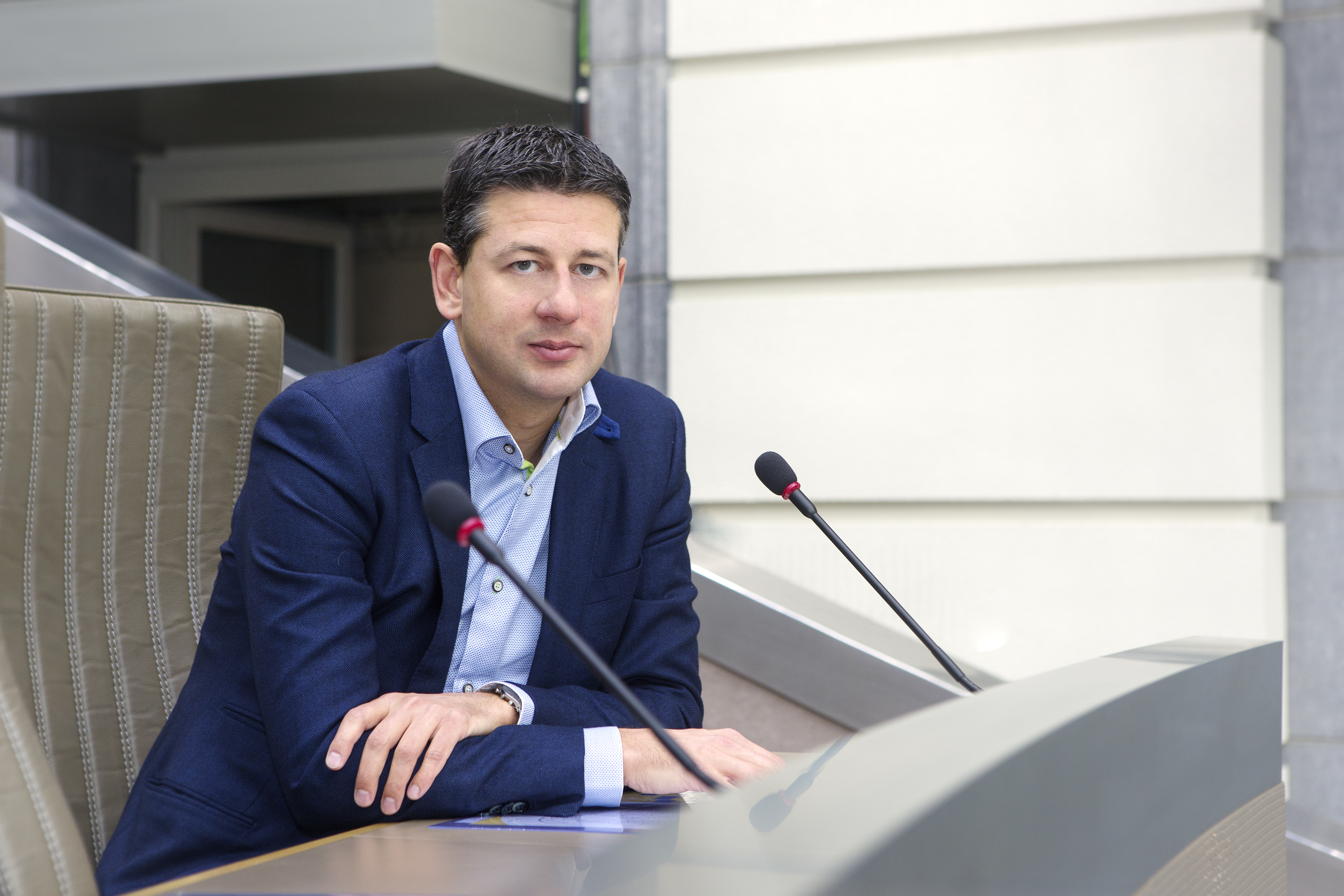

Member of the Flemish Parliament
- Incumbent
- Assumed office 2009

Chairman of Vlaams Belang in the Flemish Parliament
- Incumbent
- Assumed office 2014

Personal details
- Born: Chris Janssens; 8 November 1977 (age 48) Genk, Belgium
- Party: Vlaams Belang

Chris Janssens (born 8 November 1977 in Genk) is a Flemish politician for Vlaams Belang, a member of the Flemish Parliament and the current chairman of the VB's faction in the Flemish Parliament. He is also the spokesman for the party in the Flemish region.

== Biography ==
=== Political career ===
Janssens obtained a degree in legal practice from the UC Leuven-Limburg before completing a conversion degree in business translation at the Katholieke Universiteit Leuven. He then worked as a notary public officer prior to entering politics. He first joined the former Vlaams Blok party when he was a teenager, citing concerns with social integration and multiculturalism which he argued had caused divides and harmed Flemish identity. Janssens was first elected as a representative for the Vlaams Belang party to the Flemish parliament in 2009 for the Limburg constituency, and was re-elected in 2014 and 2019. He serves as the VB's floor leader in the Flemish Parliament and its main spokesman for the Flemish region. Janssens has also been a city councilor in Genk since 2007.

Politically, Janssens has been described as part of the more moderate salonfähige wing of the party which supports moderation to end the cordon placed on the VB by other Belgian parties. He has also claimed to have rejected offers to defect to the N-VA party due to being seen as one of the VB's popular and less radical politicians.

In November 2020, Janssens received death threats on social media for calling for an end to Turkish funding of mosques in Belgium. At the same time, fellow Genk based Flemish politician and New Flemish Alliance member Zuhal Demir also received threats via email for making similar statements. Janssens subsequently filed a complaint with the police.

=== Personal life ===
Janssens came out as gay in a 2021 interview with Het Belang van Limburg making him the first openly gay representative of the Vlaams Belang party. He acknowledged that members of the party had historically made anti-LGBT statements but denied the VB was homophobic and has since evolved on LGBT rights. VB leader Tom Van Grieken wrote in support of Janssens.
