= Griet Vanryckegem =

Belgian politician

Member of the Flemish Parliament
- Incumbent
- Assumed office 9 June 2024

Personal details
- Born: 16 December 1973 (age 52) Menen, Belgium
- Party: New Flemish Alliance

Griet Vanryckegem (born 16 December 1973 in Menen) is a Belgian politician of the New Flemish Alliance party and a Member of the Flemish Parliament representing the West Flanders constituency.

== Biography ==
Vanryckegem was a Dutch and history teacher at the Sint-Aloysiuscollege school in Menen from 1996 to 2024. She first became active in politics in 2012 in the Menen chapter of the N-VA and was elected as a municipal councilor for the party that year where she focused on matters related to education, heritage and libraries. In the 2024 Belgian regional elections she was elected to the Flemish Parliament.
