= Suzy Wouters =

Belgian politician

Suzy Wouters (born 5 March 1968 in Leuven) is a Belgian-Flemish nationalist politician for Vlaams Belang.

Since January 2019, she has been a councilor in Scherpenheuvel-Zichem for the Vlaams Belang. A few months later, in the Flemish elections of 26 May 2019, she also became a member of the Flemish Parliament for the Flemish Brabant electoral district.
