= Tom Seurs =

Member of the Flemish Parliament
- Incumbent
- Assumed office 9 June 2024

Personal details
- Born: 15 November 1988 (age 37) Genk, Belgium
- Party: New Flemish Alliance

Tom Seurs (born 10 February 1978 in Genk) is a Belgian politician of the New Flemish Alliance party who has served as a Member of the Flemish Parliament since 2024 for the Limburg constituency.

== Biography ==
Seurs attended school in Genk and obtained a master's degree in graphic arts from the Sint-Lucas School of Architecture in 2001. He worked as a graphic designer at various advertising agencies in Limburg and then from 2010 to 2024 was a media studies teacher in Hasselt.

He became involved in local politics in As and in 2000 was elected as a municipal councilor for the localist Lijst Truyen and Voluit! party list. From 2001 to 2016 he focused on matters related to youth, education, spatial planning and urban design on the council. He later joined the N-VA and was re-elected to the council as an N-VA representative. In 2016, he became mayor of As. During the 2024 Belgian regional elections, he was elected to the Flemish Parliament for Limburg.
