= Leo Pieters =

Belgian politician

Member of the Flemish parliament
- Incumbent
- Assumed office 2019

Senate
- Incumbent
- Assumed office 2019

Personal details
- Born: Leo Pieters; 1 May 1962 (age 62); Maaseik, Belgium
- Political party: Vlaams Belang

Leo Pieters (born 1 May 1962) is a Belgian politician for Vlaams Belang.

Pieters has been a municipal councilor for Vlaams Belang in Maaseik since 2004 and was also a provincial councilor of Limburg from 2018 to 2019. In 2019, he was elected to the Flemish Parliament where he sits on the committees of education and housing. Following the election, he was designated by his party to sit in the Belgian senate.
