= Steene =

Steene Stene
- Commune
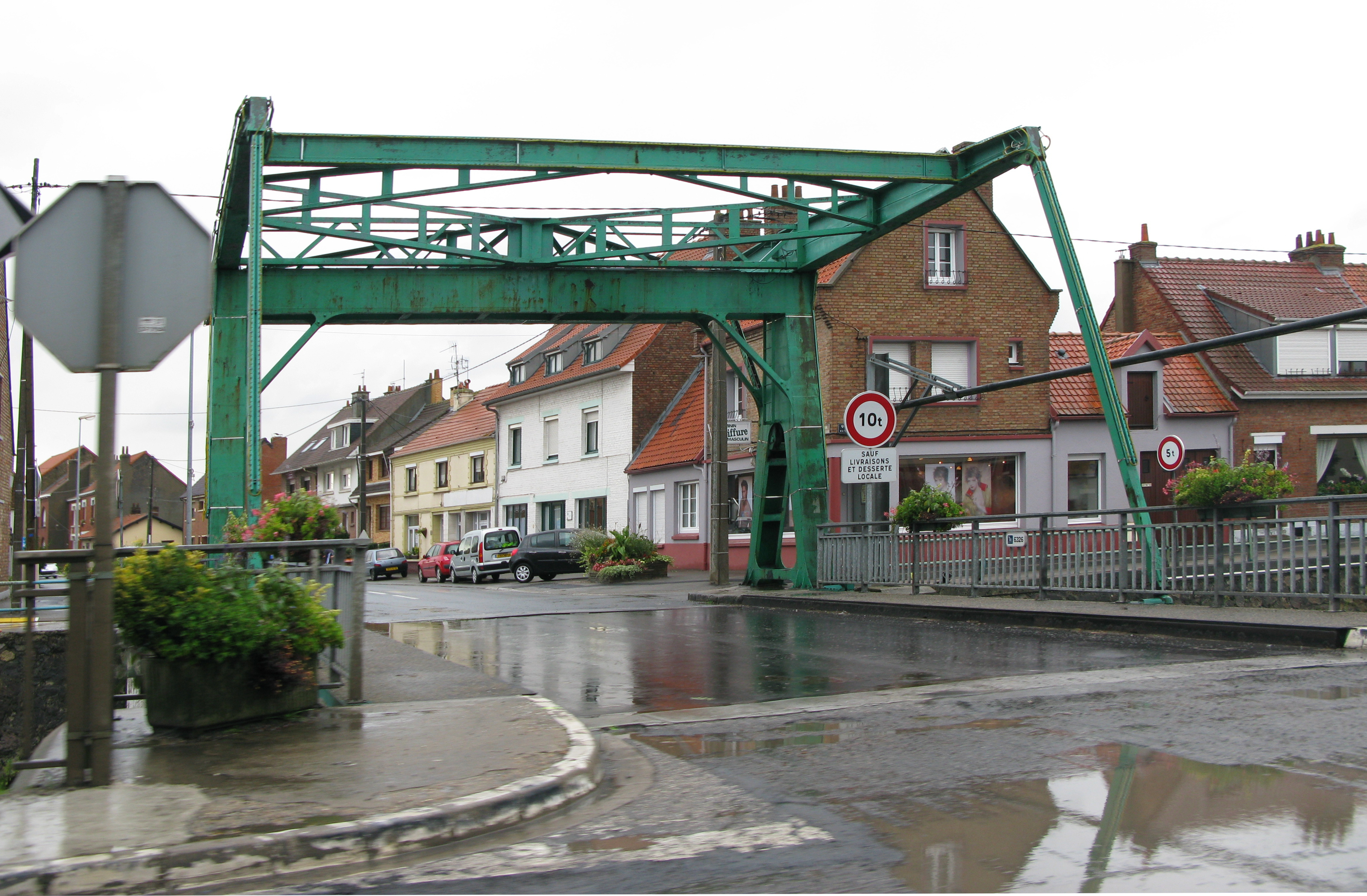
- The lifting bridge in Grand-Millebrugghe

- Coat of arms
- Location of Steene
- Location within France Location within Hauts-de-France
- Coordinates: 50°57′13″N 2°22′05″E
- Country: France
- Region: Hauts-de-France
- Department: Nord
- Arrondissement: Dunkerque
- Canton: Coudekerque-Branche
- Intercommunality: CC Hauts de Flandre

Government
  - Mayor (2020–2026): Alain Davroux
- Area^{1}: 10.28 km^{2} (3.97 sq mi)
- Elevation: 5 m (16 ft)
- Highest elevation: 28 m (92 ft)
- Lowest elevation: 0 m (0 ft)
- Population (2023): 1,405
  - Density: 136.7/km^{2} (354.0/sq mi)
- Demonym: Steenois (es)
- Time zone: UTC+01:00 (CET)
  - Summer (DST): UTC+02:00 (CEST)
- INSEE/Postal code: 59579 /59380
- ^{1} French Land Register data, which excludes lakes, ponds, glaciers > 1 km^{2} (0.386 sq mi or 247 acres) and river estuaries.

Steene (French pronunciation: [stɛn]; from Flemish; Stene in modern Dutch spelling) is a commune in the Nord department in northern France.

== Heraldry ==
Arms of Steene	The arms of Steene are blazoned : Or, a chevron gules between 3 ermine spots sable.

== See also ==
- Communes of the Nord department
