= Els Sterckx =

Belgian politician

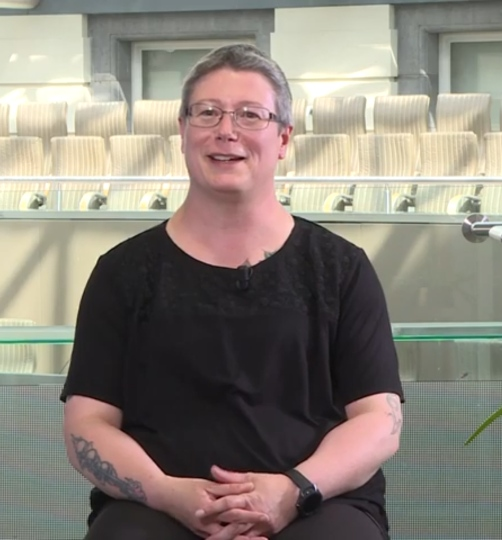
Els Sterckx, 2019

Els Sterckx (born Herentals, 31 January 1972) is a Belgian-Flemish politician of the Vlaams Belang party and a member of the Flemish Parliament.

Stereckx served in the Belgian army before training as an ambulance driver with the Royal School Medical Service. She has been a councilor in Wuytsbergen and is the group leader for Vlaams Belang in Herentals municipal council. She has been a member of the Flemish Parliament since 2019, representing the Antwerp region. In the Flemish Parliament, she focuses on matters related to animal welfare.
