= Vlaams Belang =

Flemish political party

Flemish Interest Vlaams Belang
- Abbreviation: VB
- Leader: Tom Van Grieken
- Founded: 14 November 2004; 22 years ago
- Preceded by: Vlaams Blok
- Headquarters: Hertogstraat 69; 1000 Brussels
- Youth wing: Vlaams Belang Jongeren
- Membership (2021): ▲22,194
- Ideology: Flemish nationalism; Right-wing populism; Euroscepticism
- Political position: Right-wing to far-right
- Regional affiliation: None
- European affiliation: Patriots.eu
- European Parliament group: Patriots for Europe (since 2024) (Note: The party was formerly part of Non-Inscrits (2004–2007, 2007–2015), Identity, Tradition, Sovereignty (2007), Europe of Nations and Freedom (2015–2019), and Identity and Democracy (2019–2024).)
- Francophone counterpart: Chez Nous (2021–2025)
- Colours: Yellow; Black
- Slogan: Eerst onze mensen ('Our people first')
- Chamber of Representatives: 20 / 87 (Flemish seats)
- Senate: 7 / 35 (Flemish seats)
- Flemish Parliament: 31 / 124
- Brussels Parliament: 2 / 17 (Flemish seats)
- European Parliament: 3 / 13 (Flemish seats)
- Flemish Provincial Councils: 33 / 175
- Benelux Parliament: 2 / 21 (Belgian seats)

Website
- vlaamsbelang.org

Vlaams Belang (Dutch pronunciation: [ˈvlaːms bəˈlɑŋ]; lit. 'Flemish Interest'; VB) is a Flemish nationalist and Eurosceptic right-wing to far-right political party in the Flemish Region and Brussels Capital Region of Belgium. It is widely considered by the media and political analysts to be on the political far-right, although it has self-described as right-nationalist and more recently as conservative and centre-right and has tried to distance itself from the far-right label in recent years.

Vlaams Belang is a rebrand of Vlaams Blok, which was dissolved after it was condemned for espousing racism during a trial which was held in 2004. After it reorganized itself as Vlaams Belang, it continued to espouse the core philosophy of its predecessor by campaigning on a separatist and Flemish nationalist platform. It also supports the maintenance of Flemish cultural identity, it opposes multiculturalism, and it advocates the imposition of tougher law & order policies. However, the VB toned its rhetoric down and it also implemented some changes in the more controversial portions of the former Vlaams Blok statute and has sought to change its image from a radical to a more conservative party by distancing itself from some of its former programs. Nonetheless, most other parties initially continued the cordon sanitaire which was implemented against the former party, effectively blocking the Vlaams Belang from taking part in government at any level. Additionally, attempts on cutting public subsidies specifically for the party were made through the Belgian draining law.

Like Vlaams Blok, Vlaams Belang was initially popular among the Flemish electorate and it was also one of the most successful nationalist-populist parties in Europe. However, from 2008, the party experienced a downturn in support and membership, a situation which coincided with internal problems which existed within the party and the rise of the more moderate nationalist New Flemish Alliance, which, at the time, supported Flemish independence. Under the current leadership of Tom Van Grieken, the VB has begun to regain popular support and as a result, it made a comeback during the 2019 federal elections. Following the election, there was media speculation that the cordon sanitaire of the party could be lifted for the first time. By 2021, the VB had again grown into one of the largest parties in the Flemish region.

== History ==
=== Background: Vlaams Blok ===
The direct predecessor of the Vlaams Belang was the Vlaams Blok, which was formed by the nationalist right-wing and national conservative faction within the People's Union (Volksunie, VU) which had emerged in the late 1970s. The ideology of the Vlaams Blok started out with its radical nationalist rejection of the People's Union compromise on the Flemish autonomy issue, and later increasingly focused on immigration and security, exploitation of political scandals, and defense of traditional values. The immigration positions of the Vlaams Blok were subject to much controversy, particularly after the party released its 70-point plan, and the Vlaams Blok was forced to disband in 2004 after being found to sanctioned illegal discrimination. By then, the party was the most popular Flemish party, supported by about one in four of the Flemish electorate, and was one of the most successful parties considered to be right-wing populist in Europe as a whole.

In Belgium in 2001, Roeland Raes, the ideologue and vice-president of Vlaams Blok, gave an interview to Dutch TV where he cast doubt over the number of Jews murdered by the Nazis during the Holocaust. In the same interview he questioned the scale of the Nazis' use of gas chambers and the authenticity of Anne Frank's diary. The interview was met with uproar within the party with the VB's leadership immediately distancing themselves from Raes and holding an emergency meeting on whether to expel him. According to political scientist Cas Mudde, the Vlaams Blok had campaigned on heavy anti-immigration themes but had positioned itself against antisemitism and Holocaust denial. In response to the media assault following the interview, Raes was forced to resign his position but vowed to remain active within the party.

Upon complaints filed by the governmental Centre for Equal Opportunities and Opposition to Racism and the Dutch-speaking Human Rights League in Belgium, in 2001 three non-profit organisations that in effect constituted the core of the Vlaams Blok party were charged with violation of the Law on Racism and xenophobia by assisting "a group or organisation that clearly and repeatedly commits discrimination or segregation," here the political party. By April 2004, the Appellate Court of Ghent came to a final verdict, forbidding their and the party's continued existence for its "repeated incitement to discrimination." The trial was met with intense debate and mixed reactions, with the Vlaams Blok leadership and some political commentators arguing the trial was a politically motivated attempt by the Belgian establishment to destroy the party. In November that year, the Court of Cassation rejected their last appeal to annul the verdict; the delay had allowed using the name Vlaams Blok for election candidacy.

=== Vlaams Belang (2004–2008) ===
After the Supreme Court ruling, the leadership of the VB seized the occasion to dissolve itself, and start afresh under a new name. On 14 November, the Vlaams Blok thus disbanded itself, and the Vlaams Belang was established. Other proposed names had included the Flemish People's Party and Flemish Freedom Front. The Vlaams Belang also instituted a number of changes in its political program, carefully moderating or discarding some of the more radical positions of the former Vlaams Blok. Nevertheless, the party leader Frank Vanhecke made it clear that the party would fundamentally remain the same; "We change our name, but not our tricks. We change our name, but not our programme."

Former Vlaams Blok chairman Frank Vanhecke was chosen as chairman of the Vlaams Belang on 12 December 2004. Despite efforts to tone down parts of the party's platform, the Vlaams Belang has continued to be subjected to the cordon sanitaire like its predecessor, wherein all the traditional Flemish parties have agreed to systematically exclude the party, and never form a coalition with it. This situation was however altered slightly with the emergence of the smaller right-wing party List Dedecker (founded in 2007), which did not joined in on the agreement and argued that the cordon was ineffective. Nevertheless, in an interview with the popular weekly Humo, Flemish Prime Minister Yves Leterme for instance declared that a local chapter of his Christian Democratic and Flemish party (CD&V) that would form a coalition or close agreements with the Vlaams Belang, would no longer be considered part of the CD&V.

The VB contested the 2006 municipal elections on the theme of "Secure, Flemish, Liveable". The VB enjoyed a massive increase of votes, and its council members almost doubled, from 439 to about 800. The election result was described by the party as a "landslide victory." In Antwerp, the VB's vote count ran behind that of the Socialist Party, which increased their share of the vote dramatically. However, the VB, which was in a coalition with the minor VLOTT party, slightly increased their vote in the city to 33.5%. In the 2007 general election, the party won 17 seats in the Chamber of Representatives and five seats in the Senate, remaining more or less at status quo. Earlier the same year, the party joined the short-lived European Parliament group Identity, Tradition and Sovereignty alongside parties such as the French National Front.

=== Decline and internal strife (2008–2018) ===
In 2008, Bruno Valkeniers was chosen as new party chairman for the VB, having contested the position unopposed. In 2009, the party contested elections for the Flemish Parliament and the European Parliament. The party was reduced from 32 to 21 seats (from the Vlaams Blok's record 24%, to 15%) in the Flemish parliament, and from three to two seats in the European parliament. In the 2010 general election, the party was again reduced, to 12 seats in the Chamber, and three in the Senate. This was largely due to the great success of the more moderate new party New Flemish Alliance, which also campaigned on Flemish independence and took many of the VB's votes. Around this time, the VB also saw several high-profile members defect from or quit the party, such as former leader Frank Vanhecke. After the party suffered heavy losses during the local elections of 2012 Bruno Valkeniers stepped down as party chairman and was succeeded by Gerolf Annemans.

In the 2014 federal and regional elections, the party again suffered a big loss; it was reduced to 5.9% of the Flemish vote. The European list, pulled by Annemans, scored slightly better with 6.8%. Annemans resigned as party leader, a function he only performed for two years, and argued for a rejuvenation of the party. The following party chairman election was won by the only candidate, Tom Van Grieken, then 28 years old and at the time the youngest leader of a political party in Belgium. After assuming leadership of the party, Van Grieken sought to soften and moderate its image further.

=== Resurgence (2018–present) ===
During the 2018 Belgian local elections, the party saw a resurgence in support, obtaining 13.1% of the Flemish vote with an outlier of more than 40% in the city of Ninove where it fought locally under the name of Forza Ninove. The party also led a campaign against the Global Compact for Migration, which some commentators credit to successfully pressuring the rival N-VA to adopt a position against the Compact.

On May 26, 2019, in what was known as "Super Sunday" in Belgium (owing to the fact the Federal, Regional and European elections took place on the same day) the party made substantial gains in all three elections which some political analysts described as a significant comeback.

The party polled second place in the Flemish region with 18.6% of the overall vote, increasing its number of MPs in the Chamber of Representatives to 18 (its best result since 2007). In the Flemish Parliament the party also finished second, gaining 23 representatives. The party's campaign was managed by Bart Claes. Political analysts noted that the VB saw an increase in support among voters under 30 which was attributed to the party's use of social media campaigning.

In response to the results, there was some speculation that the N-VA leader Bart De Wever would break the Cordon sanitaire imposed on the party after he decided to hold talks with the VB as part of the coalition formation on the Flemish level, as their strong results made forming a coalition without them more difficult. The ending of the Cordon Sanitaire was further speculated after the VB leader Tom Van Grieken was invited to a customary meeting with King Philippe for the first time along with the leaders of the other main parties. The former Vlaams Blok party had previously been denied a meeting with the King in 1991 and 2003. Eventually, the party remained in opposition both at the regional and federal level, as, with the exception of N-VA, no other party was found willing to break the cordon.

During the 2024 Belgian federal election, the European and regional elections which again took place on the same day, the VB made further gains in all, including polling in first place in the Flemish electoral college for the European elections and finishing joint first in the Flemish parliament, but didn't see as many gains as initially predicted by opinion surveys in the Federal Parliament where the N-VA remained as the largest Flemish party.

In the 2024 Belgian local elections, Guy D'haeseleer became Vlaams Belang's first ever elected mayor, after the party secured an absolute majority on the Ninove municipal council. In Ranst the cordon sanitaire on the party was officially broken for the first time when two local parties Vrij Ranst and PIT, the latter of which contains CD&V members and is headed by former Open VLD mayor Lode Hofmans agreed to form a governing coalition with Vlaams Belang.

== Political positions ==
The policies of the Vlaams Belang focus mainly on the issues of Flemish independence, opposition to multiculturalism, and defence of "traditional Western values". By 2021, media commentators described the party as coming to contain two large factions: the more conservative salonfähige wing, who wish to moderate the party in order to break the cordon sanitaire by implementing a policy of de-demonizing the VB, taking inspiration from other European parties and politicians such as Marine Le Pen and the French National Rally; and a more radical and traditionalist wing who held ties to groups like the Order of Flemish Militants. The party has also been labelled by some sources as "neo-Fascist".

=== Domestic policy ===
The Vlaams Belang supports returning Brussels to the full control of Flemish region as opposed to its current state as a bilingual capital region. It also wants Dutch to be the sole official language of Flanders. The party also favours abolishing the Belgian Senate.

Although the party almost exclusively stands in the Flemish region of Belgium, it ran a list of candidates in the Walloon Brabant electoral district in 2007 as a protest against the lack of splitting between Flemish and Francophone communities in Brussels-Halle-Vilvoorde.

=== Flemish nationalism ===
The VB's main goal is to establish an independent Flemish republic. The party seeks a peaceful secession of Flanders from Belgium, citing in its program the dissolution of the Union between Sweden and Norway (1905), Czechoslovakia (1992), and the independence of Montenegro (2006) as examples that such would be possible. The reason to seek independence is given as the "enormous cultural and political differences between Flemings and Walloons," and according to the party, Belgian governments are also "paralyzed by ongoing disputes between Flemish and Walloon politicians." Other stated reasons given for secessionism are the financial transfers from Flanders to the capital of Brussels and to Wallonia (Belgium's other half), which Vlaams Belang considers to be unjustified. Members of Vlaams Belang argue that the French speaking Socialist Party de facto rules Belgium and does not represent the interests of Flemish voters. The party also calls for the exclusive use of the Dutch language in Flanders and for compulsory measures that both immigrants and Francophone residents of Flanders learn to speak Dutch. In contrast to its Vlaams Blok predecessor, the VB has downplayed and placed less emphasis on ethnonationalism in recent years when discussing Flemish national identity. Political author Hans-Georg Betz noted that the party no longer features the ethnically defined version of people ("volk") that was featured in the former Vlaams Blok "Own People First" slogan and instead uses the neutral sounding Mensen — the Dutch word for human beings in its messages.

==== Immigration and minorities ====
The Vlaams Belang official immigration policy has been slightly moderated from that of the former Vlaams Blok. After updating its platform, the party simply called for the repatriation of those immigrants who "reject, deny or combat" Flemish culture as well as certain European values, including freedom of expression and equality between men and women. In its current platform, the VB states that it supports immigrants who can assimilate into Flemish culture, but positions itself against mass immigration in Belgium, calling for tightened laws on family migration, a complete freeze on what it terms as non-essential immigration and expulsion of unemployed foreign nationals.

In 2021, Vlaams Belang called for the formation of an "Agency for Remigration".

The former Vlaams Blok was, according to political scientist Cas Mudde, only very rarely accused of anti-Semitism – and even then, it was strongly condemned by the party leadership. Accused of being anti-Muslim, the party favors the expulsion of all who opposed "Western values" and after the 2016 Brussels bombings, called for closed borders and a temporary stop to immigration. The party is also opposed to what it regards as lenient immigration policies and state multiculturalism forced on the Flemish region by the Belgian federal government and the European Union, arguing that such policies leave Flanders vulnerable to terrorism and have eroded Flemish culture. It also states that immigrants must adapt to Flemish values and culture rather than Flanders having to change to adopt the cultures of migrants, and that immigrants who cannot adapt to Flemish culture or laws should be offered incentives to voluntarily repatriate themselves. The party also supports the expulsion of illegal immigrants and foreign residents with criminal records from Flanders.

Currently, the party is seen as anti-Islam, while being strongly pro-Israel, regarding Jews and Israelis as allies against radical Islam. Filip Dewinter, for example, has stated that women wearing the hijab have "effectively signed their contract for deportation." Initially, members of Belgium's Jewish community boycotted the party due to the stigma of wartime collaborationism associated with Flemish nationalism and the fact the VB's Vlaams Blok predecessor contained founders who had collaborated with the Nazis. However, in Antwerp sections of the city's large Jewish community now actively support the party, as they feel threatened by the new wave of anti-Semitism from the growing Muslim population. The VB's list for the 2024 municipal elections in Antwerp includes a practicing Jewish candidate for the first time. In 2010, the party was part of a delegation to Israel (along with some other rightist parties), where they issued the "Jerusalem Declaration," which defended the right of Israel to exist and defend itself against terrorism. Israeli Deputy Minister Ayoob Kara in turn visited the party in Antwerp in 2011. In March 2014, a party mission headed by Dewinter visited Israel and met with Deputy Minister in the Prime Minister's Office Ofir Akunis. and Samaria Regional Council, Gershon Mesika and Yossi Dagan.

=== Social issues ===
Like its predecessor, the Vlaams Belang was initially opposed to same-sex marriage and instead advocated civil partnerships for same-sex couples. After assuming leadership, Tom Van Grieken stated that the party had dropped its campaign against gay marriage. In 2014, the party moderated its stance and changed its policy to support same-sex marriage. This more moderate stance has not been widely accepted by all party members. On abortion the party is socially conservative. According to Vlaams Belang abortion should only be possible when the woman's life is in danger, when the unborn child is not viable and in the case of rape.

==== Law and order ====
In order to secure Flemish cities, the party wants to implement a policy of zero tolerance. It supports the abolition of the Belgian parole law, which allows convicts to be released after only one third of their prison sentence has been served. The party also opposes drug liberalization. Citing "a massive overrepresentation of immigrants in crime statistics," the party also wants to deport criminal and illegal foreigners, as well as seeking to "combat Islamic terror threat."

=== Economy ===
The party's economic policy has been changed significantly from the Vlaams Blok. While the Vlaams Blok called for a rather mixed economy, the Vlaams Belang moved towards neoliberalism. However, for the 2019 federal election, the party returned to a protectionist economic program. A 2023 study by Koen Abts of the Institute for Social and Political Opinion Research at KU Leuven documented the VB's economic position as somewhere between protectionism and economic liberalism.

=== Foreign policy ===
==== European Union ====
The party describes itself as pro-European in terms of protecting European culture and cooperation between nations to secure peace, but takes a eurosceptic stance towards the European Union and its structures as a whole and argues the EU does not financially benefit Flanders or respect national identities of member states. Political commentators have described the VB as for many years and until recently being Belgium's only and most distinct EU-critical party. In its program, the VB is strongly against any evolution towards a Federal European Superstate, argues for Flemish withdrawal from the Schengen Area and the reinstatement of border controls, abolition of the Eurozone and opposes the accession of Turkey to the European Union. The party states that it supports cooperation of European nations for economic trade and to give Flanders political visibility but calls for the EU to be fundamentally changed into a smaller confederal union of independent nations or abolished if it becomes a Federal Superstate and imposes further open border policies on Flanders.

==== Russia and Ukraine ====
The VB was previously critical of imposing sanctions against Russia and was accused of fostering links to Putin's government with some members of the party visiting representatives of Putin, but following the Russian invasion of Ukraine the party's leadership have condemned the invasion and distanced themselves from Putin with VB politician Filip Dewinter stating Putin had "totally lost it."

VB leader Tom Van Grieken also stated in 2022 that the party "thought at one point Putin was an ally in the fight against multiculturalism, but now it appears we were grossly mistaken" and referred to Putin as a "dictator who commits atrocities."

However, the party remains critical of the impact of sanctions against Russia on fuel prices in Belgium. Since the invasion, the VB has supported supplying humanitarian and military aid to Ukraine, issuing a statement saying "we have always spoken out in favor of supplying defensive equipment and weapons to Ukraine, so that it can defend its sovereign territory against Russian aggression" but has also criticised the financial extent of Belgian military support for Ukraine.

==== Middle East ====
The VB condemned the October 7 attacks, with Van Grieken calling for an end to development aid to the Palestinian territories and criticising the Belgian government for not more clearly describing the attack as a terrorist attack. Van Grieken has affirmed VB's support for Israel's right to exist, opposition to any arms embargo or boycott against Israel, and support for a two-state solution, though he has stated that the two-state solution cannot be implemented until Palestinian terrorist attacks against Israel cease. Though Van Grieken initially stated that VB would not take sides in the Gaza war, he later described Israel's fight against Islamist terrorism as a "fight for the whole world" as part of a "permanent struggle against radical Islam".

== Public reception ==
Like its predecessor, Vlaams Belang has been accused of racism and for promoting hostility and xenophobia by both French and Dutch speaking political opponents and media in Belgium. Although the VB has a large conservative following in the Flemish region, some journalists and political commentators have historically been divided on whether to refer to the VB as a conservative, far-right or an extreme-right party. Individuals associated with the party such as VB spokesman Filip Dewinter and former independent MP Dries Van Langenhove, have been accused of tapping into the Great Replacement theory by using the term omvolking (population replacement) when discussing immigration. Members of the party have been involved in scandals related to neo-Nazism at various points. The VB itself has disputed the extreme or far-right label in recent years.

The party itself has repeatedly denied that it is racist and believes such accusations are based on attempts to discredit the party. Politicians, like former Belgian Prime Minister Guy Verhofstadt (VLD) and Karel De Gucht (VLD) have called the Vlaams Belang and its leaders "fascist". However, history professor Eric Defoort has stated the use of this terminology creates "a distorted image of their antagonist, whom they can then scold with missionary zeal."

=== Collaboration and cordon sanitaire ===
Since its founding, most parties in Belgium have refused to cooperate with the VB and in 2004 continued the cordon sanitaire on the party in the Federal Parliament.

In 2011, all the French speaking Belgian parties in the Federal parliament, as well as the Flemish Groen! and sp.a, called on the Belgian Council of State to withdraw all allocation of parliamentary money to the party, claiming statements and policies proposed by its leadership violated the European Convention on Human Rights (ECHR). However, the Council of State rejected the calls, arguing that the party had not violated the rules of the ECHR and that other accusations made against the party were based on old evidence revolving around the former Vlaams Blok trial. The VB's leadership described the accusations against the party as politically motivated and undemocratic.

Although collaboration with the party still remains controversial within some political circles, more mainstream Belgian politicians have started to discuss the possibility of including the party in coalition talks and lifting the cordon sanitaire, arguing that the VB's gradual moderation and growth in support cannot be ignored and that some of the policies the party has campaigned on have since been adopted by the main parties.

=== Ali statement ===
In 2006 Ayaan Hirsi Ali, a prominent critic of Islam in the Netherlands, and to whom Vlaams Belang on different occasions referred to defend its points of view on Islam, called the party "a racist, anti-Semitic, extremist party that is unkind to women and that should be outlawed." The party responded that Ali had been misinformed and considered this to be part of a smear campaign. Vlaams Belang underlined that Ali supposedly made the statement on the occasion of a debate organised by the left-liberal think tank Liberales, whose president is Dirk Verhofstadt who is known for regularly publishing accusations against the party. Vlaams Belang also wrote an open letter to Ali supporting her work.

=== Raes controversy ===
In September 2024, the party sparked controversy by putting Roeland Raes who had previously been convicted of Holocaust denial as one of its candidates in the upcoming municipal elections before removing his candidacy the following day.

== Organization ==
=== Leadership ===
==== Party chairmen ====
- 2004–2008: Frank Vanhecke
- 2008–2012: Bruno Valkeniers
- 2012–2014: Gerolf Annemans
- 2014–present: Tom Van Grieken

==== Faction leaders ====
- Party chairman: Tom Van Grieken
- Chamber of Representatives: Barbara Pas
- Senate: Guy D'haeseleer
- Flemish Parliament: Chris Janssens
- European Parliament: Gerolf Annemans
- Brussels Parliament: Dominiek Lootens-Stael

=== International relations ===
In the European Parliament, the party has generally been part of the Non-Inscrits. In 2007, the party was however part of the short-lived European Parliament group Identity, Tradition and Sovereignty alongside parties such as the French National Front. The party has also had some contacts with the Freedom Party of Austria, the Italian Northern League, the Dutch Party for Freedom, the Danish People's Party, the Slovak National Party, the now-defunct German Freedom Party, and the Sweden Democrats. Spokespeople of the party's hardline faction have also held meetings with overseas neo-fascist parties, such as the British National Party, Greek Golden Dawn and the Japanese ultra-nationalist Nippon Issuikai movement, which have sometimes caused internal disputes with the VB's moderate wing while the VB leadership has tried to discourage its members from associating with neo-Nazi organizations in more recent years.

In October 2007, the party hosted the international counter-jihad conference in the European and Flemish Parliaments in Brussels together with Edward "Ned" May of the blog Gates of Vienna, which brought together many counter-jihad ideologues including Bat Ye'or, Pamela Geller, Robert Spencer, Gerard Batten, Hans Jansen, Andrew G. Bostom, Paul Beliën, Aryeh Eldad and Lars Hedegaard.

In the ninth European Parliament, the party sat with France's National Rally, Italy's Lega Nord, the Freedom Party of Austria, Alternative for Germany and the Conservative People's Party of Estonia in the Identity and Democracy parliamentary group. In 2024, the party's relations with the AfD became somewhat strained due to statements made by AfD candidates on Nazi Germany with the VB's European delegation saying it would wait until after the 2024 European election to see if the two parties would continue collaborating. In September 2024, VB issued a statement congratulating the AfD for its strong result in the 2024 state elections in Saxony and Thuringia.

In the tenth European Parliament, the VB announced it would join the Patriots for Europe group, which was founded by Viktor Orban, the leader of the Hungarian Fidesz party.

Outside the EU, it has ties to the Israeli Likud, the Swiss People's Party, the Serbian People's Party, South Africa's Freedom Front Plus, and the US Republican Party.

== Election results ==
=== Chamber of Representatives ===
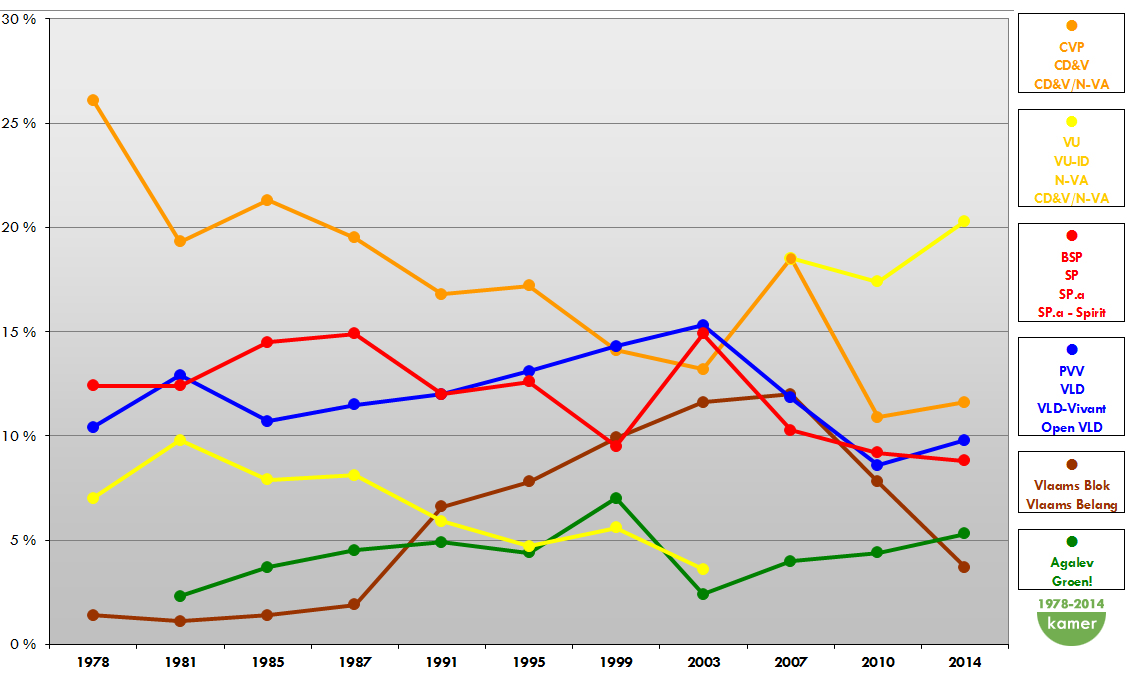
The main six Flemish political parties and their results for the Chamber of Representatives. From 1978 to 2014, in percentages for the whole Kingdom.

Election	Votes	%	Seats	+/-	Government
2007	799,844	12.0	17 / 150	▼1 (Note: Compared to Vlaams Blok in the 2003 federal election.)	Opposition
2010	506,697	7.8	12 / 150	▼5	Opposition
2014	247,746	3.7	3 / 150	▼9	Opposition
2019	810,177	11.9	18 / 150	▲15	Opposition
2024	959,988	14.42	20 / 150	▲2	Opposition

=== Senate ===
Election	Votes	%	Seats	+/-
2007	787,782	11.9	5 / 40	0 (Note: Compared to Vlaams Blok in the 2003 federal election.)
2010	491,519	7.6	3 / 40	▼2
2014			2 / 60	▼1
2019			7 / 60	▲5

=== Regional ===
==== Brussels Parliament ====
Election	Votes	%		Seats	Seats D.E.C.	+/-	Government
Election	Votes	D.E.C.	Overall	Seats	Seats D.E.C.	+/-	Government
2009	9,072	17.5 (#3)		3 / 89	3 / 17	▼3 (Note: Compared to Vlaams Blok in the 2004 Brussels Parliament elections.)	Opposition
2014	3,006	5.6 (#6)		1 / 89	1 / 17	▼2	Opposition
2019	5,838	8.3 (#5)		1 / 89	1 / 17	0	Opposition
2024	8,475	10.5		2 / 89	2 / 17	▲1	Opposition

==== Flemish Parliament ====
Election	Votes	%	Seats	+/-	Government
2009	628,564	15.3 (#2)	21 / 124	▼11 (Note: Compared to Vlaams Blok in the 2004 Flemish Parliament elections.)	Opposition
2014	232,813	6.0 (#6)	6 / 124	▼15	Opposition
2019	783,977	18.5 (#2)	23 / 124	▲17	Opposition
2024	992,175	22.7 (#2)	31 / 124	▲8	Opposition

=== European Parliament ===
Election	List leader	Votes	%		Seats	+/-	EP Group
Election	List leader	Votes	D.E.C.	Overall	Seats	+/-	EP Group
2009	Frank Vanhecke	647,170	15.88 (#3)	9.85	2 / 22	▼1 (Note: Compared to Vlaams Blok in the 2004 European Parliament election.)	NI
2014	Gerolf Annemans	284,891	6.76 (#6)	4.35	1 / 21	▼1	ENF
2019	Gerolf Annemans	811,169	19.08 (#2)	12.05	3 / 21	▲2	ID
2024	Tom Vandendriessche	1,034,112	22.94 (#1)	14.50	3 / 22	0	PfE

== Representation ==
=== European politics ===
VB holds three seats in the tenth European Parliament (2024–2029) for the Dutch-speaking electoral college.

European Parliament
Name	In office	Parliamentary group
Tom Vandendriessche	2019–present	Patriots for Europe
Gerolf Annemans	2014–present	Patriots for Europe
Barbara Bonte	2024–present	Patriots for Europe

=== Federal politics ===
Chamber of Representatives (2024–2029)
Constituency	Name	Notes
Antwerp	Lode Vereeck	
Antwerp	Marijke Dillen	
Antwerp	Reccino Van Lommel	
Antwerp	Ellen Samyn	
Antwerp	Sam van Rooy	
East Flanders	Barbara Pas	Floor leader
East Flanders	Werner Somers	
East Flanders	Pieter De Spiegeleer	
East Flanders	Ortwin Depoortere	
East Flanders	Francesca Van Belleghem	
East Flanders	Alexander Van Hoecke	
West Flanders	Wouter Vermeersch	
West Flanders	Kristien Verbelen	
West Flanders	Kurt Ravyts	
West Flanders	Dominiek Spinnewyn-Sneppe	
Flemish Brabant	Britt Huybrechts	
Flemish Brabant	Katleen Bury	
Flemish Brabant	Kurt Moons	
Limburg (Belgium)	Annick Ponthier	
Limburg (Belgium)	Dieter Keuten	
Limburg (Belgium)	Frank Troosters	

Senate (2024–2029)
Type	Name
Community senator	Anke Van dermeersch
Community senator	Bob De Brabandere
Community senator	Yves Buysse
Community senator	Klaas Slootmans
Community senator	Ilse Malfroot
Community senator	Wim Verheyden
Community senator	Johan Deckmyn
Community senator	Hans Verreyt

==== Flemish Parliament ====
Flemish Parliament (2024–2029)
Constituency	Name	Notes
Antwerp	Tom Van Grieken	
Antwerp	Anke Van dermeersch	
Antwerp	Filip Dewinter	
Antwerp	Bart Claes	
Antwerp	Bart Van Opstal	
Antwerp	Els Sterckx	
Antwerp	Dries Devillé	
East Flanders	Guy D'haeseleer	
East Flanders	Freija Van den Driessche	
East Flanders	Kristof Slagmulder	
East Flanders	Filip Brusselmans	
East Flanders	Johan Deckmyn	
East Flanders	Ilse Malfroot	
East Flanders	Adeline Blancquaert	
Flemish Brabant	Klaas Slootmans	
Flemish Brabant	Suzy Wouters	
Flemish Brabant	Jan Laeremans	
Flemish Brabant	Frédéric Erens	
West Flanders	Immanuel De Reuse	
West Flanders	Sarah T'Joens	
West Flanders	Stefaan Sintobin	
West Flanders	Tom Lamont	
West Flanders	Carmen Ryheul	
Limburg (Belgium)	Chris Janssens	Floor leader
Limburg (Belgium)	Roosmarijn Beckers	
Limburg (Belgium)	Leo Pieters	
Limburg (Belgium)	Michiel Awouters	
Limburg (Belgium)	Mercina Claesen	

==== Parliament of the Brussels-Capital Region ====
Brussels Regional Parliament (2024–2029)
Name	Notes
Bob De Brabandere
Sonja Hoylaerts

== Bibliography ==
- Coffé, Hilde (2005). "The adaptation of the extreme right's discourse: the case of the Vlaams Blok". Ethical Perspectives. European Centre for Ethics, Katholieke Universiteit Leuven: 205–230. doi:10.2143/EP.12.2.630049.
- De Winter, Lieven (July 2004). Casals, Xavier (ed.). The Vlaams Blok and the heritage of extreme-right flemish-nationalism. The extreme right in Europe, a many faceted reality. Sabadell University.
- Erik, Jan (May 2005). "From Vlaams Blok to Vlaams Belang: The Belgian Far-Right Renames Itself". West European Politics. 28 (3): 493–502. doi:10.1080/01402380500085681. S2CID 143126680.
- Swyngedouw, Marc; Abts, Koen; Van Craaen, Maarten (2007). "Our Own People First in a Europe of Peoples: The International Policy of the Vlaams Blok". In Liang, Christina Schori (ed.). Europe for the Europeans: the foreign and security policy of the populist radical right. Ashgate. pp. 81–102. ISBN 978-0-7546-4851-2.
