= Tom Van Grieken =

Belgian politician (born 1986)

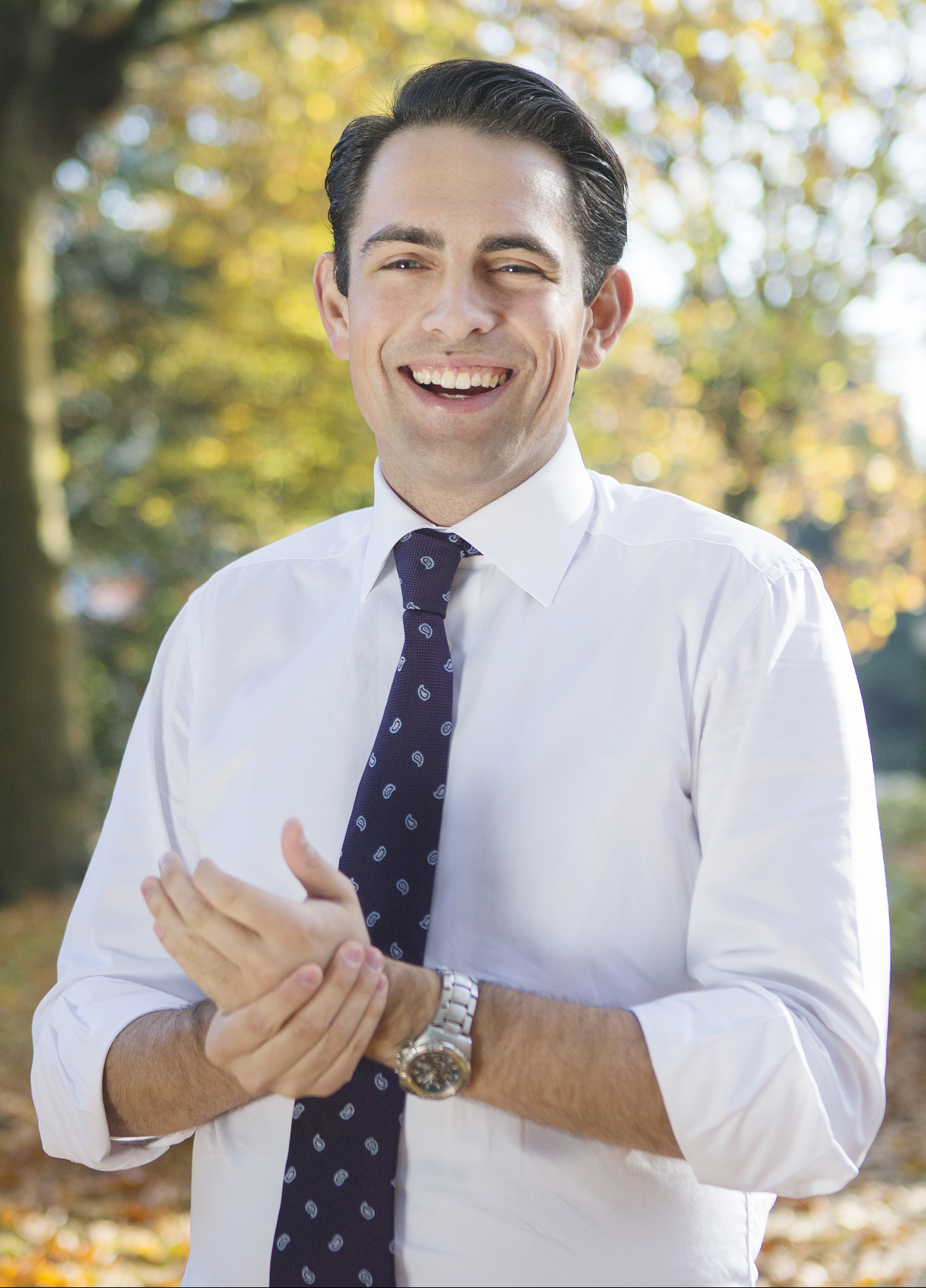
- Van Grieken in 2015

Leader of Vlaams Belang
- Incumbent
- Assumed office 19 October 2014
- Preceded by: Gerolf Annemans

Member of the Chamber of Representatives
- Incumbent
- Assumed office 26 May 2019

Member of the Flemish Parliament
- In office 2 July 2014 – 22 May 2019

Personal details
- Born: Tom Jozef Irène Van Grieken; 7 October 1986 (age 39) Antwerp, Belgium
- Party: Vlaams Belang (since 2004)
- Other political affiliations: Vlaams Blok (2003–2004)
- Education: Plantijn Hogeschool

Tom Jozef Irène Van Grieken (born 7 October 1986) is a Belgian politician and author who has served as leader of the radical-right Vlaams Belang party since October 2014.

== Early life ==
Van Grieken was born in Antwerp. He spent ten years of his childhood in the Carnotstraat area of the city, which is known for its large immigrant population, and later as a teenager moved to Mortsel, where he later served as a municipal councillor. His father, Luc Van Grieken, is a retired police officer of the Federal Belgian Police and his mother worked at a florist store.

Van Grieken attended secondary school at the Sint-Jan Berchmanscollege in Antwerp, where he stood out by distributing pamphlets at the school gate at the age of 16 with the slogan "Stop leftist language in our classroom." According to his father, the street riots with the Arab European League that took place on the Turnhoutsebaan in 2002, which the young Van Grieken personally witnessed, further strengthened his Flemish nationalist sentiments.

He studied communications management at the Plantijn Hogeschool and worked in the advertising sector prior to entering politics full time.

== Political career ==
=== National politics ===
As a pupil and a student, Van Grieken was active in the NJSV and the NSV, eventually becoming national president of the NSV. Van Grieken became a member of Vlaams Blok in 2003 as a teenager and subsequently joined its successor Vlaams Belang. After his studies, Van Grieken was elected national president of Vlaams Belang Jongeren, the youth wing of Vlaams Belang. In September 2014, he was nominated by the party's council to become the party's new leader. At the party's congress in October he ran unopposed and obtained 93% of the votes, becoming Belgium's youngest party leader ever.

Although initially known as a hardliner within the party, he has since attempted as leader to moderate the VB's image in order to break the cordon sanitaire imposed on the party, stating "There is no cordon sanitaire around our ideas, but there is about our style."

He was a member of the municipal council of Mortsel from 2007 until 2018 and was elected to the Flemish Parliament in 2014. He was elected as a member of the municipal council of Schoten, where he still lives now, in 2018.

Under his leadership the VB has seen a massive increase in public support, including finishing in second place in the Flemish region during the 2019 federal elections in which Van Grieken was elected to the Chamber of Representatives. Following the election, he became the first leader of the VB to attend a meeting with King Philippe along with the other main party leaders.

In November 2019, he was reelected as party leader and obtained 97.4% of the votes. The Vlaams Belang party has remained relatively popular under his leadership. In a poll published in December 2019, Vlaams Belang polled 27.3 percent, making it the biggest party in Flanders and Belgium as a whole.

During the legislature 2019-2024, Vlaams Belang professionalized further and gained substantial support in numerous polls as the challenger of the system. Van Grieken was tipped by Politico as 'Disrupter No.6 - "The Breakup Artist" in their "Class of 2024"', referring to the secessionist position held by Van Grieken and his party.

He was interviewed by The Wall Street Journal, The Financial Times and The Brussels Times on his Flemish independentist and migration critical stance.

In the Flemish elections on 9 June 2024, Van Grieken was the lead candidate for Vlaams Belang in Antwerp and was re-elected to the Flemish Parliament with 153,596 preference votes. Vlaams Belang gained substantially during the elections, becoming the biggest party in three of the five Flemish provinces and gaining a million votes in total in the European election.

During the local elections on 13 October of that year, Van Grieken was once again the lead candidate in Schoten. He received 4,388 preference votes, more than the incumbent mayor. After the local elections, the cordon sanitaire was broken locally in Ranst on the day that Tom Van Grieken celebrated his tenth year as president of the party. Afterwards the party also joined the municipal coalition in Izegem and Brecht, besides governing locally with an absolute majority in Ninove.

=== Council of Europe ===
Tom Van Grieken speaking at CPAC Hungary 2026

Tom Van Grieken has been a member of the Parliamentary Assembly of the Council of Europe since 30 September 2019. Together with party senator Bob De Brabandere, he is a member of the political group European Conservatives Group and Democratic Alliance, which houses amongst others the British Conservative Party.

== Political ideas ==
=== Flemish nationalism ===
Along with the VB's platform, Van Grieken supports independence for the Dutch-speaking Flemish region of Belgium. He argues that the Flemish and Walloon regions have too many political and cultural differences which paralyzes the Belgian state and holds Flanders back from greater success. He calls himself a Flemish patriot rather than a nationalist. He frequently states that patriotism is love and he compares the love for one's country to the love that a mother has for her child: "Patriotism is love. A mother loves her child and wants to protect it above all other children. That doesn't mean she hates the other children. A state is the same. It has a duty to first take care of its own citizens. You can only spend every euro once. Only if the needs of our own citizens are taken care of, we can consider helping others."

=== Support for Donald Trump ===
Van Grieken supported Donald Trump for president. He saw the election of Donald Trump (and Brexit) as the start of "a patriotic wave that will roll over Europe". He publicly defended Trump multiple times and on many occasions accused the Flemish and European media of being biased against the United States president. Van Grieken was invited and went to the inauguration of president Trump in January 2025.

== Publications ==
On 3 May 2017 Tom Van Grieken published his first book titled Toekomst in eigen handen (translated: "The future in our own hands"). It was the first time in the history of the party that a book by a leading member was also for sale in regular bookshops. Even before publication, the book already caused a stir, due to the fact that professor of international politics Jonathan Holslag wrote the foreword. The general reception of the book was also a step in a new direction for the Vlaams Belang. Flemish journalist Walter Pauli wrote in the weekly news magazine Knack: "In their heyday, members of the Vlaams Belang party could only have dreamed of receiving the same reception as the new book by Vlaams Belang-chairman Tom Van Grieken." Het Laatste Nieuws, the biggest Flemish newspaper, read "surprising ideas" in it. Another newspaper, De Standaard, remarked: "The program remains radical, yet Van Grieken's use of language never goes out of line."

In 2020, Van Grieken published And Now It's Up To Us, a biographical account of his leadership of VB to date and the journey he took in trying to rebuild the party and revive its support.

Together with Francesca Van Belleghem, he also wrote the book Migration Stop, which was published on April 16, 2024. In the book, the authors criticize the current migration policy and propose 116 migration-restricting measures that could be implemented within the existing legal framework.

== Personal life ==
Van Grieken is married and has two children.
