= List of members of the Flemish Parliament, 1995–1999 =

Flemish Parliament, 1995–99

Overview
- Legislative body: Flemish Parliament
- Meeting place: Brussels
- Term: June 1995 – May 1999
- Election: 21 May 1995
- Government: Van den Brande IV Government
- Members: 124
- Speaker: Norbert De Batselier (SP)

This is a list of members of the Flemish Parliament between 1995 and 1999, following the (first) direct elections of 1995.

== Composition ==
Party	Seats	Antwerp	Brussels	East Flanders	Flemish Brabant	Limburg	West Flanders
Christian People's Party (Christelijke Volkspartij, CVP)	37	9	2	8	5	5	8
Flemish Liberals and Democrats (Vlaamse Liberalen en Democraten, VLD)	27	6	1	7	5	3	5
Socialist Party (Socialistische Partij, SP)	26	6	1	6	4	4	5
Flemish Bloc (Vlaams Blok, VB)	17	7	2	3	2	1	2
People's Union (Volksunie, VU)	9	2	0	2	2	1	2
Agalev (AGALEV)	7	3	0	2	1	1	0
Union of Francophones (Union des Francophones, UF)	1	0	0	0	1	0	0
	124	33	6	28	20	15	22

== By party ==
=== CVP (37) ===
1. (Flemish Brabant) Sonja Becq
2. Georges Beerden
3. Jan Béghin (25 September 1997) replaced Brigitte Grouwels (04-07-1995 – 22 September 1997)
4. Leo Cannaerts
5. (Flemish Brabant) Georges Cardoen
6. Joachim Coens
7. Carl Decaluwe (04-07-1995 –
8. Leo Delcroix
9. Jos De Meyer
10. Paul Deprez
11. Johan De Roo
12. Mia De Schamphelaere
13. Peter Desmet
14. Michel Doomst (04-07-1995 –
15. Paul Dumez (04-07-1995 –
16. Veerle Heeren
17. Kathleen Helsen replaced Herman Candries (31 January 1998)
18. Hugo Marsoul
19. Erik Matthijs
20. Trees Merckx
21. Marc Olivier
22. Leonard Quintelier
23. Freddy Sarens
24. Eddy Schuermans (04-07-1995 –
25. Herman Suykerbuyk
26. John Taylor
27. Maria Tyberghien-Vandenbussche
28. Riet Van Cleuvenbergen
29. Walter Vandenbossche
30. Bart Vandendriessche
31. Mark Van der Poorten
32. Mieke Van Hecke
33. Gilbert Vanleenhove
34. Jef Van Looy
35. Marc Van Peel
36. Hugo Van Rompaey
37. Johan Weyts

=== VLD (27) ===
Representative	Province
Yolande Avontroodt	Antwerp
Ward Beysen	Antwerp
Louis Bril	West Flanders
Joseph Browaeys	East Flanders
Patricia Ceysens	Flemish Brabant
Marc Cordeel	East Flanders
Etienne De Groot	Antwerp
Karel De Gucht	East Flanders
Annie De Maght-Aelbrecht	East Flanders
Julien Demeulenaere	West Flanders
André Denys	East Flanders
Roland Deswaene	East Flanders
Jacques Devolder	West Flanders
Freddy Feytons	Limburg
Jaak Gabriels	Limburg
Leo Goovaerts	Brussels
Marino Keulen	Limburg
Patrick Lachaert	East Flanders
Jacques Laverge	West Flanders
Stefaan Platteau	Flemish Brabant
Didier Ramoudt	West Flanders
Arnold Van Aperen	Antwerp
Marleen Vanderpoorten	Antwerp
Sonja Van Lindt	Flemish Brabant
Dirk Van Mechelen	Antwerp
Mandus Verlinden	Flemish Brabant
Francis Vermeiren	Flemish Brabant

=== SP (26) ===
Representative	Province
Eddy Baldewijns (resigned in 1995)	Limburg
Gilbert Bossuyt	West Flanders
Norbert De Batselier	East Flanders
Herman De Loor	East Flanders
Jasmina Alajbegovic	Antwerp
Fred Dielens	Flemish Brabant
Marcel Gesquiere (resigned in 1995)	West Flanders
Johnny Goos	West Flanders
Patrick Hostekint	West Flanders
André Kenzeler	Limburg
Kathy Lindekens	Antwerp
Carlos Lisabeth	East Flanders
Marcel Logist	Flemish Brabant
Lydia Maximus (resigned in 1999)	Antwerp
Jef Sleeckx	Antwerp
Steve Stevaert (resigned in 1998)	Limburg
Guy Swennen	Limburg
René Swinnen	Flemish Brabant
Jacques Timmermans	East Flanders
Bruno Tobback	Flemish Brabant
Anne Van Asbroeck (resigned in 1995, returned in 1999)	Brussels
Luc Van den Bossche (resigned in 1995)	East Flanders
Gracienne Van Nieuwenborgh	East Flanders
André Van Nieuwkerke	West Flanders
Tuur Van Wallendael	Antwerp
Robert Voorhamme	Antwerp

=== VB (17) ===
Representative	Province
Wilfried Aers	East Flanders
Jan Caubergs	Limburg
Frank Creyelman	Antwerp
Herman De Reuse	West Flanders
Filip Dewinter	Antwerp
Marijke Dillen	Antwerp
Pieter Huybrechts	Antwerp
Dominiek Lootens-Stael	Brussels
Jan Penris	Antwerp
Felix Strackx	Flemish Brabant
Joris Van Hauthem	Flemish Brabant
Luk Van Nieuwenhuysen	Antwerp
Karim Van Overmeire	East Flanders
Roeland Van Walleghem	Brussels
Christian Verougstraete	West Flanders
Miel Verrijken	Antwerp
Frans Wymeersch	East Flanders

=== VU (9) ===
Representative	Province
Jean-Marie Bogaert	West Flanders
Willy Kuijpers (resigned in 1997)	Flemish Brabant
Herman Lauwers	Antwerp
Nelly Maes (resigned in 1998)	East Flanders
Johan Sauwens	Limburg
Chris Vandenbroeke	West Flanders
Kris Van Dijck	Antwerp
Paul Van Grembergen	East Flanders
Etienne Van Vaerenbergh	Flemish Brabant

=== AGALEV (7) ===
Representative	Province
Vera Dua	East Flanders
Jos Geysels	Antwerp
Johan Malcorps	Antwerp
Ludo Sannen	Limburg
Jos Stassen	East Flanders
Ria Van Den Heuvel	Antwerp
Cecile Verwimp	Flemish Brabant

=== UF (1) ===
Representative	Province
Christian Van Eyken	Flemish Brabant

== Changes during the legislature ==
=== Representatives who resigned ===
Name	Party	Date	Replacement	Reason
Jos Chabert	CVP	4 June 1995	Brigitte Grouwels	Became Brussels minister in Picqué II
Rufin Grijp	SP	4 June 1995	Michiel Vandenbussche	Became Brussels minister in Picqué II
Eddy Baldewijns	SP	20 June 1995	Peter Vanvelthoven	Became Flemish minister in Van den Brande IV
Wivina Demeester	CVP	20 June 1995	Paul Dumez	Became Flemish minister in Van den Brande IV
Theo Kelchtermans	CVP	20 June 1995	Eddy Schuermans	Became Flemish minister in Van den Brande IV
Luc Martens	CVP	20 June 1995	Carl Decaluwé	Became Flemish minister in Van den Brande IV
Anne Van Asbroeck	SP	20 June 1995	Michiel Vandenbussche	Became Flemish minister in Van den Brande IV
Luc Van den Bossche	SP	20 June 1995	Freddy De Vilder	Became Flemish minister in Van den Brande IV
Luc Van den Brande	CVP	20 June 1995	Herman Candries	Became Flemish minister-president in Van den Brande IV
Eric Van Rompuy	CVP	20 June 1995	Michel Doomst	Became Flemish minister in Van den Brande IV
Marcel Gesquiere	SP	1 October 1995	Jacky Maes	
Willy Kuijpers	VU	1 March 1997	Gerda Raskin	
Brigitte Grouwels	CVP	22 September 1997	Jan Béghin	Became Flemish minister in Van den Brande IV
Steve Stevaert	SP	28 September 1998	Peter Dufaux	Became Flemish minister in Van den Brande IV
Nelly Maes	VU	19 October 1998	Lieven Dehandschutter	Became member of the European Parliament
Lydia Maximus	SP	16 January 1999	Marc De Laet	
Michiel Vandenbussche	SP	2 March 1999	Anne Van Asbroeck	

=== Representatives who changed parties ===
Name	Date	Old party	New party
Jan Caubergs	11 June 1996	VB	Independent
