= List of members of the Flemish Parliament, 2004–09 =

Flemish Parliament, 2004–09

Overview
- Legislative body: Flemish Parliament
- Meeting place: Brussels
- Term: July 2004 – April 2009
- Election: 13 June 2004
- Government: Until June 2007: Leterme Govt. From June 2007: Peeters I Govt.
- Members: 124
- Speaker: Until 12 July 2006: Norbert De Batselier (sp.a); From 13 July 2006: Marleen Vanderpoorten (VLD)

This is a list of members of the Flemish Parliament in the 2004–2009 legislature.

The government majority was formed by a coalition of CD&V/N-VA, sp.a-Spirit and VLD-Vivant. Vlaams Blok and Groen! were thus the opposition parties, along with one French-speaking representative.

== Election results ==
Party	Votes	%	Seats			
Party	Votes	%	Flanders	Brussels	Total	+/-
Christian Democratic and Flemish-New Flemish Alliance	1,060,580	26.09	34	1	35	+5
Flemish Block	981,587	24.15	29	3	32	+10
Flemish Liberals and Democrats-Vivant	804,578	19.79	24	1	25	-2
Socialist Party Differently-Spirit	799,325	19.66	24	1	25	+6
Groen!	308,898	7.60	6	–	6	-6
Union of Francophones	43,391	1.07	1	–	1	–
Workers' Party of Belgium+	22,874	0.56	–	–	–	–
Belgische Unie – Union Belge	9,535	0.23	–	–	–	–
National Front	7,388	0.18	–	–	–	–
Solide	6,033	0.15	–	–	–	–
Respect	5,227	0.13	–	–	–	–
MDP	4,187	0.10	–	–	–	–
PvdD	2,640	0.06	–	–	–	–
Left Socialist Party	2,509	0.06	–	–	–	–
STA OP	1,821	0.04	–	–	–	–
B.U.B.	1,723	0.04	–	–	–	–
Vrijheid, Intimiteit, Thuis, Arbeid en Liefde	1,332	0.03	–	–	–	–
MRV	761	0.02	–	–	–	–
VDB	357	0.01	–	–	–	–
Total	4,064,746	100.00	118	6	124	13
Valid votes	4,064,746	94.87				
Invalid/blank votes	219,910	5.13				
Total votes	4,284,656	100.00				
Registered voters/turnout	4,568,250	93.79				
Source: Belgian Elections

== By party ==
=== SP.A (22) ===
Representative	Electoral district
Jos Bex (ex Vl.Pro) ← B. Tobback	Flemish Brabant
Gilbert Bossuyt	West Flanders
Bart Caron (ex Vl.Pro) ← Landuyt (SP.A)	West Flanders
Philippe De Coene ← Maes	West Flanders
Kurt De Loor	East Flanders
Else De Wachter	Flemish Brabant
Michèle Hostekint	Flemish Brabant
Jasmina Alajbegovic	Antwerp
Flor Koninckx ← Vandenbroucke	Flemish Brabant
Marcel Logist	Flemish Brabant
Chokri Mahassine	Limburg
Bart Martens	Antwerp
Els Robeyns ← Claes	Limburg
Jan Roegiers (ex Vl.Pro)	East Flanders
Elke Roex ← Anciaux (ex Vl.Pro)	Brussels
Ludo Sannen	Limburg
Anissa Temsamani	Antwerp
Bart Van Malderen ← van Nieuwenborg	East Flanders
André Van Nieuwkerke ← Vande Lanotte	West Flanders
Dany Vandenbossche ← Van den Bossche	East Flanders
Joris Vandenbroucke (ex Vl.Pro) ← Stevaert	Limburg
Jo Vermeulen ← Gennez ← Van Brempt	Antwerp
Robert Voorhamme ← Detiège	Antwerp

=== GROEN! (6) ===
Representative	Electoral district
Rudi Daems	Antwerp
Vera Dua	East Flanders
Eloi Glorieux	Flemish Brabant
Jos Stassen	East Flanders
Jef Tavernier	West Flanders
Mieke Vogels	Antwerp

=== N-VA (5) ===
Representative	Electoral district
Geert Bourgeois ← Loones ← Bourgeois	West Flanders
Mark Demesmaeker	Flemish Brabant
Jan Peumans	Limburg
Helga Stevens	East Flanders
Kris Van Dijck	Antwerp

=== UF (1) ===
Representative	Electoral district
Christian Van Eyken	Flemish Brabant

=== Defunct party: SPIRIT → VL.PRO → SLP ===
Representative	New affiliation
Bert Anciaux	SP.A
Jos Bex	Independent → SP.A
Bart Caron	Independent → Groen!
Dirk De Cock ← De Batselier (SP.A)	Independent
Jan Roegiers	Independent → SP.A
Joris Vandenbroucke	Independent → SP.A
Els Van Weert ← Lauwers ← Vermeulen (SP.A) ← Van Weert	Independent

== Changes during the legislature ==
=== Representatives who resigned ===
Name	Fraction	Constituency	Date of resignation	Replacement	Reason
Frank Van Hecke	Vlaams Belang	Antwerp	13 June 2004	Christian Verougstraete	Became member of European Parliament
Dirk Sterckx	Open VLD	Antwerp	22 July 2004	Jul Van Aperen	Became member of European Parliament
Bert Anciaux	Spirit	Brussels-Capital Region	22 July 2004	Elke Roex	Became Flemish minister in Leterme I
Marino Keulen	Open VLD	Limburg	22 July 2004	Laurence Libert	Became Flemish minister in Leterme I
Dirk Van Mechelen	Open VLD	Antwerp	22 July 2004	Marc van den Abeelen	Became Flemish minister in Leterme I
Kathleen Van Brempt	SP.A	Flemish Brabant	22 July 2004	Caroline Gennez	Became Flemish minister in Leterme I
Frank Vandenbroucke	SP.A	Flemish Brabant	22 July 2004	Flor Koninckx	Became Flemish minister in Leterme I
Inge Vervotte	CD&V	Antwerp	22 July 2004	Cathy Berx	Became Flemish minister in Leterme I
Hendrik Bogaert	CD&V	West Flanders	4 July 2007	Martine Fournier	Became federal representative
Jean-Marie Dedecker	Open VLD	West Flanders	4 July 2007	Patrick De Klerck	Became federal representative
Bart De Wever	N-VA	Antwerp	4 July 2007	Dirk de Kort	Became federal representative
Etienne Schouppe	CD&V	East Flanders	4 July 2007	Cindy Franssen	Became federal senator
Bart Somers	Open VLD	Antwerp	4 July 2007	Hans Schoofs	Became federal representative
Steven Vanackere	CD&V	Brussels-Capital Region	4 July 2007	Paul Delva	Became federal representative
Linda Vissers	Vlaams Belang	Limburg	4 July 2007	Leo Pieters	Became federal representative
Caroline Gennez	SP.A	Antwerp	31 December 2007	Jo Vermeulen	
Cathy Berx	CD&V	Antwerp	25 April 2008	Ward Kennes	Became governor of Antwerp

=== Representatives who changed parties ===
Name	Date	Old party	New party
Bart Caron	3 February 2009	SP.A	Independent
