= Tongeren-Maaseik (Chamber of Representatives constituency) =

Former Belgian national legislative constituency

Tongeren-Maaseik was a constituency used to elect members of the Belgian Chamber of Representatives between 1900 and 1995.

== Representatives ==
Election	Representative (Party)	Representative (Party)	Representative (Party)	Representative (Party)	Representative (Party)	Representative (Party)	Representative (Party)	Representative (Party)
1900	Formed from a merger of Tongeren and Maaseik							
1900	Camille Desmaisières (Catholic)	Henri Gielen (Catholic)	Joris Helleputte (Catholic)	3 seats				
1904	Camille Desmaisières (Catholic)	Henri Gielen (Catholic)	Joris Helleputte (Catholic)	3 seats				
1908	François de Schaetzen (Catholic)	Paul Neven (Liberal)	Joris Helleputte (Catholic)	3 seats				
1912	François de Schaetzen (Catholic)	Paul Neven (Liberal)	Joris Helleputte (Catholic)	Henri Gielen (Catholic)	4 seats			
1919	François de Schaetzen (Catholic)	Paul Neven (Liberal)	Joris Helleputte (Catholic)	Frans Theelen (Catholic)	4 seats			
1921	François de Schaetzen (Catholic)	Paul Neven (Liberal)	Jan Rutten (Catholic)	Frans Theelen (Catholic)	4 seats			
1925	François de Schaetzen (Catholic)	Pierre Beckers (Catholic)	Jan Rutten (Catholic)	Frans Theelen (Catholic)	4 seats			
1929	Gérard Romsée (Frontpartij)	Paul Neven (Liberal)	Jan Rutten (Catholic)	Frans Theelen (Catholic)	4 seats			
1932	Gérard Romsée (Frontpartij)	Georges de Schaetzen van Brienen (Catholic)	Henricus Vaes (Catholic)	Pierre Beckers (Catholic)	4 seats			
1936	Gérard Romsée (Frontpartij)	Fernand Philips (Liberal)	Henricus Vaes (Catholic)	Pierre Beckers (Catholic)	Mathieu Croonenberghs (VNV)	5 seats		
1939	Gérard Romsée (Frontpartij)	Andries Mondelaers (Catholic)	Henricus Vaes (Catholic)	Pierre Beckers (Catholic)	Pierre Dexters (Catholic)	5 seats		
1946	Jozef Dupont (CVP)	Lambert Goffings (CVP)	Louis Roppe (CVP)	Pierre Diriken (BSP)	Pierre Dexters (Catholic)	5 seats		
1949	Jozef Dupont (CVP)	Lambert Goffings (CVP)	Louis Roppe (CVP)	Frans Robyns (CVP)	Pierre Dexters (Catholic)	Nik Meertens (CVP)	6 seats	
1950	Jozef Dupont (CVP)	Lambert Goffings (CVP)	Germaine Craeybeckx-Orij (CVP)	Frans Robyns (CVP)	Pierre Dexters (Catholic)	Pierre Diriken (BSP)	6 seats	
1954	Jozef Dupont (CVP)	Pieter Wirix (CVP)	Germaine Craeybeckx-Orij (CVP)	Frans Robyns (CVP)	Pierre Dexters (Catholic)	Pierre Diriken (BSP)	6 seats	
1958	Jozef Dupont (CVP)	Pieter Wirix (CVP)	Germaine Craeybeckx-Orij (CVP)	Frans Robyns (CVP)	Pierre Dexters (Catholic)	Walthère Thys (BSP)	6 seats	
1961	Jozef Dupont (CVP)	Pieter Wirix (CVP)	Germaine Craeybeckx-Orij (CVP)	Frans Robyns (CVP)	Lambert Kelchtermans (CVP)	Walthère Thys (BSP)	6 seats	
1965	Jozef Dupont (CVP)	Pieter Wirix (CVP)	Germaine Craeybeckx-Orij (CVP)	Frans Wijnen (CVP)	Lambert Kelchtermans (CVP)	Walthère Thys (BSP)	Fernand Colla (PVV)	7 seats
1968	Leo Van Raemdonck (CVP)	Evrard Raskin (VU)	Germaine Craeybeckx-Orij (CVP)	Frans Wijnen (CVP)	Lambert Kelchtermans (CVP)	Jean Férir (BSP)	Fernand Colla (PVV)	7 seats
1971	Mathieu Rutten (CVP)	Evrard Raskin (VU)	Germaine Craeybeckx-Orij (CVP)	Raymond Clercx (PVV)	Lambert Kelchtermans (CVP)	Jean Férir (BSP)	Fernand Colla (PVV)	7 seats
1974	Mathieu Rutten (CVP)	Evrard Raskin (VU)	Chris Moors (CVP)	Frans Wijnen (CVP)	Lambert Kelchtermans (CVP)	Jean Férir (BSP)	Fernand Colla (PVV)	7 seats
1977	Mathieu Rutten (CVP)	Jaak Gabriëls (VU)	Chris Moors (CVP)	André Rutten (CVP)	Lambert Kelchtermans (CVP)	Louis Vanvelthoven (BSP)	Fernand Colla (PVV)	7 seats
1978	Mathieu Rutten (CVP)	Jaak Gabriëls (VU)	Chris Moors (CVP)	André Rutten (CVP)	Lambert Kelchtermans (CVP)	Louis Vanvelthoven (BSP)	Fernand Colla (PVV)	7 seats
1981	Theo Kelchtermans (CVP)	Jaak Gabriëls (VU)	Chris Moors (CVP)	Vic Peuskens (PS)	Lambert Kelchtermans (CVP)	Louis Vanvelthoven (BSP)	Fernand Colla (PVV)	7 seats
1985	Theo Kelchtermans (CVP)	Jaak Gabriëls (VU)	Chris Moors (CVP)	Vic Peuskens (PS)	Alex Vangronsveld (CVP)	Louis Vanvelthoven (BSP)	Patrick Dewael (PVV)	Johan Sauwens (VU)
1988	Theo Kelchtermans (CVP)	Jaak Gabriëls (VU)	Chris Moors (CVP)	Vic Peuskens (PS)	Peter Berben (PVV)	Louis Vanvelthoven (BSP)	Patrick Dewael (PVV)	Frieda Brepoels (VU)
1991	Hubert Brouns (CVP)	Jaak Gabriëls (VU)	Chris Moors (CVP)	Guy Swennen (PS)	Peter Berben (PVV)	Louis Vanvelthoven (BSP)	Patrick Dewael (PVV)	Karel Pinxten (CVP)
1995	Merged into Hasselt-Tongeren-Maaseik							
