= Katja Verheyen =

Belgian politician

Katja Verheyen (born 29 February 1980) is a Belgian politician active within the N-VA and has been a member of the Flemish Parliament since 2019. She replaced Jan Peumans who opted not to take his seat. Before her term in parliament, she served as chairwoman of the Jong N-VA chapter in Limburg.
