= Hasselt-Tongeren-Maaseik (Flemish Parliament constituency) =

Belgian political subdivision

Hasselt-Tongeren-Maaseik was a constituency used to elect members of the Flemish Parliament between 1995 and 2003.

== Representatives ==
Election	MFP (Party)	MFP (Party)	MFP (Party)	MFP (Party)	MFP (Party)	MFP (Party)	MFP (Party)	MFP (Party)	MFP (Party)	MFP (Party)	MFP (Party)	MFP (Party)	MFP (Party)	MFP (Party)	MFP (Party)
1995	Jaak Gabriels (VLD)	Marino Keulen (VLD)	Freddy Feytons (VLD)	Eddy Schuermans (CVP)	Veerle Heeren (CVP)	Riet Van Cleuvenbergen (CVP)	Georges Beerden (CVP)	Johan Sauwens (VU)	Ludo Sannen (Agalev)	Jean Caubergs (Vlaams Blok)	Peter Vanvelthoven (PS)	Peter Dufaux (PS)	André Kenzeler (PS)	Guy Swennen (PS)	Leo Delcroix (CVP)
1999	Jaak Gabriels (VLD)	Gilbert Van Baelen (VLD)	Guy Sols (VLD)	Eddy Schuermans (CVP)	Veerle Heeren (CVP)	Riet Van Cleuvenbergen (CVP)	Gerald Kindermans (CVP)	Johan Sauwens (VU)	Ludo Sannen (Agalev)	Mathieu Boutsen (Vlaams Blok)	Josée Vercammen (PS)	Chokri Mahassine (PS)	Steve Stevaert (PS)	Jean-Paul Peuskens (PS)	Jean Geraerts (Vlaams Blok)
