= Gaby Colebunders =

Belgian politician (born 1972)

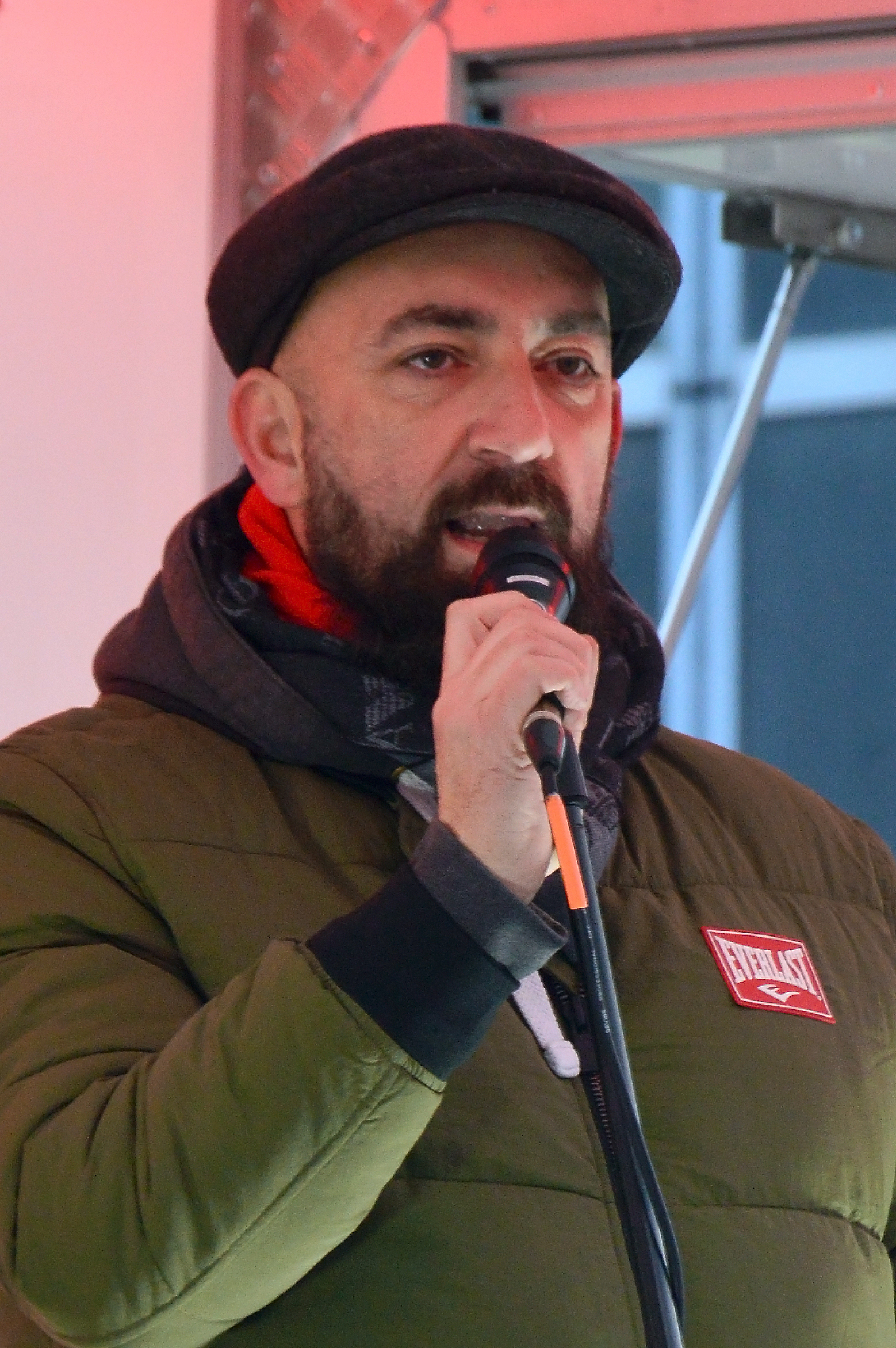
- Colebunders in December 2022

Member of the Flemish Parliament
- Incumbent
- Assumed office 2 July 2024
- Constituency: Limburg

Member of the Chamber of Representatives
- In office 20 June 2019 – 27 May 2024
- Constituency: Liège

Personal details
- Born: 26 December 1972 (age 53) Genk, Belgium
- Party: Workers' Party of Belgium

Gaby Colebunders (born 26 December 1972) is a Belgian trade unionist, politician and member of the Flemish Parliament. A member of the Workers' Party of Belgium, he has represented Limburg since July 2024. He had previously been a member of the Chamber of Representatives from June 2019 to May 2024.

Colebunders was born on 26 December 1972 in Genk. He studied social work at the Centre for Adult Education (CVO) in Brussels. Colebunders, whose mentor was Jef Ulburghs, has been taking part in protests since he was twelve. He became a trade union representative whilst working for a cardboard company. He then worked at the Ford Genk factory for 25 years where he was a trade union representative for the General Labour Federation of Belgium (ABVV). He was at the forefront of trade union opposition to the closure of the factory announced in 2014. A hardliner, he fell out with the ABVV leadership and joined the Confederation of Christian Trade Unions (ACV). He spent a night in police custody after taking part in a union demonstration at Ford Cologne in November 2012. He has also worked for a stone carpet company.

Colebunders contested the 2014 regional election as the Workers' Party of Belgium (PVDA)'s first placed candidate in Limburg but the party failed to win any seats in the constituency. He was elected to the municipal council in Genk at the 2018 local election. He was elected to the Chamber of Representatives at the 2019 federal election. He was elected to the Flemish Parliament at the 2024 regional election.

Colebunders is married and has three children and a grandchild. His daughter Giada died unexpectedly in June 2022 at the age of 21.

Electoral history of Gaby Colebunders
Election	Constituency	Party	Votes	Result
2014 regional	Limburg	Workers' Party of Belgium	4,495	Not elected
2018 local	Genk	Workers' Party of Belgium	682	Elected
2019 federal	Liège	Workers' Party of Belgium	3,524	Elected
2024 regional	Limburg	Workers' Party of Belgium	13,116	Elected
