= Bruges (Flemish Parliament constituency) =

Belgian political subdivision

Bruges was a constituency used to elect members of the Flemish Parliament between 1995 and 2003.

== Representatives ==
Election	MFP (Party)	MFP (Party)	MFP (Party)	MFP (Party)	MFP (Party)
1995	Jacques Devolder (VLD)	Joachim Coens (CVP)	Johan Weyts (CVP)	Jean-Marie Bogaert (VU)	André Van Nieuwkerke (PS)
1999	Jacques Devolder (VLD)	Boudewijn Laloo (CVP)	Johan Weyts (CVP)	Veerle Declercq (Agalev)	André Van Nieuwkerke (PS)
