= Limburg (Flemish Parliament constituency) =

- Flemish Parliament constituency
- Limburg within Belgium

Current constituency
- Created: 2004
- Seats: 16

Limburg is a parliamentary constituency in Belgium used to elect members of the Flemish Parliament since 2004. It corresponds to the province of Limburg.

Article 26 of the Special Law on Institutional Reform of 1980 gives the Flemish Parliament itself the authority to define its electoral districts by decree. The arrondissemental constituencies were replaced by provincial ones by Special Decree of 30 January 2004. This and related provisions were coordinated into the Special Decree of 7 July 2006.

== Representatives ==
Name	Party	From	To
An Christiaens	CD&V	2014	2019
Johan Sauwens	CD&V	2004	2014
Lode Ceyssens	CD&V	2004	2019
Sonja Claes	CD&V	2004	2019
Veerle Heeren	CD&V	2009	2014
Vera Jans	CD&V	2004	2019
Johan Danen	Groen	2014	2019
Lode Vereeck	LDD	2009	2014
Grete Remen	N-VA	2014	2019
Jan Peumans	N-VA	2004	2019
Jelle Engelbosch	N-VA	2014	2019
Jos Lantmeeters	N-VA	2014	2019
Lies Jans	N-VA	2009	2019
Lydia Peeters	Open Vld	2009	2019
Marino Keulen	Open Vld	2014	2019
Marino Keulen	Open Vld	2009	2014
Bert Moyaers	SP.A	2014	2019
Chokri Mahassine	SP.A	2004	2014
Els Robeyns	SP.A	2004	2019
Joke Quintens	SP.A	2009	2014
Joris Vandenbroucke	SP.A	2004	2009
Ludo Sannen	SP.A	2004	2009
Rob Beenders	SP.A	2014	2019
Chris Janssens	VB	2009	2019
John Vrancken	VB	2004	2009
Katleen Martens	VB	2004	2014
Leo Pieters	VB	2004	2009
Linda Vissers	VB	2009	2014
Mathieu Boutsen	VB	2004	2009
Hugo Philtjens	Open Vld	2004	2009
Jaak Gabriëls	Open Vld	2004	2009
Laurence Libert	Open Vld	2004	2009
