= Minister of Public Works (Belgium) =

Belgian political minister

The Public Works ministers in Belgium are the political ministers responsible for public works.

== List of ministers ==
=== Flanders ===
- 1988–1992 Johan Sauwens (VU)
- 1992–1995 Theo Kelchtermans (CVP)
- 1995–1999 Eddy Baldewijns (SP)
- 1999–2003 Steve Stevaert (SP)
- 2003–2004 Gilbert Bossuyt (SP.A)
- 2004–2007 Kris Peeters (CD&V)
- 2007–2014 Hilde Crevits (CD&V)
- 2014–2019 Ben Weyts (N-VA)
- 2019– Lydia Peeters (Open VLD)
