= Speaker of the Flemish Parliament =

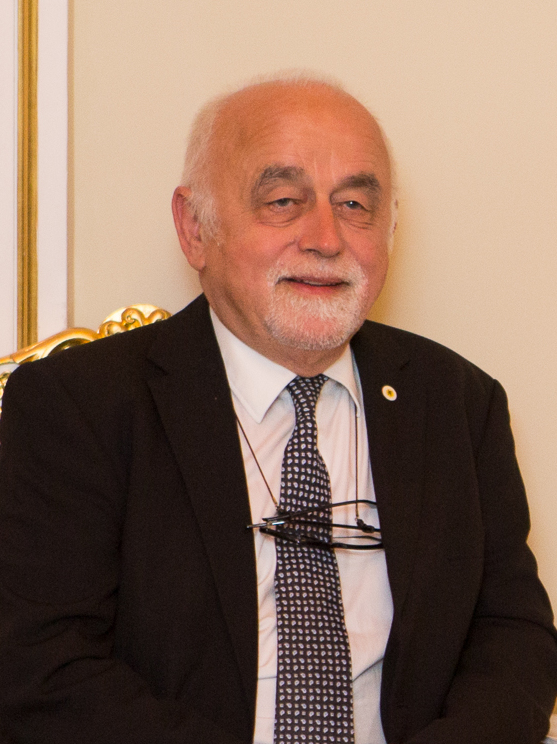
Jan Peumans, speaker 2009–2019

The speaker of the Flemish Parliament (Dutch: Voorzitter van het Vlaams Parlement) is the presiding member of the Flemish Parliament, which is the legislature of Flanders (Belgium). The speaker is elected at the beginning of each parliamentary year, on the fourth Monday in September. The speaker chairs the plenary sessions of the Flemish Parliament and acts as its official representative. The speaker determines whether a certain initiative is admissible and thus can be put to parliament at all. The Flemish ministers take the oath before the Speaker of the Flemish Parliament. Only the head of the Flemish government, the minister-president of Flanders, takes the oath before the King. The speaker also presides over the Bureau and the Extended Bureau of the Flemish Parliament and is assisted by four deputy speakers.

== List of speakers of the Flemish Parliament ==
No.	Name	Entered office	Left office	Legislative term(s)	Party
Cultural Council for the Dutch Cultural Community (Cultuurraad voor de Nederlandse Cultuurgemeenschap)
1.	Robert Vandekerckhove	7 December 1971	9 May 1974		Christian People's Party (CVP)
2.	Jan Bascour	9 May 1974	14 June 1977		Party for Freedom and Progress (PVV)
3.	Maurits Coppieters	14 June 1977	24 April 1979		People's Union (VU)
Flemish Council (Vlaamse Raad)
4.	Rik Boel	24 April 1979	22 December 1981		Belgian Socialist Party (BSP) / Socialist Party (SP)
5.	Jean Pede	22 December 1981	3 December 1985		Party for Freedom and Progress (PVV)
6.	Frans Grootjans	3 December 1985	13 December 1987		Party for Freedom and Progress (PVV)
7.	Jean Pede	2 February 1988	18 October 1988		Party for Freedom and Progress (PVV)
8.	Louis Vanvelthoven	18 October 1988	13 January 1994		Socialist Party (SP)
9.	Eddy Baldewijns	13 January 1994	13 June 1995		Socialist Party (SP)
Flemish Parliament (Vlaams Parlement)
10.	Norbert De Batselier	13 June 1995	12 July 2006	1995–1999; 1999–2004; 2004–2009 (partial)	Socialist Party – Different (sp.a)
11.	Marleen Vanderpoorten	13 July 2006	13 July 2009	2004–2009 (partial)	Flemish Liberals and Democrats (VLD)
12.	Jan Peumans	13 July 2009	26 May 2019	2009–2014; 2014–2019	New Flemish Alliance (N-VA)
13.	Kris Van Dijck	18 June 2019	11 July 2019	2019–2024	New Flemish Alliance (N-VA)
14.	Wilfried Vandaele	13 July 2019	2 October 2019	2019–2024	New Flemish Alliance (N-VA)
15.	Liesbeth Homans	2 October 2019	31 December 2024	2019–2024; 2024–2029	New Flemish Alliance (N-VA)
16.	Freya Van den Bossche	1 January 2025	incumbent	2024–2029	Vooruit

== See also ==
- Flemish Parliament
