= Halle-Vilvoorde (Flemish Parliament constituency) =

Belgian political subdivision

Halle-Vilvoorde was a constituency used to elect members of the Flemish Parliament between 1995 and 2003.

== Representatives ==
Election	MFP (Party)	MFP (Party)	MFP (Party)	MFP (Party)	MFP (Party)	MFP (Party)	MFP (Party)	MFP (Party)	MFP (Party)	MFP (Party)	MFP (Party)
1995	Joris Van Hauthem (Vlaams Blok)	Francis Vermeiren (VLD)	Stefaan Platteau (VLD)	Sonja Van Lindt (VLD)	Michel Doomst (CVP)	Sonja Becq (CVP)	Georges Cardoen (CVP)	Etienne Van Vaerenbergh (VU)	Fred Dielens (PS)	Cecile Verwimp (Agalev)	Christian Van Eyken (UF)
1999	Joris Van Hauthem (Vlaams Blok)	Francis Vermeiren (VLD)	Stefaan Platteau (VLD)	Dominique Guns (VLD)	Eric Van Rompuy (CVP)	Sonja Becq (CVP)	Roland Van Goethem (Vlaams Blok)	Etienne Van Vaerenbergh (VU)	Leo peeters (PS)	Eloi Glorieux (Agalev)	Christian Van Eyken (UF)
