= Grembergen (disambiguation) =

Grembergen is a town in Belgium.

Grembergen may also refer to:

- Paul Van Grembergen (born 1937), Belgian politician; see, e.g., List of members of the Flemish Parliament, 1995–1999#VU (9)
- Wim Van Grembergen (born 1947), Belgian organizational theorist
