= Jean Pede =

Belgian politician

Speaker of Parliament of Flanders
- In office 2 February 1988 – 18 October 1988
- Preceded by: Frans Grootjans
- Succeeded by: Louis Vanvelthoven
- In office 22 December 1981 – 3 December 1985
- Preceded by: Henri Boel
- Succeeded by: Frans Grootjans

Personal details
- Born: 7 January 1927 Oudenaarde, Belgium
- Died: 23 July 2013 (aged 86) Brakel
- Party: Open Flemish Liberals and Democrats

Jean Pede (7 January 1927 – 23 July 2013) was a Belgian liberal politician for the Party for Freedom and Progress.

Professionally Jean Pede was a notary, in a long line of notaries, from his father's as well as from his mother's side.

From February 1985 to October 1988, he was Flemish minister of internal affairs and urban planning.

He was time-long burgomaster of Bottelare (1959–1976) and of Merelbeke (1977–1982 and 1989–1994), and also Provincial Council member of East Flanders.

He was a member of the Belgian Federal Parliament:

- from 1965 to 1971 as a member of the Chamber of Representatives,
- from 1971 tot 1995 as a senator.

These mandates made him automatically a member of the Flemish Council and he was its chair from 1981 to 1985, and again a few months in 1988.

== Sources ==
- Paul VAN MOLLE, La Parlement belge - Het Belgisch Parlement, 1894-1972, Antwerpen, 1972
- Belgische Senaat, Biografisch Handboek, Brussel, 1987, p. 371-373.
- Clair YSEBAERT, Politiek Zakboekje met Politicowie. Decisionmakers '93-'94, Zaventem, Kluwer Editorial, 1993, p. 284-285.
- Nicole LEHOUCQ en Tony VALCKE, De fonteinen van de Oranjeberg, Politiek-institutionele geschiedenis van de provincie Oost-Vlaanderen van 1830 tot nu. Deel 2 : Biografisch repertorium, Gent, Stichting Mens en Cultuur, 1997, p. 314-315.
- Jean Pede. Ere-senator, 29/09/1996. Viering, s.l., s.n., 1996, s.p.
- Levensloop Ere-senator Jean Pede, Viering 29 September 1996, Merelbeke, Gemeentehallen, 1996, 7 p.

Political offices
Preceded by Henri Boel	Speaker of Parliament of Flanders; 1981–1985	Succeeded by Frans Grootjans
Preceded by Frans Grootjans	Speaker of Parliament of Flanders; 1988	Succeeded by Louis Vanvelthoven
