= Bossuyt =

Bossuyt may refer to:

- Anneleen Van Bossuyt (born 1980), a Belgian Member of the European Parliament
- Gilbert Bossuyt (born 1947), a Belgian politician
- Marc Bossuyt (born 1944), a member of the Permanent Court of Arbitration in The Hague
- Tine Bossuyt (born 1980), a retired Belgian swimmer
