= Resolutions of the Flemish Parliament of 1999 =

Event in Belgian politics

The resolutions of the Flemish Parliament of 1999 were five resolutions passed by the Flemish Parliament on 3 March 1999 and which outlined the Flemish demands for future state reforms. They are also commonly referred to as the Flemish resolutions.

The five resolutions of the Flemish Parliament of 3 March 1999 are:

- The resolution regarding the general principles and objectives of Flanders with regard to next state reform;
- The resolution regarding the expansion of the financial and fiscal autonomy in the next state reform;
- The resolution regarding Brussels in the next state reform;
- The resolution regarding the establishment of a more coherent division of competences in the next state reform; and
- The resolution regarding a number of specific points of attention for the next state reform.

The first resolution was adopted with 98 votes in favour, 1 vote against and 7 abstentions. The second resolution was adopted with 92 votes in favour, 1 vote against and 13 abstentions. The third resolution was adopted with 95 votes in favour, 1 vote against and 10 abstentions. The fourth resolution was adopted with 70 votes in favour, 1 vote against and 35 abstentions. The fifth and last resolution was adopted with 98 votes in favour, 1 vote against and 7 abstentions. The only Member of the Flemish Parliament that voted against was Christian Van Eyken of the Union des Francophones, an electoral list of French-speaking inhabitants of Flanders. 106 of the 124 Members of the Flemish Parliament were present during the vote, the members of the Vlaams Blok (presently Vlaams Belang) fraction left the plenary session prior to the vote.

The resolutions were passed a few months before the June 1999 elections, which were only the second direct elections for the Flemish Parliament.

The Flemish Government Agreement of 2004, which outlined the plans of the Flemish Government for the period 2004–2009, states that the parties in the government coalition (Christian Democratic and Flemish/New-Flemish Alliance, Open Flemish Liberals and Democrats, and Socialist Party – Different-Spirit) agree that these resolutions should be realised.

== See also ==
- Flemish Parliament
