= List of members of the Flemish Parliament, 1999–2004 =

Flemish Parliament, 1999–2004

Overview
- Legislative body: Flemish Parliament
- Meeting place: Brussels
- Term: July 1999 – May 2004
- Election: 13 June 1999
- Government: Until July 2003: Dewael Govt. From July 2003: Somers Govt.
- Members: 124
- Speaker: Norbert De Batselier (SP)

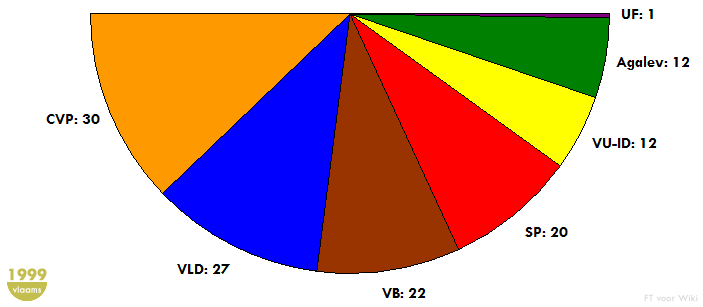
Inaugural seat division of the Flemish Parliament in 1999

This is a list of members of the Flemish Parliament between 1999 and 2004, following the direct elections of 1999.

== Results ==
Party	Votes	%	Seats			
Party	Votes	%	Flanders	Brussels	Total	+/-
Christian People's Party	857,732	22.09	28	2	30	-7
Flemish Liberals and Democrats	855,867	22.04	27	–	27	–
Flemish Block	603,345	15.54	20	2	22	+5
Flemish Socialist Party	582,419	15.00	19	1	20	-6
Agalev	451,361	11.62	12	–	12	+5
People's Union	359,226	9.25	11	1	12	+3
Vivant	77,864	2.01	–	–	–	–
Union of Francophones	36,683	0.94	1	–	1	–
PVDA-AE	24,162	0.62	–	–	–	–
PNPB	12,489	0.32	–	–	–	–
W.O.W.	8,043	0.21	–	–	–	–
UDDU	4,150	0.11	–	–	–	–
Solide	2,464	0.06	–	–	–	–
A	2,331	0.06	–	–	–	–
W.I.T.	1,659	0.04	–	–	–	–
LEEF	1,621	0.04	–	–	–	–
V.N.P.	727	0.02	–	–	–	–
Vrijheid, Intimiteit, Thuis, Arbeid en Liefde	563	0.01	–	–	–	–
MLINKS	478	0.01	–	–	–	–
Total	3,883,184	100.00	118	6	124	0
Valid votes	3,883,184	94.21				
Invalid/blank votes	238,749	5.79				
Total votes	4,121,933	100.00				
Registered voters/turnout	4,471,695	92.18				
Source: Belgian Elections

== By party ==
=== Agalev (1999–2003) → Groen! (2003–2004) ===
Representative	Electoral district
Magda Aelvoet	Leuven
Veerle Declercq	Bruges
Vera Dua	Ghent–Eeklo
Jos Geysels	Mechelen–Turnhout
Eloi Glorieux	Halle–Vilvoorde
Dirk Holemans	Ghent–Eeklo
Johan Malcorps	Antwerp
Ludo Sannen	Limburg
Frans Ramon	Kortrijk–Roeselare–Tielt
Jos Stassen	Sint-Niklaas–Dendermonde
Ria Van Den Heuvel	Antwerp
Jo Vermeulen	Antwerp

== Changes during the legislature ==
=== Representatives who resigned ===
Name	Party	Date of resignation	Replacement	Notes
Magda Aelvoet	Agalev/Groen!	12 July 1999		Became minister in Verhofstadt I
Vera Dua	Agalev/Groen!	13 July 1999	Isabel Vertriest	Became Flemish minister in Dewael I
Tuur Van Wallendael	SP.A	24 January 2001	Peter De Ridder	
Paul Van Grembergen	VU-ID	15 May 2001	Jan Roegiers	
Jacques Laverge	VLD	5 November 2002	Karlos Callens	
Herman De Loor	SP.A	15 December 2002	Gracienne Van Nieuwenborgh	
Ludo Sannen	Agalev/Groen!	26 May 2003	Flor Ory	
Isabel Vertriest	Agalev/Groen!	26 May 2003	Vera Dua	
Marino Keulen	VLD	10 June 2003	Guy Sols	
Rufin Grijp	SP.A	11 June 2003	Anne Van Asbroeck	
Karel De Gucht	VLD	26 June 2003	Erna Van Wauwe	
Anne Van Asbroeck	SP.A	19 November 2003	Yamila Idrissi	
