= Jan Béghin =

Belgian politician (1949–2022)

Member of the Parliament of the Brussels-Capital Region
- In office 1989–2009

Member of the Flemish Parliament
- In office 1997–1999

Personal details
- Born: 7 September 1949 Ypres, Belgium
- Died: 3 May 2022 (aged 72) Aalst, Belgium
- Party: CD&V (1971–2004); SP.A (since 2004)
- Education: KU Leuven

Jan Béghin (7 September 1949 – 3 May 2022) was a Belgian politician for the Flemish Socialist Party (SP.A) and the Christian Democratic and Flemish (CD&V) party.

== Biography ==
Béghin was the son of a Francophone father and a Dutch-speaking mother and spent his childhood in Ganshoren. He attended secondary school at the Heilig-Hartcollege before obtaining a master's degree in mathematics and in economic sciences from KU Leuven.

In 1971, Béghin was elected to the municipal council of Ganshoren as a member of CD&V. He was schepen of public works and Dutch culture from 1977 to 2000. He left the municipal council in 2005. From 1972 to 1989, he was a member of the Dutch Commission for the Culture of the Brussels Agglomeration, of which he was vice-president from 1979 to 1988, and chairman from 1988 to 1989. From 1982 to 1988, he was also director of the Contact- en Cultuurcentrum Brussel.

On 12 July 1989, Béghin became a member of the newly formed Parliament of the Brussels-Capital Region. From 1989 to 2009, he was also a member of the Assembly of the Flemish Community Commission. Through his mandate in the Brussels-Capital Region Parliament, he also served in the Flemish Parliament from 1997 to 1999.

In 2004, Béghin switched to the SP.A due to the coalition between CD&V and the New Flemish Alliance, the latter of which he vehemently opposed. In 2009, he retired from the Parliament of the Brussels-Capital Region.

Jan Béghin died in Aalst on 3 May 2022, at the age of 72.
