= Joris Helleputte =

Belgian politician and architect (1852–1925)

Joris or Georges Helleputte (1852–1925) was a Belgian politician and Gothic Revival architect. He served as Minister of Agriculture and Public Works and Minister of Railways, Post and Telegraphs.

== Early life and education ==
Helleputte was born to a Catholic family. His father was Petrus Helleputte and his mother was Florentine Detemmerman.

He graduated from Ghent University as a bridge and road engineer.

== Architectural career ==
Helleputte became a professor of architecture at the Catholic University of Leuven, teaching architects like Raymond Lemaire and Raphaël Verwilghen. He collaborated on projects with Theodoor Van Dormael.

He founded the Leuven Guild of Craft and Commerce, co-founded the Boerenbond in 1890, and helped found the Belgian Volksbond. He was also a member of the Royal Commission for Monuments.

== Political career ==
Helleputte represented Maaseik in the Chamber of Representatives from 1889 until 1924. From 1901 until 1910, he was Minister of Railways, Post and Telegraphs. He then became Minister of Agriculture and Public Works from 1910 until 1918.

He accompanied the Belgian government in exile to Le Havre in 1914.

== Personal life ==
In 1882, Helleputte married Louise Schollaert, the sister of Prime Minister Frans Schollaert; they had no children.

Helleputte's sister, Rosalie, married the Belgian architect Louis Cloquet.
