= Lydia Maximus =

Belgian politician (1938–2026)

Member of the Senate of Belgium
- In office 8 November 1990 – 16 January 1999

Member of the Flemish Council/Flemish Parliament
- In office 13 November 1990 – 16 January 1999

Personal details
- Born: 5 December 1938 Boom, Belgium
- Died: 3 July 2026 (aged 87) Mechelen, Belgium
- Party: SP
- Occupation: Civil servant

Lydia Maximus (5 December 1938 – 3 July 2026) was a Belgian politician. A member of the Socialist Party, she served in the Senate from 1990 to 1999 and in the Flemish Council/Flemish Parliament from 1990 to 1999.

Maximus died in Mechelen on 3 July 2026, at the age of 87.
