= Maurits Coppieters =

Belgian politician

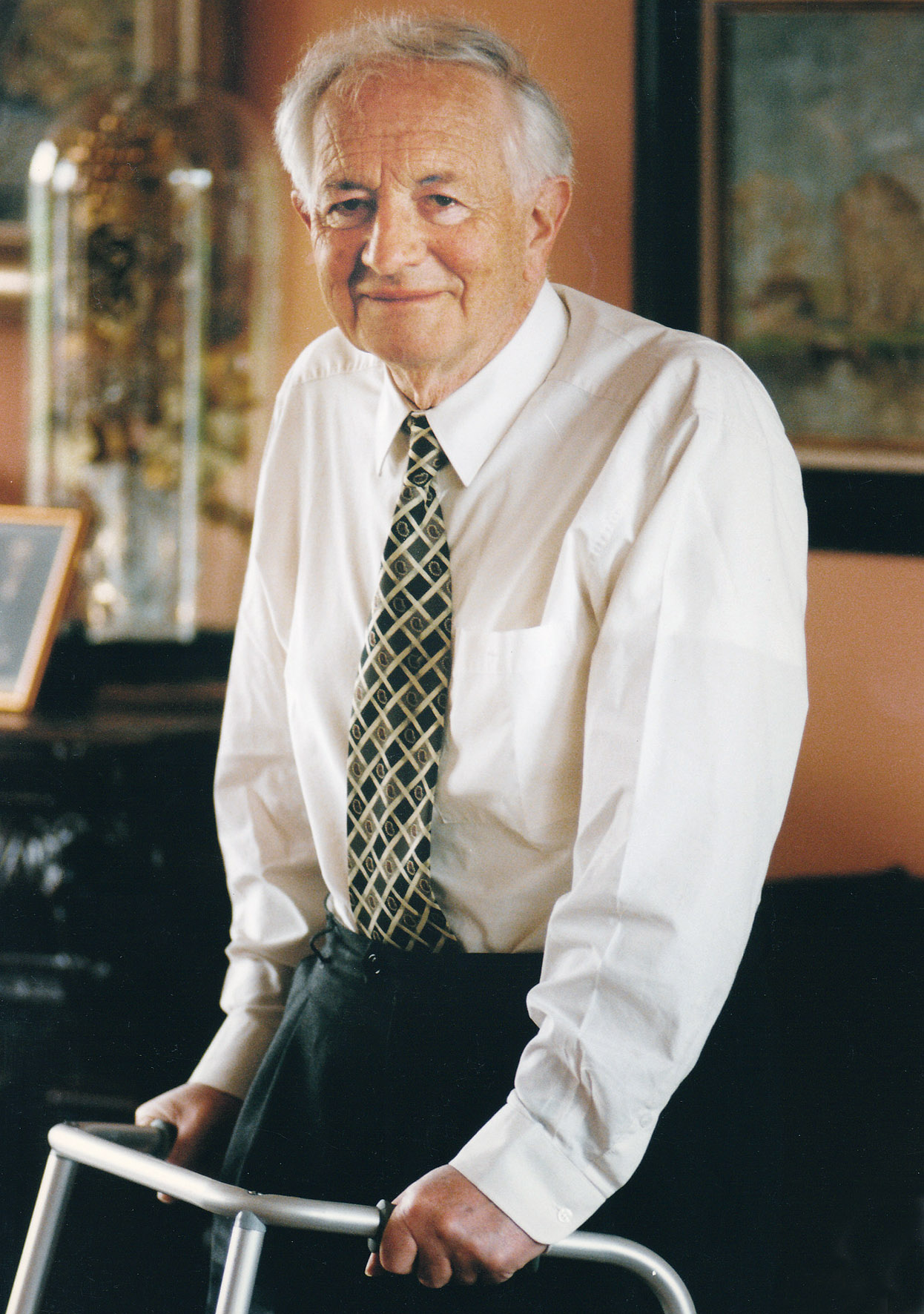

Speaker of Parliament of Flanders
- In office 14 June 1977 – 24 April 1979
- Preceded by: Jan Bascour
- Succeeded by: Rik Boel

Personal details
- Born: 14 May 1920; Sint-Niklaas, Belgium
- Died: 11 November 2005 (aged 85); Deinze, Belgium
- Political party: People's Union

Maurits Coppieters (14 May 1920 – 11 November 2005), Flemish politician for the Volksunie, member of the Belgian Chamber (1965–1971), the Belgian Senate (1971–1979) and the European Parliament (1979–1981).

The Fleming Maurits Coppieters studied history and later became a Doctor of Laws and obtained a master's degree in East European studies. During the Second World War, he refused to work for the German occupier. After many years as a teacher, he worked as a lawyer for a while. He was one of the people who re-established the Vlaamse Volksbeweging (Flemish People's Movement), of which he was the President from 1957 to 1963.

== Career ==
Coppieters' political career began when he became a member of the Volksunie (VU) which was formed in 1954. With the exception of two years, Coppieters was a member of the Town Council during the period between 1964 and 1983. He was also elected as a member of the Chamber (1965–1971) and as a member of the Senate (1971–1979). At the same time, Coppieters was the President of the VU in the newly formed "Cultuurraad voor de Nederlandstalige Cultuurgemeenschap" (Cultural Council for the Dutch-speaking Community, later the Flemish Parliament), of which he became the President when the VU formed part of the government. In 1979, Coppieters was elected during the first direct elections of the European Parliament.

As a regionalist, he became a member of the Group for Technical Coordination and Defence of Independent Groupings and Members in the European Parliament (TCDI). Among other things, he made a name for himself when he championed the cause of the Corsicans. In the meantime, Coppieters also played a pioneering role in the formation of the European Free Alliance, of which he became the Honorary President and in whose expansion he continued to play a role, even after he said farewell to active politics in 1981. In that year, Jaak Vandemeulebroucke succeeded him in the European Parliament. In 1996, Coppieters joined forces with De Batselier to promote "Het Sienjaal", a text which was written with a view to achieving political revival beyond the party boundaries. Coppieters died on 11 November 2005.

Among other things, Coppieters was the author of: Het jaar van de Klaproos; Ik was een Europees Parlementslid; De Schone en het Beest. He is Honorary member of the EFA.

His biography consisting of a number of articles by people who've known Maurice in his different functions was presented in the Flemish Parliament on 10 November 2009, 4 years after his death. It bears the title "Het Laatste Jaar van de Klaproos".

Political offices
Preceded by Jan Bascour	Speaker of Parliament of Flanders; 1977–1979	Succeeded by Henri Boel
