= Frans Grootjans =

Belgian politician (1922–1999)

Speaker of Parliament of Flanders
- In office 3 December 1985 – 2 February 1988
- Preceded by: Jean Pede
- Succeeded by: Jean Pede

Personal details
- Born: 24 January 1922 Wilrijk, Belgium
- Died: 20 February 1999 (aged 77) Antwerp, Belgium
- Party: Open Flemish Liberals and Democrats

Frans Edward Elisabeth Grootjans (24 January 1922 – 20 February 1999), was a Belgian politician and minister for the PVV.

Grootjans was born at Wilrijk. He became a licentiate in the trade and consular sciences and was chief editor and director of the newspaper De Nieuwe Gazet. He was a Municipal Council member (1971–1986) in Antwerp and a member of parliament (1954–1987) for the district Antwerp for the PVV. Grootjans was President of the PVV (1973–1977 and 1981–1982). He was minister of national education (1966–1968) and of finances and medium-sized business (1985). He was also President of the Flemish Council (1985–1987). He remained in Antwerp for the rest of his life.

== Honours ==
- Grand officer in the Order of Leopold.
- Knight grand Cross in the Order of Leopold II.

== Sources ==
- Presidents of the Belgian liberal party
- Terugblik in zorg en hoop. Frans Grootjans aan het woord, publication of the Willemsfonds and the Liberaal Vlaams Verbond with the support of the Liberaal Archief, 1990.

Political offices
Preceded by Jean Pede	Speaker of Parliament of Flanders; 1985–1988	Succeeded by Jean Pede
