= Elke Roex =

Belgian politician

- Elke Roex
- Born: 29 June 1974 (age 51); Uccle, Belgium
- Occupation: politician

Elke Roex (born 29 June 1974) is a Belgian, Flemish politician and member of the Flemish Parliament for the Socialist Party – Different (Dutch: Socialistische Partij – Anders) (SP.A) since 2004 and a member of the City Council of Anderlecht. She lives in the architecturally unique district La Roue/Het Rad.
