= Wilfried Vandaele =

Belgian politician

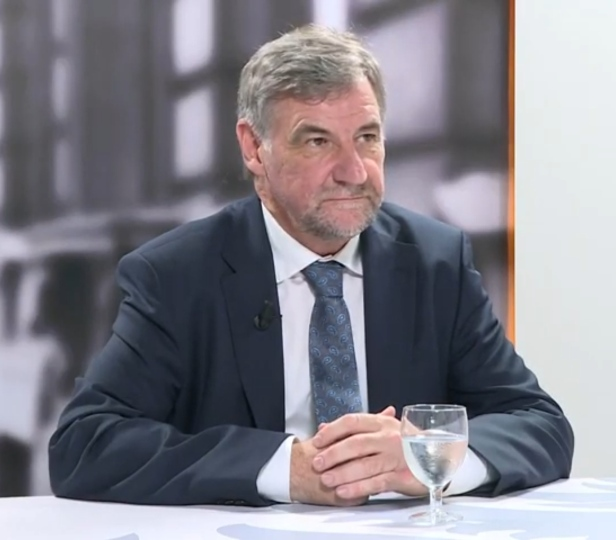

Speaker of the Flemish Parliament
- In office 13 July 2019 – 2 October 2019
- Preceded by: Kris Van Dijck
- Succeeded by: Liesbeth Homans

Member of the Flemish Parliament
- Incumbent
- Assumed office 7 June 2009

Senator for the Flemish community
- In office 10 January 2013 – 31 December 2018

Personal details
- Born: 5 June 1959 (age 66) Bruges, West Flanders
- Party: N-VA
- Website: http://www.n-va.be/cv/wilfried-vandaele

Wilfried Vandaele (born 5 June 1959 in Bruges) is a Belgian politician and is affiliated to the N-VA. He has been a member of the Flemish Parliament since 2009 and has served as its speaker between 13 July and 2 October 2019. He is also the current mayor of his home town De Haan.

== Career ==
Vandaele was elected as a member of the Flemish Parliament in 2009. In January 2013 he succeeded party leader Bart De Wever as a senator for the Flemish community. As a senator he was a member of the committees for home affairs and administrative affairs. Since 2015 he is an alternate member of the European Alliance Group at the European Committee of the Regions. From 13 July 2019 he was Speaker of the Flemish Parliament until his replacement by Liesbeth Homans on 2 October 2019. He subsequently became the leader of the N-VA parliamentary group, succeeding Matthias Diependaele who was appointed as a minister in the new Jambon government.

Vandaele has been a member of the city council of De Haan since 1 January 1989. He served as alderman (January 1, 2007 – December 31, 2012) and has been the mayor of the town since 1 January 2019. Upon becoming mayor, he resigned from his position as senator, as is legally required.
