= Maaseik (Chamber of Representatives constituency) =

Belgian political subdivision

Maaseik was a constituency used to elect a single member of the Belgian Chamber of Representatives between 1839 and 1900. It replaced Roermond as a constituency for the province of Limburg when that city passed to the Kingdom of the Netherlands as a result of the Treaty of London. The first member from Maaseik had been elected from Roermond in 1837.

== Representatives ==
Election	Representative (Party)
1837	Jean Scheyven (Catholic)
1841	Hubert Huveners (Catholic)
1845	Hubert Huveners (Catholic)
1848	Charles Vilain XIIII (Catholic)
1852	Charles Vilain XIIII (Catholic)
1856	Charles Vilain XIIII (Catholic)
1857	Charles Vilain XIIII (Catholic)
1861	Charles Vilain XIIII (Catholic)
1864	Charles Vilain XIIII (Catholic)
1868	Charles Vilain XIIII (Catholic)
1870	Charles Vilain XIIII (Catholic)
1874	Charles Vilain XIIII (Catholic)
1878	Prosper Cornesse (Catholic)
1882	Prosper Cornesse (Catholic)
1886	Joris Helleputte (Catholic)
1890	Joris Helleputte (Catholic)
1892	Joris Helleputte (Catholic)
1894	Joris Helleputte (Catholic)
1898	Joris Helleputte (Catholic)
1900	Merged into Tongeren-Maaseik
