= Tongeren (Chamber of Representatives constituency) =

Belgian political subdivision

Tongeren was a constituency used to elect a single member of the Belgian Chamber of Representatives between 1839 and 1900. It replaced the Maastricht constituency after the Belgian claim to Maastricht was relinquished to the Netherlands under the Treaty of London (1839). In the Belgian parliament, two members elected for Maastricht in 1837 simply continued to sit as members for Tongeren.

== Representatives ==
Election	Representative (Party)	Representative (Party)
1837	Henri Simons (Catholic)	Maximilien de Renesse (Liberal)
1841	Henri Simons (Catholic)	Maximilien de Renesse (Liberal)
1845	Henri Simons (Catholic)	Jean Raikem (Catholic)
1848	Louis Julliot (Catholic)	Maximilien de Renesse (Liberal)
1852	Louis Julliot (Catholic)	Maximilien de Renesse (Liberal)
1856	Louis Julliot (Catholic)	Maximilien de Renesse (Liberal)
1857	Louis Julliot (Catholic)	Maximilien de Renesse (Liberal)
1861	Louis Julliot (Catholic)	Maximilien de Renesse (Liberal)
1864	Louis Julliot (Catholic)	Gustave de Woelmont (Catholic)
1868	Louis Julliot (Catholic)	François de Borchgrave d'Altena (Catholic)
1870	Louis Julliot (Catholic)	François de Borchgrave d'Altena (Catholic)
1874	Louis Julliot (Catholic)	François de Borchgrave d'Altena (Catholic)
1878	Oscar de Schaetzen (Catholic)	François de Borchgrave d'Altena (Catholic)
1882	Oscar de Schaetzen (Catholic)	François Meyers (Catholic)
1886	Oscar de Schaetzen (Catholic)	François Meyers (Catholic)
1890	Oscar de Schaetzen (Catholic)	François Meyers (Catholic)
1892	Oscar de Schaetzen (Catholic)	François Meyers (Catholic)
1894	Camille Desmaisières (Catholic)	Joseph Indekeu (Catholic)
1898	Camille Desmaisières (Catholic)	Henri Gielen (Catholic)
1900	Merged into Tongeren-Maaseik	
