= Eddy Baldewijns =

Belgian politician (born 1945)

Minister of Education and Civil Service Affairs
- In office 26 September 1998 – 13 July 1999
- President: Luc Van den Brande
- Preceded by: Luc Van den Bossche
- Succeeded by: Marleen Vanderpoorten

Minister of Public Works, Transport and Spatial Planning
- In office 20 June 1995 – 26 September 1998
- President: Luc Van den Brande
- Preceded by: Theo Kelchtermans
- Succeeded by: Steve Stevaert

Chairman of the Flemish Council
- In office 13 January 1994 – 13 June 1995
- Preceded by: Louis Vanvelthoven
- Succeeded by: Norbert De Batselier

Member of the Chamber of Representatives
- In office 13 June 1999 – 1 December 1999
- Succeeded by: Ludwig Vandenhove
- Constituency: Hasselt-Tongeren-Maaseik
- In office 17 April 1977 – 21 May 1995
- Constituency: Hasselt

Member of the Flemish Parliament
- In office 21 May 1995 – 4 July 1995
- Constituency: Hasselt-Tongeren-Maaseik

Member of the Flemish Council
- In office 21 October 1980 – 20 May 1995

Member of the Cultural Council for the Dutch Cultural Community
- In office 12 May 1977 – 20 October 1980

Personal details
- Born: 22 April 1945 (age 81) Borlo, Belgium
- Party: Socialist Party Different

Edouard S. L. L. J. Baldewijns (born 22 April 1945) is a Belgian politician, member of the Chamber of Representatives and Flemish Government minister. A member of the Belgian Socialist Party and its successor the Flemish Socialist Party, he represented Hasselt from April 1977 to May 1995 and Hasselt-Tongeren-Maaseik from June 1999 to December 1999. He was the Flemish Minister of Public Works, Transport and Spatial Planning from June 1995 to September 1998 and Minister of Education and Civil Service Affairs from September 1998 to July 1999. He was also a member of the Flemish Parliament and its predecessors, the Flemish Council and the Cultural Council for the Dutch Cultural Community, from May 1977 to July 1995.

== Early life ==
Baldewijns was born on 22 April 1945 in Borlo into a farming family. In 1966 he graduated from the Provinciale Normaalschool teaching college in Tienen with a major in French and history. He taught French at the Rijksnormaalschool in Hasselt from 1967 to 1977.

== Politics ==
Baldewijns was a member of the Belgian Socialist Party and its successors, the Flemish Socialist Party and Socialist Party Different. He was chairman of the party's local branch in Gingelom from 1976 to 1988 and chairman of the cantonal branch in Sint-Truiden from 1977 to 1994. He was also a vice-chairman of the provincial branch in Limburg and a member of the party's national executive for many years.

Baldewijns was a member of the municipal council in Borlo from 1977 to 1976 and its successor Gingelom from 1977 to 2004. He was mayor of Gingelom from 1989 to 2004. He was also a member of the provincial council in Limburg from March 1974 to April 1977.

Baldewijns was a member of the Dutch Cultural Community and its successors, the Flemish Council and the Flemish Parliament, from May 1977 to July 1995. With his background, Baldewijns became the Flemish socialists education expert. He was one of the key figures behind the establishment of the Autonomous Council for Community Education (Autonome Raad van het Gemeenschapsonderwijs, ARGO). He was a member of the Flemish Council's education committee for many years. He was Chairman of the Flemish Council (Voorzitter Vlaamse Raad) from January 1994 to June 1995.

Following the first direct election to the Flemish Parliament in 1995, Baldewijns was appointed Minister of Public Works, Transport and Spatial Planning in the government of Minister-President Luc Van den Brande. As minister, Baldewijns put an end to the toleration of building regulation violations and had several illegally built houses demolished. He also replaced the ad-hoc changes to the regional plans by decree and instead drew up the Spatial Structure Plan Flanders (RSV) in 1997. In September 1998 he was promoted to Minister of Education and Civil Service Affairs.

Baldewijns represented Hasselt in the Chamber of Representatives from April 1977 to May 1995 and Hasselt-Tongeren-Maaseik from June 1999 to December 1999. He was an alternate member of the Benelux Interparliamentary Consultative Council from November 1999 to March 2000. In December 1999 he was appointed Deputy Secretary-General for Benelux.

Baldewijns was chairman of Council for Community Education (RAGO) from 2008 to 2018. He is a Grand Officer in the Order of Leopold and has a Civil Medal 1st class. The Eddy Baldewijns Centre for Reading, Information and Multimedia (Centrum voor Lectuur, Informatie en Multimedia Eddy Baldewijns) in Gingelom is named after Baldewijns.
