= Luc Van den Bossche =

Belgian politician (born 1947)

Member of Parliament (Chamber of Representatives)
- In office 1981–1995
- In office 1999–2003

Minister of Civil Service
- In office 1999–2003
- Preceded by: André Flahaut
- Succeeded by: Marie Arena

Vice-Prime Minister
- In office 1998–1999
- Preceded by: Louis Tobback
- Succeeded by: Johan Van de Lanotte

Flemish Minister of Civil Service
- In office 1992–1995
- Preceded by: Theo Kelchtermans
- Succeeded by: Eddy Baldewijns

Flemish Minister of Education
- In office 1992–1998
- Preceded by: Daniël Coens
- Succeeded by: Eddy Baldewijns

Personal details
- Born: 16 September 1947 (age 79) Aalst, Belgium
- Party: SP/SP.A
- Education: University of Ghent
- Occupation: Politician

Luc Van den Bossche (born 16 September 1947, in Aalst, Belgium) is a Belgian socialist politician and father of Freya Van den Bossche.

He graduated as a doctor in law at the University of Ghent in 1970. Luc Van den Bossche was a Member of Parliament for a number of years and cabinet member in several federal and regional governments in Belgium. Currently he is chairman of the Brussels International Airport Company and of the Associatie UGent, as well as board member in several companies. He is a member of the advisory board of the Itinera Institute think-tank.

== Sources ==
- Luc Van den Bossche (Dutch)
- Luc Van den Bossche (Dutch)
- Luc Van den Bossche blijft (voorlopig) Biac leiden (Dutch)
