= Kris Van Dijck =

Belgian politician

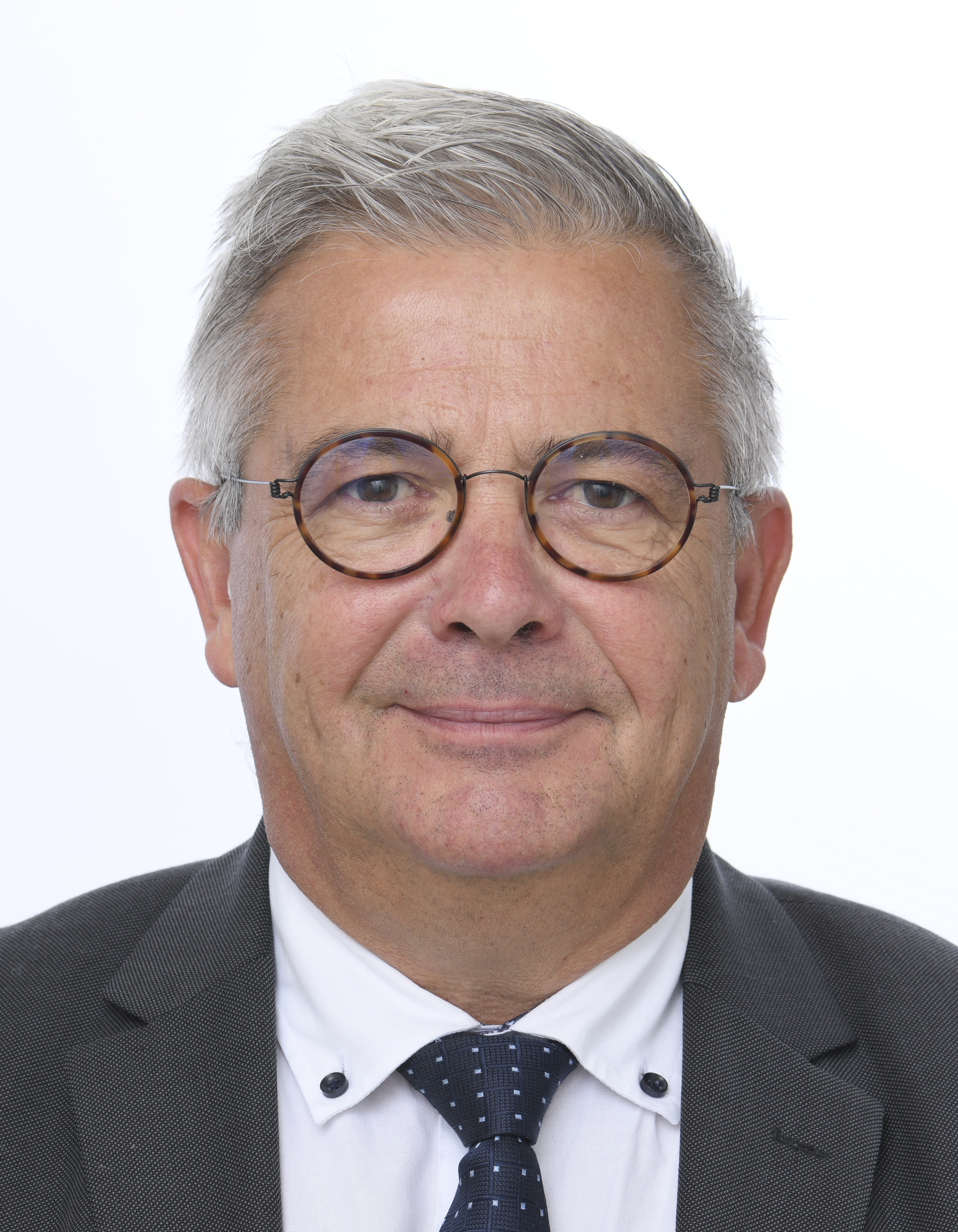
- Official portrait, 2024

Member of the European Parliament

Speaker of the Flemish Parliament
- In office 18 June 2019 – 11 July 2019
- Preceded by: Jan Peumans
- Succeeded by: Wilfried Vandaele

Member of the Flemish Parliament
- Incumbent
- Assumed office 13 June 1995

Personal details
- Born: 2 October 1963 (age 63) Turnhout, Antwerp
- Party: N-VA
- Website: https://www.krisvandijck.be/

Kris Van Dijck (born 2 October 1963 in Turnhout) is a Belgian politician affiliated to the New Flemish Alliance (N-VA). He has been a Member of the European Parliament since July 2024 and is the mayor of Dessel. Previously, he served in the Flemish Parliament for 29 years, from 1995 to 2024.

== Early life and education ==
Born in Turnhout, Van Dijck grew up in Dessel. He trained as a primary school teacher in Wijnegem and worked in education before entering full-time politics in 1995.

== Political career ==
=== Early career and N-VA ===
Van Dijck began his political career with the People's Union (Volksunie), becoming an alderman in Dessel in 1989. Following the establishment of the N-VA in 2001, he became its first secretary-general.

=== Flemish Parliament (1995–2024) ===
Van Dijck served continuously in the Flemish Parliament from 1995 until 2024. He was parliamentary group leader of the N-VA from 2004 to 2006 and from 2009 to 2012.

His parliamentary work focused on education, local government, public administration and sport. In 2019, he briefly served as Speaker of the Flemish Parliament. He subsequently chaired the Committee on Internal Administration, Equal Opportunities and Civic Integration.

In March 2025, he was granted the honorary title of former Speaker of the Flemish Parliament.

=== European Parliament (2024–present) ===
Van Dijck was elected to the European Parliament in June 2024 and took office on 16 July 2024. He represents the N-VA within the European Conservatives and Reformists (ECR) Group.

He is a full member of the Committee on Industry, Research and Energy (ITRE) and a substitute member of the Committee on International Trade (INTA) and the Committee on Transport and Tourism (TRAN).

He also serves as Vice-Chair of the Delegation for relations with Australia and New Zealand.

His parliamentary activities include nuclear energy, industrial competitiveness, international trade, energy security and transport policy.

=== Mayor of Dessel ===
Van Dijck first served as mayor of Dessel from 1995 to 2000 and returned to office in 2007.

The N-VA secured an absolute majority in Dessel in the municipal elections of 2006, 2012 and 2018. Following the 2024 elections, Van Dijck continued as mayor, leading a joint N-VA/CD&V administration for the 2025–2030 term.

He has also been involved in local consultation concerning radioactive waste management. He helped establish the STORA partnership in 1999 and became chairman of its governing body in 2022.

=== Controversies ===
In July 2019, Van Dijck resigned as Speaker of the Flemish Parliament following a drink-driving incident and media allegations concerning his intervention in a social benefits case.

Van Dijck denied the allegations of fraud. In October 2019, the Flemish Parliament's Deontological Committee unanimously dismissed a complaint against him. The Belgian Council for Journalism subsequently partially upheld his complaint against P-Magazine, finding that the publication had created an insufficiently substantiated impression of fraud.
