= Christian Van Eyken =

Belgian politician (born 1954)

- Born: 16 August 1954 (age 72); Etterbeek, Belgium
- Education: Université libre de Bruxelles
- Office: Member of the Flemish Parliament 1995-2019
- Political party: DéFI 1995-2016; Independent 2016-2019
- Other political affiliations: Union des Francophones
- Criminal charges: Murder
- Criminal penalty: 20 years in prison
- Spouse: Sylvie Boigelot

Christian B. S. Van Eyken (born 16 August 1954 in Etterbeek) is a former Belgian politician who represented the Union des Francophones in the Flemish Parliament from 1995 to 2019. He was convicted of murder in 2019, with the court of appeal upholding the verdict in 2021.

== Biography ==
Van Eyken was born in the town of Etterbeek in the Brussels Capital Region in 1954. He studied at the Athénée royal de Bruxelles and the Université libre de Bruxelles, where he majored in German studies. Upon graduation in 1978, Van Eyken worked as a teacher and later as a translator for the Brussels government.

He began his political career in 1983, when he became a community councillor in the town of Linkebeek, a position he held until 2006. In Linkebeek, he would serve as both the Échevin and the Mayor.

In the first direct elections to the Flemish Parliament in 1995, Van Eyken was elected to the regional parliament as a member of the Union des Francophones for the Halle-Vilvoorde constituency. He did not stand for re-election in the 2019 Belgian regional elections.

Between 2007 and 2012, Van Eyken served as a local councillor and member of the police council for the town of Tervuren.

== Murder of Marc Dellea ==
On 8 July 2014, a coffee trader named Marc Dellea was found dead in his bed at the age of 45. His ex-wife, Sylvia Boigelot, called the authorities following his death. A family doctor concluded that Dellea's death was by natural causes, but two days later a medical examiner noticed a wound on an earlobe and found a bullet in his brain, fired (according to ballistics experts) by a small handgun. Surveillance footage from security cameras installed in the couple's home found that Sylvia Boigelot and Christian Van Eyken had entered the building on the evening of 6 July shortly before Dellea, and Dellea was the only one who did not leave the house.

Following a lengthy investigation, Boigelot was arrested in October 2015. Van Eyken was arrested and remanded into custody in January 2016 after his parliamentary immunity was lifted, but released a day later as the examining magistrate had omitted to sign the arrest warrant. Both Boigelot and Van Eyken protested their innocence. In an interview with Le Soir, Olivier Maingain, leader of the Francophone party DéFI, said that Van Eyken had been suspended since 6 January 2016 concurrently with his parliamentary immunity being lifted. Boigelot and Van Eyken married in September 2018.

Van Eyken and Boigelot went on trial in June 2019, after the case was postponed in 2017 for procedural reasons and again in 2018 when the couple were suspected of sabotaging evidence. On 3 September 2019, they were found guilty of the murder of Marc Dellea and sentenced to 23 years in prison but remained free pending an appeal. In February 2021, the court of appeal upheld the verdict and increased the sentence to 27 years in prison. The couple were allowed a further appeal against the sentence and on 27 April 2022 Van Eyken was sentenced to 20 years and Boigelot to 22 years imprisonment.

== Awards and decorations ==
- Van Eyken was a recipient of the Palme d'or of the Ordre de la Couronne
