= Marleen Vanderpoorten =

Belgian politician

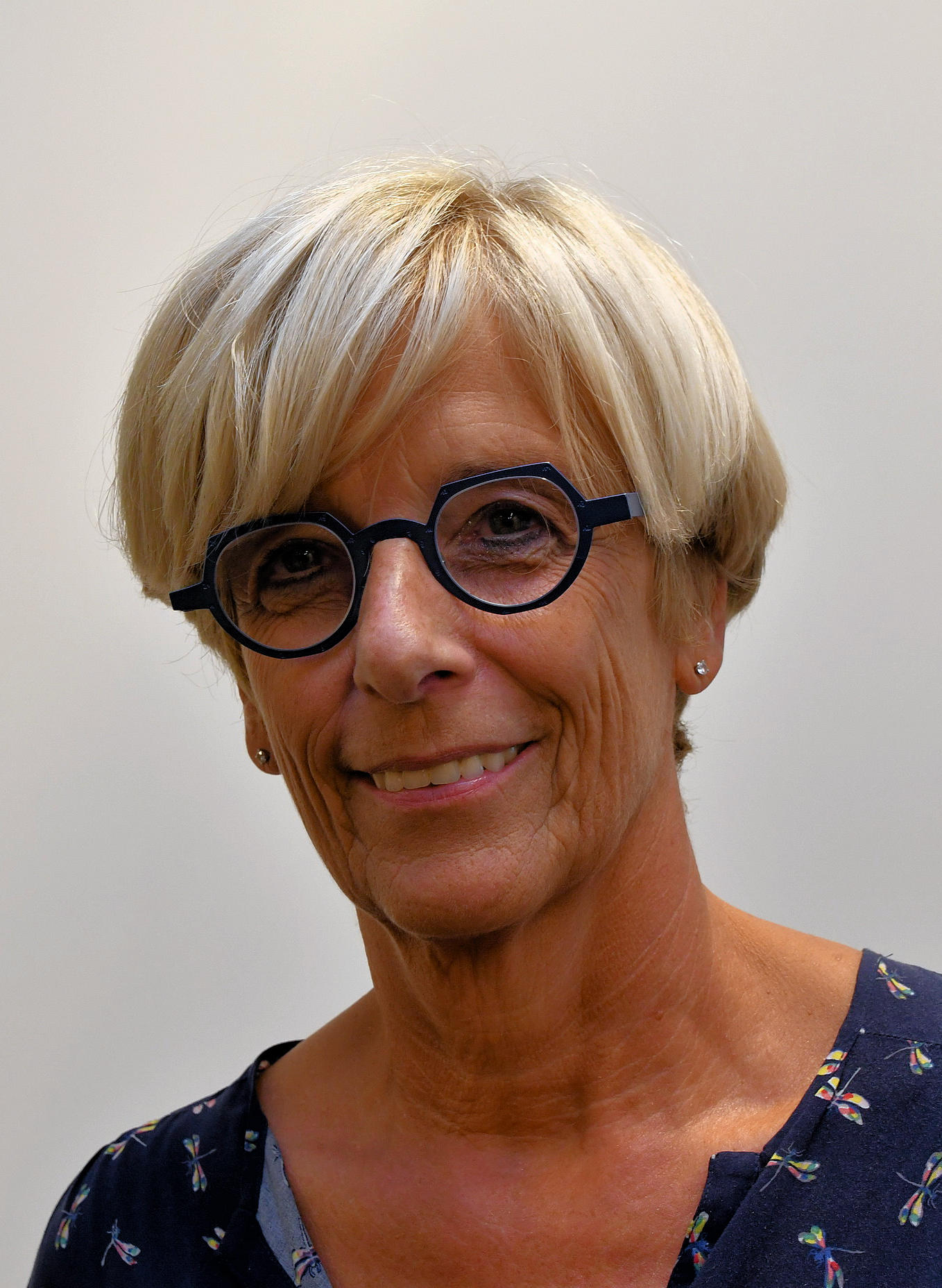

Speaker of the Flemish Parliament
- In office 13 July 2006 – 13 July 2009
- Preceded by: Norbert De Batselier
- Succeeded by: Jan Peumans

Personal details
- Born: 21 July 1954 (age 72) Lier, Belgium
- Party: Open Flemish Liberals and Democrats
- Education: University of Ghent

Marleen Caroline Valère Vanderpoorten (born 21 July 1954) is a Belgian politician from Flanders and member of the Flemish Liberals and Democrats (VLD). She is the daughter of Herman Vanderpoorten and granddaughter of Arthur Vanderpoorten. She obtained a degree in history from the University of Ghent (Ghent, Belgium).

From 1999 to 2004 she was the Minister of Education in the Flemish Government. On 12 July 2006 she succeeded Norbert De Batselier as President of the Flemish Parliament, and on 13 July 2009 Jan Peumans succeeded her.

== Political career ==
- Municipal Councillor in Lier (since 1989)
- Alderman in Lier (1989–1995)
- Mayor of Lier (1995–1999 and since 2004)
- Provincial Councillor in Antwerp (1987–1991)
- Member of the Flemish Parliament (1995–1999 and since 2004)
- Minister of Education in the Flemish Government (1999–2004)
- President of the Flemish Parliament (2006–2009)

Political offices
Preceded by Norbert De Batselier	Speaker of the Flemish Parliament; 2006–2009	Succeeded by Jan Peumans
