= Gilbert Bossuyt =

Belgian politician

Flemish Minister of Mobility, Public Works and Energy
- In office March 2003 – July 2004

Personal details
- Born: 16 September 1947 Lauwe, Belgium
- Party: Socialist Party Differently (sp.a)

Gilbert Bossuyt Paul Vincent (16 September 1947 – 17 April 2023) was a Belgian politician of the Socialist Party Differently (sp.a).

== Biography ==
In 1972, he graduated with a Doctor of Law at the Vrije Universiteit Brussel, a Dutch-speaking university in Brussels. He was national secretary of the textiles branch of the ABVV/FGTB labour union. He became active in municipal politics in Menen, where he became a councillor in 1971. After the municipal elections of 1988, he became mayor in 1989. He remained mayor for one legislative term and was succeeded in 1995 by Jean Libbrecht. After the next election, he became mayor again from 2001. In 2013, he was succeeded as mayor by Martine Fournier.

He was also active in national politics. From 1981 to 1995, he served as a federal representative for the Socialist Party (SP). From 1989 to 1994, he was in the Chamber even vice president and then SP parliamentary group leader until 1995.

In the period from December 1981 to May 1995, he had due to the then-existing dual mandate also a seat in the Flemish Council. The Flemish Council was the precursor to the current Flemish Parliament. At the first direct elections to the Flemish Parliament on 21 May 1995, he was elected in the constituency of Kortrijk-Roeselare-Tielt. Even after the Flemish elections of 13 June 1999 he remained in the Flemish Parliament until 18 March 2003. From July 1995 to September 2001, he was SP parliamentary group leader there. On 6 February 2002, in a plenary session of the Flemish Parliament, he was honoured for his 20 years of parliamentary service.

On 19 March 2003, Bossuyt succeeded Steve Stevaert as Flemish Minister for Mobility, Public Works and Energy, which he remained until mid-2004. At the next elections of 13 June 2004, he was again elected to the Flemish Parliament and served until June 2009. From January to June 2009 he was part of the Bureau (executive committee) of the Flemish Parliament as third vice president.

In December 2014, the Ghent appeals court confirmed his suspended sentence of one month in jail for forgery/misrepresentation in 2008.
