= Rik Boel =

Belgian politician and judge (1931–2020)

Minister of the Interior
- In office 1977–1979
- Prime Minister: Leo Tindemans (–1978); Paul Vanden Boeynants (1978–)
- Preceded by: Joseph Michel
- Succeeded by: Georges Gramme

Constitutional Court
- In office 1986–2001

Personal details
- Born: Henri Joseph Boel; 5 September 1931 Tienen, Belgium
- Died: 13 November 2020 (aged 89) Tienen, Belgium
- Party: Belgian Socialist Party (BSP)
- Occupation: Judge, politician

Henri "Rik" Joseph Boel (5 September 1931 – 13 November 2020) was a Belgian politician and judge.

== Biography ==
Henri Boel was born in Tienen on 5 September 1931. In 1954 Boel graduated from the Catholic University of Leuven as a Doctor Juris. From 1954 to 1986 Boel was active as a lawyer.

In the municipal elections of 1958 Boel was elected a city council member for the BSP in Tienen and served until 1986. He became mayor of the city in 1964 and served until 1976, and again from 1983 to 1986.

Boel was elected to the Belgian Chamber of Representatives in 1965, and re-elected in 1968, 1971, 1974, 1977 and 1978. From 3 June 1977 to 20 October 1978, Boel served as the minister of the interior in the government led by Leo Tindemans, and his successor Paul Vanden Boeynants. Boel became Speaker of the Cultural Council in 1979 (the predecessor of the Flemish Parliament) and, after it was reformed into the Vlaamse Raad, remained its speaker until December 1981. In 1981 Boel was elected to the Belgian Senate.

After he was appointed as a judge in the Court of Arbitration in 1986, Boel resigned all his political mandates. Boel served on the Court from 1986 until his retirement in 2001. From March 2001 until his retirement in September 2001, he served as President of the Dutch linguistic group on the Court.

Boel died on 13 November 2020 at home in Tienen.
