= Jan Peumans =

Belgian politician

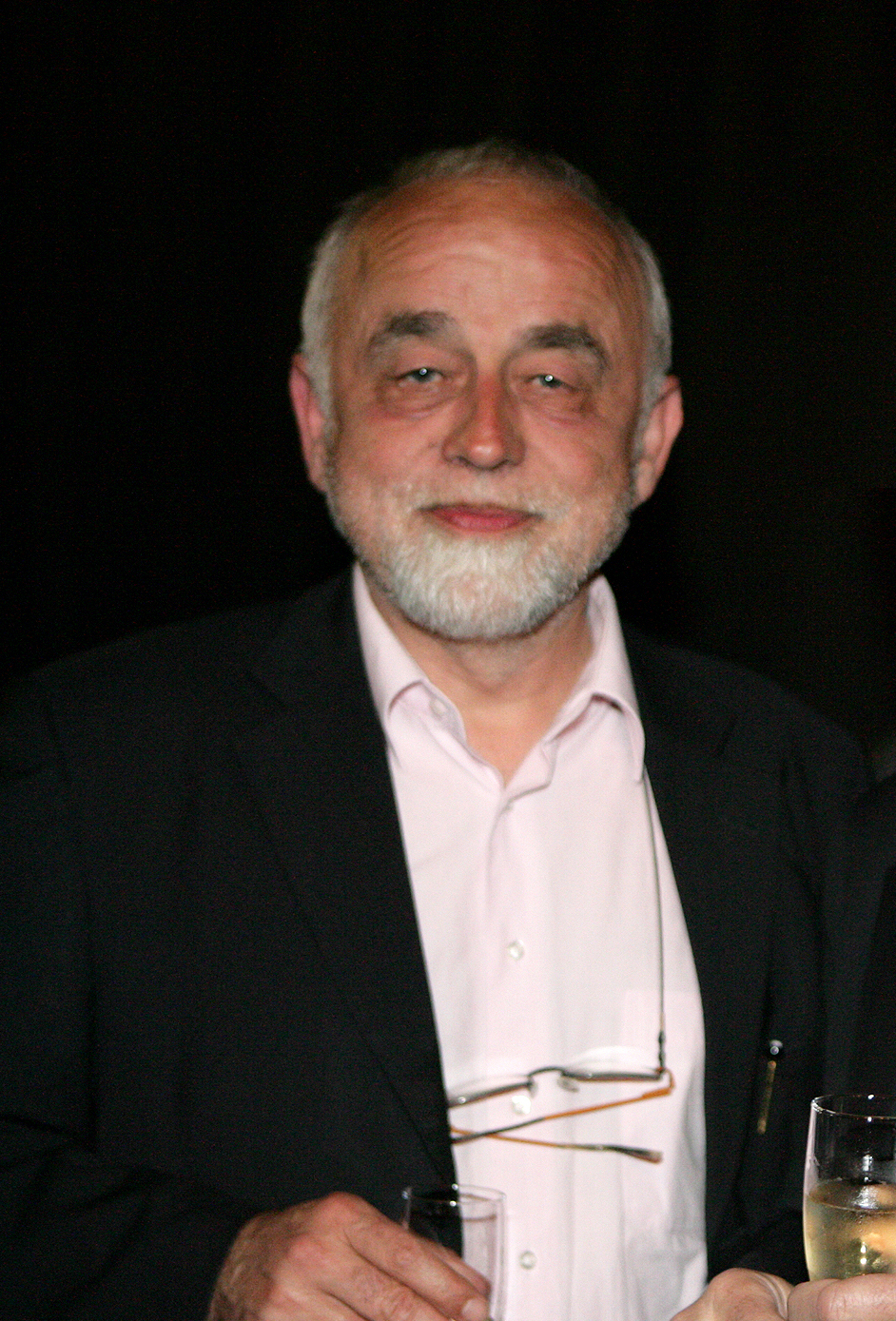

Speaker of the Flemish Parliament
- In office 13 July 2009 – 26 May 2019
- Preceded by: Marleen Vanderpoorten
- Succeeded by: Kris Van Dijck

Personal details
- Born: 6 January 1951 (age 74); Maastricht, Netherlands
- Political party: New Flemish Alliance

Jan Peter Peumans (born 6 January 1951 in Maastricht) is a Belgian politician from the Flemish province of Limburg. Being part of the Flemish Movement, he was at a young age already member of the Volksunie. He seated for that party in the Limburgish provincial council and is since 2004, a Flemish Parliament member for the New Flemish Alliance (N-VA). In July 2004, he opposed, as Mayor of Riemst, the lengthening of the runway at Liège Airport. From 2007 until 2009, he was N-VA fraction leader in the Flemish Parliament. After the elections of 7 June 2009 (which was successful for his party; and with more than 27.000 Limburgish preference votes for him), he became President of the Flemish Parliament, succeeding Marleen Vanderpoorten.

In the Flemish Parliament, he worked e.g. on the case of the Antwerp Oosterweel connection. Peumans was elected most hard-working member of the Parliament in the period 2004–2009, by the newspaper De Standaard.

On 27 January 2010, Peumans caused controversy after he was absent during a reception at the royal palace. As convinced republican he refuses to go to receptions at the king's palace, although he talked to him once on the occasion of the day of the Flemish Community.

On 12 September 2010, he was in Visé (just across the language border in Wallonia, close to where he lives), where he claims to have been insulted and attacked by a local because "he had no business in Wallonia". Peumans said afterwards he never expected he would be attacked due to his political points of view. His statement is being disputed by the alleged attacker.

== Political career ==
- 1983–1994: Schepen in Riemst
- 1983- : Municipal Councilor in Riemst
- 1985–1987: Councillor in Limburg
- 1991–2004: Councillor in Limburg
- 1995–2006: Mayor of Riemst
- 2004–2019: Member of the Flemish Parliament
- 2007–2012: Schepen in Riemst
- 2007–2009: Parliamentary group leader for the New Flemish Alliance in the Flemish Parliament
- 2008–2009: Vice President New Flemish Alliance
- 2009–2019: President of the Flemish Parliament
- 2024- : Councillor in Limburg

Political offices
Preceded by Marleen Vanderpoorten	Speaker of the Flemish Parliament; 2009–2019	Succeeded by Kris Van Dijck
