= André Van Nieuwkerke =

Belgian politician

Senator
- In office 5 July 2007 – June 2011

Personal details
- Born: 6 March 1953 (age 73) Bruges
- Party: Socialistische Partij Anders

André Van Nieuwkerke (born 1953) is a Belgian politician and a member of the Socialistische Partij Anders. He was elected as a member of the Belgian Senate in 2007.
