= Marino Keulen =

Belgian politician

- Born: Marino Ghislainus Keulen; 24 October 1963 (age 62); Tongeren, Belgium
- Occupation: politician

Marino Ghislainus Keulen (born 24 October 1963) is a Belgian politician for Anders (formerly Open Flemish Liberals and Democrats). He is a representative in the Flemish Parliament, and served in the Flemish Government of 2004–2009 as Minister of Home Affairs, Urban Policy, Housing and Civic Integration.

Keulen was born in Tongeren. He obtained a (graduate) degree at the Provinciaal Hoger Handelsinstituut in Hasselt.

Keulen served in the provincial council of Limburg 1994–1995 but gave up the seat when he was elected to the Flemish Parliament in 1995. Keulen was re-elected in 1999 and 2004. After a cabinet shuffle in 2003, Keulen entered the Flemish government as Flemish Minister for Housing, Media and Sport. After the regional elections of 2004, Keulen became Flemish Minister for Home Affairs, Urban Policy, Housing and Civic Integration.

Keulen was elected to the municipal council of Lanaken in 1988 and was re-elected in 1994, 2000 and 2006. From 1995 to 2000, Keulen served as an alderman in Lanaken. From 2007 on, Keulen served as the President of the municipal council of Lanaken.
