= Johan Sauwens =

Belgian politician

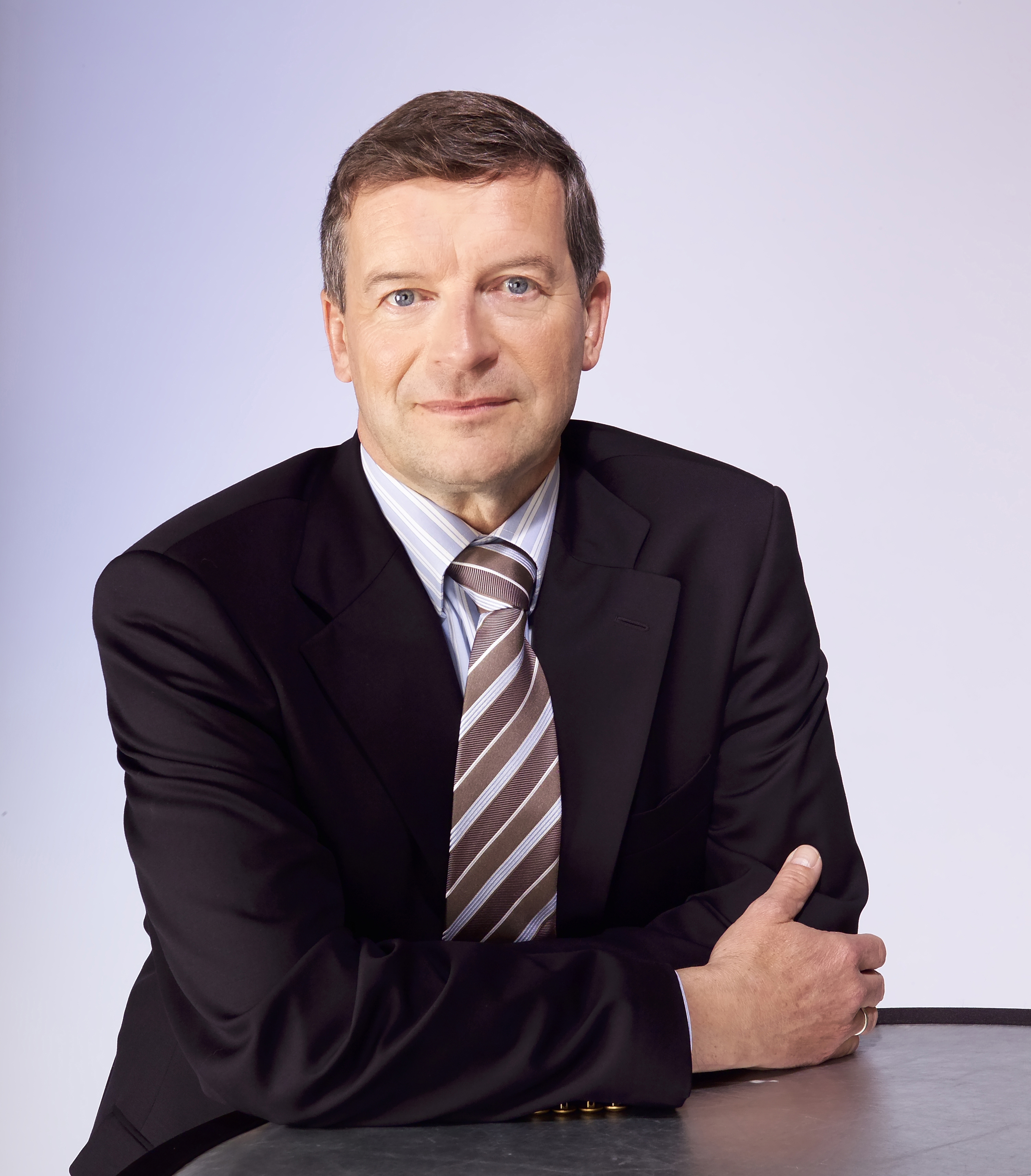

Johan Sauwens (born 14 March 1951 in Sint-Truiden, Belgium) is a Belgian politician from the province of Limburg.

== Biography ==
Sauwens studied law at the Catholic University of Leuven and was from 1975 to 1993 attorney. Politically, he was a member of the People's Union.

Between October 1985 and May 1995, he was a representative. Ex officio, he was also a member of the Flemish Council during that period. At the first direct elections to the Flemish Parliament on 21 May 1995, he was elected in the constituency of Hasselt-Tongeren-Maaseik. He was re-elected in the June 1999, Flemish elections but became Flemish minister shortly after, on 13 July 1999.

In May 2001, he was forced to resign as minister after it became known that he attended the anniversary celebration of the Sint-Maartensfonds, an organization of Flemish Eastern Front Fighters, where he was a member for over twenty years. He was succeeded as minister by Paul Van Grembergen. This affair accelerated the collapse of the People's Union. After his resignation as Flemish minister, he was again serving in the Flemish Parliament. After the dissolution of the People's Union in the autumn of 2001 (20 December), he moved over to the Christian democratic CD&V. In the Flemish elections of 13 June 2004 and 7 June 2009, he was again elected to the Flemish Parliament in the constituency of Limburg. On 23 November 2005, he and Trees Merckx-Van Goey were honored for their twenty years of parliamentary service during a plenary session in the Flemish Parliament.

On 14 January 2011, the politician called for a far-reaching autonomy for Flanders. He suggested that the N-VA and the CD&V rightly did not accept a half-hearted compromise on the difficult government formation after the federal elections of 13 June 2010.

In 2014, he ran for office in the Flemish elections for Limburg, but was not elected. Since 30 June 2014, he can call himself honorary Flemish representative. That title was awarded by the Bureau (executive committee) of the Flemish Parliament.

At the end of 2014, he was nominated by the CD&V as a member of the board of the Flemish public transport company De Lijn. In 2015, he co-founded technology firm Techno Link.

Sauwens again became mayor of Bilzen at the beginning of August 2019.

== Office ==
- 1976–1979: President of VU Youth
- 1977–present: Councillor of Bilzen
- 1977–1985: Provincial Councillor of Limburg
- 1983–1989: Mayor of Bilzen
- 1985–1995: Representative
- 1985–1995: Member of the Flemish Council
- 1988–1992: Community Minister for Public Works and Transport
- 1992–1995: Flemish Minister for Foreign Trade, Transport and State reform
- 1993–2000: Member of the Committee of the Regions
- 1995–2012: Mayor of Bilzen
- 1995–1999: Member of the Flemish Parliament
- 1999–2001: Flemish Minister for Interior Affairs, Public Service and Sports
- 2000–2001: Flemish Minister for Urban Policy and Housing
- 2001–2014: Member Flemish Parliament
- 2007–2014: Member of the Committee of the Regions
- 2009: Interim Speaker of the Flemish Parliament
