= Flemish Parliament =

Elected legislative body of Flanders

Coordinates: 50°50′51″N 4°22′03″E

Flemish Parliament Vlaams Parlement (Dutch)
- 2024–2029 legislature

Type
- Type: Unicameral
- Term limits: None

Leadership
- Speaker: Freya Van den Bossche, Vooruit since 8 January 2025
- Group leaders: majority: Wilfried Vandaele, N-VA since 4 October 2019
- Peter Van Rompuy, CD&V since 6 February 2019
- Willem-Frederik Schiltz, Open VLD since 2 October 2019
- opposition: Hannelore Goeman, Forward since 28 December 2019
- Mieke Schauvliege, Groen since 26 April 2023
- Chris Janssens, Vlaams Belang since 25 June 2014

Structure
- Seats: 124; 118 from the Flemish Region; 6 from the Brussels-Capital Region
- Political groups: Government (65): N-VA (31); Vooruit (18); CD&V (16); Opposition (59): Vlaams Belang (31); Groen (9); PVDA (9); Anders (7); Team Fouad Ahidar (1); Independent (2)
- Length of term: 5 years

Elections
- Voting system: Open list proportional representation (using D'Hondt method) within six constituencies, with 5% constituency electoral threshold
- Last election: 9 June 2024
- Next election: June 2029

Meeting place
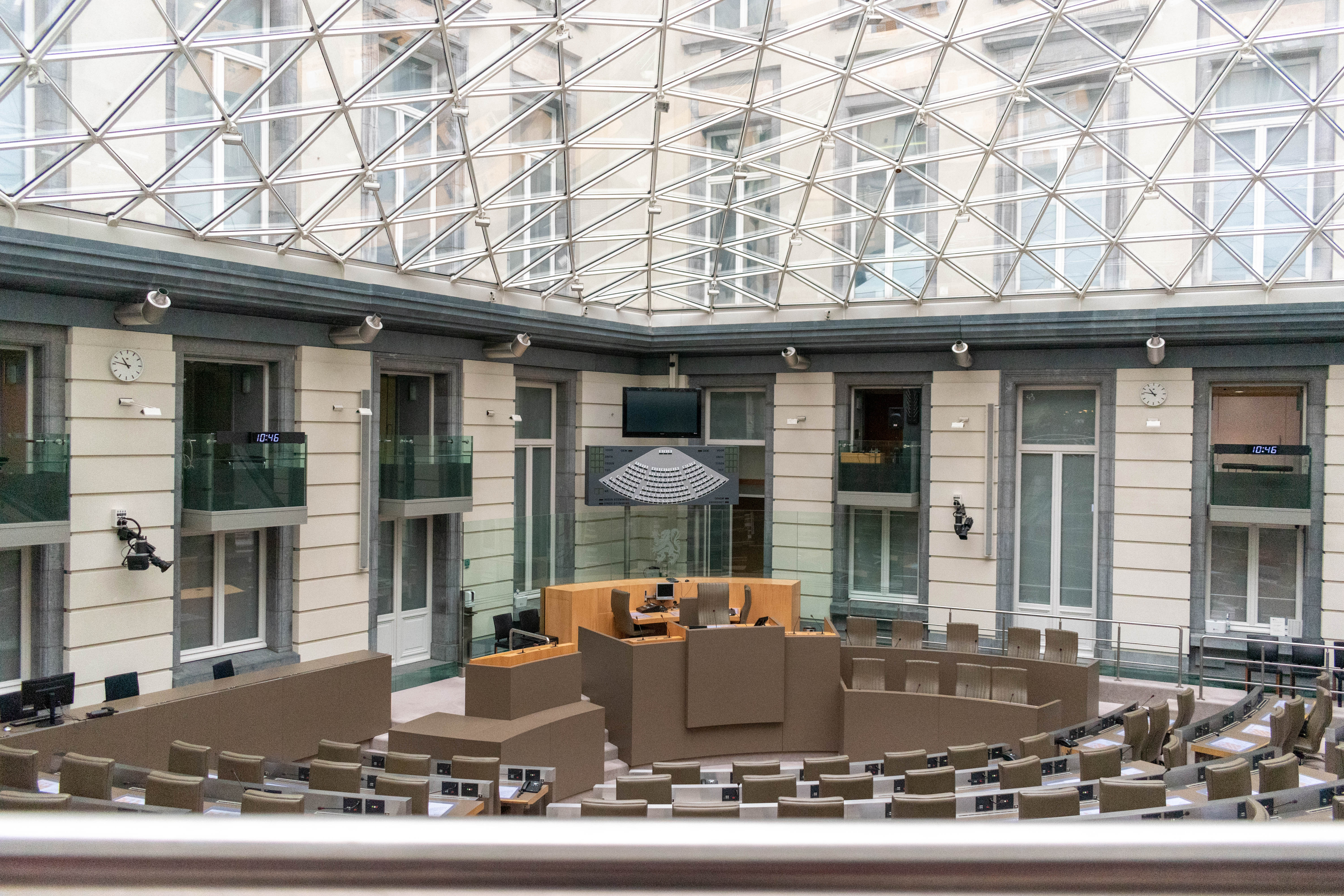
- Koepelzaal, Flemish Parliament building, Brussels

Website
- http://www.vlaamsparlement.be/

The Flemish Parliament (Dutch: Vlaams Parlement, formerly called Flemish Council or Vlaamse Raad) constitutes the legislative power in Flanders for matters which fall within the competence of Flanders, both as a geographic region and as a cultural community of Belgium (unlike the French Community and Wallonia, which each have separate legislatures: the Parliament of the French Community and the Parliament of Wallonia).

The Flemish Parliament approves decrees, which are Flemish laws, applicable to all persons in the Flemish Region, and to Flemish institutions in Brussels; it appoints and supervises the Flemish Government; and it approves the Flemish budget. The Flemish Parliament meets in the Flemish Parliament building in central Brussels, and its members and staff are housed in the House of the Flemish Representatives.

== History ==
From 1830 until 1970, Belgium was a unitary state with a single government and a bicameral national parliament. The laws issued by Parliament applied to all Belgians, and government ministers exercised their authority across the length and breadth of the country. Between 1970 and 2001 the Belgian Parliament approved five successive constitutional reforms. Slowly they changed Belgium from a unitary into a federal state. Part of this was to give the communities and later the regions, their own parliaments.

On 7 December 1971, the Cultural Council for the Dutch-speaking Cultural Community held its first meeting; later followed a parliament for the Flemish Region. Flanders decided as early as 1980 to merge the Flemish Community with the Flemish Region. As a result, Flanders now has a single parliament and a single government with competence over community as well as over regional matters. This Parliament was called the Vlaamse Raad until it was officially renamed Vlaams Parlement (Flemish Parliament) on 13 June 1995. Over the last thirty years, Flanders has thus developed into a separate state within the federalised Belgium.

Members are called "Vlaamse Volksvertegenwoordigers". In English, they are referred to as "Members of the Flemish Parliament" (MFPs), like the MSPs in Scotland and the MEPs in the European Union. The title "Flemish Representative" is also used in English. Since 1995 members of the Flemish Parliament have been directly elected.

Currently, many voices in the Flemish Movement would like the Flemish Parliament to acquire certain sovereign powers in addition to those concerning language, culture and education.

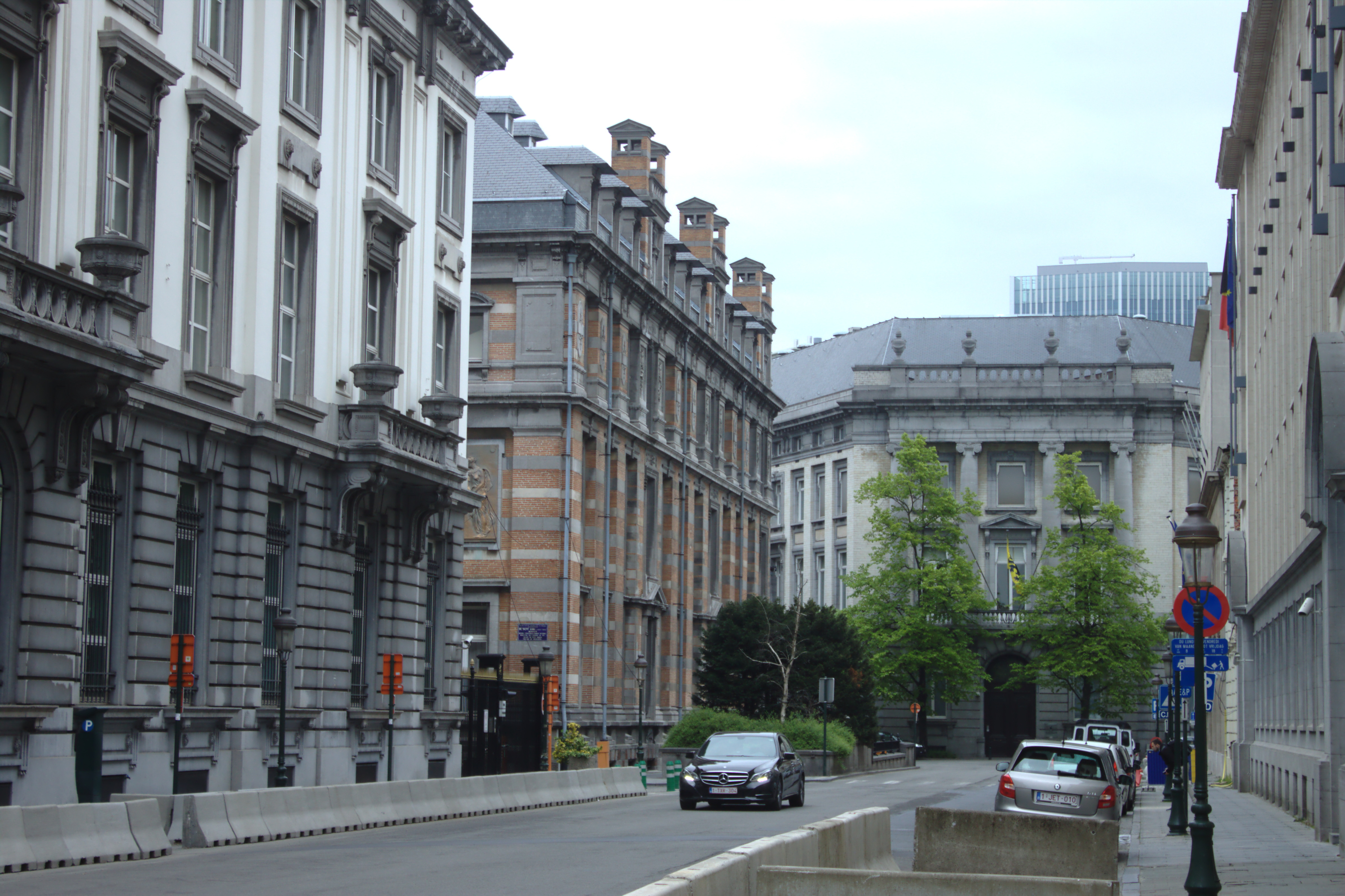
Flemish Parliament building seen here at a distance, at the intersection of Hertogsstraat & Drukpersstraat, formerly the headquarters of Belgian Post until 1987

== Competencies (Jurisdiction) ==
The Flemish Parliament enacts decrees, which are Flemish laws, either as a decree of the Flemish Community or as a decree of the Flemish Region (or often as a decree combining provisions for both entities). Regional legislation is only applicable to all persons in the Flemish Region whereas community legislation also applies to Flemish institutions or services in Brussels (and thus to persons in Brussels who choose to make use of these institutions or services, such as schools).

No hierarchy exists between (federal) laws and Flemish decrees, as each level is supposed to have clearly defined subject-matter jurisdiction. The basis for the community subject-matter jurisdiction is defined in the Belgian Constitution, but the Special Law on Institutional Reform defines all matters in high detail. They can be summarised as follows:

=== Competencies for the entire Flemish Community ===
1. Culture: The Flemish parliament is competent for all cultural matters. This includes protection of the cultural heritage (e.g. literature, fine arts), tourism and the media. The public Flemish radio and television broadcasting company is the VRT.
2. Language use: including language use in schools and universities, in the Flemish and local administrations, and in relations between employers and employees in the Dutch-speaking part of Belgium, with exception of the "language facilities" enjoyed in some municipalities.
3. All "matters relating to the person": youth protection, family policy and childcare, together with policy regarding the handicapped, old age pensioners, equal opportunities and the integration of migrants.
4. Education: from kindergarten to university including scholarships, though the establishment of the period of compulsory education, requirements for awarding degrees, and pension schemes for teachers remain at the federal level.
5. Health care: including preventive health care, home care, institutions for mental health care, but excluding health insurance, financing of hospitals and most other competencies that remained federal.

=== Competencies for the Flemish Region only ===
1. Economy, employment and energy policy: includes government support for business, employment policy, agriculture and fisheries, the distribution of electricity and natural gas, the exploitation of new energy sources and the promotion of responsible use of energy
2. Town and country planning, housing, land development & nature conservation: including regional planning, building permits, housing policy, social housing, urban renewal, preservation of monuments and natural sites, land consolidation and nature conservation
3. Environment and water policy: including the reduction of air, land and water pollution, noise control, the purification of waste water, the production and distribution of drinking water and waste disposal policy
4. Scientific research: this field is the full responsibility of the regional authorities, except for aerospace and military research (that remained federal).
5. Public works and transport: includes roads, ports (the Port of Antwerp, Port of Bruges-Zeebrugge, Port of Ghent and the Port of Ostend), the regional airports (including Antwerp International Airport and Ostend-Bruges International Airport), and urban and regional transport.
6. Agriculture: includes the Agricultural Investment Fund, the agricultural education, the development of rural regions, the sale of agricultural and horticultural products and the fisheries policy. By the stipulations of the Lambermont Agreement (2001), the regions are competent for almost the complete agricultural policy but a few security aspects like food security and animal welfare which remained under the competence of the federal government.
7. Local government: includes the allocating of financial resources to the 300 Flemish municipalities and to the five Flemish provinces, and administrative supervision of these communes and provinces and their laws.

=== International affairs ===
For all areas within its sphere of competence (both vis-à-vis community or regional competences), the Flemish region can conclude international treaties with other states, whether they are national states or member states of a federation. This competence includes development cooperation and foreign trade.

== Procedure ==
A regular legislative session starts in September, when the Government presents its "September Declaration" (Septemberverklaring), a practice based on the speech from the throne. Plenary sessions are usually held on Wednesdays.

The Flemish Parliament largely functions like its federal, community and regional counterparts, mutatis mutandis. Bills are usually introduced by the Government (ontwerp van decreet), but members of parliament can also propose bills (voorstel van decreet or private member's bill). Bills are first considered in committee, after which they are put to a vote in the plenary. Votes are usually recorded electronically. For example, during the 2009–14 legislature, 407 government bills were adopted, while only 102 private member's bills were made law.

== Elections and membership ==
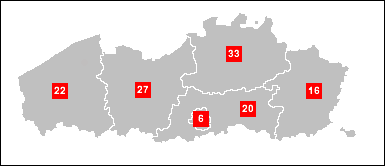
Number of seats per constituency in Flanders

118 members are directly elected in the Flemish Region. They have voting rights for both regional and community competencies. Six members are directly elected in the Brussels-Capital Region by those voters who voted for a Dutch-speaking party in the Brussels regional elections. They have no voting rights for the regional competencies.

The elections take place every five years, simultaneously with the elections for the other regional and community parliaments and for the European Parliament. Thus, de facto the European decision-makers determine when the Flemish Parliament elections occur.

This table shows the distribution of seats following the 2024 regional election:

Affiliation	Constituency						Total
Affiliation	Ant.	E-Fl.	Fl-Br.	Lim.	W-Fl.	Bru.	Total
New Flemish Alliance (N-VA)	10	7	5	4	5	1	31
Flemish Interest (Vlaams Belang)	8	6	4	5	6	1	31
Forward (Vooruit)	4	5	3	2	3	1	18
Christian Democratic and Flemish (CD&V)	3	3	3	3	4	0	16
Open Flemish Liberals and Democrats (Open Vld)	2	2	3	1	1	0	9
Workers' Party of Belgium (PVDA)	4	2	1	1	1	0	9
Green (Groen)	2	2	2	0	1	2	9
Team Fouad Ahidar (TFA)	0	0	0	0	0	1	1
Total	33	27	21	16	21	6	124

=== Previous legislative terms ===
The following table lists each legislative term since 1995, when the Flemish Parliament was first directly elected following the fourth state reform.

The parties are ordered by size in the respective term. Green coloured parties indicate the government majority, whereas red parties form the opposition.

Legislative term	Inaugural composition									Government
2024–2029 (elected in 2024)		N-VA 31 / 124	Vlaams Belang 31 / 124	Vooruit 18 / 124	CD&V 16 / 124	Open Vld 9 / 124	PVDA 9 / 124	Groen 9 / 124	Team Fouad Ahidar 1 / 124	Diependaele (N-VA, Vooruit, CD&V)
2019–2024 (elected in 2019)	Seat division 2019-2024	N-VA 35 / 124	Vlaams Belang 23 / 124	CD&V 19 / 124	Open Vld 16 / 124	Groen 14 / 124	sp.a 13 / 124	PVDA 4 / 124	—N/a	Jambon (2019–2024); Homans (2019) (N-VA, CD&V, Open Vld)
2014–2019 (elected in 2014)	Seat division 2014-2019	N-VA 43 / 124	CD&V 27 / 124	Open Vld 19 / 124	sp.a 18 / 124	Groen 10 / 124	Vlaams Belang 6 / 124	UF 1 / 124	—N/a	Bourgeois (N-VA, CD&V, Open Vld)
2009–2014 (elected in 2009)	Seat division 2009-2014	CD&V 31 / 124	Vlaams Belang 21 / 124	Open Vld 21 / 124	sp.a 19 / 124	N-VA 16 / 124	LDD 8 / 124	Groen 7 / 124	UF 1 / 124	Peeters II (CD&V, sp.a, N-VA)
2004–2009 (elected in 2004)	Seat division 2004-2009	CD&V/N-VA 35 / 124	Vlaams Belang 32 / 124	VLD-Vivant 25 / 124	sp.a-Spirit 25 / 124	Groen! 6 / 124	UF 1 / 124	—N/a	—N/a	Peeters I (2007–2009); Leterme (2004–2007) (CD&V/N-VA, sp.a-Spirit, VLD-Vivant)
1999–2004 (elected in 1999)	Seat division 1999-2004	CVP 30 / 124	VLD 27 / 124	Vlaams Blok 22 / 124	SP 20 / 124	Agalev 12 / 124	VU-ID 12 / 124	UF 1 / 124	—N/a	Somers (2003–2004); Dewael (1999–2003) (VLD, SP, Agalev, VU-ID)
1995–1999 (elected in 1995)	Seat division 1995-1999	CVP 37 / 124	VLD 27 / 124	SP 26 / 124	Vlaams Blok 17 / 124	VU 9 / 124	Agalev 7 / 124	UF 1 / 124	—N/a	Van den Brande IV (CVP, SP)

1995–1999

7	26	37	27	9	17	1
Agalev	SP	CVP	VLD	VU	VB	UF

1999–2004

12	20	30	27	12	22	1
Agalev	SP	CVP	VLD	VU-ID	VB	UF

2004–2009

6	25	35	25	32	1
Groen	SP.A + Spirit	CD&V + N-VA	VLD + Vivant	VB	UF

2009–2014

7	19	31	21	8	16	21	1
Groen	SP.A	CD&V	Open VLD	LDD	N-VA	VB	UF

2014–2019

10	18	27	19	43	6	1
Groen	SP.A	CD&V	Open VLD	N-VA	VB	UF

2019–2024

4	14	13	19	16	35	23
PVDA	Groen	SP.A	CD&V	Open VLD	N-VA	VB

2024–present

1	9	9	18	16	9	31	31
TFA	PVDA	Groen	Vooruit	CD&V	Open VLD	N-VA	VB

== Officers ==
At the beginning of each parliamentary year, on the fourth Monday in September, the Flemish Parliament elects its Speaker. The Speaker chairs the plenary sessions of the Flemish Parliament and acts as its official representative. The speaker determines whether a certain initiative is admissible and thus can be put to parliament at all. The Flemish Ministers take the oath before the Speaker of the Flemish Parliament. Only the head of the Flemish government, the Flemish Minister-President, takes the oath before the King.

The Speaker of the Flemish Parliament is assisted by the Bureau, which consists of the Speaker, four Deputy Speakers and three Secretaries. The Bureau is responsible for the day-to-day activities of the Flemish Parliament and meets at least once every two weeks. The Extended Bureau, which consists of the Bureau and the floor leaders of the recognised political fractions in the Flemish Parliament coordinates the political activities of the Flemish Parliament and sets the agenda for the plenary session. It usually meets every week on Monday.

=== Speakers ===
Cultural Council for the Dutch Cultural Community (Cultuurraad voor de Nederlandse Cultuurgemeenschap)

- 1971-1974: Robert Vandekerckhove (CVP)
- 1974-1977: Jan Bascour (PVV)
- 1977-1979: Maurits Coppieters (VU)
- 1979-1980: Rik Boel (BSP)

Flemish Council (Vlaamse Raad)

- 1980-1981: Rik Boel (BSP)
- 1981-1985: Jean Pede (PVV)
- 1985-1988: Frans Grootjans (PVV)
- 1988: Jean Pede (PVV)
- 1988-1994: Louis Vanvelthoven (SP)
- 1994-1995: Eddy Baldewijns (SP)

Flemish Parliament (Vlaams Parlement)

- 1995–2006: Norbert De Batselier (sp.a)
- 2006–2009: Marleen Vanderpoorten (Open Vld)
- 2009–2019: Jan Peumans (N-VA)
- 2019: Kris Van Dijck (N-VA)
- 2019: Wilfried Vandaele (N-VA)
- 2019–2025: Liesbeth Homans (N-VA)
- 2025–present: Freya Van den Bossche (Vooruit)

== Committees ==
Much of the work of the Flemish Parliament is done in committee. The Flemish Parliament currently has eleven standing committees. Each committee is specialised in a particular subject area and consists of 15 Members of the Flemish Parliament. The primary task of the committees is to examine the texts of decree proposals and organise hearings and discussions on decree proposals. There are usually also ad hoc committees, such as the Digital Flanders Committee and the Flemish Constitution Committee.

=== List of standing committees ===
- Committee for General Affairs and Financial and Budgetary Matters
  - Subcommittee on Finance and Budget
- Committee for Brussels and its Flemish Periphery
- Committee for Administrative Affairs, Institutional and Administrative Reform and Decree Evaluation
- Committee for Housing, Urban Policy, Integration and Equal Opportunities
- Committee for Foreign Policy, European Affairs, International Co-operation and Tourism
- Committee for Education, Training, Science and Innovation
- Committee for Culture, Youth, Sports and Media
- Committee for Public Well-Being, Public Health and Family Affairs
- Committee for Economic Affairs, Employment and Social Economics
  - Subcommittee on Arms Trade
- Committee for Environmental and Nature Conservation Issues, Agriculture, Fishery and Rural Development Policy and Town and Country Planning and Real Estate
  - Subcommittee on Agriculture, Fishery and Rural Policy
- Committee for Public Works, Mobility and Energy

== See also ==
- Flemish Community Commission
- Flemish Council for Science and Innovation (VRWI)
- Flemish Institute for Technological Research (VITO)
- Parliament of the Brussels-Capital Region
- Parliament of Wallonia
- Politics of Flanders
- Resolutions of the Flemish Parliament of 1999
