= List of candidates in the 2010 Belgian federal election =

This article presents the detailed constituency-level results of the 2010 Belgian federal election, including the seat distribution in the Chamber of Representatives and the Senate, broken down by electoral college and constituency.

== Chamber of Representatives ==
Seat distribution		After 2007 election	After 2010 election
1.	CD&V	23 / 150	17 / 150
1.	MR	23 / 150	18 / 150
3.	PS	20 / 150	26 / 150
4.	OPEN VLD	18 / 150	13 / 150
5.	VLAAMS BELANG	17 / 150	12 / 150
6.	SP.A	14 / 150	13 / 150
7.	CDH	10 / 150	9 / 150
8.	ECOLO	8 / 150	8 / 150
9.	N-VA	7 / 150	27 / 150
10.	LDD	5 / 150	1 / 150
11.	GROEN!	4 / 150	5 / 150
12.	FN	1 / 150	0 / 150
13.	PP	—	1 / 150

=== Constituencies ===
==== Antwerp (24 seats) ====
Major parties
	CD&V: 170,260 (15.53%); 4 (—)	GROEN!: 84,314 (7.69%); 2 (+1)	LDD: 9,907 (3.14%); 0 (–1)	N-VA: 336,631 (30.71%); 8 (—)	OPEN VLD: 120,935 (11.03%); 3 (–1)
1.	Inge Vervotte [1] — 78,951	Meyrem Almaci [1] — 25,100	—	Jan Jambon [1] — 61,100	Annemie Turtelboom [1] — 35,861
2.	Servais Verherstraeten [2] — 22,353	Kristof Calvo [2] — 4,767	—	Sophie De Wit [2] — 26,918	Bart Somers [2] — 18,030
3.	Nahima Lanjri [3] — 11,952	—	—	Flor Van Noppen [3] — 21,635	Willem-Frederik Schiltz [3] — 8,686
4.	Jef Van den Bergh [4] — 13,092	—	—	Zuhal Demir [4] — 10,248	—
5.	—	—	—	Reinilde Van Moer [5] — 8,956	—
6.	—	—	—	Jan Van Esbroeck [6] — 6,527	—
7.	—	—	—	—	—
8.	—	—	—	Minneke De Ridder [8] — 9,404	—
24.	—	—	—	Kris Van Dijck [7] — 15,607	—
	SP.A: 156,976 (14.32%); 3 (=0)	VB: 177,012 (16.15%); 4 (–2)			
1.	Caroline Gennez [1] — 41,284	Gerolf Annemans [1] — 56,226			
2.	Patrick Janssens [2] — 32,104	Rita De Bont [2] — 9,870			
3.	Maya Detiège [3] — 18,901	Bruno Valkeniers [3] — 14,378			
24.	—	Alexandra Colen [4] — 6,806			
Minor parties
	PVDA+: 22,132 (2.02%); 0 (=0)				
1.	Peter Mertens				
2.	Mie Branders				
3.	Wouter Van Damme				
4.	Mireille Govaerts				
5.	Mohamed Chebaa				
6.	Nadine Peeters				
7.	Jokke Schreurs				
8.	Erica De Meyer				
9.	Wout Schafraet				
10.	Ilona Van Looy				
11.	Sadiq Mazghani				
12.	Leen Swinnen				
13.	Erik Sontrop				
14.	Najat Beraich				
15.	Luc Van de Weyer				
16.	Jitske Eekman				
17.	Mazlum Kilic				
18.	Maya Van Dyck				
19.	Bert De Ryck				
20.	Julie Van Berlo				
21.	Marc Peeters				
22.	Sofie Sas				
23.	Lieve Pepermans				
24.	Dirk Tuypens				

==== Brussels-Halle-Vilvoorde (22 seats) ====
Major parties:

	CDH	67,324 (8.07%)	2 (=0)	Joëlle Milquet
	Candidate		Votes	
1.	Joëlle Milquet		33,097	
2.				
3.				
4.				
5.				
6.				
7.				
8.				
9.				
10.				
11.				
12.				
13.				
14.				
15.				
16.				
17.				
18.				
19.				
20.				
21.				
22.				
(1)				
(2)				
(3)				
(4)				
(5)				
(6)				
(7)				
(8)				
(9)				
(10)				
(11)				
(12)				

	CD&V	57,902 (6.94%)	2 (—)	Steven Vanackere
	Candidate		Votes	
1.	Steven Vanackere [1]		18,695	
2.	Sonja Becq [2]		8,661	
3.	Michel Doomst		13,714	
4.	Dirk Pieters		5,792	
5.	Bart Coopman		3,012	
6.	Christine Hemerijckx		4,604	
7.	Kris Poelaert		5,297	
8.	Marleen Mertens		2,801	
9.	Rik De Baerdemaeker		2,821	
10.	Ineke Robijns		2,620	
11.	Fons Heyvaert		2,863	
12.	Greet Willems		2,066	
13.	Chantal Peeters		1,552	
14.	Iris Depoorter		1,669	
15.	Michel Vanderhasselt		2,675	
16.	Mich Pompen		1,431	
17.	Monika Van Steenbrugge		1,565	
18.	Carla Van den Houwe		1,609	
19.	Sarah Mousaid		1,387	
20.	Jef Vanderoost		1,844	
21.	Eddy Deknopper		1,495	
22.	Marc Van Asch		2,340	
(1)	Michel Doomst		7,011	
(2)	Sonja Becq		3,633	
(3)	Conny Moons		2,755	
(4)	Stefaan De Corte		1,131	
(5)	Anne Sobrie		1,802	
(6)	Bart De Wandeleer		983	
(7)	Ann Hottat		924	
(8)	Ghislain De Wolf		747	
(9)	Danny De Kock		770	
(10)	Brigitte De Pauw		1,880	
(11)	Tom Dehaene		5,762	
(12)	Brigitte Grouwels		3,880	

	ECOLO	66,681 (7.99%)	2 (=0)	Olivier Deleuze
	Candidate		Votes	
1.	Olivier Deleuze [1]		14,617	
2.	Zoé Genot [2]		9,500	
3.				
4.				
5.				
6.				
7.				
8.				
9.				
10.				
11.				
12.				
13.				
14.				
15.				
16.				
17.				
18.				
19.				
20.				
21.				
22.				
(1)				
(2)				
(3)				
(4)				
(5)				
(6)				
(7)				
(8)				
(9)				
(10)				
(11)				
(12)				

	FN	5,476 (0.66%)	0 (=0)	Florence Matagne
	Candidate		Votes	
1.	Florence Matagne		1,358	
2.				
3.				
4.				
5.				
6.				
7.				
8.				
9.				
10.				
11.				
12.				
13.				
14.				
15.				
16.				
17.				
18.				
19.				
20.				
21.				
22.				
(1)				
(2)				
(3)				
(4)				
(5)				
(6)				
(7)				
(8)				
(9)				
(10)				
(11)				
(12)				

	GROEN!	25,186 (3.02%)	0 (–1)	Tinne Van der Straeten
	Candidate		Votes	
1.	Tinne Van der Straeten		6,830	
2.	Jean-Pierre Maeyens		775	
3.	Fatima Boudjaoui		2,344	
4.	Leentje Van Aken		1,770	
5.	Klaas Lagrou		712	
6.	Dirk Snauwaert		665	
7.	Sabah Meschi		1,164	
8.	Karel De Ridder		929	
9.	Jenny Sleeuwaegen		917	
10.	Jef Hollebecq		607	
11.	Ilse Rymenants		1,194	
12.	Bart Hassens		593	
13.	Monique Brys		980	
14.	Jan Steyaert		563	
15.	Katia Van den Broucke		1,107	
16.	Patrick Gillis		499	
17.	Cecile Verwimp-Sillis		893	
18.	Luc Denys		625	
19.	Alena Van den Bussche		1,004	
20.	Bert Vannieuwenhuyse		493	
21.	Adelheid Byttebier		1,336	
22.	Bart Staes		2,110	
(1)	Marie-Jeanne Thaelemans		1,024	
(2)	Bart Dhondt		441	
(3)	Ghislaine Duerinckx		543	
(4)	Eddie Boelens		440	
(5)	Magda Van Stevens		678	
(6)	Geert De Winter		335	
(7)	Nathalie Espeel		664	
(8)	Erwin Malfroy		284	
(9)	Bart Bogaerts		279	
(10)	Erik Torbeyns		398	
(11)	Elke Van den Brandt		836	
(12)	Annemie Maes		1,074	

	LDD	9,442 (1.13%)	0 (=0)	Piet Deslé
	Candidate		Votes	
1.	Piet Deslé			
2.				
3.				
4.				
5.				
6.				
7.				
8.				
9.				
10.				
11.				
12.				
13.				
14.				
15.				
16.				
17.				
18.				
19.				
20.				
21.				
22.				
(1)				
(2)				
(3)				
(4)				
(5)				
(6)				
(7)				
(8)				
(9)				
(10)				
(11)				
(12)				

	MR	159,912 (19.17%)	5 (–1)	Olivier Maingain
	Candidate		Votes	
1.	Olivier Maingain [1]		62,988	
2.				
3.				
4.				
5.				
6.				
7.				
8.				
9.				
10.				
11.				
12.				
13.				
14.				
15.				
16.				
17.				
18.				
19.				
20.				
21.				
22.				
(1)				
(2)				
(3)				
(4)				
(5)				
(6)				
(7)				
(8)				
(9)				
(10)				
(11)				
(12)				

	N-VA	101,991 (12.23%)	3 (—)	Ben Weyts
	Candidate		Votes	
1.	Ben Weyts [1]			
2.				
3.				
4.				
5.				
6.				
7.				
8.				
9.				
10.				
11.				
12.				
13.				
14.				
15.				
16.				
17.				
18.				
19.				
20.				
21.				
22.				
(1)				
(2)				
(3)				
(4)				
(5)				
(6)				
(7)				
(8)				
(9)				
(10)				
(11)				
(12)				

	OPEN VLD	59,840 (7.17%)	2 (=0)	Guy Vanhengel
	Candidate		Votes	
1.	Guy Vanhengel			
2.	Maggie De Block			
3.				
4.				
5.				
6.				
7.				
8.				
9.				
10.				
11.				
12.				
13.				
14.				
15.				
16.				
17.				
18.				
19.				
20.				
21.				
22.				
(1)				
(2)				
(3)				
(4)				
(5)				
(6)				
(7)				
(8)				
(9)				
(10)				
(11)				
(12)				

	PS	139,660 (16.74%)	4 (+1)	Laurette Onkelinx
	Candidate		Votes	
1.	Laurette Onkelinx [1]		40,621	
2.	[2]			
3.	[4]			
4.				
5.				
6.				
7.				
8.				
9.				
10.				
11.				
12.				
13.				
14.				
15.				
16.				
17.				
18.				
19.				
20.				
21.				
22.	[3]			
(1)				
(2)				
(3)				
(4)				
(5)				
(6)				
(7)				
(8)				
(9)				
(10)				
(11)				
(12)				

	SP.A	38,689 (4.64%)	1 (—)	Hans Bonte
	Candidate		Votes	
1.	Hans Bonte			
2.				
3.				
4.				
5.				
6.				
7.				
8.				
9.				
10.				
11.				
12.				
13.				
14.				
15.				
16.				
17.				
18.				
19.				
20.				
21.				
22.				
(1)				
(2)				
(3)				
(4)				
(5)				
(6)				
(7)				
(8)				
(9)				
(10)				
(11)				
(12)				

	VLAAMS BELANG	41,917 (5.03%)	1 (–1)	Filip De Man
	Candidate		Votes	
1.	Filip De Man			
2.				
3.				
4.				
5.				
6.				
7.				
8.				
9.				
10.				
11.				
12.				
13.				
14.				
15.				
16.				
17.				
18.				
19.				
20.				
21.				
22.				
(1)				
(2)				
(3)				
(4)				
(5)				
(6)				
(7)				
(8)				
(9)				
(10)				
(11)				
(12)				

Minor parties:

	PTB/PVDA+	9,313 (1.12)	0 (=0)	Riet Dhont
	Candidate		Votes	
1.	Riet Dhont		1,393	
2.				
3.				
4.				
5.				
6.				
7.				
8.				
9.				
10.				
11.				
12.				
13.				
14.				
15.				
16.				
17.				
18.				
19.				
20.				
21.				
22.				
(1)				
(2)				
(3)				
(4)				
(5)				
(6)				
(7)				
(8)				
(9)				
(10)				
(11)				
(12)				

==== East Flanders (20 seats) ====
Major parties
	CD&V: 147,151 (15.40%); 3 (—)	GROEN!: 70,297 (7.36%); 1 (=0)	LDD: 30,463 (3.19%); 0 (–1)	N-VA: 269,049 (28.15%); 6 (—)	OPEN VLD: 166,278 (17.40%); 4 (–1)
1.	Pieter De Crem [1] — 39,666	Stefaan Van Hecke [1] — 10,283	Rudi De Kerpel — 4,157	Siegfried Bracke [1] — 101,940	Mathias Declercq [1] — 60,291
	SP.A: 135,212 (14.15%); 3 (—)	VB: 117,817 (12.33%); 3 (–1)			
1.	Dirk Van der Maelen [1] — 34,331	Guy D'Haeseleer [1] — 25,441			

==== Leuven (7 seats) ====
Major parties
	CD&V: 51,328 (16.26%); 1 (—)	GROEN!: 30,905 (9.79%); 1 (+1)	LDD: 9,907 (3.14%); 0 (–1)	N-VA: 85,399 (27.05%); 2 (—)	OPEN VLD: 45,814 (14.51%); 1 (–1)
1.	Carl Devlies [1] — 16,980	Eva Brems [1] — 12,549	Stef Goris — 1,797	Theo Francken [1] — 13,164	Gwendolyn Rutten [1] — 14,874
2.	Katrien Partyka — 10,057	Stijn Bex — 2,973	Natalie Theys — 1,045	Els Demol [2] — 7,933	Lorin Parys — 4,541
3.	Manu Claes — 7,297	Bernadette Stassens — 2,175	Steven Bruffaerts — 311	Hubert Keyaerts — 3,588	Freddy Vranckx — 3,615
4.	Izzy Van Aelst — 3,676	Paul De Troyer — 1,258	Sigrid Van Obbergen — 377	Hilde Kaspers — 5,299	Billy Reynders — 3,024
5.	Koen Van Roey — 2,538	Heidi Vanheusden — 2,282	Herman Pelgrims — 390	Luk Bellens — 3,039	Caroline Vangoidsenhoven — 4,057
6.	Wendy Colin — 2,871	Luc Robijns — 1,170	Ingrid Van Hoof — 501	Bart Nevens — 3,904	Paul Dams — 3,325
7.	Monique Swinnen — 8,350	Hermes Sanctorum — 1,914	Peter Reekmans — 905	Tine Eerlingen — 6,120	Patricia Ceysens — 9,518
(1)	Ingrid Claes — 7,986	Tie Roefs — 2,193	Natalie Theys — 756	Sonia Van Laere — 4,664	Eddy Poffe — 4,022
(2)	Andy Vandevelde — 2,413	Stef Boogaerts — 972	Tom Aerts — 315	Arnout Coel — 2,482	Anne Vangoidsenhoven — 2.844
(3)	Jo Pierson — 2,152	Philippe Bossin — 810	Gerarda Van De Vondel — 290	Katleen D'Haese — 3,517	Bram Bartholomees — 1,605
(4)	Edmond Feyfer — 1,947	Mieke Matthijs — 1,725	Mark Binon — 276	Frank Vannetelbosch — 2,444	Chris Jamar — 1,967
(5)	An Hermans — 4,103	Fons Creuwels — 819	Leen Flamand — 403	Annemie Minten — 3,068	Inge Willems — 2,090
(6)	Jan Laurys — 6,567	Betty Kiesekoms — 1,671	Dirk Vijnck — 387	Jos Verstraeten — 3.226	Ann Schevenels — 3,959
	SP.A: 56,176 (17.79%); 1 (—)	VB: 30,338 (9.61%); 1 (=0)			
1.	Bruno Tobback [1] — 25,713	Hagen Goyvaerts [1] — 5,084			
2.	Karin Jiroflee — 5,692	Christine De Winter — 5,396			
3.	Gino Debroux — 3,403	Andy Bonnyns — 1,625			
4.	Nicole Van Emelen — 3,705	Odette Van Brusselen — 1,637			
5.	Gunther Janssens — 2,764	Annick Vanacken — 1,888			
6.	Martine Vanbever — 2,862	Jos Claes — 1,471			
7.	Mohamed Ridouani — 4,806	Mark Moorhem — 1,439			
(1)	Griet Vandewijngaerden — 4,472	Nico Creces — 2,414			
(2)	Marc Florquin — 3,578	Anita Uyttebroek — 1,592			
(3)	Griet Verhenneman — 1,915	Maria Van der Bruggen — 1,111			
(4)	Fons Lemmens — 1,981	Maurice Elincx — 959			
(5)	Sofie Coomans — 2,542	Anita Vermeylen — 1,154			
(6)	Marcel Logist — 7,037	Felix Strackx — 1,459			
Minor parties
No.	LSP: 600 (0.19%); 0 (—)	PVDA+: 3,703 (1.17%); 0 (=0)	VRIJHEID: 1,576 (0.50%); 0 (—)		
1.	Jon Sneyers — 89	Wout Lootens — 609			
2.	Stefanie Deberdt — 69	Wiske Vingtcent — 299			
3.	Christophe De Brabanter — 56	Suzanne Luyten — 281			
4.	Miryam Mukandoli — 61	Lyvia Diser — 210			
5.	Giuseppe Raiselis — 42	Jimmy Crispeyn — 200			
6.	Irina Papadimitriou — 58	Danny Carleer — 198			
7.	—N/a	Lies Busselen — 333			

==== Limburg (12 seats) ====
Major parties
No.	CD&V: 100,643 (18.81%); 3 (—)	GROEN!: 25,754 (4.81%); 0 (=0)	LDD: 15,474 (2.89%); 0 (=0)	N-VA: 154,230 (28.83%); 4 (—)	OPEN VLD: 64,741 (12.10%); 1 (–1)
1.	Raf Terwingen [1] — 32,009	Toon Hermans — 5,581	Lode Vereeck — 3,194	Frieda Brepoels [1] — 43,729	Patrick Dewael [1] — 24,497
2.	L. Van der Auwera [3] — 17,939	Mieke Biets — 3,534	Sylvia Nijs — 1,292	Steven Vandeput [3] — 13,373	Hilde Vautmans — 15,068
3.	Gerald Kindermans — 15,506	Inan Asliyuce — 2,660			
4.	Ali Caglar — 12,980	Bert Stulens — 1,598			
5.	Katrien Timmers — 10,156	Kristien Kempeneers — 2,339			
6.	Rita Craenen — 9,089	Hugo Leroux — 1,594			
7.	Patrick Witters — 7,088	Riet Vanbillemont — 1,851			
8.	Lieve Vandeput — 8,623	Eddy Horions — 1,372			
9.	Nancy Bleys — 8,818	Lieve Vandeput — 2,190			
10.	Sonja Claes — 15,684	Annie Partyka — 1,957			
11.	Lode Ceyssens — 18,614	Marij Gabriels — 2,029			
12.	Ivo Belet [2] — 25,874	Ivo Thys — 1,672			
(1)	Gerald Kindermans — 11,176	Katrijn Conjaerts — 2,410			
(2)	An Christiaens — 9,900	Dirk Opsteyn — 1,156			
(3)	Raf Truyens — 8,584	Maarten Caubergh — 1,108			
(4)	Els Tiri — 6,209	Fermudiye Sagir — 1,319			
(5)	Nadja Vananroye — 6,789	Paul Driesen — 1,071			
(6)	Veerle Heeren — 15,624	Lieve Gelders — 1,687			
(7)	Jo Vandeurzen — 29,641	Derya Erdogan — 1,838			
	SP.A: 97,011 (18.14%); 2 (—)	VB: 68,413 (12.79%); 2 (=0)			
1.	Ingrid Lieten [1] — 23,205	Bert Schoofs [1] — 18,726			
2.	Peter Vanvelthoven [2] — 27,221	Annick Ponthier [2] — 7,682			

==== Luxembourg (4 seats) ====
Major parties:

	CDH	50,564 (31.41%)	2 (+1)	Benoît Lutgen
	Candidate		Votes	
1.	Benoît Lutgen [1]		33,038	
2.	Isabelle Poncelet [2]		11,466	
3.	Christiane Kirsch		6,200	
4.	André Bouchat		11,024	
(1)	Josy Arens		15,972	
(2)	Thérèse Mahy		8,023	
(3)	Annick Van den Ende-Chapellier		4,482	
(4)	Véronique Balthazard		5,718	
(5)	Elie Deblire		7,636	
(6)	Dimitri Fourny		10,670	

	ECOLO	18,853 (11.71%)	0 (=0)	Cécile Thibaut
	Candidate		Votes	
1.	Cécile Thibaut		4.346	
2.	Romain Gaudron		2,342	
3.	Annick Boidron		1,965	
4.	François Rion		1,776	
(1)	Jérôme Petit		1,662	
(2)	Isabelle Servais		1,995	
(3)	Paul De Favereau		1,300	
(4)	Annie Goffin		1,751	
(5)	Nicolas Stilmant		1,421	
(6)	Christina Dewart		1,684	

Major parties
No.	CDH	ECOLO: 18,853 (11.71%); 0 (=0)	FN: N/A; N/A	MR: 31,459 (19.54%); 1 (–1)	PS: 45,869 (28.49%); 1 (=0)
1.	Benoît Lutgen [1] — 33,038	Cécile Thibaut — 4.346	—N/a	Philippe Collard [1] — 12,124	Philippe Courard [1] — 22,899
2.	Isabelle Poncelet [2] — 11,466	Romain Gaudron — 2.342	—N/a	Anne Laffut — 7,824	Véronique Biordi — 8,333
3.	Christiane Kirsch — 6,200	Annick Boidron — 1,965	—N/a	Marie-Claude Weber — 3,569	Anne Davreux — 6,016
4.	André Bouchat — 11,024	François Rion — 1,776	—N/a	Michel Jacquet — 5,025	Francis Steifer — 7,191
(1)	Josy Arens — 15,972	Jérôme Petit — 1,662	—N/a	Benoît Piedboeuf — 6,254	André Perpete — 8,053
(2)	Thérèse Mahy — 8,023	Isabelle Servais — 1,995	—N/a	Chantal Rasse — 3,298	Stéphanie Heyden — 4,841
(3)	Annick Van den Ende — 4,482	Paul De Favereau — 1,300	—N/a	Cédric Bavay — 3,091	Olivier Weyrich — 4,825
(4)	Véronique Balthazard — 5,718	Annie Goffin — 1,751	—N/a	Mélissa Aubry — 4,835	Malika Sonnet — 5,567
(5)	Elie Deblire — 7,636	Nicolas Stilmant — 1,421	—N/a	Marielle Noel — 2,973	Marie Neuberg — 4,991
(6)	Dimitri Fourny — 10,670	Christina Dewart — 1,684	—N/a	Yves Evrard — 4,794	Sébastian Pirlot — 13,015
Minor parties
	BUB	FDG	MSPLUS	PP	PTB+
1.	Gérard Poncelet — 455	Nicole Cahen — 201	Olivier Califano — 28	Didier Vanderbiest — 874	Myriam Dulieu — 207
2.	Gilberte Bovy — 176	Bernard Diez — 103	Claire Libioul — 22	Viviane Desvaux — 441	Rafik Rassaa — 100
3.	Florence de Hemptinne — 240	Vittoria Del Debbio — 98	Eric Cuyx — 14	Luc Charlet — 415	Françoise Pasquier — 111
4.	Jean-Marie Baltus — 218	Michel Donceel — 101	—N/a	Edwige Gerard — 447	Christian Lekane — 90
(1)	—	—	—	—	Daniel Zamora — 111
(2)	—	—	—	—	Gertrude Roemans — 72
(3)	—	—	—	—	Mathieu Wellens — 70
(4)	—	—	—	—	Godelieve Vandamme — 72
(5)	—	—	—	—	Kristiaan Hertogen — 57
(6)	—	—	—	—	Guillemine Fillieux — 79

==== West Flanders (16 seats) ====
Major parties
	CD&V: 180,702 (23.01%); 4 (—)	GROEN!: 49,533 (6.31%); 1 (=0)	LDD: 60,210 (7.67%); 1 (–1)	N-VA: 188,317 (23.98%); 4 (—)	OPEN VLD: 106,265 (13.53%); 2 (–1)
1.	Yves Leterme [1] — 101,830	Wouter De Vriendt [1] — 11,302	Jean-Marie Dedecker [1] — 32,514	Geert Bourgeois [1] — 45,848	V. Van Quickenborne [1] — 45,196
	SP.A: 118,803 (15.13%); 3 (—)	VB: 71,200 (9.07%); 1 (–1)			
1.	Renaat Landuyt [1] — 38,216	Peter Logghe [1] — 10,563			

== Senate ==
Seat distribution		After 2007 election	After 2010 election
1.	CD&V	7 / 40	4 / 40
2.	MR	6 / 40	4 / 40
3.	OPEN VLD	5 / 40	4 / 40
3.	VLAAMS BELANG	5 / 40	3 / 40
5.	PS	4 / 40	7 / 40
5.	SP.A	4 / 40	4 / 40
7.	CDH	2 / 40	2 / 40
7.	ECOLO	2 / 40	2 / 40
7.	N-VA	2 / 40	9 / 40
10.	FN	1 / 40	0 / 40
10.	GROEN!	1 / 40	1 / 40
10.	LDD	1 / 40	0 / 40

=== Electoral colleges ===
==== Dutch-speaking (25 seats) ====
Major parties
	CD&V: 646,375 (16.15%); 4 (—)	GROEN!: 251,546 (6.28%); 1 (=0)	LDD: 130,779 (3.27%); 0 (–1)	N-VA: 1,268,780 (31.69%); 9 (—)	OPEN VLD: 533,124 (13.32%); 4 (–1)
1.	Marianne Thyssen [1] — 322,540	Freya Piryns [1] — 52,719	Anne De Baetzelier — 37,939	Bart De Wever [1] — 785,776	Alexander De Croo [1] — 301,917
2.	Rik Torfs [2] — 143,603	Geert Lambert — 20,606	Kris Daels — 5,301	Helga Stevens [2] — 68,900	Nele Lijnen [2] — 37,641
3.	Sabine de Bethune [3] — 59,484	Fatiha Dahmani — 22,073	Britt Vreysen — 4,107	Louis Ide [3] — 50,348	Rik Daems [3] — 42,267
4.	Wouter Beke [4] — 44,810	Hugo Van Dienderen — 8,328	Jan Van Puyvelde — 3,717	Lieve Maes [4] — 47,737	Guido De Padt — 48,186
5.	Hugo Vandenberghe — 50,724	Eva Lauwers — 14,791	Anne Van Hoof — 4,083	Danny Pieters [5] — 41,385	Katia Della Faille — 27,025
6.	Els Schelfhout — 34,758	Arfan Saber — 8,124	Yves Andriessen — 2,907	Kim Geybels [7] — 42,618	Fons Borginon — 17,925
7.	Elke Tindemans — 49,349	Nancy Mbuyi Elonga — 11,560	Gianni Boone — 3,036	Elke Sleurs [8] — 42,598	Peter Borner — 13,567
8.	Peter Van Rompuy — 54,949	Paul Pataer — 5,873	Regina Vandenbroucke — 3,246	Bruno Vandicke — 28,080	Sabine Friederichs — 18,257
9.	Ria Decoopman — 24,729	Klara Bulckens — 10,128	Lieve Van Gompel — 3,110	Inge Faes [9] — 36,870	Simon Dewulf — 15,417
10.	Erik Gerits — 19,637	Bruno Lapauw — 5,742	Patrick Verduyckt — 2,672	Annemie Charlier — 33,145	Kristl Strubbe — 27,457
11.	Petra De Wilde — 22,904	Francine De Prins — 9,145	Kris De Maere — 2,447	Marie-Pierre Romsée — 27,950	Anne Lefevre — 17,255
12.	Dominique Dehaene — 42,407	Remi Heylen — 5,234	Suada Mulahasanovic — 2,538	Katleen Bury — 33,541	Björn Prasse — 14,048
13.	Danny Van Melkebeke — 17,241	Anne Provoost — 14,242	Yves Muylle — 2,562	David Geens — 26,164	Frederick Vandeput — 14,750
14.	Koen Van den Heuvel — 20,650	Tom Kestens — 7,659	Maria Leus — 2,620	Filip Daem — 24,773	Caroline Penders — 17,977
15.	Mariette Mulders-Janssen — 21,158	Joke Devynck — 13,789	Ives Hansoul — 2,069	Koen Dillen — 26,509	Liesbeth Festjens — 16,013
16.	Marc Wellens — 14,977	Toon Toelen — 5,149	Rudi Philtjens — 2,196	Bart Vandekerckhove — 24,272	Pinar Akbas — 13,538
17.	Conny De Spiegelaere — 18,819	Gerda Schotte — 8,538	Linda Schiffeleers — 2,580	Goedele Vermeiren — 29,944	Elisabeth Schraepen — 14,644
18.	Raf Drieskens — 18,223	Mike Van Acoleyen — 5,141	Sri Van Lishout — 2,080	Ine Tombeur — 29,222	Laurent De Meester — 12,969
19.	Marleen Joris — 19.894	Seppe Santens — 5,453	Nico Harboort — 2,245	Georges Defreyne — 22,142	Eva De Bleeker — 15,127
20.	Katrien Desomer — 21,298	Tilly Davidts — 7,236	Hugo Lammens — 2,276	Jos Van Elslande — 22,674	Koen Anciaux — 15,322
21.	Filip Lehoucq — 16,419	Steven Vromman — 7,130	Kathy De Wilde — 2,908	Herman Geyskens — 22,708	Fanny Decock — 14,576
22.	Annemie Deckers — 21,656	Lotte Scholiers — 9,059	Nicole Heirwegh — 2,410	Ingrid Reubens — 29,465	Anne Pede — 16,826
23.	Joachim Coens — 33,598	Luckas Van der Taelen — 10,827	Diane Geens — 2,427	Mia De Brouwer — 29,336	Jaak Gabriëls — 24,228
24.	Marie De Clerck — 35,181	Magda Aelvoet — 13,733	Jan Vandenbussche — 2,364	David Manaigre — 22,157	Roland Duchâtelet — 31,777
25.	Etienne Schouppe — 69,769	Wouter Van Besien — 19,022	Henk Dierendonck — 3,105	Philippe Muyters [6] — 44,282	Dirk Sterckx [4] — 55,676
(1)	Dirk Claes — 35,756	Johan Danen — 6,810	Noëlla Appermans — 3,917	Patrick De Groote — 33,008	Martine Taelman — 25,119
(2)	Els Van Hoof — 24,088	Annemie Vermeylen — 7,399	Willy Moors — 2,071	Liesbeth Homans — 25,536	Yoeri Vastersavendts — 12,822
(3)	Pieter Marechal — 14,221	Anne Dedrij — 5,922	Lut Everaert-De Bisschop — 1,808	Frank Boogaerts — 17,272	Ann Somers — 19,934
(4)	Caroline Van Gutschoven — 17,092	Tobias Ceulemans — 3,964	Eric Vanderperre — 1,666	Luc Sevenhans — 15,734	Laurent Hoornaert — 10,655
(5)	Joris Billen — 15,191	Sara Matthieu — 6,778	Walter Van Peeterssen — 1,548	Piet De Bruyn — 17,023	Yvonne Van Dooren — 11,198
(6)	Kristof Callens — 13,825	Herman Lodewyckx — 3,415	Jacqueline Deschrijvere — 1,762	Sabine Vermeulen — 21,561	Marie-Jeanne Herremans — 10,536
(7)	Kathleen Helsen — 19,462	Katrien Stynen — 6,530	Rony Kyndt — 1,618	Dirk Rochtus — 15,213	Chris Gaethofs — 9,439
(8)	Karen Kelchtermans — 17,752	Dirk Vanstinjan — 3,897	Dorine Demeulemeester — 1,984	Hilde Lefere — 18,286	Ruth Vandewalle — 10,634
(9)	Piet Buyse — 16,046	Liesbet De Weder — 6,055	Francisca Smets — 1,725	Erna Scheerlinck — 18,037	Frederic Convent — 9,168
(10)	Griet Coppe — 18,729	Philippe Mingels — 3,366	Jean-Paul Reekmans — 1,602	Veerle Stassijns — 19,837	Tom Ryken — 8,932
(11)	G. Vandermeersch — 14,863	Inge Jooris — 6,518	Leen Vanbrabant — 1,701	Anneleen Remans — 19,056	Elise Vermeiren — 12,071
(12)	Ludwig Caluwé — 19,254	Ummü Gülsüm Almaci — 9,461	Carine Mestdagh — 1,808	Monica Bruylandt — 17,947	Niki De Boeck — 11,424
(13)	Wivina Demeester — 34,564	Eddy Boutmans — 4,740	Bruno Vermeeren — 1,647	Guy Thys — 16,449	Norbert De Mey — 10,403
(14)	Jean-Luc Dehaene — 105,310	Bruno De Lille — 5,942	Thierry Vinck — 2,118	Bart De Nijn — 19,873	Jean-Luc Vanraes — 13,494
	SP.A: 613,079 (15.31%); 4 (—)	VB: 491,547 (12.28%); 3 (–2)			
1.	Johan Vande Lanotte [1] — 188,811	Filip Dewinter [1] — 200,024			
2.	Marleen Temmerman [3] — 66,226	Anke Van dermeersch [2] — 49,336			
3.	Bert Anciaux [4] — 54,752	Jurgen Ceder [3] — 18,981			
4.	Selahattin Kocak — 42,290	Nele Jansegers — 18,998			
5.	Monica De Coninck — 22,562	Karim Van Overmeire — 18,856			
6.	Liesbet Stevens — 19,236	Linda Vissers — 17,709			
7.	Jos Digneffe — 16,031	Frank Creyelman — 13,631			
8.	Annick Lambrecht — 20,668	Jan Laeremans — 15,448			
9.	Dylan Casaer — 14,022	An Braem — 14,146			
10.	Erik De Bruyn — 21,300	Annemie Peeters — 13,332			
11.	Freija Dhondt — 18,215	Koen Ooms — 12,102			
12.	Griet Lissens — 16,005	Barbara Bonte — 15,120			
13.	Angelo Bruno — 15,631	Wim Van Dijck — 12,429			
14.	Ans Persoons — 13,900	Johan Deckmyn — 11,349			
15.	Charly Boda — 10,749	Wim Wienen — 10,261			
16.	Andree Fosse — 11,025	Sonja Warpy — 11,251			
17.	Ives Goudeseune — 11,467	Katty Tournoij — 11,010			
18.	Sara De Potter — 15,810	Hilde Raman — 11,360			
19.	David Gelade — 10,828	Geert Smets — 10,282			
20.	Eefje Van Wortswinkel — 14,535	Christel Heylen — 11,163			
21.	Dirk De Wulf — 10,923	Patsy Durnez — 10,515			
22.	Sofie Van Tendeloo — 13,643	Karel Indeherberge — 9,621			
23.	Saïd El Khadraoui — 24,971	Hilde De Lobel — 11,490			
24.	Freya Van den Bossche — 52,195	Freddy De Gaever — 13,056			
25.	Frank Vandenbroucke [2] — 177,663	Hugo Coveliers — 20,315			
(1)	Fauzaya Talhaoui — 26,861	Yves Buysse — 18,634			
(2)	Guy Swennen — 19,582	Nele Jansegers — 12,585			
(3)	Dalila Douifi — 16,406	Frédéric Erens — 8,452			
(4)	Sam Van de Putte — 11,728	Werner Somers — 9,695			
(5)	Tom Germonpré — 11,393	Hilde Van Echelpoel — 9,308			
(6)	Gilbert Lambrechts — 10,143	Goedele Van Haelst — 8,377			
(7)	Bram De Geeter — 9,472	Veronique Doucet — 8,395			
(8)	Cris Rutten — 9,449	Roland Pannecoucke — 7,788			
(9)	Saban Gök — 12,809	Peter Pauwels — 7,518			
(10)	Moreen Dewolf — 10,519	Martine Decannière — 7,648			
(11)	Kelly Linsen — 11,102	Nadia Van Beughem — 7,691			
(12)	Fadoua El Ouakili — 12,517	Etienne Vlaminck — 7,565			
(13)	Jo De Clercq — 11,249	Reddy De Mey — 9,119			
(14)	Leona Detiège — 30,660	Marijke Dillen — 17,334			
Minor parties
	CAP: 6,254 (0.16%); 0 (=0)	LSP: 7,841 (0.20%); 0 (—)	PVDA+: 53,995 (1.35%); 0 (=0)		
1.	Manuel Chiguero Galindo — 479	Bart Vandersteene — 791	Tine Van Rompuy — 12,501		
2.	Tiny Mast — 289	Els Deschoemacker — 398	Luc Vandenhoeck — 2,239		
3.	Frank Lambrechts — 162	Geert Cool — 356	Nicole Naert — 2,409		
4.	Fabienne Albrechts — 143	Laura Gilles — 341	Frans Van Acoleyen — 2,402		
5.	Dirk Goegebeur — 111	Peter Delsing — 236	Zohra Othman — 3,623		
6.	Marie-Claire Bruggeman — 150	Liesbeth Delafaille — 262	Dirk Tricot — 1,522		
7.	Raf Verbeke — 168	Bart Van der Biest — 232	Lieve Franssen — 1,941		
8.	Sabine Dick — 197	Isabel Nuyttens — 243	Bert De Belder — 1,492		
9.	Elias Vlerick — 125	Amaury Vanhooren — 233	Lucie Van Crombrugge — 1,643		
10.	Rita Maes — 139	Soo Ra Vergeylen — 225	Ivo Flachet — 1,457		
11.	Frank Eggermont — 89	François De Brabanter — 246	Ilke Cabus — 1,671		
12.	Corinna Gielen — 155	Josiane David — 247	Dirk Cosyns — 1,481		
13.	Patrick Verweire — 109	Sven Dedeken — 278	Christiana Holsbeeks — 1,699		
14.	Kristien Laeremans — 163	Eline Ledent — 240	Mohamed Ali — 4,060		
15.	Marc De Smet — 132	Luc Wendelen — 215	Jef Bossuyt — 1,320		
16.	Mie Bode — 145	Tamara Saccasyn — 222	Samira Doukkali — 2,412		
17.	Theo Mewis — 116	Benoît Douchy — 202	Willem De Witte — 1,504		
18.	Sarah Vlerick — 175	Goedele Landuyt — 252	Milly Thoolen — 1,601		
19.	Abdelmajid Mahmoudi — 204	Kristof Bruyland — 227	Staf Henderickx — 1,749		
20.	Sylvie Degre — 132	Elisa Jansen — 236	Annemie Mels — 1,659		
21.	Bjorn Van Driessche — 115	Jan Vlegels — 241	Koen Hostyn — 1,337		
22.	Lies Merckx — 194	Lien Van Vossole — 266	Miriam D'Eer — 1,506		
23.	Guy De Jaeger — 129	François Bliki — 252	Peter Vanderleyden — 1,229		
24.	Gitte Peetermans — 165	Laura Bracke — 314	Angèle Weetjens — 1,692		
25.	Leon Vercruyssen — 245	Eric Byl — 399	Kris Merckx — 3,390		
(1)	Dirk Pauwels — 217	Els Deschoemacker — 334	Lydie Neufcourt — 2,218		
(2)	Kristien Laeremans — 120	Geert Cool — 216	Jan Vandeputte — 1,341		
(3)	Sabine Dick — 120	Laura Gilles — 212	Lily Trips — 1,348		
(4)	Guy De Jaeger — 102	Peter Delsing — 161	Ward Coenegrachts — 1,091		
(5)	Rita Maes — 127	Liesbeth Delafaille — 169	Gerda Verlinde — 1,233		
(6)	Bjorn Van Driessche — 93	Bart Van der Biest — 156	Romain Dierickx — 1,042		
(7)	Mie Bode — 120	Elisa Jansen — 200	Ella Wagemans — 1,284		
(8)	Michaël Termont — 92	Jan Vlegels — 163	Stan Vanhulle — 1,031		
(9)	Corinna Gielen — 124	Lien Van Vossole — 182	Riet Verspreet — 1,257		
(10)	Fred Guldentops — 101	François Bliki — 176	Urbain Camerlynck — 908		
(11)	Sarah Vlerick — 160	Laura Bracke — 203	Jozefine De Prins — 1,199		
(12)	Leon Vercruyssen — 113	Eric Byl — 204	Raf Jespers — 1,128		
(13)	Lies Merckx — 283	Eline Ledent — 275	Elly Van Reusel — 1,502		
(14)	Arne Reynaert — 564	Bart Vandersteene — 513	Jan Fermon — 2,166		

==== French-speaking (15 seats) ====
Major parties
No.	CDH: 331,870 (13.46%); 2 (=0)	ECOLO: 353,111 (14.32%); 2 (=0)	FN: N/A; 0 (–1)	MR: 599,618 (24.32%); 4 (–2)	PS: 880,828 (35.72%); 7 (+3)
1.	Francis Delpérée [1] — 107,589	Jacky Morael [1] — 60,327	—N/a	Armand De Decker [1] — 148,673	Paul Magnette [1] — 264,167
2.	Vanessa Matz [2] — 27,169	Claudia Niessen [2] — 24,416	—N/a	Dominique Tilmans [3] — 36,930	Marie Arena [2] — 77,706
3.	—	—	—N/a	François Bellot [4] — 34,280	Philippe Moureaux [3] — 80,418
4.	—	—	—N/a	—	Hassan Bousetta [4] — 37,817
5.	—	—	—N/a	—	Fabienne Winckel [5] — 28,033
6.	—	—	—N/a	—	—
7.	—	—	—N/a	—	—
8.	—	—	—N/a	—	—
9.	—	—	—N/a	—	Fatiha Saïdi [7] — 38,187
10.	—	—	—N/a	—	—
11.	—	—	—N/a	—	—
12.	—	—	—N/a	—	—
13.	—	—	—N/a	—	—
14.	—	—	—N/a	—	—
15.	—	—	—N/a	Louis Michel [2] — 127,878	Willy Demeyer [6] — 55,860
(1)	—	—	—N/a	—	—
(2)	—	—	—N/a	—	—
(3)	—	—	—N/a	—	—
(4)	—	—	—N/a	—	—
(5)	—	—	—N/a	—	—
(6)	—	—	—N/a	—	—
(7)	—	—	—N/a	—	—
(8)	—	—	—N/a	—	—
(9)	—	—	—N/a	—	—
