= List of members of the Senate of Belgium, 2010–2014 =

This is a list of members of the Belgian Senate during the 53rd legislature, after the elections of 2010. They are arranged alphabetically by type.

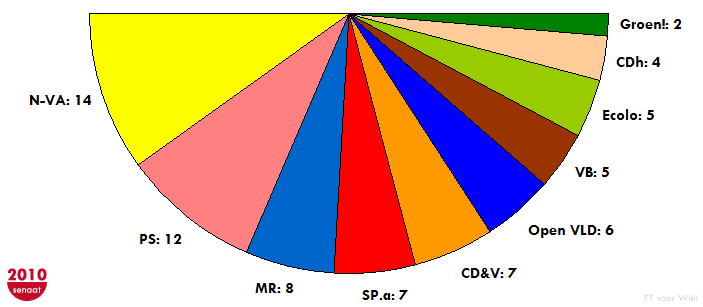
Seat division for the senate as of 2010.

== Seat division ==
Party	Seats by type			Total
Party	Directly elected	Community	Coopted	Total
New Flemish Alliance	9	3	2	14
Socialist Party	4	4	1	13
Reformist Movement	4	3	1	8
Christian Democratic and Flemish	4	2	1	7
Ecolo—Green!	3	3	1	7
Socialist Party–Different	4	2	1	7
Open Flemish Liberals and Democrats	4	1	1	6
Ecolo	2	2	1	5
Flemish Interest	3	1	1	5
Humanist Democratic Centre	2	2	–	4
Green!	1	1	–	2
	40	21	10	71

== Bureau ==
=== President and Vice-Presidents ===
Office	Senator	Party
President	Danny Pieters	N-VA
First Vice-president	Willy Demeyer	PS
Second Vice-president	Armand De Decker	MR
Third Vice-president	Helga Stevens	N-VA

=== College of Quaestors ===
Quaestor	Party
Wouter Beke	CD&V
Olga Zrihen	PS
Bert Anciaux	SP.A

=== Floor leaders ===
Floor leader	Party
Liesbeth Homans	N-VA
Philippe Mahoux	PS
Dominique Tilmans	MR
Sabine de Bethune	CD&V
Bart Tommelein	Open VLD
Johan Vande Lanotte	SP.A
Jacky Morael	Ecolo/Groen!
Jurgen Ceder	Vlaams Belang
Francis Delpérée	CDH

== Alphabetically ==
Senator	Party
Bert Anciaux	SP.A
Wouter Beke	CD&V
Frank Boogaerts	N-VA
Yves Buysse ← Dewinter	Vlaams Belang
Jurgen Ceder	Vlaams Belang
Rik Daems	Open VLD
Sabine de Bethune	CD&V
Alexander De Croo	Open VLD
Patrick De Groote ← De Wever	N-VA
Inge Faes	N-VA
Piet De Bruyne ← Geybels	N-VA
Louis Ide	N-VA
Nele Lijnen	Open VLD
Lieve Maes	N-VA
Danny Pieters	N-VA
Freya Piryns	Groen!
Luc Sevenhans	N-VA
Elke Sleurs	N-VA
Dirk Sterckx	Open VLD
Marleen Temmerman	SP.A
Marianne Thyssen	CD&V
Rik Torfs	CD&V
Johan Vande Lanotte	SP.A
Frank Vandenbroucke	SP.A
Anke Van dermeersch	Vlaams Belang
Marie Arena	PS
François Bellot	MR
Hassan Bousetta	PS
Armand De Decker	MR
Francis Delpérée	cdH
Willy Demeyer	PS
Gérard Deprez	MR
Paul Magnette	PS
Vanessa Matz	cdH
Jacky Morael	Ecolo
Philippe Moureau	PS
Claudia Niessen	Ecolo
Fatiha Saïdi	PS
Dominique Tilmans	MR
Fabienne Winckel	PS

== By type ==
=== Senators by Right ===
Senator	Party	Office entered
Prince Philippe	No affiliation	June 21, 1994
Princess Astrid	No affiliation	November 20, 1996
Prince Laurent	No affiliation	May 31, 2000

=== Directly elected senators ===
They have taken the oath of office on July 6, 2010.

==== Dutch electoral college (25) ====
Senator	Party
Bert Anciaux	SP.A
Wouter Beke	CD&V
Frank Boogaerts	N-VA
Yves Buysse ← Dewinter	VB
Jurgen Ceder	VB
Dirk Claes ← Thyssen	CD&V
Rik Daems	Open VLD
Sabine de Bethune	CD&V
Alexander De Croo	Open VLD
Patrick De Groote ← De Wever	N-VA
Inge Faes	N-VA
Kim Geybels (resigned)	N-VA
Louis Ide	N-VA
Nele Lijnen	Open VLD
Lieve Maes	N-VA
Philippe Muyters (resigned)	N-VA
Danny Pieters	N-VA
Freya Piryns	Groen
Elke Sleurs	N-VA
Dirk Sterckx	Open VLD
Marleen Temmerman (resigned)	SP.A
Rik Torfs	CD&V
Johan Vande Lanotte (resigned)	SP.A
Frank Vandenbroucke (resigned)	SP.A
Anke Van dermeersch	VB

==== French electoral college (15) ====
Senator	Party
Marie Arena	PS
François Bellot	MR
Hassan Bousetta	PS
Armand De Decker	MR
Francis Delpérée	cdH
Willy Demeyer	PS
Gérard Deprez ← Michel	MR
Paul Magnette	PS
Vanessa Matz	cdH
Jacky Morael	Ecolo
Philippe Moureau	PS
Claudia Niessen	Ecolo
Fatiha Saïdi	PS
Dominique Tilmans	MR
Fabienne Winckel	PS

=== Community Senators ===
They have taken the oath of office on July 13, 2010.

==== Flemish Community (10) ====
Senator	Party
Bart De Wever (resigned)	N-VA
Filip Dewinter	VB
Jan Durnez	CD&V
Cindy Franssen	CD&V
Liesbeth Homans (resigned)	N-VA
Ludo Sannen	SP.A
Helga Stevens	N-VA
Bart Tommelein (resigned)	Open VLD
Güler Turan	SP.A
Mieke Vogels	Groen

==== French-speaking Community (10) ====
Senator	Party
Jacques Brotchi	MR
Marcel Cheron	Ecolo
Christine Defraigne	MR
André du Bus de Warnaffe	cdH
Zakia Khattabi	Ecolo
Caroline Désir	PS
Muriel Targniom	PS
Olga Zrihen	PS
Richard Miller	MR
Dimitri Foudry	cdH

==== German-speaking Community (1) ====
Senator	Party
Louis Siquet	PS

=== Coopted Senators ===
They have taken the oath of office on July 20, 2010.

==== Dutch language group (6) ====
Senator	Party
Huub Broers	N-VA
Guido De Padt	Open VLD
Bart Laeremans	VB
Guy Swennen	SP.A
Peter Van Rompuy (resigned)	CD&V
Karl Vanlouwe	N-VA

==== French language group (4) ====
Senator	Party
Alain Courtois	MR
Ahmed Laaouej	PS
Philippe Mahoux	PS
Cécile Thibaut	Ecolo

== By political party ==
=== Dutch-speaking ===
==== New Flemish Alliance (14) ====
Senator	Type
Frank Boogaerts ← Stevens	Directly elected
Jurgen Ceder	Directly elected
Patrick De Groote ← De Wever	Directly elected
Inge Faes	Directly elected
Piet De Bruyn ← Geybels	Directly elected
Louis Ide	Directly elected
Lieve Maes	Directly elected
Danny Pieters	Directly elected
Luc Sevenhans ← Muyters	Directly elected
Elke Sleurs	Directly elected
Bart De Wever	Community
Liesbeth Homans (fraction leader, 2010–2013)	Community
Helga Stevens	Community
Huub Broers (fraction leader, 2013–present)	Coopted
Karl Vanlouwe	Coopted

==== Christian Democratic & Flemish (7) ====
Senator	Type
Wouter Beke	Directly elected
Dirk Claes ← Thyssen (fraction leader)	Directly elected
Sabine de Bethune	Directly elected
Rik Torfs	Directly elected
Jan Durnez	Community
Cindy Franssen	Community
Peter Van Rompuy	Coopted

==== Socialist Party–Different (7) ====
Senator	Type
Bert Anciaux (fraction leader)	Directly elected
Leona Detiège (October 2012) ← Temmerman	Directly elected
Johan Vande Lanotte	Directly elected
Frank Vandenbroucke	Directly elected
Ludo Sannen	Community
Güler Turan	Community
Guy Swennen	Coopted

==== Open Flemish Liberals and Democrats (6) ====
Senator	Type
Rik Daems	Directly elected
Alexander De Croo	Directly elected
Nele Lijnen	Directly elected
Martine Taelman ← Sterckx	Directly elected
Bart Tommelein (fraction leader)	Community
Guido De Padt	Coopted

==== Flemish Interest (4 (−1)) ====
Senator	Type
Yves Buysse ← Dewinter	Directly elected
Anke Van dermeersch (fraction leader)	Directly elected
Filip Dewinter	Community
Bart Laeremans	Coopted

==== Green (2) ====
Senator	Type
Freya Piryns (fraction leader)	Directly elected
Mieke Vogels	Community

==== Independent (1) ====
Senator	Type
Jurgen Ceder (since 2012)	Directly elected

=== French-speaking ===
==== Socialist Party (12/13) ====
Senator	Type
Marie Arena	Directly elected
Hassan Bousetta	Directly elected
Willy Demeyer	Directly elected
Christie Morreale ← Magnette	Directly elected
Philippe Moureaux	Directly elected
Fatiha Saïdi	Directly elected
Fabienne Winckel	Directly elected
Caroline Désir	Community
Muriel Targnion	Community
Olga Zrihen	Community
Ahmed Laaouej	Coopted
Philippe Mahoux (fraction leader)	Coopted

German speaking:

Senator	Type
Louis Siquet	Community

==== Reformist Movement (8) ====
Senator	Type
François Bellot	Directly elected
Armand De Decker	Directly elected
Gerard Deprez ← Michel	Directly elected
Dominique Tilmans	Directly elected
Jacques Brotchi	Community
Christine Defraigne (fraction leader)	Community
Richard Miller	Community
Alain Courtois	Coopted

==== Ecolo (5) ====
Senator	Type
Jacky Morael	Directly elected
Claudia Niessen	Directly elected
Marcel Cheron	Community
Zakia Khattabi (fraction leader)	Community
Cécile Thibaut	Coopted

==== Humanist Democratic Centre (4) ====
Senator	Type
Francis Delpérée (fraction leader)	Directly elected
Vanessa Matz	Directly elected
André du Bus de Warnaffe	Community
Dimitri Fourny	Community

== Changed during the legislation ==
=== Senators who chose not to sit ===
Name	Party	Type	Date	Replacement	Notes
Bart De Wever	N-VA	Directly elected senator	6 July 2010	Patrick De Groote	Stayed member of the Flemish Parliament (became community senator later on)
Filip Dewinter	VB	Directly elected senator	6 July 2010	Yves Buysse	Stayed member of the Flemish Parliament (became community senator later on)
Louis Michel	MR	Directly elected senator	6 July 2010	Gérard Deprez	Stayed member of the European Parliament
Helga Stevens	N-VA	Directly elected senator	6 July 2010	Frank Boogaerts	Stayed member of the Flemish Parliament (became community senator later on)
Marianne Thyssen	CD&V	Directly elected senator	6 July 2010	Dirk Claes	Stayed member of the European Parliament

=== Senators who resigned ===
Name	Party	Type	Date	Replacement	Notes
Kim Geybels	N-VA	Directly elected senator	31 August 2010	Piet De Bruyn	Because of personal reasons
Philippe Muyters	N-VA	Directly elected senator	9 July 2010	Luc Sevenhans	Stayed Flemish minister in Peeters II
Frank Vandenbroucke	SP.A	Directly elected senator	1 October 2011	Fauzaya Talhaoui	
Paul Magnette	PS	Directly elected senator	5 December 2011	Christie Morreale	Became federal minister in Di Rupo I
Güler Turan	SP.A	Community senator	22 December 2011	Fatma Pehlivan	
Marleen Temmerman	SP.A	Directly elected senator	18 October 2012	Leona Detiège	Became department head of WHO
Peter Van Rompuy	CD&V	Coopted senator	December 2012	Etienne Schouppe	Became member of the Flemish Parliament
Bart Tommelein	Open VLD	Community senator	January 2013	Jean-Jacques De Gucht	Became alderman in Ostend
Liesbeth Homans	N-VA	Community senator	January 2013	Vandaele or Jans	Became alderwoman in Antwerp
Bart De Wever	N-VA	Community senator	January 2013	Vandaele or Jans	Became mayor of Antwerp

== Sources ==
- "Huidige senatoren (alfabetisch)" (in Dutch). The Belgian Senate.
- "Sénateurs actuels (alphabétique)" (in French). The Belgian Senate.
- "Het Bureau" (in Dutch). The Belgian Senate.
- "Le Bureau" (in French). The Belgian Senate.
