= List of members of the Senate of Belgium, 2007–2010 =

This is the list of Belgian Senators from 2007 until the federal election of 2010, which was the 52nd legislature of the Senate.

== Seat division ==
Party	Seats by type			Total
Party	Directly elected	Community	Coopted	Total
Christian Democratic and Flemish — New Flemish Alliance	9	3	2	14
Christian Democratic and Flemish	7	2	2	11
Reformist Movement	6	3	1	10
Open Flemish Liberals and Democrats	5	2	2	9
Socialist Party	4	4	1	9
Flemish Interest	5	2	1	8
Ecolo—Green!	3	3	1	7
Socialist Party–Different	4	2	1	7
Ecolo	2	2	1	5
Humanist Democratic Centre	2	2	1	5
New Flemish Alliance	2	1	–	3
Green!	1	1	–	2
List Dedecker	1	–	–	1
National Front	1	–	–	1
	40	21	10	71

== Bureau ==
=== President and vice-presidents ===
Office	Senator	Party
President	Armand De Decker	MR
First Vice-President	Hugo Vandenberghe	CD&V
Second Vice-President	Marc Verwilghen → G. Verhofstadt	Open VLD
Third Vice-President	Yves Buysse	Vlaams Belang

=== College of Quaestors ===
Quaestor	Party
Myriam Vanlerberghe → A. Van Nieuwkerke → G. Lambert	SP.A
Tony Van Parys → E. Schouppe	CD&V
Olga Zrihen → A-M. Lizin	PS

=== Floor leaders ===
Floor leader	Party	Seats
Sabine de Bethune	CD&V	12
Dominique Tilmans → C. Defraigne	MR	10
Bart Tommelein → P. Wille	Open VLD	9
Philippe Mahoux	PS	8/9
José Daras → I. Durant	Ecolo/Groen!	8
Jurgen Ceder → J. Van Hauthem	Vlaams Belang	8
Johan Vande Lanotte → M. Vanlerberghe	SP.A	6
Francis Delpérée	cdH	5

== List ==
Name	National party	Electorate	Type
Wouter Beke	Christian Democratic and Flemish	Dutch-speaking	Directly elected
Yves Buysse ← Vanhecke	Flemish Interest	Dutch-speaking	Directly elected
Jurgen Ceder	Flemish Interest	Dutch-speaking	Directly elected
Hugo Coveliers	Flemish Interest (VLOTT)	Dutch-speaking	Directly elected
Sabine de Bethune ← Brepoels	Christian Democratic and Flemish	Dutch-speaking	Directly elected
Roland Duchatelet ← Verhofstadt	Open Flemish Liberals and Democrats (Vivant)	Dutch-speaking	Directly elected
Louis Ide	New Flemish Alliance	Dutch-speaking	Directly elected
Nele Jansegers ← Dewinter	Flemish Interest	Dutch-speaking	Directly elected
Geert Lambert	Green ← Spirit	Dutch-speaking	Directly elected
Nahima Lanjri	Christian Democratic and Flemish	Dutch-speaking	Directly elected
Nele Lijnen	Open Flemish Liberals and Democrats	Dutch-speaking	Directly elected
Freya Piryns ← Dua	Green	Dutch-speaking	Directly elected
Etienne Schouppe	Christian Democratic and Flemish	Dutch-speaking	Directly elected
Ann Somers ← De Gucht	Open Flemish Liberals and Democrats	Dutch-speaking	Directly elected
Marleen Temmerman	Socialist Party-Differently	Dutch-speaking	Directly elected
Elke Tindemans	Christian Democratic and Flemish	Dutch-speaking	Directly elected
Johan Vande Lanotte	Socialist Party-Differently	Dutch-speaking	Directly elected
Hugo Vandenberghe	Christian Democratic and Flemish	Dutch-speaking	Directly elected
Pol Van Den Driessche ← Leterme	Christian Democratic and Flemish	Dutch-speaking	Directly elected
Anke Vandermeersch	Flemish Interest	Dutch-speaking	Directly elected
Lieve Van Ermen	List Dedecker	Dutch-speaking	Directly elected
Els Van Hoof ← Leterme ← Van Hoof ← Schouppe	Christian Democratic and Flemish	Dutch-speaking	Directly elected
Myriam Vanlerberghe ← Anciaux	Socialist Party-Differently	Dutch-speaking	Directly elected
Tony Van Parys	Christian Democratic and Flemish	Dutch-speaking	Directly elected
Yoeri Vasteravendts ← Vankrunkelsven	Open Flemish Liberals and Democrats	Dutch-speaking	Directly elected
Marc Verwilghen	Open Flemish Liberals and Democrats	Dutch-speaking	Directly elected
Alain Courtois	Reformist Movement	French-speaking	Directly elected
Marie-Hélène Crombé-Berton ← Destexhe	Reformist Movement	French-speaking	Directly elected
Armand De Decker	Reformist Movement	French-speaking	Directly elected
José Daras	Ecology Party	French-speaking	Directly elected
Michel Delacroix	National Front	French-speaking	Directly elected
Francis Delpérée	Humanist Democratic Centre	French-speaking	Directly elected
Richard Fournaux	Reformist Movement	French-speaking	Directly elected
Benoit Hellings ← Durant	Ecology Party	French-speaking	Directly elected
Anne-Marie Lizin	Socialist Party	French-speaking	Directly elected
Philippe Mahoux	Socialist Party	French-speaking	Directly elected
Vanessa Matz ← Delvaux	Humanist Democratic Centre	French-speaking	Directly elected
Philippe Monfils ← Michel	Reformist Movement	French-speaking	Directly elected
Philippe Moureaux	Socialist Party	French-speaking	Directly elected
Franco Seminara ← Zrihen ← Busquin	Socialist Party	French-speaking	Directly elected
Dominique Tilmans	Reformist Movement	French-speaking	Directly elected
John Crombez ← Martens	Socialist Party-Differently	Dutch-speaking	Community senator
Jan Durnez ← Van den Brande	Christian Democratic and Flemish	Dutch-speaking	Community senator
Jean-Jacques De Gucht ← Hermans	Open Flemish Liberals and Democrats	Dutch-speaking	Community senator
Cindy Franssen ← Smet	Christian Democratic and Flemish	Dutch-speaking	Community senator
Fatma Pehlivan ← Van Nieuwkerke	Socialist Party-Differently	Dutch-speaking	Community senator
Helga Stevens	New Flemish Alliance	Dutch-speaking	Community senator
Bart Tommelein ← Wille	Open Flemish Liberals and Democrats	Dutch-speaking	Community senator
Joris Van Hauthem	Flemish Interest	Dutch-speaking	Community senator
Karim Van Overmeire	Flemish Interest	Dutch-speaking	Community senator
Luckas Vander Taelen ← Dua	Green!	Dutch-speaking	Community senator
Marcel Cheron	Ecology Party	French-speaking	Community senator
Christophe Collignon	Socialist Party	French-speaking	Community senator
André du Bus de Warnaffe ← Fremault ← Procureur	Humanist Democratic Centre	French-speaking	Community senator
Christine Defraigne	Reformist Movement	French-speaking	Community senator
Caroline Désir ← Bouarfa	Socialist Party	French-speaking	Community senator
Alain Destexhe	Reformist Movement	French-speaking	Community senator
Dimitri Fourny ← Elsen	Humanist Democratic Centre	French-speaking	Community senator
Zakia Khattabi ← Nagy ← Dubié	Ecology Party	French-speaking	Community senator
Caroline Persoons ← Roelants du Vivier	Reformist Movement	French-speaking	Community senator
Olga Zrihen ← Kapompolé	Socialist Party	French-speaking	Community senator
Louis Siquet ← Collas (MR/PFF)	Socialist Party	German-speaking	Community senator
Dirk Claes	Christian Democratic and Flemish	Dutch-speaking	Co-opted senator
Els Schelfhout	Christian Democratic and Flemish	Dutch-speaking	Co-opted senator
Guy Swennen	Socialist Party-Differently	Dutch-speaking	Co-opted senator
Martine Taelman	Open Flemish Liberals and Democrats	Dutch-speaking	Co-opted senator
Freddy Van Gaever	Flemish Interest	Dutch-speaking	Co-opted senator
Paul Wille ← Anthuenis	Open Flemish Liberals and Democrats	Dutch-speaking	Co-opted senator
Philippe Fontaine ← Brotchi	Reformist Movement	French-speaking	Co-opted senator
Jean-Paul Procureur ← Matz ← Dallemagne	Humanist Democratic Centre	French-speaking	Co-opted senator
Cécile Thibaut ← Russo	Ecology Party	French-speaking	Co-opted senator
Christiane Vienne	Socialist Party	French-speaking	Co-opted senator

=== Senators by Right ===
Senator	Party	Office entered
Prince Philippe	No affiliation	June 21, 1994
Princess Astrid	No affiliation	November 20, 1996
Prince Laurent	No affiliation	May 31, 2000
