= List of candidates in the 2009 European Parliament election in Belgium =

This is a list of all the candidates in the Belgian European Parliament election, held in 2009.

== European Parliament ==
=== Electoral colleges ===
==== Dutch-speaking (13 seats) ====
Major parties:

	CD&V	948,123 (23.26%)	3 (—)	Jean-Luc Dehaene
	Name of candidate	# of votes received		
1.	Jean-Luc Dehaene [1]	450,149		
2.	Marianne Thyssen [2]	187,303		
3.	Ivo Belet [3]	157,775		
4.	Nik Boons-Van Gool	32,266		
5.	Francis Stijnen	25,281		
6.	Anniek Nagels	32,943		
7.	Mustafa Uzun	24,817		
8.	Anja Pilet	30,135		
9.	Luc Millecamps	29,803		
10.	Franceska Verhenne	30,477		
11.	Christopher Oliha	18,125		
12.	Elke Tindemans	55,674		
13.	Etienne Schouppe	87,109		
(1)	Bart Dochy	39,589		
(2)	Anne Martens	38,490		
(3)	Jan Wouters	16,675		
(4)	Marilyn Neven	18,231		
(5)	Josseline Pansaerts	16,235		
(6)	Willem Rombaut	17,977		
(7)	Nahima Lanjri	25,087		
(8)	Yves Leterme	265,061		

	GROEN!	322,149 (7.90%)	1 (=0)	Bart Staes
	Name of candidate	# of votes received		
1.	Bart Staes [1]	97,036		
2.	Joke Van de Putte	28,556		
3.	Meyrem Almaci	28,806		
4.	Hugo van Dienderen	10,049		
5.	Maarten Tavernier	11,331		
6.	Rik Jellema	7,442		
7.	Sara Matthieu	18,248		
8.	Francine De Prins	12,230		
9.	Inan Asliyüce	11,763		
10.	Philippe Avijn	6,870		
11.	Tom Kestens	9,866		
12.	Tinne Van der Straeten	19,116		
13.	Vera Dua	39,725		
(1)	Wouter Van Besien	9,810		
(2)	Eva Lauwers	13,221		
(3)	Tom Declercq	5,807		
(4)	Karin Van Hoffelen	8,135		
(5)	Dirk Vansintjan	5,781		
(6)	Inge Jooris	10,106		
(7)	Wouter De Vriendt	8,652		
(8)	Magda Aelvoet	18,378		

	N-VA	402,545 (9.88%)	1 (—)	Frieda Brepoels
	Name of candidate	# of votes received		
1.	Frieda Brepoels	67,717		
2.	Flor Van Noppen	27,788		
3.	Elke Sleurs	19,575		
4.	Louis Ide	16,382		
5.	Hil D'Haese	11,585		
6.	Bart De Nijn	11,537		
7.	An Capoen	16,086		
8.	Fons Hamblok	9,964		
9.	Izolda Ferho-Baguirova	10,799		
10.	Bart Bauwens	10,340		
11.	Annemie Charlier	13,154		
12.	Geert Bourgeois	39,973		
13.	Bart De Wever [1]	218,605		
(1)	Frieda Brepoels	23,904		
(2)	Danny Pieters	9,503		
(3)	Tijl Waelput	7,146		
(4)	Reinilde Van Moer	8,646		
(5)	Els Demol	9,450		
(6)	Steven Vandeput	7,030		
(7)	Helga Stevens	13,934		
(8)	Mark Demesmaeker	30,864		

	OPEN VLD	837,884 (20.56%)	3 (=0)	Guy Verhofstadt
	Name of candidate	# of votes received		
1.	Guy Verhofstadt [1]	565,359		
2.	Annemie Neyts [2]	58,369		
3.	Dirk Sterckx [3]	100,226		
4.	Hilde Vautmans	32,390		
5.	Annick De Ridder	30,531		
6.	Davy Brocatus	20,645		
7.	Rik Remmery-Van Nieuwenhuyse	15,841		
8.	Martine Lesaffre	17,665		
9.	Caroline De Padt	33,228		
10.	Alexander De Croo	47,779		
11.	Margriet Hermans	31,621		
12.	Herman Schueremans	22,797		
13.	Roland Duchatelet	36,694		
(1)				
(2)				
(3)				
(4)				
(5)				
(6)				
(7)				
(8)				

	SP.A	539,393 (13.23%)	2 (—)	Kathleen Van Brempt
	Name of candidate	# of votes received		
1.	Kathleen Van Brempt [1]	146,992		
2.	Saïd El Khadraoui [2]	50,408		
3.				
4.				
5.				
6.				
7.				
8.				
9.				
10.				
11.				
12.				
13.	Bert Anciaux	71,919		
(1)				
(2)				
(3)				
(4)				
(5)				
(6)				
(7)				
(8)				

	VLAAMS BELANG	647,170 (15.88%)	2 (–1)	Frank Vanhecke
	Name of candidate	# of votes received		
1.	Frank Vanhecke [1]	161,371		
2.				
3.				
4.				
5.				
6.				
7.				
8.				
9.				
10.				
11.				
12.	Filip Dewinter [2]	150,584		
13.	Marie-Rose Morel	108,629		
(1)				
(2)				
(3)				
(4)				
(5)				
(6)				
(7)				
(8)				

Minor parties:

	CAP	6,398 (0.16%)	0 (—)	Raf Verbeke
	Name of candidate	# of votes received		
1.	Raf Verbeke	688		
2.				
3.				
4.				
5.				
6.				
7.				
8.				
9.				
10.				
11.				
12.				
13.				
(1)				
(2)				
(3)				
(4)				
(5)				
(6)				
(7)				
(8)				

	LDD	296,699 (7.28%)	1 (+1)	Jean-Marie Dedecker
	Name of candidate	# of votes received		
1.	Jean-Marie Dedecker [1]	149,768		
2.	Moniek Denhaen	10,629		
3.	Derk Jan Eppink	13,898		
4.				
5.				
6.				
7.				
8.				
9.				
10.				
11.				
12.				
13.	Rob Van de Velde	7,576		
(1)	Derk Jan Eppink	11,686		
(2)				
(3)				
(4)				
(5)				
(6)				
(7)				
(8)				

	LSP	8,985 (0.22%)	0 (=0)	Bart Vandersteene
	Name of candidate	# of votes received		
1.	Bart Vandersteene	1,153		
2.				
3.				
4.				
5.				
6.				
7.				
8.				
9.				
10.				
11.				
12.				
13.				
(1)				
(2)				
(3)				
(4)				
(5)				
(6)				
(7)				
(8)				

	PVDA+	40,057 (0.98%)	0 (=0)	Peter Mertens
	Name of candidate	# of votes received		
1.	Peter Mertens	6,981		
2.				
3.				
4.				
5.				
6.				
7.				
8.				
9.				
10.				
11.				
12.				
13.	Kris Merckx	3,849		
(1)				
(2)				
(3)				
(4)				
(5)				
(6)				
(7)				
(8)				

	SLP	26,541 (0.65%)	0 (—)	Nelly Maes
	Name of candidate	# of votes received		
1.	Nelly Maes	5,259		
2.				
3.				
4.				
5.				
6.				
7.				
8.				
9.				
10.				
11.				
12.				
13.				
(1)				
(2)				
(3)				
(4)				
(5)				
(6)				
(7)				
(8)				

==== French-speaking (8 seats) ====
Major parties:

	CDH	327,824 (13.34%)	1 (=0)	Anne Delvaux
No.	Name of candidate	# of votes received		
1.	Anne Delvaux [1]	124,718		
2.	Carlo Di Antonio	22,252		
3.	Vanessa Matz	20,745		
4.	Pierre Migisha	25,912		
5.	Isabelle Moinnet-Joiret	20,628		
6.	Amal Meqor	13,697		
7.	Michel Leclercq	13,700		
8.	Jean-Jacques Viseur	36,230		
(1)	Georges Dallemagne	27,674		
(2)	Marie-Eve Hannard	21,424		
(3)	Rodolphe Sagehomme	14,724		
(4)	Nese Acikgöz	10,710		
(5)	Simone Felix-De Gendt	10,674		
(6)	Francis Delpérée	50,361		

	ECOLO	562,081 (22.88%)	2 (+1)	Isabelle Durant
No.	Name of candidate	# of votes received		
1.	Isabelle Durant [1]	150,173		
2.	Philippe Lamberts [2]	26,430		
3.	Zaïna Ihirrou	26,718		
4.	Bartosz Lech	13,955		
5.	Nermin Kumanova	17,319		
6.	André Peters	15,950		
7.	Cécile Thibaut	29,124		
8.	Jacky Morael	48,849		
(1)	Inès Trepant	21,100		
(2)	Olivier Bierin	13,047		
(3)	Marie-Christine Lefebvre	18,697		
(4)	Jean-Claude Defosse	51,665		
(5)	Sandra Jen	16,226		
(6)	Jean-Michel Javaux	114,130		

	MR	640,092 (26.05%)	2 (–1)	Louis Michel
No.	Name of candidate	# of votes received		
1.	Louis Michel [1]	305,363		
2.	Frédérique Ries [2]	116,398		
3.	Olivier Chastel	74,616		
4.	Rachida Attar	17,991		
5.	Damien Thiery	32,874		
6.	Sophie Mathieu	26,012		
7.	Carine Gol-Lescot	19,759		
8.	Philippe Monfils	38,267		
(1)	Gérard Deprez	60,336		
(2)	Laetitia Brogniez	23,916		
(3)	Olivier Destrebecq	16,737		
(4)	Sophie Delettre	20,457		
(5)	Delphine Bourgeois	22,381		
(6)	Bernard Clerfayt	36,516		

	PS	714,947 (29.10%)	3 (–1)	Jean-Claude Marcourt
No.	Name of candidate	# of votes received		
1.	Jean-Claude Marcourt [1]	155,409		
2.	Véronique De Keyser [2]	61,024		
3.	Christiane Vienne	38,228		
4.	Patrick Moriau	52,493		
5.	Frédéric Daerden [3]	90,294		
6.	Valérie Deom	33,194		
7.	Fadila Laanan	52,782		
8.	Philippe Courard	70,246		
(1)	Marc Tarabella	50,993		
(2)	Simone Susskind	22,081		
(3)	Giovanna Corda	28,366		
(4)	Fabienne Winckel	24,753		
(5)	Nicolas Martin	28,104		
(6)	Philippe Busquin	59,362		

Minor parties:

	CAP D'ORAZIO	7,626 (0.31%)	0 (—)	Ezio D'Orazio
No.	Name of candidate	# of votes received		

	FN	87,706 (3.57%)	0 (=0)	Jean-Pierre Borbouse
No.	Name of candidate	# of votes received		

	LRC + PSL	7,954 (0.32%)	0 (—)	Céline Caudron
No.	Name of candidate	# of votes received		

	MS	4,939 (0.20%)	0 (—)	Francis Biesmans
No.	Name of candidate	# of votes received		

	PC + GE	7,533 (0.31%)	0 (—)	Pierre Eyben
No.	Name of candidate	# of votes received		

	PTB+	28,483 (1.16%)	0 (=0)	Raoul Hedebouw
No.	Name of candidate	# of votes received		

	RWF	30,488 (1.24%)	0 (=0)	Paul-Henry Gendebien
No.	Name of candidate	# of votes received		

	WDA	37,505 (1.53%)	0 (—)	Christian Haudegand
No.	Name of candidate	# of votes received		

==== German-speaking (1 seat) ====
Major parties:

	CSP	12,475 (32.25%)	1 (=0)	Mathieu Grosch
No.	Name of candidate	# of votes received		
1.	Mathieu Grosch [1]	4,762		
(1)	Pascal Arimont	2,482		
(2)	Olivia Nistor	567		
(3)	Fabienne Xhonneux	658		
(4)	Anne-Marie Küches	761		
(5)	Elmar Keutgen	1,187		
(6)	Christian Krings	1,550		

Minor parties:

	ECOLO	6,025 (15.58%)	0 (=0)	Claudia Niessen
No.	Name of candidate	# of votes received		
1.	Claudia Niessen	2,218		
(1)	Gregor Stangherlin	491		
(2)	Nathalie Espeel	320		
(3)	Benoît Lechat	245		
(4)	Christina Dewart	238		
(5)	Eddy Boutmans	187		
(6)	Elvira Hostert-Heyen	438		

	EDW	330 (0.85%)	0 (—)	Myrianne Coen
No.	Name of candidate	# of votes received		
1.	Myrianne Coen	71		
(1)	Antoon Van Loon	36		
(2)	Marie-Claire Gabriel	39		
(3)	Bertrand Hayez	23		
(4)	Myrianne Coen	31		
(5)	Philippe Goeseels	30		
(6)	Danielle Piana	57		

	PFF	7,878 (20.37%)	0 (=0)	Bernd Gentges
No.	Name of candidate	# of votes received		
1.	Bernd Gentges	2,910		
(1)	Heinz Keul	1,118		
(2)	Annabelle Mockel	717		
(3)	Erik Janssen	470		
(4)	Caroline Margrève	390		
(5)	Hans-Dieter Laschet	828		
(6)	Isabelle Weykmans	1,219		

	PRO DG	3,897 (10.07%)	0 (—)	Harald Mollers
No.	Name of candidate	# of votes received		
1.	Harald Mollers	1,494		
(1)	Dorothea Schwall-Peters	767		
(2)	Edgar Blum	249		
(3)	Sigrid Roobroeck	149		
(4)	Andrea Velz	390		
(5)	Philipp Gonay	230		
(6)	Arnold François	219		

	SP	5,658 (14.63%)	0 (=0)	Resi Stoffels
No.	Name of candidate	# of votes received		
1.	Resi Stoffels	1,946		
(1)	Alfred Ossemann	607		
(2)	Irene Kalbusch-Mertes	439		
(3)	Dany Huppermans	436		
(4)	Juliette Plottes	368		
(5)	Kirsten Neycken-Bartholemy	384		
(6)	Werner Baumgarten	817		

	VIVANT	2,417 (6.25%)	0 (—)	Josef Meyer
No.	Name of candidate	# of votes received		
1.	Josef Meyer	662		
(1)	Alain Mertes	289		
(2)	Gabriele Kringels	198		
(3)	René Davids	132		
(4)	Julie Bender	146		
(5)	Eliane Nix	241		
(6)	Michael Balter	544		
