= List of members of the Senate of Belgium, 2014–2019 =

This is a list of members of the Belgian Senate, arranged alphabetically by type, during the 54th legislature from 2014 until 2019. This was the first legislature following the sixth Belgian state reform, which abolished direct elections for the Senate and reduced its powers.

== Seat division ==
Party	Seats by type		Total
Party	Community	Co-opted	Total
New Flemish Alliance (N-VA)	10	2	12
Socialist Party (PS)	8	1	9
Christian Democratic and Flemish (CD&V)	7	1	8
Reformist Movement (MR)	7	1	8
Open Flemish Liberals and Democrats (Open Vld)	4	1	5
Socialist Party–Different (sp.a)	4	1	5
Humanist Democratic Centre (cdH)	3	1	4
Ecolo	2	1	3
Green (Groen)	2	1	3
Flemish Interest (Vlaams Belang)	2	—	2
German-speaking Community	1	—	1
	50	10	60

== List ==
Senator	Party	Language group	Appointment
Bert Anciaux	sp.a	Dutch	Co-opted
Anne Barzin	MR	French	Co-opted
Christophe Bastin	cdH	French	Co-opted
Jan Becaus	N-VA	Dutch	Co-opted
Geert Bourgeois	N-VA	Dutch	By and from the Flemish Parliament
Jacques Brotchi	MR	French	By and from the French language group of the Parliament of the Brussels-Capital Region
Karin Brouwers	CD&V	Dutch	By and from the Flemish Parliament
Ann Brusseel	Open Vld	Dutch	By and from the Flemish Parliament
Sonja Claes	CD&V	Dutch	By and from the Flemish Parliament
Cathy Coudyser	N-VA	Dutch	By and from the Flemish Parliament
Rik Daems	Open Vld	Dutch	By and from the Flemish Parliament
Sabine de Bethune	CD&V	Dutch	By and from the Flemish Parliament
Valérie De Bue	MR	French	By and from the Parliament of the French Community
Jean-Jacques De Gucht	Open Vld	Dutch	By and from the Flemish Parliament
Annick De Ridder	N-VA	Dutch	By and from the Flemish Parliament
Petra De Sutter	Groen	Dutch	Co-opted
Christine Defraigne	MR	French	By and from the Walloon Parliament
François Desquesnes	cdH	French	By and from the Walloon Parliament
Alain Destexhe	MR	French	By and from the Parliament of the French Community
Olivier Destrebecq	MR	French	By and from the Walloon Parliament
Guy D'haeseleer	Vlaams Belang	Dutch	By and from the Flemish Parliament
Nadia El Yousfi	PS	French	By and from the Parliament of the French Community
Yves Evrard	MR	French	By and from the Parliament of the French Community
Cindy Franssen	CD&V	Dutch	By and from the Flemish Parliament
Latifa Gahouchi	PS	French	By and from the Walloon Parliament
Brigitte Grouwels^{1}	CD&V	Dutch	By the Flemish Parliament from the Dutch language group of the Parliament of the Brussels-Capital Region
Philippe Henry	Ecolo	French	By and from the Walloon Parliament
Véronique Jamoulle	PS	French	By and from the French language group of the Parliament of the Brussels-Capital Region
Christophe Lacroix	PS	French	Co-opted
Anne Lambelin	PS	French	By and from the Walloon Parliament
Ingrid Lieten	sp.a	Dutch	By and from the Flemish Parliament
Lieve Maes	N-VA	Dutch	By and from the Flemish Parliament
Bertin Mampaka Mankamba	cdH	French	By and from the Parliament of the French Community
Elisabeth Meuleman	Groen	Dutch	By and from the Flemish Parliament
Alexander Miesen	PFF	German	By and from the Parliament of the German-speaking Community
Christie Morreale	PS	French	By and from the Parliament of the French Community
Philippe Muyters	N-VA	Dutch	By and from the Flemish Parliament
Jan Peumans	N-VA	Dutch	By and from the Flemish Parliament
Patrick Prévot	PS	French	By and from the Parliament of the French Community
Hélène Ryckmans	Ecolo	French	By and from the Parliament of the French Community
Katia Segers	sp.a	Dutch	By and from the Flemish Parliament
Elke Sleurs	N-VA	Dutch	By and from the Flemish Parliament
Martine Taelman	Open Vld	Dutch	By and from the Flemish Parliament
Cécile Thibaut	Ecolo	French	Co-opted
Güler Turan	sp.a	Dutch	By and from the Flemish Parliament
Wouter Van Besien	Groen	Dutch	By and from the Flemish Parliament
Pol Van Den Driessche	N-VA	Dutch	Co-opted
Anke Van dermeersch	Vlaams Belang	Dutch	By and from the Flemish Parliament
Bart Van Malderen	sp.a	Dutch	By and from the Flemish Parliament
Peter Van Rompuy	CD&V	Dutch	By and from the Flemish Parliament
Steven Vanackere	CD&V	Dutch	Co-opted
Wilfried Vandaele	N-VA	Dutch	By and from the Flemish Parliament
Karl Vanlouwe	N-VA	Dutch	By and from the Flemish Parliament
Lode Vereeck	Open Vld	Dutch	Co-opted
Johan Verstreken	CD&V	Dutch	By and from the Flemish Parliament
Christiane Vienne	PS	French	By and from the Parliament of the French Community
Jean-Paul Wahl	MR	French	By and from the Walloon Parliament
Véronique Waroux	cdH	French	By and from the Parliament of the French Community
Ben Weyts	N-VA	Dutch	By and from the Flemish Parliament
Olga Zrihen	PS	French	By and from the Walloon Parliament

=== Changes during the legislature ===
1. Bianca Debaets (CD&V), who became in July 2014 state secretary in the Brussels Government, was replaced by Brigitte Grouwels (the previous CD&V member of the Brussels Government) as senator.
2. Geert Bourgeois, Philippe Muyters and Ben Weyts (N-VA) became ministers of the Flemish Government in July 2014 and were therefore replaced as senators for the Flemish Parliament by respectively Piet De Bruyn, Andries Gryffroy and Jan Van Esbroeck.
3. Christophe Lacroix (PS) became minister of the Walloon Government juli 2014 and was therefore replaced as co-opted senator by Philippe Mahoux.
4. Elke Sleurs (N-VA) became state-secretary in the federal government Michel Government and will therefore be replaced as senator for the Flemish Parliament, with the successor still to be named.

== Bureau ==
=== President and Vice-Presidents ===
Office	Senator	Party
First Vice-President		
Second Vice-President		
Third Vice-President		

=== College of Quaestors ===
Quaestor	Party

=== Floor leaders ===
Floor leader	Party
