= Schelfhout =

Schelfhout is a surname. Notable people with the surname include:

- Andreas Schelfhout (1787–1870), Dutch painter, etcher, and lithographer
- Els Schelfhout (born 1967), Belgian politician
- Willem Schelfhout (1874–1951), Dutch chess master
