= Swennen =

Swennen is a surname. Notable people with the surname include:

- Guy Swennen (born 1956), Belgian politician
- René Swennen (1942–2017), Belgian writer
- Sandra Swennen (born 1973), Belgian athlete
- Walter Swennen (1946–2025), Belgian painter
