= Ine Tombeur =

Belgian politician

Member of the Flemish Parliament
- Incumbent
- Assumed office 9 June 2024
- Incumbent
- Assumed office 9 June 2024

Personal details
- Born: 1 April 1977 (age 49) Neerpelt, Belgium
- Party: New Flemish Alliance (2001-present); Volksunie (before 2001)

Ine Tombeur (born 1 April, 1977 in Neerpelt) is a Belgian politician of the New Flemish Alliance party who has served as a Member of the Flemish Parliament since 2024 for the Flemish Brabant region.

== Biography ==
Tombeur graduated with a degree in speech therapy from the Artevelde University of Applied Sciences in Ghent and worked as a speech therapist until 2010.

She became involved in politics as a member of the Volksuniejongeren (VUJO), the youth-wing of the Flemish Volksunie party. In 2000, she stood as a candidate in Limburg for the Volksunie during the provincial elections that year but was not elected. In 2001, she was a founding member of the N-VA. In 2010, she became active in full-time politics and was the regional coordinator for the N-VA in East Flanders from 2010 to 2015. She then worked as an advisor for N-VA MPs Elke Sleurs and Zuhal Demir from 2015 to 2018 and was a spokesperson for the Flemish Brabant provincial governor Jan Spooren from 2020 to 2024. In 2012, she was also elected as a municipal councilor in Tienen. For the 2024 Belgian regional elections, Tombeur was elected to the Flemish Parliament.
