= Lies Jans =

Belgian politician

Member of the Flemish Parliament
- Incumbent
- Assumed office 7 June 2009

Personal details
- Born: 20 January 1974 (age 52) Anderlecht, Brussels-Capital Region
- Party: N-VA
- Website: http://www.n-va.be/cv/lies-jans

Lies Jans (born 20 January 1974, in Anderlecht) is a Belgian politician and is affiliated to the N-VA. She was elected as a member of the Flemish Parliament in 2009.
