= Jean-Paul Procureur =

Belgian politician (born 1952)

Senator
- In office 5 July 2007 – June 2009

Personal details
- Born: 6 February 1952 (age 74) Wasmes-Audemez-Briffœil, Belgium
- Party: Centre démocrate humaniste
- Website: www.jpprocureur.be

Jean-Paul Procureur (French pronunciation: [ʒɑ̃ pɔl pʁɔkyʁœʁ]; born 6 February 1952) is a Belgian politician and a member of the Centre démocrate humaniste. He was a member of the Belgian Senate between 2007 and 2009.
