= Leona Detiège =

Belgian politician (born 1942)

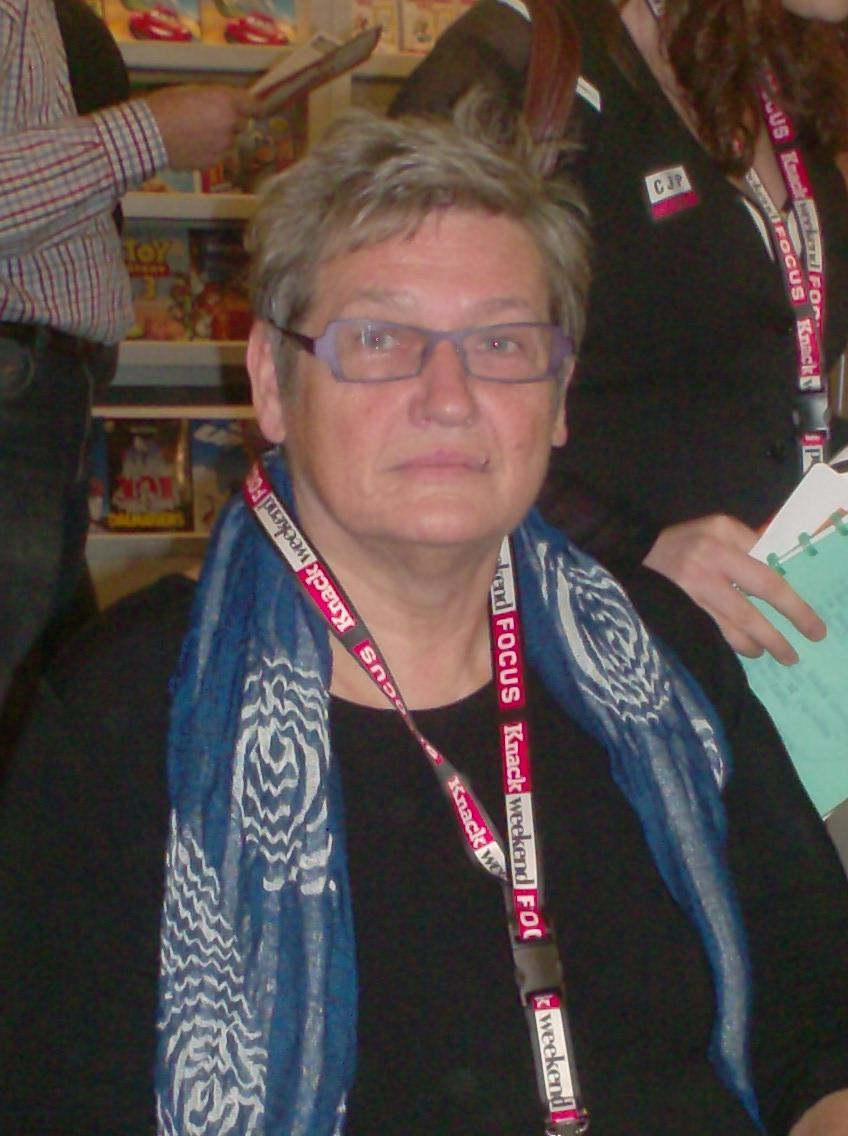
Leona Detiège in 2010

Leona Maria Detiège (born Antwerp, 26 November 1942) is a Belgian politician.

Detiège was a member of the Belgian Socialist Party and is still a member of its successor Flemish social-democratic party. Until 2014, she was a federal senator, succeeding Marleen Temmerman in October 2012. From 1995 till 2003 she was Mayor of Antwerp.

Detiège was born in Antwerp. Her father, Frans Detiège, had also served as Mayor of Antwerp, while her daughter, Maya Detiège, served as a federal representative.

== Career ==
Detiège was a civil servant at the Belgian ministry of Economic Affairs, at the economic planning office, head-master of the "Volkshogeschool Emile Vandervelde" (adult-university, evening classes) in Antwerp. From 1970 to 1974 she worked for several ministers as cabinetcollaborator.

Political mandates :

1974 - 1977 : member of the Provincial Council of Antwerp Province.
1977 - 1991 : member of Parliament, MP
1977 - 1980 : Cultural council for the Dutch-speaking community predecessor for the Flemish Parliament,
1980 - 1988 : member of the Benelux Interparliamentary Consultative Council
1980 - 1995 : member of the Vlaamse Raad or later Flemish Parliament
1988 - 1992 : federal Secretary of State#Belgium for pensions
1991 - 1995 : member of Senate
1992 - 1995 : Flemish minister of employment and social affairs
1995 - 2003 : Mayor or burgemaster of Antwerp. she left that post in 2003 but remained from 1995 till 2006 counselor.

Detiège holds the title of Commandeur in the Order of Leopold.
