= José Daras =

Belgian politician

Senator
- In office 28 June 2007 – June 2011

Personal details
- Born: 28 May 1948 (age 77) Malonne
- Party: Ecolo
- Website: https://josedaras.blogspot.ca

José Daras (born 28 May 1948 in Malonne) is a Belgian politician and a member of Ecolo.

== Early professional career ==
Before dedicating his life to his political career, José Daras taught geography during 10 years.

== Political career ==
He is one of the founder of the green party Ecolo, created in 1980.

From 1981 to 1999, He was a member of the Belgian federal parliament.

He was minister of transports, energy and mobility in the Walloon government from 1999 to 2004.

He was elected as a member of the Belgian Senate in 2007.
