= Patrick De Groote =

Belgian politician

Senator
- Incumbent
- Assumed office 6 July 2010

Personal details
- Born: 13 October 1958 (age 67) Bruges, West Flanders
- Party: New Flemish Alliance
- Website: http://www.n-va.be/cv/patrick-de-groote

Patrick De Groote (born 13 October 1958 in Bruges) is a Belgian politician and is affiliated with the New Flemish Alliance. He was elected as a member of the Belgian Senate in 2010.
