= Karim Van Overmeire =

Belgian politician

Aalst Alderman's College
- In office 2013–...

Personal details
- Born: 14 October 1964 (age 61) Ghent, East Flanders, Belgium
- Party: N-VA (2011-present)
- Other political affiliations: Vlaams Blok (1991-2004); Vlaams Belang (2004-2010)
- Website: www.karimvanovermeire.be

Karim Van Overmeire (born 14 October 1964) is a Flemish politician, author, city planner and member of the New Flemish Alliance party.

Karim Van Overmeire has a law degree from the University of Ghent. In 1990, he became a board member of the Vlaams Blok Jongeren, the youth wing of the former Vlaams Blok party, in East Flanders and from 1992 to 1995 he was national chairman of the VBJ.

In 1991, he was elected to the Belgian Chamber of Representatives for Vlaams Blok and in 1995, became a member of the Flemish Parliament for Vlaams Blok and later Vlaams Belang. In 1996, Overmeire was involved in writing the controversial 70-point plan which was criticised by opposition politicians as racist. From 2004 to 2010, he chaired the committee of Foreign Affairs of the Flemish Parliament.

In 2010, he left Vlaams Belang and joined the New Flemish Alliance (N-VA) in 2011. After having been a member of different parliaments for 28 years, he decided not to stand in the 2019 elections.

He was a member of the European Alliance Group at the European Committee of the Regions. He was also a member of the Parliamentary Assembly (2004–2010) and the Congress of Local and Regional Authorities of the Council of Europe. In that capacity, he served as an election observer in different countries, including Georgia, Albania, Serbia, Bosnia, Kyrgyzstan and North Macedonia.

Karim Van Overmeire lives in Aalst. Since 1995, he was continuously elected in the city council. In 2013, he was elected as 2nd Alderman in the city board, responsible for education, the local library, heritage and museum, integration and international relations. Under his leadership, Utopia was built: a combination of library and academy, named after Thomas More's perfect imaginary world. In 2019, Utopia was awarded the title of best library in Flanders. After the 2018 elections, Karim Van Overmeire was confirmed in the city board as 1st Alderman.

Karim Van Overmeire is author of several books on Flemish politics, heritage and history.

Bibliography

- Eén Tegen Allen (1993)
- Project Vlaamse Staat: een strategie naar onafhankelijkheid (1998)
- De Guldensporenslag: het verhaal van een onmogelijke gebeurtenis (2001)
- Het Verloren Vaderland (2005)
- Vlaanderen onafhankelijk. Hoe moet dat dan? (2007)
- Het Verdriet van de Zwarte Man. Een rondleiding achter de coulissen van de Aalsterse politiek (2011)
- Honderd keer Vlaanderen. Straffe verhalen over het volk tussen Noordzee en Maas (2018)
