= Anne Delvaux =

Belgian politician

Senator
- In office 28 June 2007 – June 2011

Personal details
- Born: 20 October 1970 (age 55) Liège
- Party: cdH

Anne Delvaux (French: [dɛlvo]; born 20 October 1970 in Liège) is a Belgian politician and a member of the cdH. She was elected as a member of the Belgian Senate in 2007.
