= Ingrid Lieten =

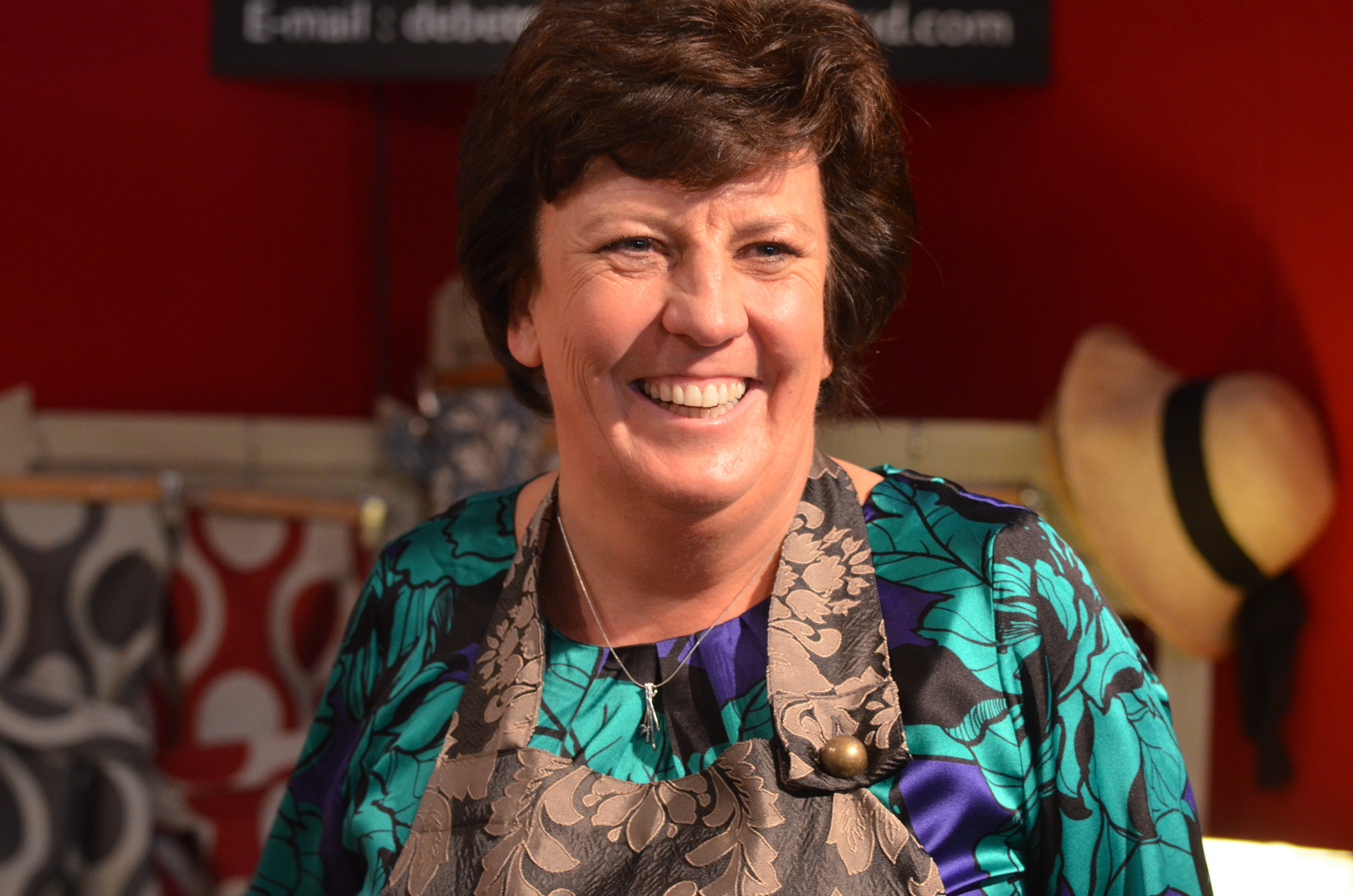
- Ingrid Lieten in 2013

Flemish Minister of Innovation and Media
- In office 13 July 2009 – 25 July 2014

Personal details
- Born: 20 April 1964 (age 62) Hasselt
- Party: SP.A

Ingrid Lieten (born 20 April 1964, Hasselt) is a Flemish politician and former minister for Innovation, Public Investment, Media and Poverty Reduction in the Flemish Government for the Socialist Party – Different.

She studied jurisprudence at the VUB and became a lawyer with the bar association of Brussels and Hasselt. A couple of years later, she obtained a master's degree in Industrial Location and Development.

On 1 January 2002, Lieten became CEO of De Lijn, the Flemish national bus company. She left the company in 2009. On 13 July 2009, Lieten was appointed Minister for Innovation, Public Investment, Media and Poverty Reduction in the Flemish Government by her party, the Socialist Party – Different (sp-a). Lieten was also the Flemish vice-premier, alongside N-VA politician Geert Bourgeois.

In February 2011, Lieten caused a stir in the Flemish Government, after she called her fellow ministers "insensitive caricatures made of Teflon and concrete" in a leaked email.

== Honours ==
- 2014: commander in the Order of Leopold.
