= Nele Jansegers =

Belgian politician (born 1965)

Senator
- In office 28 June 2007 – June 2011

Personal details
- Born: 17 October 1965 (age 60) Aalst, Belgium
- Party: Vlaams Belang

Nele Jansegers (born 1965) is a Belgian politician and a member of the Vlaams Belang. She was elected as a member of the Belgian Senate in 2007.
