= Willy Demeyer =

Belgian politician (born 1959)

Vice-President of the Socialist Party
- Incumbent
- Assumed office 6 December 2011

Member of the Chamber of Representatives
- In office 19 June 2014 – 1 September 2017

Mayor of Liège
- Incumbent
- Assumed office 15 September 1999
- Preceded by: Jean-Maurice Dehousse

Personal details
- Born: 17 March 1959 (age 67) Liège, Belgium
- Party: Socialist Party
- Education: University of Liège

Willy Demeyer (born 17 March 1959) is a Belgian politician. He is the mayor of Liège since 1999 and has served as the Vice-President of the Socialist Party since 6 December 2011. He also served as a deputy in the Chamber of Representatives for the Socialist Party between June 2014 and September 2017.

== Honours ==
- 2005: Knight of the Legion of Honour
- 2014: Officer of the Legion of Honour
