= Kim Geybels =

Belgian politician (born 1981)

Senator
- In office 6 July 2010 – 31 August 2010

Personal details
- Born: 29 October 1981 (age 44) Herk-de-Stad, Limburg (Belgium)
- Party: None
- Other party: N-VA (2008-2010)
- Website: http://www.kimgeybels.be

Kim Geybels (born 29 October 1981 in Herk-de-Stad) is a Belgian politician and a former member of the Belgian Senate for the N-VA and is a former chairman of the youth wing of the N-VA. Soon after her resignation (caused by incident in Thailand involving narcotics) she tried to retrieve her seat as Senator, claiming she was "forced" by the N-VA to resign. Early October 2010 all procedures, as started by Geybels, to retrieve her Senate seat had failed.

== Political career ==
During the 2006 Belgian provincial and municipal elections Geybels did not get elected into the Municipal Council of Lummen for Lumineus Lummen.

In April 2008 Geybels was elected into the (national) N-VA party council.

Geybels was a candidate for the Flemish Parliament during the 2009 Belgian regional elections; but was not elected.

Geybels was elected as a member of the Belgian Senate in the 2010 Belgian general election in June 2010. On 19 July 2010 Geybels was chosen temporary chairman of the youth wing of the N-VA (Geybels had been Vice Chairman). On 31 August 2010 Geybels resigned on personal grounds (as asked by the N-VA) as senator and as chairman of the youth wing of the N-VA. After her resignation Geybels stated (on 1 September 2010) she and a travel companion had been blackmailed by local drug mafia during a trip to Thailand; she also stated she remained a member of the N-VA, but did not comment on her political future. The N-VA also found it unacceptable she had hired her travel companion to Thailand as a personal assistant in the Senate as he was not screened by the party (he was also previously fired by the N-VA as an assistant of the Speaker of the Flemish Parliament Jan Peumans). Geybels soon emphasised she "is not responsible for actions of travel companions". Geybels was succeeded as senator by Piet De Bruyn. As of 2 September 2010 the website of N-VA did not list her as member of the (national) N-VA party council (her successor as Senator Piet De Bruyn was listed as member).

On 6 September 2010 Geybels demanded her mandate as Senator back, claiming she was forced to resign by N-VA leaders, and started the procedure to retrieve it. If Geybels would return as a Senator she will not be accepted into the N-VA faction.

Early October 2010 the N-VA suspended Geybels membership of the party and all legal procedures to retrieve her Senate mandate had failed.

== European Court of Human Rights case ==
Following the final Senate decision on her resignation, Geybels complained to the European Court of Human Rights. After more than eight years, a Chamber of the Court judged that the procedures governing the resignation of senators were not sufficiently clear, and did not protect against arbitrary proceedings. The Court found, amongst other things, that the Bureau deciding on the validity of Geybels' resignation had not heard her or asked her to submit her version of the case. Furthermore, two of the senators who Geybels claimed had tried to force her to resign, were members of the Bureau and had not recused themselves. Ultimately, the Court found a breach of the elections clause of the European Convention on Human Rights (Protocol 1, Article 3) and awarded her a compensation of 35.000 euro.

== Political positions ==
Geybels believes rights and obligations go hand-in-hand. Geybels sees good education, good healthcare and a social safety net as basic rights.
