= Pol Van Den Driessche =

Belgian politician

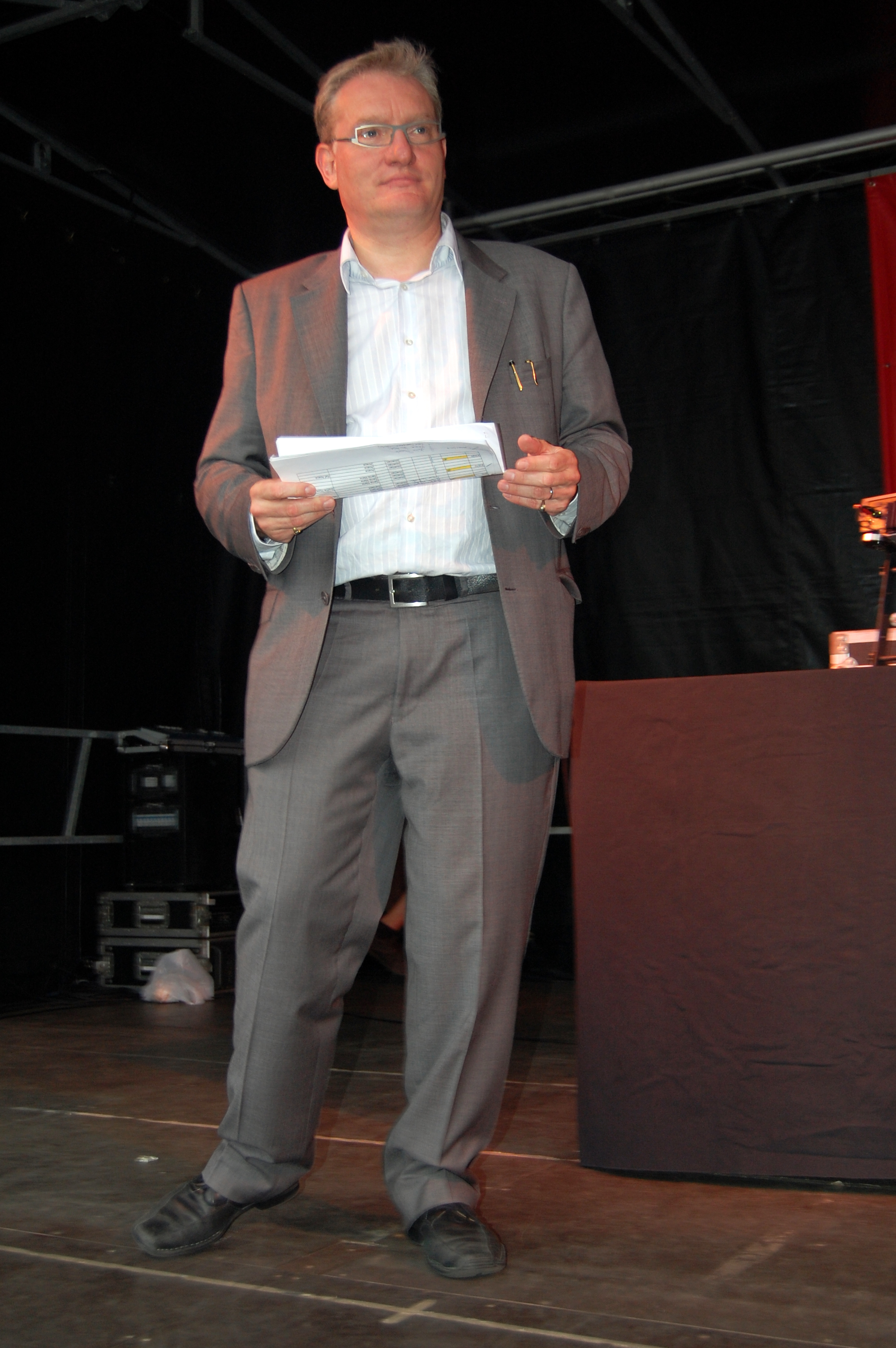
- Pol Van Den Driessche, 2008

Senator
- Incumbent
- Assumed office July 2014
- In office 28 June 2007 – June 2011

Personal details
- Born: 22 June 1959 (age 66) Oudenaarde
- Party: New Flemish Alliance
- Website: www.polvandendriessche.be

Pol Van Den Driessche (born 1959) is a Belgian ex-journalist, writer and politician.

Van Den Driessche joined with the Christian Democratic and Flemish party (CD&V) in 2007 and was elected as a member of the Belgian Senate in the same year. He moved to the New Flemish Alliance (N-VA) after ending his term, in 2011, and became a co-opted senator for this party in 2014.

In 2012, Van Den Driessche stood down as a candidate in the local elections in Bruges after being accused of sexual abuse. On 7 August 2014, he made the papers because he tried to edit or mitigate references to these accusations on his Dutch Wikipedia page. In the 2018 local elections he led the N-VA list in Bruges. He got elected as a council member, but his party suffered a big loss in the city.
