= Frank Boogaerts =

Belgian politician

Senator
- Incumbent
- Assumed office 6 July 2010

Personal details
- Born: 16 November 1944 (age 81) Lier, Antwerp
- Party: N-VA
- Website: http://www.n-va.be/cv/frank-boogaerts

Frank Boogaerts (born 16 November 1944 in Lier) is a Belgian politician and is affiliated to the N-VA. He was elected as a member of the Belgian Senate in 2010.

Frank lives in Lier, where he has been active in local politics for over the last 36 years. On January first of 2013 he became the Mayor of Lier.
