= Inge Faes =

Belgian politician (born 1973)

Senator
- Incumbent
- Assumed office 6 July 2010

Personal details
- Born: 29 May 1973 (age 53) Hamme, East Flanders
- Party: N-VA
- Website: http://www.n-va.be/cv/inge-faes

Inge Faes (born 29 May 1973 in Hamme) is a Belgian politician and is affiliated to the N-VA. She was elected as a member of the Belgian Senate in 2010.
