= Freya Piryns =

Belgian politician

Belgian Senator
- In office 28 June 2007 – 12 June 2010
- Incumbent
- Assumed office 13 June 2010

Personal details
- Born: 26 August 1976 (age 49) Wilrijk (Antwerp)
- Party: Groen

Freya Piryns is a former Belgian politician and a member of the Groen political party.

== Biography ==
She was born in Antwerp, Belgium on August 26, 1976. Her mother is Flemish television and film actress, Mia Van Roy and her father is the journalist Peter Piryns.

== Career ==
She was elected Senator of the Belgian Senate in 2007 and reelected in 2010.

=== Timeline ===
- 10/06/2007 – : Senator [directly elected] (Dutch electoral college)
