= Jacky Morael =

Belgian politician

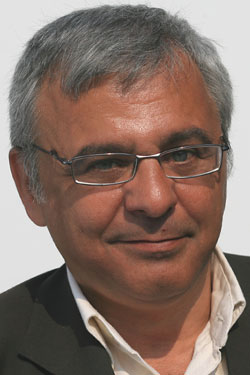

Member of the Chamber of Representatives
- In office 1991–1994

Member of the Senate
- In office 1999–2003, 2010–2014

Personal details
- Born: 26 November 1959
- Died: 6 December 2016 (aged 57)
- Party: Ecolo

Jacky Morael (26 November 1959 – 6 December 2016) was a Belgian politician.
