= Dirk Claes =

Belgian politician (born 1959)

Senator
- In office 12 July 2007 – June 2011

Personal details
- Born: 27 May 1959 (age 66) Leuven
- Website: www.dirkclaes.be

Dirk Claes (born 1959) is a Belgian politician and a member of the CD&V. He was elected as a member of the Belgian Senate in 2007.
