= Elke Tindemans =

Belgian politician (born 1961)

Senator
- In office 28 June 2007 – June 2011

Personal details
- Born: 22 May 1961 (age 65) Berchem
- Party: Christen-Democratisch en Vlaams
- Website: www.elketindemans.be

Elke Tindemans (born 1961) is a Belgian politician and a member of the CD&V. She was elected as a member of the Belgian Senate in 2007.
