= Jurgen Ceder =

Belgian politician

Senator
- In office 28 June 2007 – June 2011

Personal details
- Born: 11 June 1963 (age 62) Aalst, Belgium
- Party: N-VA
- Other political affiliations: Vlaams Blok Vlaams Belang

Jurgen Ceder (born 1963) is a Belgian politician and a member of the N-VA. He was first elected as a member of the Belgian Senate in 1995 for the Vlaams Blok party. In 2009, he became group leader in the senate for Vlaams Belang. In July 2012 he became a member of N-VA. Because he was associated with the 70-point plan drawn up with the Vlaams Blok party, it caused dissatisfaction among other prominent members of N-VA with some members calling on the party not to adopt him as a candidate.
