= Els Schelfhout =

Belgian politician (born 1967)

Senator
- In office 12 July 2007 – June 2011

Personal details
- Born: 19 May 1967 (age 59) Sint-Gillis-Waas
- Party: Christen-Democratisch en Vlaams

Els Schelfhout (born 1967) is a Belgian politician and a member of the Christen-Democratisch en Vlaams. She was elected as a member of the Belgian Senate in 2007.
