= Cindy Franssen =

Flemish politician (born 1976)

Cindy Franssen MEP
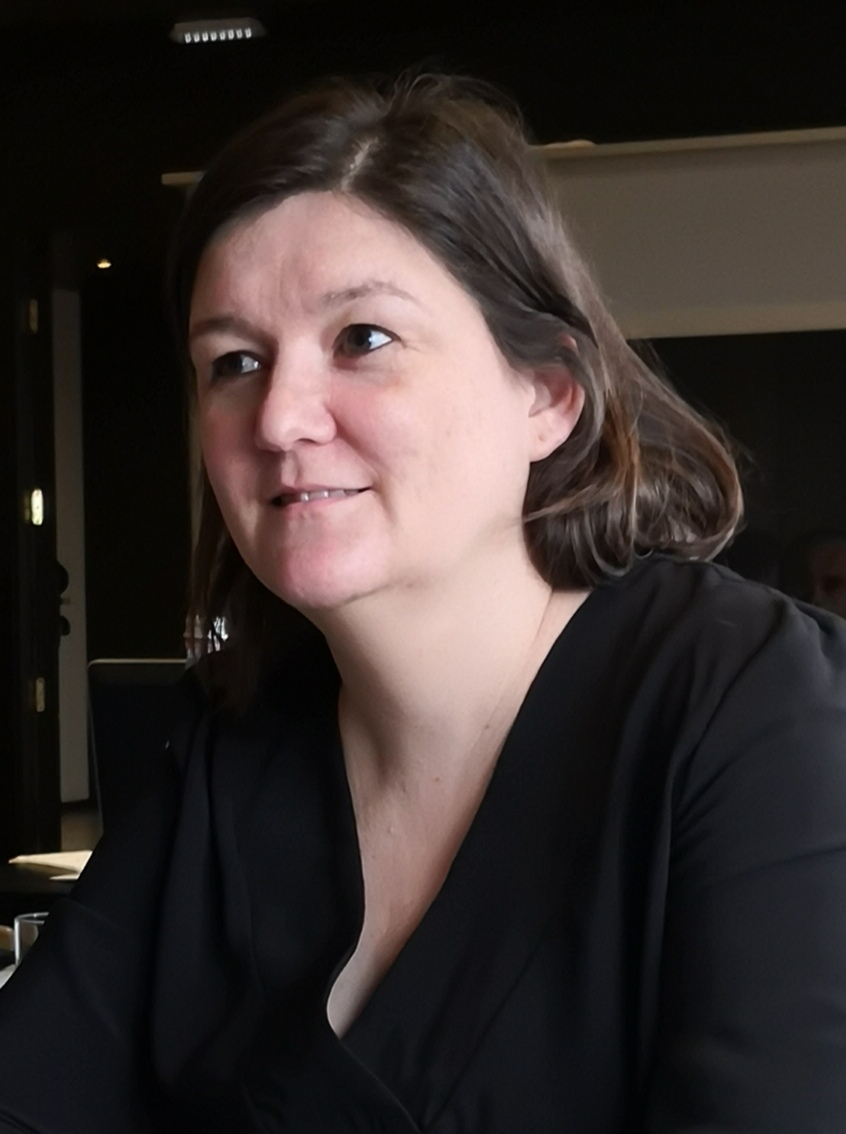
- Franssen in 2020

Member of the European Parliament for the Dutch-speaking electoral college of Belgium
- Incumbent
- Assumed office 2 July 2019

Personal details
- Born: 30 January 1976 (age 50) Oudenaarde
- Party: Christen-Democratisch en Vlaams
- Education: Ghent University
- Occupation: Politician

Cindy Franssen (born 30 January 1976) is a Belgian politician of the Christian Democratic and Flemish (CD&V) who was elected as a Member of the European Parliament in 2019.

Franssen has since been serving on the Committee on Employment and Social Affairs and the Committee on Women's Rights and Gender Equality. She later also joined the Special Committee on Beating Cancer (2020) and the Special Committee on the COVID-19 pandemic (2022). Cindy Franssen was also recognized as one of the 100 Influential Women in Oncology by OncoDaily.

In addition to her committee assignments, Franssen is part of the Parliament's delegation for relations with India. She is also part of the European Parliament Intergroup on Fighting against Poverty, the European Parliament Intergroup on Trade Unions, the European Parliament Intergroup on Disability and the MEPs Against Cancer group.
