= Dominique Tilmans =

Belgian politician (born 1951)

Senator
- In office 28 June 2007 – June 2011

Personal details
- Born: 4 August 1951 (age 74) Brussels
- Party: Mouvement Réformateur
- Website: www.dominiquetilmans.be

Dominique Tilmans (born 1951) is a Belgian politician and a member of the Mouvement Réformateur. She was elected as a member of the Belgian Senate in 2007.
