= Dirk Sterckx =

Belgian politician

Dirk Jozef Maria Sterckx (Dutch pronunciation: [ˈdɪr(ə)k ˈstɛr(ə)ks]; born 25 September 1946 in Herent) is a Belgian politician of Anders (formerly Open Flemish Liberals and Democrats) who served as a Member of the European Parliament from 1999 until 2011, representing Flanders.

In parliament, Stercks was a member of the Bureau of the Alliance of Liberals and Democrats for Europe and served on the Committee on Fisheries and the Committee on Transport and Tourism. He was also a substitute for the Committee on Industry, Research and Energy.

== Education ==
- 1969: Master's degree in Germanic languages and literature

== Career ==
- 1969: Teacher
- 1975: Journalist, BRT television
- 1986: Copy editor of the BRT television news
- 1994: Copy editor and anchorman on Terzake, television news interpretation programme
- 1996: Head of news and anchorman on VRT television news
- 1999: Member of the European Parliament
- 2001: Member of Lint Municipal Council (January
- 2004: VLD Chairman (February - June)
- Member of the Conference of Delegation Chairmen

== See also ==
- 2004 European Parliament election in Belgium
