= Lieve Maes =

Belgian politician

Senator
- Incumbent
- Assumed office 6 July 2010

Personal details
- Born: 12 May 1960 (age 66) Brussels, Belgium
- Party: N-VA
- Website: http://www.n-va.be/cv/lieve-maes

Lieve Maes (born 12 May 1960, in Brussels) is a Belgian politician and is affiliated with the N-VA. She was elected as a member of the Belgian Senate in 2010.

In March 2015 Lieve Maes made headlines in her unrelentless fight against the oppression of the Flemish people, by lamenting the lack of announcements in Dutch when flights serviced by British Airways land at the international airport of Brussels.
