= Peter Van Rompuy =

Belgian politician (born 1980)

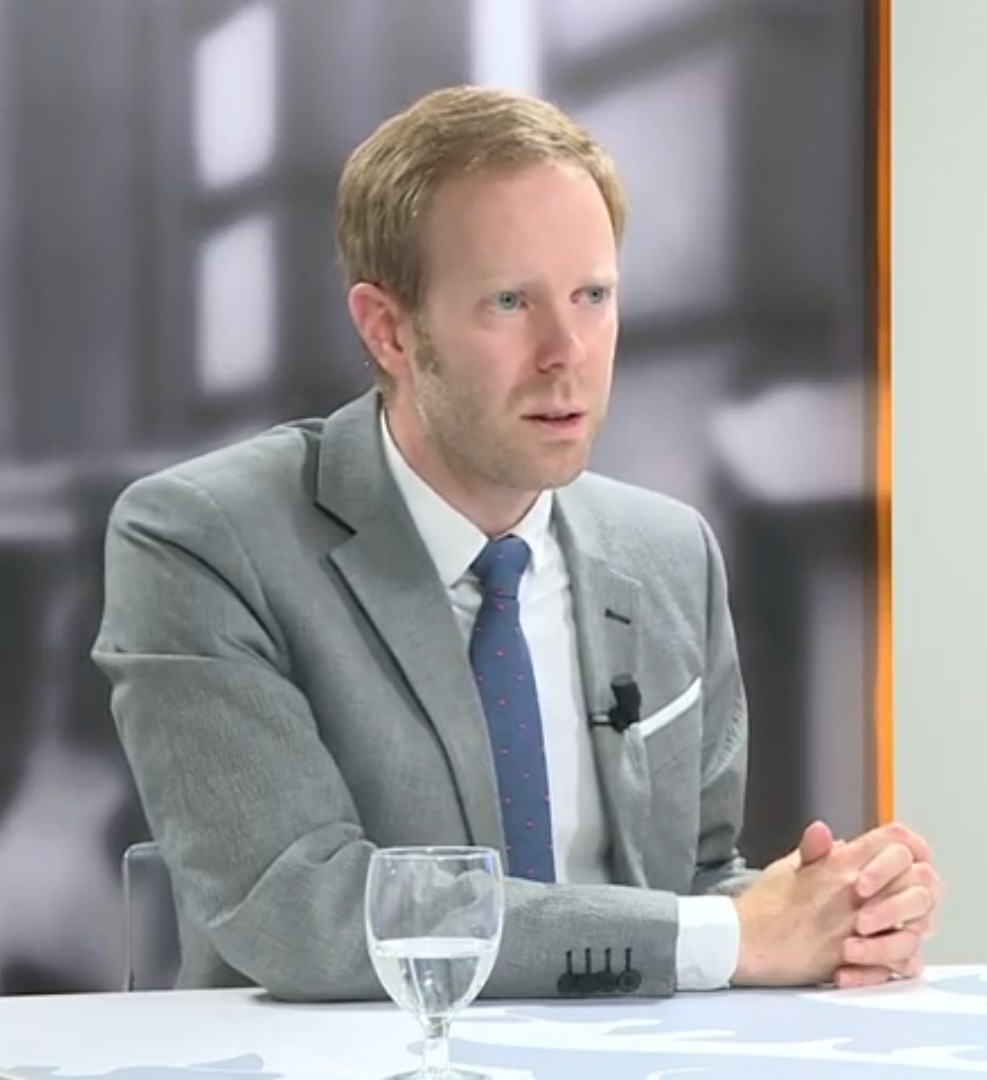
Van Rompuy in 2019

Peter Van Rompuy (born 5 March 1980) is a Belgian politician. He is the leader of the CD&V in the Flemish Parliament. On February 6, 2019, he became group leader of the CD&V in the Flemish Parliament, following the appointment of Koen Van den Heuvel to the Flemish government.

His father is former Prime Minister Herman Van Rompuy.
