= Christiane Vienne =

Belgian politician

Senator
- In office 12 July 2007 – June 2011

Personal details
- Born: 18 January 1951 (age 75) Moeskroen
- Party: Parti Socialiste
- Website: www.christianevienne.be

Christiane Vienne (born 1951) is a Belgian politician and a member of the Parti Socialiste. She was elected as a member of the Belgian Senate in 2007.
