= Marleen Temmerman =

Belgian gynaecologist and politician

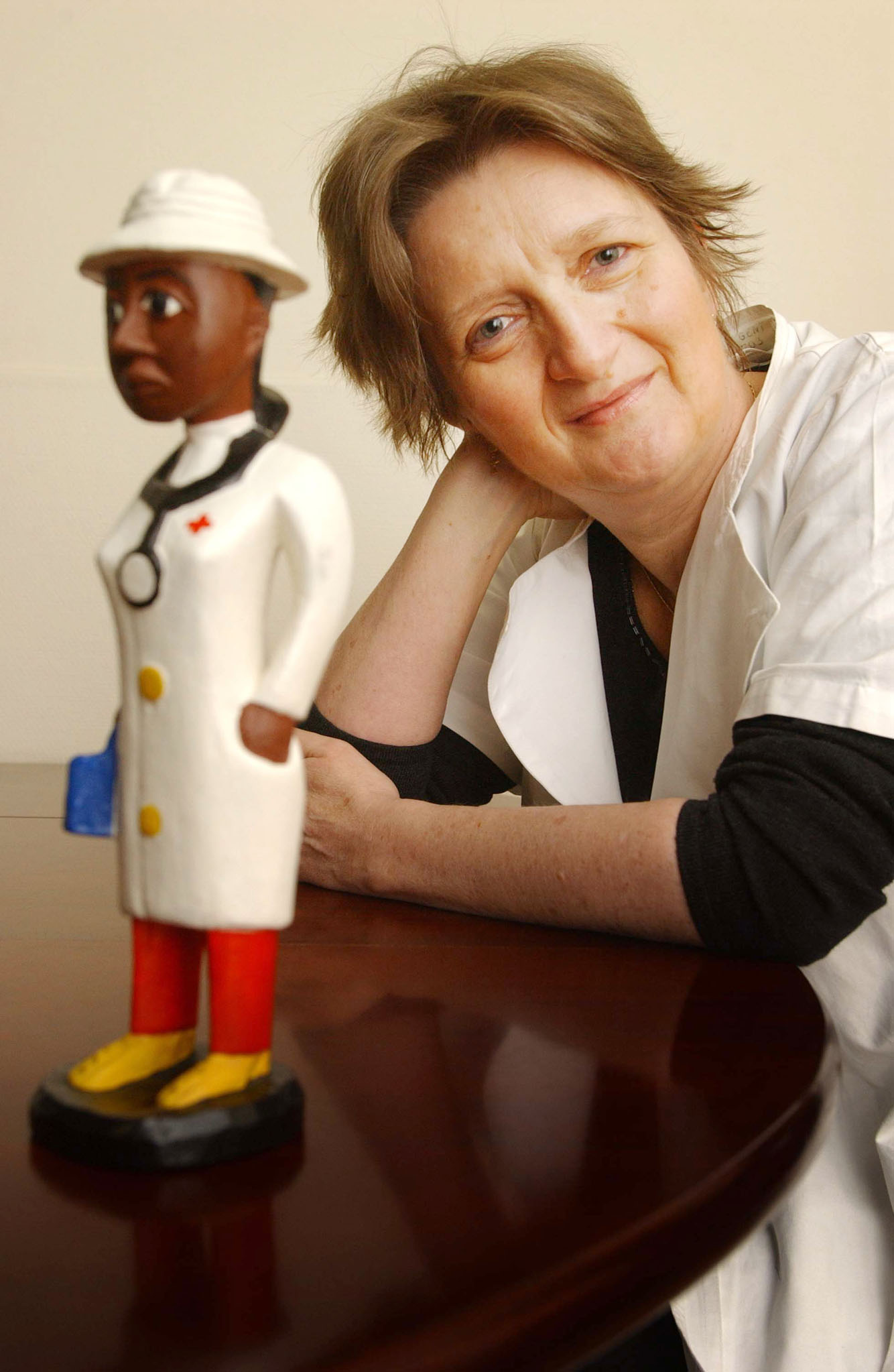

Personal details
- Born: 24 March 1953 (age 73) Lokeren, Belgium
- Website: www.fondsmarleentemmerman.be

Marleen Temmerman (born 24 March 1953 in Lokeren, Belgium) is a Belgian gynaecologist, professor and former senator, currently heading the Centre of Excellence in Women and Child Health at Aga Khan University in Nairobi, Kenya.

== Biography ==
Temmerman has worked in various locations around the world for the health and rights of women and children. Most of her work is in the academic and political international arena, particularly in collaboration with United Nations organizations, such as WHO and UNFPA, as well as the European Union, the African Union, national governments in Europe and Africa, as well as with media and civil society.

Temmerman's diverse skills in academics, science, management and politics, in conjunction with her work in the area of women, children and adolescents' health and rights, led The Lancet to call her "a polymath in reproductive health". Her advocacy efforts for women's health and rights inspired the Irish rock band U2, during their concert on 1 August 2017 in the King Baudouin Stadium in Brussels, to include her in the list of inspiring women ("Women of the World Unite") who were put in the spotlight during the song "Ultra Violet (Light My Way)".

== Professional career ==
Temmerman studied medicine at Ghent University in Belgium. This choice was primarily made out of social engagement. Her first contact with Africa during an internship in Butare, Rwanda, in 1975 raised her interest in the health and rights of women living in low- and middle-income countries.

=== Early career ===
Trained in obstetrics and gynaecology, tropical medicine and public health, Temmerman was a junior researcher in the 1980s and later a research leader and mentor. She started with research in infertility at the General Hospital of the Free University of Brussels, and followed with clinical epidemiological research on sexually transmitted diseases and HIV at the Department of Microbiology at the Institute of Tropical Medicine in Antwerp, under the leadership of Peter Piot. This position included a lecturing and research assignment at the University of Nairobi, where she was a member of the WHO Collaborative Centre on HIV/STI, Department of Medical Microbiology. She lived in Kenya from 1986 to 1992.

=== Ghent University and the International Centre of Reproductive Health ===
Back in Belgium in 1992, Temmerman founded the International Centre for Reproductive Health (ICRH) at Ghent University, which has sister research organizations in Kenya (ICRHK) and Mozambique (ICRHM) and a large global collaborative academic network. ICRH obtained research funding from the European Commission, the Belgian development cooperation (DGD, BTC]), the Flemish development cooperation (VLIR, FICA), the Special Research Fund (BOF) of Ghent University and other organizations. Many of these research activities took place in sub-Saharan Africa and involved implementation research on a broad range of sexual and reproductive health issues, including HIV/AIDS. In addition, research collaborations were set up with other European countries, China, India, Central and Latin America, Australia and the Russian Federation. ICRH is a WHO Collaborating Centre on Reproductive Health since 2004, and a UNFPA preferential partner.

Temmerman has served as a professor of OB/GYN at Ghent University in Belgium since 1995, currently with leave of absence. During her over 30 years of clinical work as an obstetrician she supervised over 18,000 births in many parts of the world. She established a worldwide network of universities in the field of reproductive, maternal, newborn and adolescent health, with over 500 publications and around 50 PhD supervisions in Europe, Africa, Latin America and China.

=== World Health Organization ===
In 2012, Temmerman was appointed Director of the Department of Reproductive Health and Research of the World Health Organization. RHR is the main instrument within the United Nations system for research in human reproduction and sexual and reproductive health, bringing together policy-makers and programmers, scientists, health care providers, clinicians, consumers and community representatives to identify and address priorities for research to improve sexual and reproductive health. She provided strategic leadership for WHO within the context of ICPD beyond 2014, Beijing+20 and the post 2015 MDGs and Sustainable Development Goals discussions and led on behalf of WHO the development of the technical content for the Global Strategy on Every Women, Every Child, Every Adolescent 2016–2030.

=== Aga Khan University ===
In December 2015, she retired from the World Health Organization and is since working at Aga Khan University (AKU), based in Nairobi, Kenya as head of the Department of Obstetrics & Gynaecology and director of the Centre of Excellence in Women and Child Health.

While in this position, in 2019, Temmerman was also appointed UNESCO Chair on Youth Leadership.

== Politics ==
Temmerman began her political career with Agalev, the Flemish Green Party. In 2001, she became member of the town council of Lokeren on behalf of Agalev. In 2004, she joined the Socialist Party (sp.a). She was elected as a senator to the Belgian Parliament in 2007 where she served until 2012 as a member of the Commission on Social Affairs, the Committee on European Affairs, the Advisory Committee on Equal Opportunities between Women and Men, and the Committee on the Monitoring of Foreign Missions. In that capacity, she was member of the European Parliamentary Forum and Chair of the HIV/AIDS Advisory Group of the Inter-Parliamentary Union. In 2011, she succeeded Johan Vande Lanotte as fraction leader in the Senate. As an expert on women's health and as a politician, she served as a member of the UN iERG (independent expert review group) till 2012. In autumn 2012 she left politics to become director of the Department of Reproductive Health and Research at the World Health Organization. Her successor in the Belgian Senate was Leona Detiège.

On 8 February 2011, after 244 days without Belgian government and inspired by the Aristophanes comedy Lysistrata, she suggested to the spouses of Belgian politicians to ban sex until the country forms a government.

== Books and publications ==
Temmerman has authored over 600 books and articles in the area of women's health, with a Hirsch index of 98. She published a series of books for the broader public (in Dutch: Onrust in de Onderbuik, Bekentenissen uit de Onderbuik, Milady, Mama Daktari) with stories about women and girls' lives. She has also contributed to a series of online educational videos on pregnancy and childbirth.

== Awards and honours ==
Temmerman has received several awards and honours for her research and advocacy work, including:

- Commander in the Order of Leopold (2008);
- Recipient of the three-yearly prize of meritorious gynaecologist from FIGO, the International Federation of Gynaecologists and Midwives, in Cape Town (July 2009);
- Lifetime Achievement Award, given in London, from the British Medical Journal (10 March 2010);
- Prize of Liberal Humanism from the (Belgian) Humanist-Liberal Society for her commitment to women's rights, health and emancipation (21 June 2013);
- Marie Popelin Award for Women's Rights, established by the National Women's Council Belgium and given every five years (January 2016);
- Outstanding Female Scientist recognition from European & Developing Countries Clinical Trials Partnership (November 2016).
- Moran of the Order of the Burning Spear (2020)

Ghent University established the Marleen Temmerman Fund which relies entirely on voluntary donations. With this Fund the Ghent University honours her faculty staff member and helps to improve the situation of numerous women and children.

== Personal life ==
Temmerman is married and has a son.
