= Yves Buysse =

Belgian politician

Senator
- In office 28 June 2007 – June 2011

Personal details
- Born: 3 September 1968 (age 57) Bruges
- Party: Vlaams Belang
- Website: www.yvesbuysse.be

Yves Buysse (born 1968) is a Belgian politician and a member of the Vlaams Belang. He was elected as a member of the Belgian Senate from 2007 to 2014 and has been a member of the Flemish Parliament since 2019.

Buysse was an insurance consultant before entering politics and worked as an assistant to former Vlaams Blok and Vlaams Belang leader Frank Vanhecke.
