= Nele Lijnen =

Belgian politician (born 1978)

Senator
- In office 28 June 2007 – June 2011

Personal details
- Born: 12 April 1978 (age 48) Houthalen-Helchteren
- Party: Open Vld
- Website: www.nelelijnen.be

Nele Lijnen (born 1978) is a Belgian politician and a member of the Open Vld. She was elected as a member of the Belgian Senate in 2007.
