= Piet De Bruyn =

Belgian politician

Member of the Flemish Parliament
- Incumbent
- Assumed office 6 February 2013

Senator
- In office 12 October 2010 – 6 February 2013
- Preceded by: Kim Geybels
- Succeeded by: Bart De Nijn

Personal details
- Born: 2 April 1968 (age 58) Hasselt, Limburg
- Party: N-VA
- Website: pietdebruyn.n-va.be

Piet De Bruyn (born 2 April 1968 in Hasselt, Limburg) is a Belgian politician and is affiliated to the New Flemish Alliance (N-VA). He is member of the Flemish Parliament since February 2013, having previously been MFP between December 2007 and June 2009. He has also been senator between October 2010 and February 2013.

He is also a council member in the municipality of Rotselaar following the 2012 local elections.

He is active regarding human rights and LGBT rights in Belgium.
