= Guy Swennen =

Belgian politician

Senator
- In office 12 July 2007 – June 2011

Personal details
- Born: 30 July 1956 (age 69) Eigenbilzen
- Party: Socialistische Partij Anders

Guido Willy (Guy) Swennen (born 1956) is a Belgian politician and a member of the Socialistische Partij Anders. He was co-opted as a member of the Belgian Senate in 2007.
