= Louis Ide =

Belgian politician (born 1973)

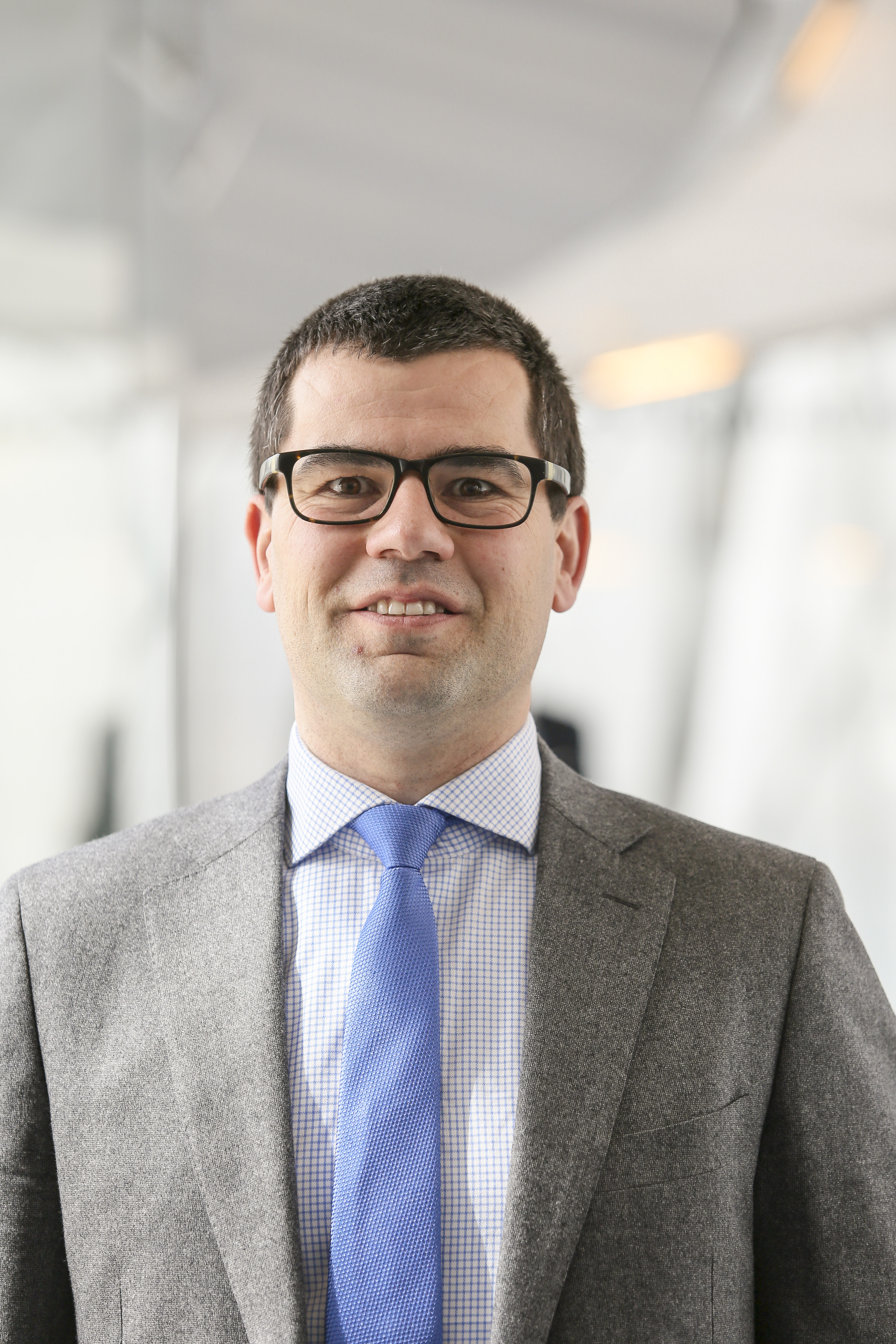

Senator
- In office 28 June 2007 – 28 April 2014

Member of the European Parliament
- In office 1 July 2014 – December 2014

Personal details
- Born: 3 July 1973 (age 52) Roeselare, West Flanders
- Party: N-VA
- Website: www.n-va.be/louiside

Louis Ide (born 3 July 1973, in Roeselare) is a Belgian physician and politician affiliated to the N-VA.

== Career ==
Ide was Vice President of N-VA from 2004 until 2007. In 2007, he was elected as a member of the Belgian Senate. He was Vice President of the Senate from 2013 until 2014.

Ide was elected member of the European Parliament in the 2014 elections. Upon being elected General Secretary of N-VA on 13 December 2014 he resigned his seat.
