= Francis Delpérée =

Belgian politician

Baron Francis Delpérée

Senator
- In office 2007 – 2014

Personal details
- Born: 14 January 1942 (age 84) Liège
- Party: cdH
- Website: www.delperee.be

Francis, Baron Delpérée (French: [dɛlpeʁe]) is a Belgian legal scholar, politician and a member of the cdH born on 14 January 1942 in Liege. He was elected as a member of the Belgian Senate in 2007. During his studies at the Université catholique de Louvain he was a member of the Olivaint Conference of Belgium.

He was inducted into the Norwegian Academy of Science and Letters in 1998.
