= Helga Stevens =

Belgian politician

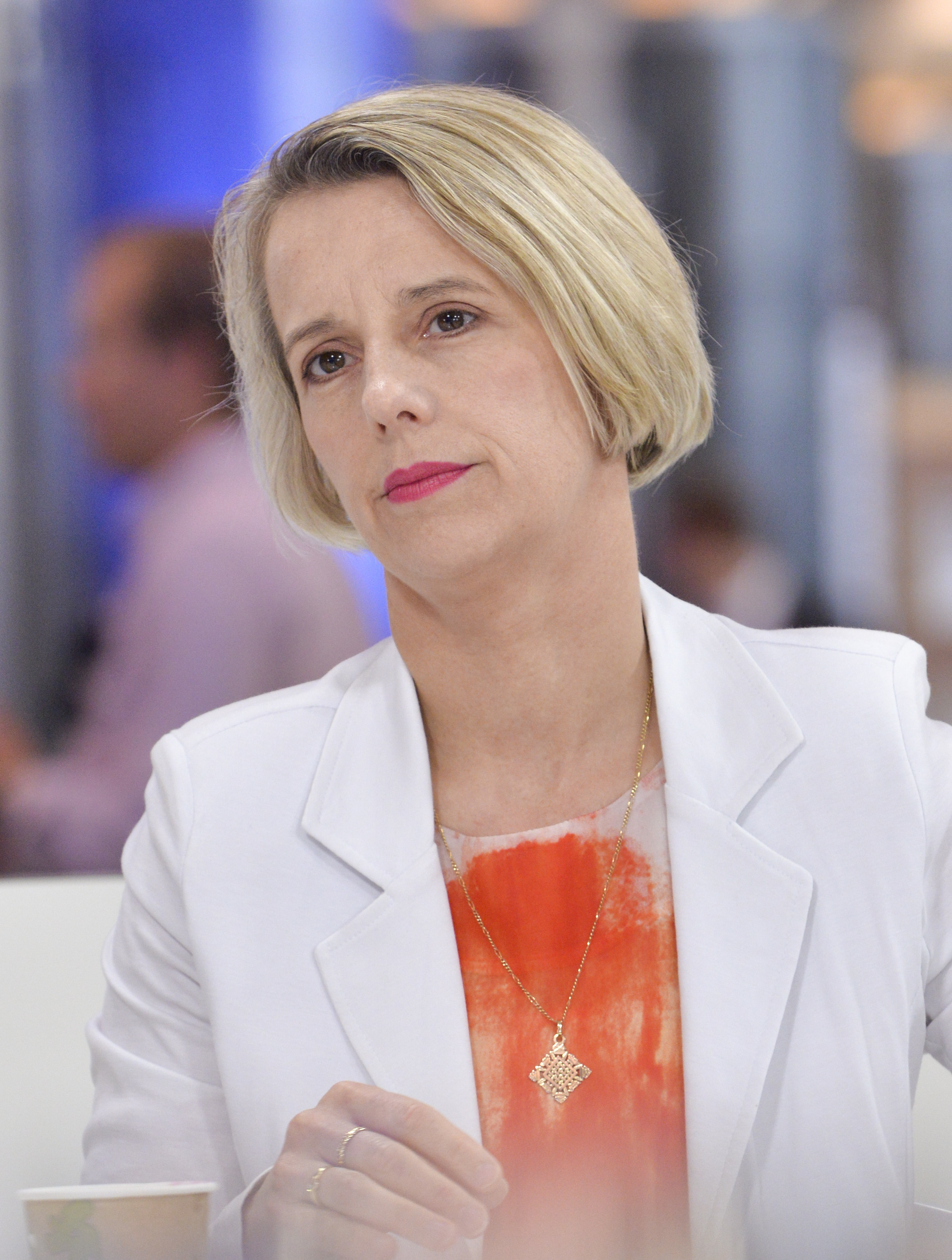

Vice-Chair of the European Conservatives and Reformists Flemish Delegation
- In office 1 July 2014 – 1 July 2019
- Chairman: Syed Kamall
- Serving alongside: Ryszard Legutko; Raffaele Fitto; Roberts Zīle; Hans-Olaf Henkel; Geoffrey Van Orden

Member of the European Parliament
- In office 1 July 2014 – 1 July 2019

(Community) Senator
- In office 5 July 2007 – 6 June 2009
- In office 7 June 2009 – 6 May 2010
- In office 13 July 2010 – 24 May 2014

Member of the Flemish Parliament
- In office 13 June 2004 – 6 June 2009
- In office 7 June 2009 – 24 May 2014

Personal details
- Born: 9 August 1968 (age 57) Sint-Truiden, Belgium
- Party: Nieuw-Vlaamse Alliantie
- Website: www.helgastevens.be

Helga Stevens (born 9 August 1968) is a Belgian politician of the New Flemish Alliance (N-VA) and member of the European Parliament since 2014. She is well known for her work fighting for the rights of people with disabilities.

== Early life ==
Born deaf, Helga Stevens first attended Koninklijk Instituut voor Doven en Spraakgestoorden, a special school for deaf students in Hasselt, before later switching to a mainstream school in Sint-Truiden. While spending a year in St. Louis, Missouri on a Rotary Scholarship 1987, she visited Gallaudet University and met a deaf attorney who inspired her to continue her studies in law. Back in Belgium, she studied law at the Katholieke Universiteit Leuven and became the first deaf lawyer in Belgium. In 1993, Stevens returned to the United States and obtained a master's degree at UC Berkeley School of Law on a Fulbright scholarship.

In 1996, Stevens started working for the European Union of the Deaf (EUD) and was active in the Federation of Flemish Deaf Organisations.

== Political career ==
Stevens became politically active and was for the first time a candidate in 1999 for the Belgian Senate on the People's Union list (10th place). She was again candidate for Senate in 2003 on the New Flemish Alliance list (3rd place).

She was elected as a Member of the Flemish Parliament in 2004 and as a member of the Senate in 2007. She was reelected for the Flemish Parliament in 2009 and as a member of the Senate in 2010.

In May 2014, Stevens was elected Member of the European Parliament. In November 2014, she was elected vice-president of the European Conservatives and Reformists group. In addition to her committee assignments, Stevens serves as president of the European Parliament's Disabilities Intergroup.

In October 2016, the ECR group announced Stevens as their group's choice to be the next President of the European Parliament.
