= Martine Taelman =

Belgian politician

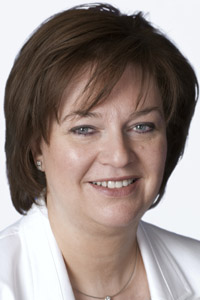

Senator
- Incumbent
- Assumed office 12 July 2007
- In office 14 July 1999 – 19 May 2003

Representative
- In office 19 May 2003 – 12 July 2007

Personal details
- Born: 19 July 1965 (age 60) Lier, Belgium
- Party: Open VLD
- Website: www.martinetaelman.be

Martine Taelman (born 1965) is a Belgian politician and a member of the Open VLD. She was elected as a member of the Belgian Senate in 2007.
