= Elke Sleurs =

Belgian politician (born 1968)

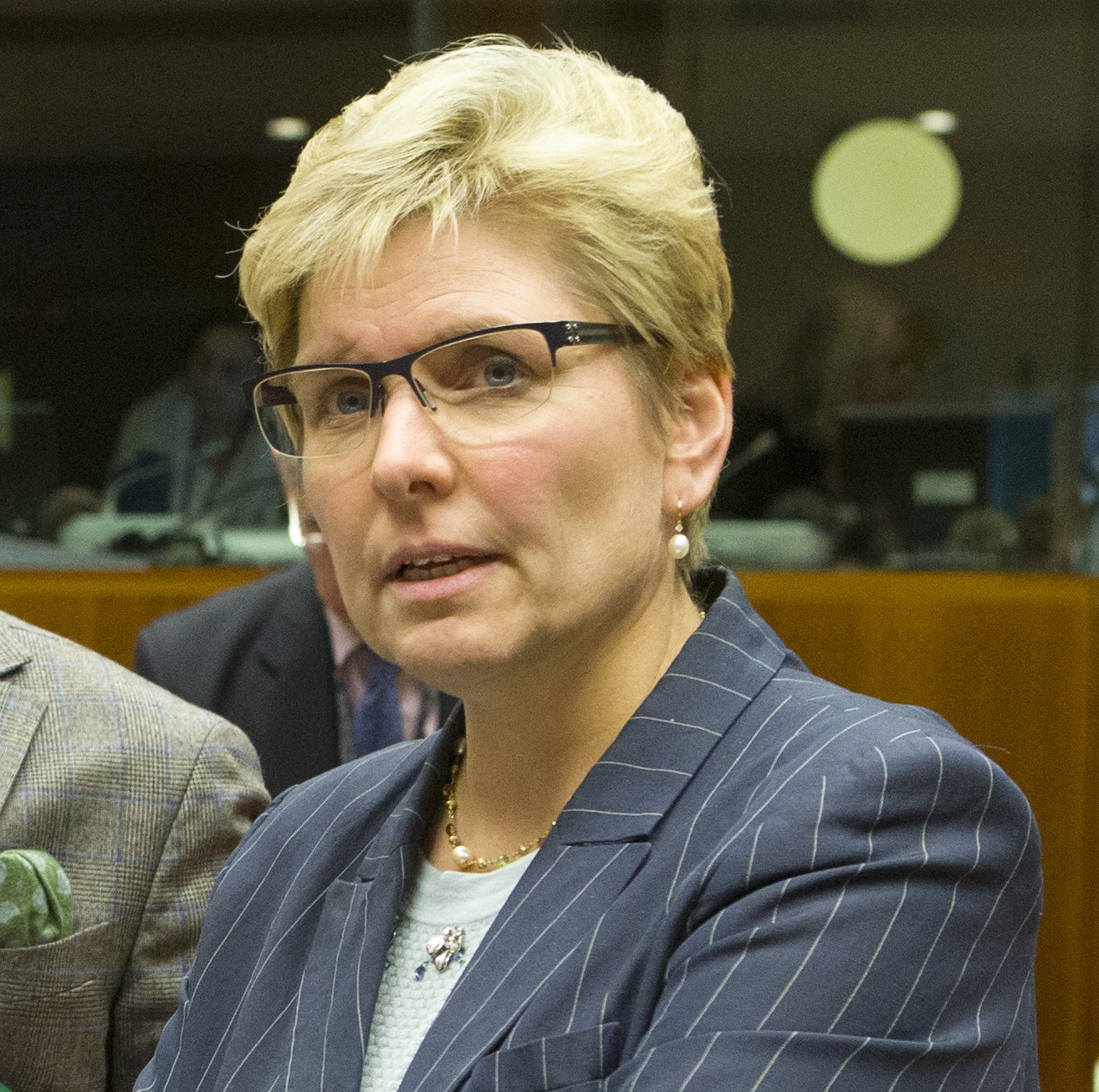
- Elke Sleurs in 2016.

Secretary of State for Poverty Reduction, Equal Opportunities, People with Disabilities, Urban Policy and Scientific Policy
- In office 11 October 2014 – 24 February 2017
- Prime Minister: Charles Michel
- Succeeded by: Zuhal Demir

Senator
- In office 13 June 2010 – 24 May 2014

Personal details
- Born: 6 February 1968 (age 58) Ghent, East Flanders
- Party: N-VA
- Website: http://www.n-va.be/cv/elke-sleurs

Elke Sleurs (born 6 February 1968 in Ghent) is a Belgian politician and is affiliated with the N-VA.

Sleurs is a gynaecologist. She was elected as a member of the Belgian Senate in 2010. After the 2014 elections Sleurs was elected as a member of the Flemish Parliament and a regional senator. However, in October 2014, she became Secretary of State for Poverty Reduction, Equal Opportunities, People With Disabilities, Combating Fraud and Scientific Policy in the Michel Government. On 21 May 2015, she became secretary of state for Urban Policy, but handed over the Combating Fraud portfolio to colleague Johan Van Overtveldt.

On 20 February 2017 Sleurs announced she would leave her position as Secretary of State for Equal Rights, Disabled Persons, Scientific Policy, Urban Policy and fighting Poverty to become lijsttrekker in Ghent for the upcoming 2018 municipal elections. Three days later, the N-VA decided to replace Sleurs with Zuhal Demir. Demir was sworn in by the King on 24 February 2017.
