= List of members of the Senate of Belgium, 2003–2007 =

This is the list of Belgian Senators from 2003 till 2007.

== Election results (18 May 2003) ==
Party	Votes	%	+/–	Seats	+/–
Socialistische Partij Anders–Spirit	1,013,560	15.47	+6.59	7	+3
Vlaamse Liberalen en Democraten	1,007,868	15.38	+0.01	7	+1
Parti Socialiste	840,908	12.84	+3.19	6	+2
Christen-Democratisch en Vlaams	832,849	12.71	–2.03	6	0
Mouvement Réformateur	795,757	12.15	+1.58	5	0
Vlaams Blok	741,940	11.32	+1.91	5	+1
Centre démocrate humaniste	362,705	5.54	–0.49	2	–1
Ecolo	208,868	3.19	–4.21	1	–2
New Flemish Alliance	200,273	3.06	New	0	New
Agalev	161,024	2.46	–4.62	0	–3
National Front	147,305	2.25	+0.75	1	+1
Vivant	86,723	1.32	–0.66	0	0
Chrétiens démocrates francophones	38,339	0.59	New	0	New
Rassemblement Wallonie France	27,424	0.42	New	0	New
Liberal Appeal	26,629	0.41	New	0	New
Workers' Party of Belgium	18,699	0.29	+0.11	0	0
RESIST	17,604	0.27	New	0	New
Left Socialist Party	8,337	0.13	New	0	New
VeiligBlauw	8,048	0.12	New	0	New
Social Liberal Democrats	6,651	0.10	–0.02	0	0
Total	6,551,511	100.00	–	40	0
Valid votes	6,551,511	94.48			
Invalid/blank votes	383,093	5.52			
Total votes	6,934,604	100.00			
Registered voters/turnout	7,570,637	91.60			
Source: IBZ

== By type ==
=== Senators by Right ===
Senator	Party	Office entered
Prince Philippe	No affiliation	June 21, 1994
Princess Astrid	No affiliation	November 20, 1996
Prince Laurent	No affiliation	May 31, 2000

=== Directly elected senators ===
==== Dutch-speaking electorate (25) ====
Senator	Party
Mimount Bousakla	LDD
Yves Buysse	VB
Jurgen Ceder	VB
Pierre Chevalier	VLD
Hugo Coveliers	VB
Sabine de Bethune	CD&V
Stefaan De Clerck	CD&V
Jean-Marie Dedecker	VLD
Christel Geerts	SP.A/Spirit
Jeannine Leduc	VLD
Staf Nimmegeers	SP.A/Spirit
Stefaan Noreilde	VLD
Fatma Pehlivan	SP.A/Spirit
Etienne Schouppe	CD&V
Erika Thijs	CD&V
Annemie Van de Casteele	VLD
Anke Van dermeersch	VB
Marc Van Peel	CD&V
Hugo Vandenberghe	CD&V
Lionel Vandenberghe	SP.A/Spirit
Ludwig Vandenhove	SP.A/Spirit
Frank Vanhecke	VB
Patrik Vankrunkelsven	VLD
Myriam Vanlerberghe	SP.A/Spirit
Wim Verreycken	VB

==== French-speaking electorate (15) ====
Senator	Party
Jean Cornil	PS
Armand De Decker	MR
Nathalie de T' Serclaes	MR
Alain Destexhe	MR
Francis Detraux	FN
Antoine Duquesne	MR
Isabelle Durant	Ecolo
Jean-Marie Happart	PS
Marie-José Laloy	PS
Anne-Marie Lizin	Independent
Philippe Mahoux	PS
Philippe Moureaux	PS
Clotilde Nyssens	cdH
Luc Paque	Independent
Marc Wilmots	MR

=== Community senators ===
==== Flemish Community (10) ====
Senator	Party
Jean-Marie Dedecker → Devolder (Open VLD)	LDD
Margriet Hermans → Ramoudt	Open VLD
Dany Vandenbossche → Koninckx → Hostekint	SP.A
Bart Martens → Timmermans	SP.A
Etienne Schouppe → Caluwé	CD&V
Luc Van den Brande	CD&V
Joris Van Hauthem	VB
André Van Nieuwkerke → Van Duppen	SP.A
Karim Van Overmeire	VB
Paul Wille	Open VLD

==== French-speaking Community (10) ====
Senator	Party
Sfia Bouarfa	PS
Christian Brotcorne	cdH
Josy Dubié ← Cheron ← Michel	Ecolo
Christine Defraigne	MR
Francis Delpérée ← Thissen	cdH
Amina Derbaki Sbaï	Independent
Alain Destexhe ← Zenner	MR
N/A ← Istasse	PS
Joëlle Kapompolé ← Poty	PS
François Roelants du Vivier	MR

==== German-speaking Community (1) ====
Senator	Party
Berni Collas ← Siquet (PS)	MR/PFF

=== Coopted senators ===
==== Dutch language group (6) ====
Senator	Party
Frank Creyelman	VB
Jacinta De Roeck	SP.A–Spirit
Mia De Schamphelaere	CD&V
Nele Lijnen ← Germeaux	Open VLD
Fauzaya Talhaoui ← Gennez	SP.A–Spirit
Luc Willems	Open VLD

==== French language group (4) ====
Senator	Party
Jacques Brotchi ← Crombé-Berton	MR
Michel Delacroix	FN
Pierre Galand	PS
Olga Zrihen ← Vienne	PS

== By party ==
=== Dutch-speaking ===
==== Christian Democratic and Flemish (9) ====
Senator	Type
Wouter Beke	Directly elected
Sabine de Bethune	Directly elected
Jan Steverlynck	Directly elected
Elke Tindemans	Directly elected
Marc Van Peel	Directly elected
Hugo Vandenberghe	Directly elected
Etienne Schouppe	Community
Luc Van den Brande	Community
Mia De Schamphelaere	Coopted

==== Flemish Interest (6 [+1]) ====
Senator	Type
Hugo Coveliers (ex VLD/Vivant)	Directly elected
Anke Vandermeersch	Directly elected
Frank Creyelman	Directly elected
Wim Verreycken	Directly elected
Joris Van Hauthem	Community
Karim Van Overmeire	Community
Yves Buysse	Coopted
Jurgen Ceder	Directly elected
Nele Jansegers	Directly elected

==== Open Flemish Liberals and Democrats / Vivant (10 [-2]) ====
Senator	Type
Stéphanie Anseeuw	Directly elected
Pierre Chevalier	Directly elected
Jeannine Leduc	Directly elected
Stefaan Noreilde	Directly elected
Annemie Van de Casteele	Directly elected
Patrik Vankrunkelsven	Directly elected
Margriet Hermans	Community
Paul Wille	Community
Nele Lijnen	Coopted
Luc Willems	Coopted
Hugo Coveliers → Flemish Interest	Directly elected
Jean-Marie Dedecker ← Devolder → List Dedecker	Community

==== List Dedecker (2 [+2]) ====
Senator	Type
Mimount Bousakla (ex SP.A)	Directly elected
Jean-Marie Dedecker (ex VLD)	Community

=== French-speaking ===
==== Socialist Party (12) ====
Senator	Type
Jean Cornil	Directly elected
Jean-Marie Happart ← Di Rupo	Directly elected
Anne-Marie Lizin	Directly elected
Philippe Mahoux	Directly elected
Philippe Moureaux	Directly elected
Franco Seminara ← Laloy	Directly elected
Sfia Bouarfa	Community
Amina Derbaki Sbaï (ex MR)	Community
N/A ← Istasse	Community
Joëlle Kapompolé ← Poty	Community
Pierre Galand	Coopted
Olga Zrihen ← Vienne	Coopted

==== Humanist Democratic Centre (3 [-1]) ====
Senator	Type
Clotilde Nyssens	Directly elected
Christian Brotcorne	Community
Francis Delpérée	Community
Luc Paque → Reformist Movement	Directly elected

==== Ecolo (2) ====
Senator	Type
Isabelle Durant	Directly elected
Josy Dubié	Community

==== National Front (1 [-1]) ====
Senator	Type
Michel Delacroix	Coopted
Francis Detraux	Directly elected
