= List of members of the Senate of Belgium, 1999–2003 =

This is the list of Belgian Senators from 1999 till 2003.

== Election results (13 May 1999) ==
Party	Votes	%	Seats			
Party	Votes	%	Won	Community	Co-opted	Total
Flemish Liberals and Democrats	952,116	15.37	6	3	2	11
Christian People's Party	913,508	14.75	6	3	1	10
Liberal Reformist Party–Democratic Front of Francophones	654,961	10.57	5	3	1	9
Parti Socialiste	597,890	9.65	4	4	2	10
Vlaams Blok	583,208	9.42	4	1	1	6
Socialistische Partij	550,657	8.89	4	1	1	6
Ecolo	458,658	7.40	3	3	0	6
Agalev	438,931	7.09	3	1	1	5
Christian Social Party	374,002	6.04	3	1	1	5
People's Union	317,830	5.13	2	1	0	3
Vivant	123,498	1.99	0	0	0	0
National Front	92,924	1.50	0	0	0	0
Workers' Party of Belgium	35,493	0.57	0	0	0	0
Party for a New Politics in Belgium	26,124	0.42	0	0	0	0
New Belgian Front	23,382	0.38	0	0	0	0
Communist Party	21,991	0.36	0	0	0	0
Social-Liberal Democrats	7,446	0.12	0	0	0	0
Democratic Union	7,368	0.12	0	0	0	0
PJU–PDB	6,372	0.10	0	0	0	0
VLAAMS	4,902	0.08	0	0	0	0
Parti Communautaire National-Européen	3,110	0.05	0	0	0	0
Total	6,194,371	100.00	40	21	10	71
Valid votes	6,194,371	93.14				
Invalid/blank votes	456,425	6.86				
Total votes	6,650,796	100.00				
Registered voters/turnout	7,343,466	90.57				
Source: Belgian Elections

== Seat division ==
Party	Language group	Seats by type			Total
Party	Language group	Directly elected	Community	Coopted	Total
Flemish Liberals and Democrats	Dutch	6	3	2	11
Christian People's Party	Dutch	6	3	1	10
Liberal Reformist Party/Democratic Front of the Francophones	French	5	3	1	9
Socialist Party (Wallonia)	French	4	3+1	2	9
Ecolo	French	3	3	–	6
Flemish Block	Dutch	4	1	1	6
Socialist Party (Flanders)	Dutch	4	1	1	6
Agalev	Dutch	3	1	1	5
Christian Social Party	French	3	1	1	5
People's Union	Dutch	2	1	–	3
		40	21	10	71

== By type ==
=== Senators by Right ===
Senator	Party	Office entered
Prince Philippe	No affiliation	June 21, 1994
Princess Astrid	No affiliation	November 20, 1996

=== Directly elected senators ===
==== Dutch-speaking electorate (25) ====
Senator	Party
Yves Buysse ← Raes	VB
Jurgen Ceder	VB
Marcel Colla	SP
Jacques D'Hooghe ← Moreels	CVP
Sabine de Bethune	CVP
Paul De Grauwe	VLD
Jacinta De Roeck	Agalev
Jean-Marie Dedecker	VLD
André Geens ← Verwilghen	VLD
Meryem Kaçar ← Vogels	Agalev
Theo Kelchtermans	CVP
Jeannine Leduc	VLD
Frans Lozie	Agalev
Guy Moens	SP
Jan Steverlynck ← Dehaene	CVP
Martine Taelman	VLD
Erika Thijs	CVP
Louis Tobback	SP
Hugo Vandenberghe	CVP
Patrik Vankrunkelsven	VU
Myriam Vanlerberghe	SP
Vincent Van Quickenborne	VU
Iris Van Riet ← Verhofstadt	VLD
Gerda Van Steenberge	VB
Wim Verreycken	VB

==== French-speaking electorate (15) ====
Senator	Party
Michel Barbeaux ← Maystadt	PSC
Philippe Bodson	PRL-FDF
Christine Cornet d'Elzius ← Michel	PRL-FDF
Georges Dallemagne	PSC
Alain Destexhe	PRL-FDF
Nathalie de T' Serclaes	PRL-FDF
Josy Dubié	Ecolo
Jean-Marie Happart	PS
Anne-Marie Lizin	PS
Philippe Mahoux	PS
Philippe Monfils	PRL-FDF
Jacky Morael	Ecolo
Philippe Moureaux	PS
Marie Nagy	Ecolo
Magdeleine Willame-Boonen	PSC

=== Community senators ===
==== Flemish Community (10) ====
Senator	Party
Ludwig Caluwé	CVP
Jacques Devolder	VLD
Johan Malcorps ← Dua	Agalev
Didier Ramoudt	VLD
Jacques Timmermans ← Mahassine	SP
Luc Van den Brande ← Decaluwe	CVP
Chris Vandenbroeke	VU
Joris Van Hauthem	VB
Ingrid van Kessel	CVP
Paul Wille	VLD

==== French-speaking Community (10) ====
Senator	Party
Sfia Bouarfa ← Daif	PS
Marcel Cheron	Ecolo
Olivier de Clippele	PRL-FDF
Armand De Decker	PRL-FDF
Paul Galand	Ecolo
Michel Guilbert ← Hordies	Ecolo
Jean-François Istasse	PS
Francis Poty	PS
François Roelants du Vivier ← Zenner	PRL-FDF
René Thissen	PSC

==== German-speaking Community (1) ====
Senator	Party
Louis Siquet	PS

=== Coopted senators ===
==== Dutch language group (6) ====
Senator	Electoral district
Frank Creyelman	VB
Mia De Schamphelaere	CVP
Mimi Kestelijn-Sierens	VLD
Michiel Maertens	AGALEV
Fatma Pehlivan ← Lindekens	SP
Jan Remans	VLD

==== French language group (4) ====
Senator	Electoral district
Jean Cornil ← Santkin	PS
Marie-José Laloy	PS
Jean-Pierre Malmendier	PRL-FDF
Clotilde Nyssens	PSC

== By party ==
=== Dutch-speaking ===
==== Flemish Liberals and Democrats (11) ====
Senator	Type
Paul De Grauwe	Directly elected
Jean-Marie Dedecker	Directly elected
André Geens ← Verwilghen	Directly elected
Jeannine Leduc	Directly elected
Martine Taelman	Directly elected
Iris Van Riet ← Verhofstadt	Directly elected
Jacques Devolder	Community
Didier Ramoudt	Community
Paul Wille	Community
Mimi Kestelijn-Sierens	Coopted
Jan Remans	Coopted

==== Christian People's Party (10) ====
Senator	Type
Jacques D'Hooghe ← Moreels	Directly elected
Sabine de Bethune	Directly elected
Theo Kelchtermans	Directly elected
Jan Steverlynck ← Dehaene	Directly elected
Erika Thijs	Directly elected
Hugo Vandenberghe	Directly elected
Ludwig Caluwé	Community
Luc Van den Brande ← Decaluwe	Community
Ingrid van Kessel	Community
Mia De Schamphelaere	Coopted

==== Flemish Block (6) ====
Senator	Type
Yves Buysse ← Raes	Directly elected
Jurgen Ceder	Directly elected
Gerda Van Steenberge	Directly elected
Wim Verreycken	Directly elected
Joris Van Hauthem	Community
Frank Creyelman	Coopted

==== Socialist Party (6) ====
Senator	Type
Marcel Colla	Directly elected
Guy Moens	Directly elected
Louis Tobback	Directly elected
Myriam Vanlerberghe	Directly elected
Jacques Timmermans ← Mahassine	Community
Fatma Pehlivan ← Lindekens	Coopted

==== Agalev (5) ====
Senator	Type
Jacinta De Roeck	Directly elected
Meryem Kaçar	Directly elected
Frans Lozie	Directly elected
Johan Malcorps ← Dua	Community
Michiel Maertens	Coopted

==== VU (3) ====
Senator	Type
Patrik Vankrunkelsven	Directly elected
Vincent Van Quickenborne	Directly elected
Chris Vandenbroeke	Community

=== French-speaking ===
==== Liberal Reformist Party/Democratic Front of the Francophones (9) ====
Senator	Type
Philippe Bodson	Directly elected
Christine Cornet d'Elzius ← Michel	Directly elected
Alain Destexhe	Directly elected
Nathalie de T' Serclaes	Directly elected
Philippe Monfils	Directly elected
Olivier de Clippele	Community
Armand De Decker	Community
François Roelants du Vivier ← Zenner	Community
Jean-Pierre Malmendier	Coopted

==== Socialist Party (9) ====
Senator	Type
Jean-Marie Happart	Directly elected
Anne-Marie Lizin	Directly elected
Philippe Mahoux	Directly elected
Philippe Moureaux	Directly elected
Sfia Bouarfa ← Daif	Community
Jean-François Istasse	Community
Francis Poty	Community
Jean Cornil ← Santkin	Coopted
Marie-José Laloy	Coopted

==== Ecolo (6) ====
Senator	Type
Josy Dubié	Directly elected
Jacky Morael	Directly elected
Marie Nagy	Directly elected
Marcel Cheron	Community
Paul Galand	Community
Michel Guilbert ← Hordies	Community

==== Christian Social Party (5) ====
Senator	Type
Michel Barbeaux ← Maystadt	Directly elected
Georges Dallemagne	Directly elected
Magdeleine Willame-Boonen	Directly elected
René Thissen	Community
Clotilde Nyssens	Coopted
