= Same-sex marriage in Belgium =

Same-sex marriage has been legal in Belgium since 1 June 2003. A bill for the legalization of same-sex marriages was passed by the Senate on 28 November 2002, and by the Chamber of Representatives on 30 January 2003. King Albert II granted his assent, and the bill entered into force on 1 June. Polling indicates that a significant majority of Belgians support the legal recognition of same-sex marriage. Belgium was the second country in the world to legalise same-sex marriage, after the Netherlands.

"Statutory cohabitation", a form of civil union open to any two legally consenting cohabiting persons, has been available since 1 January 2000.

== Statutory cohabitation ==
=== Legislative action ===
In 1995, a bill was introduced in the Federal Parliament to provide for a legal framework of "cohabitation agreements". It was mostly intended as a response to the lowering marriage rates rather than giving rights to same-sex couples. In 1998, the bill was changed to "statutory cohabitation" (Dutch: wettelijke samenwoning, pronounced [ˈʋɛtələkə ˈsaːmə(ɱ)ˌʋoːnɪŋ]; French: cohabitation légale, pronounced [kɔ.abitɑsjɔ̃ legal]; German: gesetzliches Zusammenwohnen, pronounced [ɡəˈzɛtslɪçəs tsuˈzamənˌvoːnən]) and finally voted on. The Chamber of Representatives approved it by a 98–10 vote with 32 abstentions and the Senate by a 39–8 vote with 19 abstentions. The Act establishing statutory cohabitation, (Note: Dutch: Wet tot invoering van de wettelijke samenwoning; French: Loi instaurant la cohabitation légale; German: Gesetz zur Einführung des gesetzlichen Zusammenwohnens) also known as the Act of 23 November 1998, amended certain provisions of the Belgian Civil Code and the Belgian Judicial Code to give limited rights to registered same-sex and opposite-sex couples. However, being a couple is not a requirement to make a declaration of statutory cohabitation; relatives can do so too. The law was legally published on 12 January 1999, but would not go into effect until 1 January 2000.

=== Statistics ===
Since 2010, the number of statutory cohabitations contracted every year has remained relatively constant, numbering around 38,000 new unions per year. In 2019, 40,801 new unions were registered (compared to 44,270 marriages) and 26,301 unions were dissolved (compared to 22,435 divorces). In 2022, same-sex couples accounted for about 4% of all unions.

== Same-sex marriage ==
Laws regarding same-sex partnerships in Europe¹ Marriage Civil union Limited domestic recognition (cohabitation) Unrecognized Constitution limits marriage to opposite-sex couples ¹ May include recent laws or court decisions that have not yet entered into effect.

=== Background and summary ===
Same-sex marriage has been legal in Belgium since 1 June 2003, making it the second country in the world to open marriage to same-sex couples, after the Netherlands, and 9 days ahead of the Canadian province of Ontario. Legislation to grant marriage rights to same-sex couples was passed by both chambers of the Federal Parliament in November 2002 and January 2003 with the support of most political parties, and received royal assent on 13 February 2003. In Belgian public discourse, same-sex marriage is commonly known as "marriage for all" or as "homomarriage". (Note: Same-sex marriage is commonly referred to in media and civil society as homohuwelijk (pronounced [ˈɦoːmoːˌɦyʋələk]) or holebihuwelijk in Dutch, as mariage pour tous (pronounced [maʁjaʒ puʁ tus], meaning "marriage for all") in French, and as Ehe für alle (pronounced [ˈeːə fyːɐ̯ ˈʔalə]) in German. In Walloon, it is simply referred to as mariaedje omossecsuwel.)

In the late 1990s, gay rights organisations in Belgium lobbied for the legalization of same-sex marriage. Belgian civil law did not explicitly require that two people be of opposite gender to be able to marry, as this was considered self-evident. Private member's bills in the 1990s by Vlaams Blok senators to add this as an explicit requirement were never considered.

=== Passage of legislation in 2003 ===
The election programmes of the Socialist Party Differently (SP; Flemish Social Democrats), Agalev (Flemish Greens) and the Flemish Liberals and Democrats (VLD; Flemish Liberals) for the 13 June 1999 elections included the aim of legalising same-sex marriage. The Verhofstadt I Government formed after the elections was made up of a coalition of liberal, socialist and green parties and excluded the long-dominant Christian People's Party, who lost the elections due to the Dioxin Affair. The coalition agreement included "implementing a full legal partnership scheme" as well as "immediately making the Act of 23 November 1998 enter into force", which had not been done yet. A royal order signed on 14 December and published on 23 December 1999 made the law on statutory cohabitation go into effect on 1 January 2000.

In 1999, the Socialist Party (PS; French-speaking Social Democrats) and Ecolo (French-speaking Greens) also announced their support for the legalisation of same-sex marriage. At that point, the only remaining party in government that opposed same-sex marriage was the French-speaking Liberal Reformist Party (PRL), which later merged into the Reformist Movement (MR), mainly because it was opposed to adoption rights for same-sex couples. PRL agreed not to block same-sex marriage if adoption rights were excluded. As the first same-sex marriage in the Netherlands was performed on 1 April 2001, the Belgian Government, mostly under the lead of Minister of Health Magda Aelvoet (Agalev), began considering it as well. On 22 June, the Council of Ministers formally approved opening marriage to same-sex couples. In September, the largest opposition party, the Christian People's Party, held a party convention where they rebranded into Christian Democratic and Flemish (CD&V), with a renewed party platform, including the aim of legalising same-sex marriage, put forward by their youth wing. However, the Council of State issued a negative legal opinion on the bill on 30 November 2001, stating that "marriage is defined as the union of a man and a woman". LGBT organisations and government ministers criticised the opinion and said they would proceed with the legislation. The Council of Ministers formally approved the government bill on 8 December 2001 and in second reading on 30 January 2002, and submitted it to the Chamber of Representatives on 14 March 2002, where it faced a Justice Committee overloaded with bills to consider. In May 2002, the government bill was withdrawn from the Chamber and instead introduced as a private member's bill (which does not require opinions by the Council of State) in the Senate by the group leaders of the majority parties, Jeannine Leduc (VLD), Philippe Mahoux (PS), Philippe Monfils (MR), Myriam Vanlerberghe (SP), Marie Nagy (Ecolo) and Frans Lozie (Agalev).

As Minister Aelvoet resigned on 28 August 2002 and elections were to be held in June 2003, the fate of the bill was unclear. Some politicians also accused Philippe Monfils of deliberately stalling the bill. Nevertheless, new momentum was gained at the start of the new parliamentary year in October 2002. The Senate Justice Committee held hearings and voted 11–4 to approve the bill. It passed in the full Senate on 28 November 2002, with 46 votes to 15 and 4 abstentions, and on 30 January 2003 the bill passed the Chamber of Representatives by 91 votes to 22 and 9 abstentions. The Flemish Liberals and Democrats, Christian Democratic and Flemish, the Socialist Party, the Socialist Party Differently, Ecolo, Agalev and the People's Union voted generally in favour except for several abstentions, whereas the Vlaams Blok and National Front voted against, the Humanist Democratic Centre voted against with several abstentions and the Reformist Movement voted mostly against.

28 November 2002 vote in the Senate
Party	Voted for	Voted against	Abstained	Absent (Did not vote)
G Flemish Liberals and Democrats	11: Jean-Marie Dedecker; Paul De Grauwe; Jacques Devolder; André Geens; Mimi Kestelijn-Sierens; Jeannine Leduc; Didier Ramoudt; Jan Remans; Martine Taelman; Iris Van Riet; Paul Wille	–	–	–
Christian Democratic and Flemish	6: Ludwig Caluwé; Sabine de Bethune; Theo Kelchtermans; Erika Thijs; Hugo Vandenberghe; Ingrid van Kessel	–	1: Mia De Schamphelaere	3: Jacques D'Hooghe; Jan Steverlynck; Luc Van den Brande
G Socialist Party	9: Sfia Bouarfa; Jean Cornil; Jean-Marie Happart; Jean-François Istasse; Marie-José Laloy; Anne-Marie Lizin; Philippe Mahoux; Philippe Moureaux; Francis Poty	–	–	1: Louis Siquet
G Reformist Movement	1: François Roelants du Vivier	5: Christine Cornet d'Elzius; Olivier de Clippele; Armand De Decker; Nathalie de T' Serclaes; Jean-Pierre Malmendier	1: Philippe Monfils	2: Philippe Bodson; Alain Destexhe
G Socialist Party Differently	6: Marcel Colla; Guy Moens; Fatma Pehlivan; Jacques Timmermans; Louis Tobback; Myriam Vanlerberghe	–	–	–
G Ecolo	5: Marcel Cheron; Josy Dubié; Michel Guilbert; Jacky Morael; Marie Nagy	–	1: Paul Galand	–
Vlaams Blok	–	6: Yves Buysse; Jurgen Ceder; Frank Creyelman; Gerda Staveaux-Van Steenberge; Joris Van Hauthem; Wim Verreycken	–	–
G Agalev	5: Jacinta De Roeck; Meryem Kaçar; Frans Lozie; Michiel Maertens; Johan Malcorps	–	–	–
Humanist Democratic Centre	–	4: Michel Barbeaux; Clotilde Nyssens; René Thissen; Magdeleine Willame-Boonen	1: Georges Dallemagne	–
People's Union (Note: The party had recently split, but was still technically together as a parliamentary group.)	3: Chris Vandenbroeke; Patrik Vankrunkelsven; Vincent Van Quickenborne	–	–	–
Total	46	15	4	6
Total	64.8%	21.1%	5.6%	8.5%

30 January 2003 vote in the Chamber of Representatives
Party	Voted for	Voted against	Abstained	Absent (Did not vote)
G Flemish Liberals and Democrats	19: Filip Anthuenis; Yolande Avontroodt; Pierre Chevalier; Willy Cortois; Hugo Coveliers; Maggie De Block; Herman De Croo; Jan Eeman; Stef Goris; Guy Hove; Martial Lahaye; Georges Lenssen; Fientje Moerman; Hugo Philtjens; Tony Smets; Bart Somers; Arnold Van Aperen; Frans Verhelst; Geert Versnick	–	1: Jef Valkeniers	4: Jacques Germeaux; Pierre Lano; Karel Pinxten; Ludo Van Campenhout
Christian Democratic and Flemish	17: Jos Ansoms; Hubert Brouns; Simonne Creyf; Pieter De Crem; Roel Deseyn; Greta D'hondt; Mark Eyskens; Marcel Hendrickx; Yves Leterme; Dirk Pieters; Trees Pieters; Paul Tant; Jo Vandeurzen; Jozef Van Eetvelt; Marc Van Peel; Daniël Vanpoucke; Servais Verherstraeten	–	3: Luc Goutry; Tony Van Parys; Herman Van Rompuy	1: Joke Schauvliege
G Socialist Party	14: Colette Burgeon; Léon Campstein; Jacques Chabot; Maurice Dehu; Jean-Marc Delizée; Jean Depreter; Claude Eerdekens; André Frédéric; Jean-Pol Henry; Charles Janssens; Karine Lalieux; Yvan Mayeur; Patrick Moriau; Bruno Van Grootenbrulle	–	–	5: José Canon; François Dufour; Thierry Giet; Yvon Harmegnies; Guy Larcier
G Reformist Movement	6: Daniel Bacquelaine; Olivier Chastel; Corinne De Permentier; Denis D'hondt; Olivier Maingain; Jacques Simonet	8: Anne Barzin; François Bellot; Pierrette Cahay-André; Philippe Collard; Jacqueline Herzet; Robert Hondermarcq; Philippe Seghin; Serge Van Overtveldt	–	4: Georges Clerfayt; Robert Denis; Josée Lejeune; Eric van Weddingen
Vlaams Blok	–	11: Gerolf Annemans; Roger Bouteca; Koen Bultinck; Filip De Man; Hagen Goyvaerts; Bart Laeremans; Bert Schoofs; John Spinnewyn; Guido Tastenhoye; Jaak Van Den Broeck; Francis Van den Eynde	–	4: Alexandra Colen; Guy D'Haeseleer; Jan Mortelmans; Luc Sevenhans
G Socialist Party Differently	10: Hans Bonte; Magda De Meyer; Fred Erdman; Els Haegeman; Patrick Lansens; Daan Schalck; Ludwig Vandenhove; Dirk Van der Maelen; Peter Vanvelthoven; Henk Verlinde	–	–	4: Marcel Bartholomeeussen; Dalila Douifi; Jan Peeters; André Schellens
G Ecolo	10: Bernard Baille; Marie-Thérèse Coenen; Martine Dardenne; Claudine Drion; Zoé Genot; Muriel Gerkens; Michèle Gilkinet; Gérard Gobert; Mirella Minne; Géraldine Pelzer-Salandra	–	–	–
Humanist Democratic Centre	–	2: Joseph Arens; André Smets	4: Jean-Pierre Detremmerie; Richard Fournaux; Jean-Pierre Grafé; Jacques Lefevre	4: Raymond Langendries; Joëlle Milquet; Luc Paque; Jean-Jacques Viseur
G Agalev	9: Liliane De Cock; Anne-Mie Descheemaeker; Kristien Grauwels; Leen Laenens; Simonne Leen; Fauzaya Talhaoui; Peter Vanhoutte; Lode Vanoost; Joos Wauters	–	–	–
People's Union	5: Alfons Borginon; Danny Pieters; Annemie Van de Casteele; Karel Van Hoorebeke; Els Van Weert)	–	1: Frieda Brepoels	2: Geert Bourgeois; Ferdy Willems (Agalev)
National Front	–	1: Daniel Féret	–	–
Independent	1: Vincent Decroly	–	–	–
Total	91	22	9	28
Total	60.7%	14.7%	6.0%	18.7%

King Albert II signed and promulgated the bill on 13 February 2003. It was published in the Belgian Official Gazette on 28 February and came into force on 1 June.

The first paragraph of article 143 of the Belgian Civil Code (Book I, Title V, Chapter I) now reads as follows:

- in Dutch: Een huwelijk kan worden aangegaan door twee personen van verschillend of van hetzelfde geslacht.
- in French: Deux personnes de sexe différent ou de même sexe peuvent contracter mariage.
- in German: Zwei Personen verschiedenen oder gleichen Geschlechts können eine Ehe eingehen.

(Two persons of different sex or of the same sex may contract marriage.)

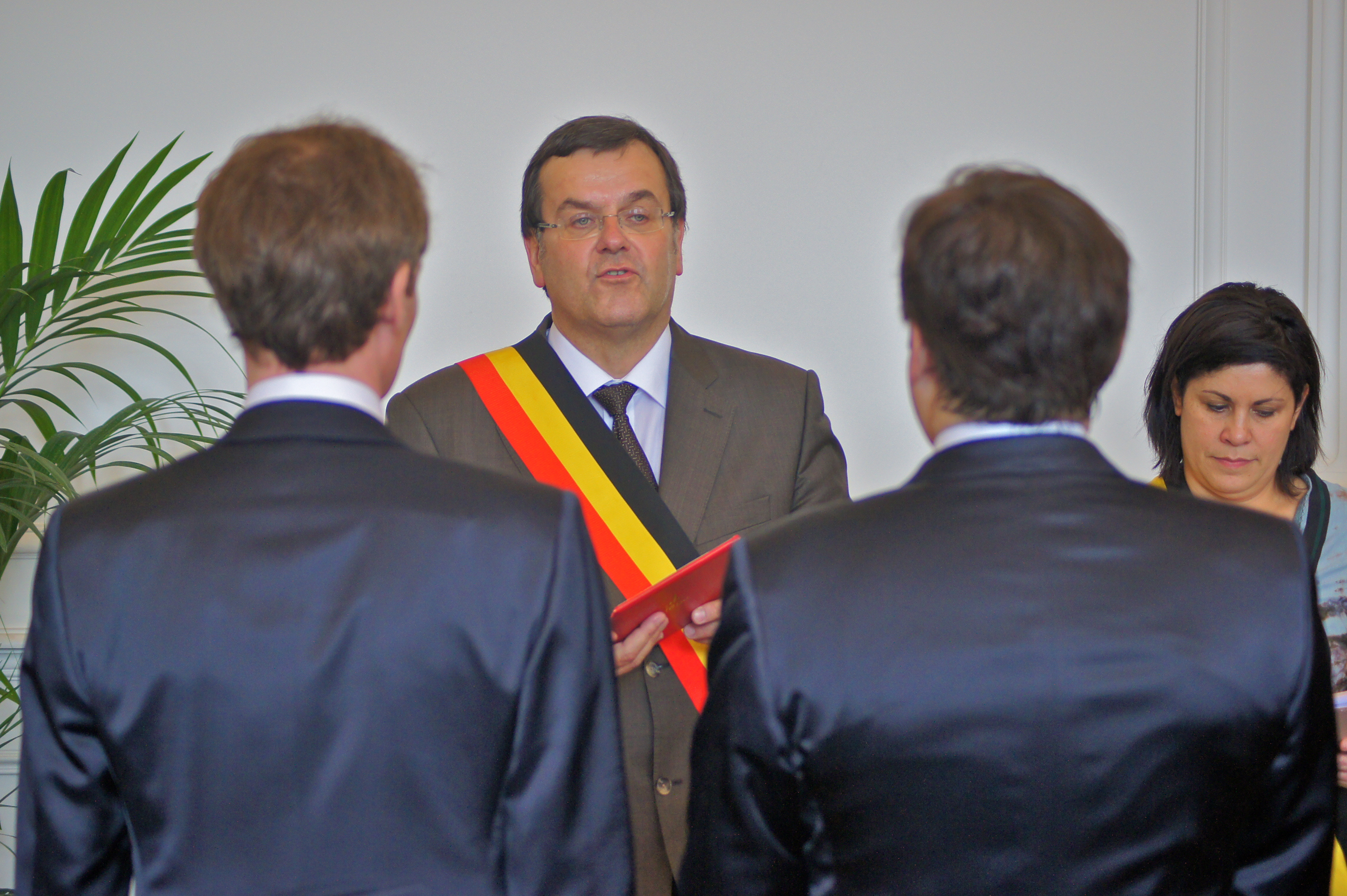
Mayor Willy Demeyer officiating at the wedding of a same-sex couple in Liège, 2013

The first female couple married on 6 June 2003 and the first male couple on 13 June 2003, both in Kapellen, near Antwerp.

In November 2003, opponents of same-sex marriage petitioned the Arbitration Court to invalidate the law as unconstitutional. Their main argument held that treating fundamentally different situations the same way violated the equality principle of the Constitution. In October 2004, the Arbitration Court, nowadays known as the Constitutional Court, rejected the request.

=== Subsequent changes ===
Originally, Belgium allowed the marriages of foreign same-sex couples only if their country of origin also allowed these unions. A circulaire issued by Minister of Justice Laurette Onkelinx on 23 January 2004, however, permits any couple to marry in Belgium if at least one of the spouses has lived in the country for a minimum of three months. This was codified into the Code of Private International Law, which took effect on 1 October 2004.

The same-sex marriage law did not permit adoption by same-sex partners, and as birth within a same-sex marriage did not imply affiliation, the same-sex spouse of the biological parent had no way to become a legal parent. A proposal to permit adoption was approved 77–62 with 7 abstentions by the Chamber of Representatives on 1 December 2005, and 34–33 with 2 abstentions by the Senate on 20 April 2006. It received royal assent on 18 May and went into force on 30 June 2006.

A legal inequality persisted for lesbian couples compared to heterosexual couples with regard to parentage; under article 135 of the Belgian Civil Code, the husband of a biological mother is automatically recognised as the child's legal father, but this was not the case for the wife of the mother in a same-sex union. To be recognised as the co-mother, she was required to complete an adoption procedure—a situation that accounted for the majority of adoption cases in Belgium. The Di Rupo Government promised to address this disparity, and in 2014, as the Netherlands had recently passed similar legislation, LGBT organisations pressured the government to act. In response, legislators worked to agree on a solution. A bill to this end was approved by the Senate on 3 April 2014 on a 48–2 vote with one abstention, and by the Chamber of Representatives on 23 April on a 114–10 vote with one abstention. The bill received royal assent by King Philippe of Belgium on 5 May and went into effect on 1 January 2015. Since then, lesbian couples have been treated equally to heterosexual couples: the co-mother married to the biological mother is automatically recognised as a legal parent, and an unmarried partner can formally acknowledge the child at the civil registry. An equivalent legal framework for male same-sex couples has not yet been established, due to ongoing controversy surrounding surrogacy.

=== Royal same-sex weddings ===
In October 2021, the government confirmed that members of the Belgian royal family may enter into same-sex marriages without having to forfeit the crown, or lose their royal titles and privileges or their place in the line of succession. This followed similar announcements concerning other European royal families.

=== Statistics ===
According to Statistics Belgium, approximately 2,000 same-sex couples were married between June 2003 and December 2004 (874 in 2003 and 1,133 in 2004). This constituted 1.9 percent of the total number of marriages in Belgium during that period, with male couples accounting for about 58% of all same-sex marriages. The share of same-sex marriages among all marriages differs from region to region. In 2024, almost 3.7% of marriages in Brussels, 3.1% in Flanders and 2.9% in Wallonia were same-sex marriages. The province with the lowest rate was Flemish Brabant (2.5%) and the one with the highest rate was West Flanders (3.4%).

Figures for 2020 are lower than previous years because of the restrictions in place due to the COVID-19 pandemic.

Number of same-sex marriages performed in Belgium
Subdivision	2014	2015	2016	2017	2018	2019	2020	2021	2022	2023	2024	Total
Antwerp	193	199	240	200	233	210	187	202	243	288	261	2,456
Brussels	133	136	133	117	144	144	109	118	160	161	166	1,521
East Flanders	178	168	185	178	203	162	144	187	199	194	211	2,009
Flemish Brabant	108	92	100	94	106	107	78	76	95	105	108	1,069
Hainaut	79	80	90	91	86	100	69	108	163	134	132	1,132
Liège	68	75	80	78	75	79	52	107	128	123	113	978
Limburg	84	91	78	90	68	87	73	65	100	95	116	947
Luxembourg	16	16	12	15	12	18	12	23	36	20	36	216
Namur	31	43	34	40	32	38	21	29	47	42	44	401
Walloon Brabant	22	32	33	35	29	18	14	22	24	33	38	300
West Flanders	136	124	141	134	132	122	114	114	155	161	155	1,488
Outside Belgium	41	35	44	40	55	43	36	36	32	38	71	471
Total	1,089	1,091	1,170	1,112	1,175	1,128	909	1,087	1,382	1,394	1,451	12,988

=== Religious performance ===
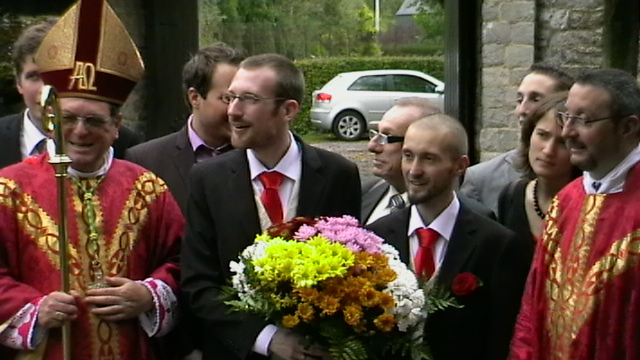
A same-sex marriage in an Old Catholic church near Namur, October 2009

The United Protestant Church in Belgium has allowed its congregations to perform same-sex marriages since 2007. Pastors are under no obligation to solemnize same-sex marriages if this would violate their personal beliefs. Solemnizations of same-sex marriages are also possible in the Old Catholic Church of Belgium.

The Catholic Church opposes same-sex marriage and does not allow its priests to officiate at such marriages. In February 2010, Father Germain Dufour, a former Ecolo parliamentarian, blessed the marriage of a same-sex couple in a Catholic church in Liège, provoking much controversy in Catholic circles. In September 2022, Roman Catholic bishops in Flanders issued a document permitting same-sex unions to be blessed in their churches. The document allows for a ritual which includes a prayer and a final benediction in front of family and friends. It emphasised that while such blessings did not alter the Catholic doctrine on "sacramental marriage," the move would allow the Church to be "pastorally close to homosexual persons" and a "welcoming [place] that excludes no one." In December 2023, the Holy See published Fiducia supplicans, a declaration allowing Catholic priests to bless couples who are not considered to be married according to church teaching, including the blessing of same-sex couples. The Bishop of Antwerp, Johan Bonny, welcomed the declaration, saying, "It helps us move forward."

== Public opinion ==
The 2006 Eurobarometer found that 62% of Belgian respondents thought same-sex marriages should be allowed in Europe. A 2008 survey by Delta Lloyd Life found that 76% of Belgians supported same-sex marriage and 46% thought that same-sex couples could raise children just as well as opposite-sex couples. A May 2013 Ipsos poll found that 67% of respondents were in favour of same-sex marriage and another 12% supported another form of recognition for same-sex couples. According to an Ifop poll conducted that same month, 71% of Belgians supported allowing same-sex couples to marry and adopt children.

The 2015 Eurobarometer found that 77% of Belgians thought same-sex marriage should be allowed throughout Europe, while 20% were opposed. A Pew Research Center poll, conducted between April and August 2017 and published in May 2018, showed that 82% of Belgian people supported same-sex marriage, 10% were opposed and 8% did not know or had refused to answer. When divided by religion, 88% of religiously unaffiliated people, 83% of non-practicing Christians and 66% of church-attending Christians supported same-sex marriage. Opposition was 9% among 18–34-year-olds.

The 2019 Eurobarometer found that 82% of Belgians thought same-sex marriage should be allowed throughout Europe, while 17% were opposed. The 2023 Eurobarometer found that support was 79%, while 19% were opposed. The survey also showed that 80% of Belgians thought that "there is nothing wrong in a sexual relationship between two persons of the same sex", while 18% disagreed.

== See also ==
- 2003 in LGBT rights
- LGBT rights in Belgium
- Recognition of same-sex unions in Europe
