= List of members of the Senate of Belgium, 1995–1999 =

This is the list of Belgian Senators from 1995 till 1999.

== Election results (21 May 1995) ==
| Party | Votes | % | Seats | | | |
| Party | Votes | % | Won | Community | Co-opted | Total |
|---|---|---|---|---|---|---|
| Christian People's Party | 1,009,656 | 16.85 | 7 | 3 | 2 | 12 |
| Flemish Liberals and Democrats | 796,154 | 13.29 | 6 | 2 | 2 | 10 |
| Socialistische Partij | 792,941 | 13.23 | 6 | 2 | 1 | 9 |
| Parti Socialiste | 764,610 | 12.76 | 5 | 4 | 2 | 11 |
| Liberal Reformist Party–Democratic Front of Francophones | 672,798 | 11.23 | 5 | 3 | 1 | 9 |
| Vlaams Blok | 463,896 | 7.74 | 3 | 1 | 1 | 5 |
| Christian Social Party | 434,492 | 7.25 | 3 | 3 | 1 | 7 |
| People's Union | 318,453 | 5.31 | 2 | 1 | 0 | 3 |
| Ecolo | 258,635 | 4.32 | 2 | 1 | 0 | 3 |
| Agalev | 223,355 | 3.73 | 1 | 1 | 0 | 2 |
| Aging with Dignity (Wallonia) | 32,913 | 0.55 | 0 | 0 | 0 | 0 |
| BANAAN | 31,956 | 0.53 | 0 | 0 | 0 | 0 |
| SAMUEL | 31,392 | 0.52 | 0 | 0 | 0 | 0 |
| VLAAMS | 22,632 | 0.38 | 0 | 0 | 0 | 0 |
| Workers' Party of Belgium (Flanders) | 21,607 | 0.36 | 0 | 0 | 0 | 0 |
| HOERA | 20,790 | 0.35 | 0 | 0 | 0 | 0 |
| Aging with Dignity (Flanders) | 20,426 | 0.34 | 0 | 0 | 0 | 0 |
| Workers' Party of Belgium (Wallonia) | 16,667 | 0.28 | 0 | 0 | 0 | 0 |
| United Left | 15,994 | 0.27 | 0 | 0 | 0 | 0 |
| Party of German-speaking Belgians | 13,762 | 0.23 | 0 | 0 | 0 | 0 |
| Parti Communautaire National-Européen | 10,058 | 0.17 | 0 | 0 | 0 | 0 |
| D | 7,567 | 0.13 | 0 | 0 | 0 | 0 |
| Flemish People's Party | 7,187 | 0.12 | 0 | 0 | 0 | 0 |
| Natural Law Party | 4,384 | 0.07 | 0 | 0 | 0 | 0 |
| Total | 5,992,325 | 100.00 | 40 | 21 | 10 | 71 |
| Valid votes | 5,992,325 | 91.32 | | | | |
| Invalid/blank votes | 569,783 | 8.68 | | | | |
| Total votes | 6,562,108 | 100.00 | | | | |
| Registered voters/turnout | 7,199,440 | 91.15 | | | | |
Source: Belgian Elections, IPU

== By type ==
=== Senators by Right ===
| Senator | Party | Office entered |
|---|---|---|
| Prince Philippe | No affiliation | 21 June 1994 |
| Princess Astrid | No affiliation | 20 November 1996 |

=== Directly elected senators ===
==== Dutch electoral college (25) ====
| Senator | Party |
|---|---|
| Bert Anciaux | VU–ID |
| André Bourgeois ← Dehaene | CVP |
| Eddy Boutmans | Agalev |
| Ludwig Caluwé ← Moreels | CVP |
| Jurgen Ceder | VB |
| Hugo Coveliers | VLD |
| Jacques D'Hooghe ← Smet | CVP |
| Sabine de Bethune | CVP |
| Stephan Goris | VLD |
| Jeannine Leduc | VLD |
| Jan Loones | VU–ID |
| Nadia Merchiers | SP |
| Guy Moens | SP |
| Lisette Nelis-Van Liedekerke | VLD |
| Eric Pinoie | SP |
| Roeland Raes | VB |
| Paul Staes | CVP |
| Frank Swaelen | CVP |
| Paula Sémer | SP |
| Erika Thijs | CVP |
| Louis Tobback ← Van Goethem ← Tobback | SP |
| Francy Van der Wildt | SP |
| Valère Vautmans ← Neyts | VLD |
| Guy Verhofstadt | VLD |
| Wim Verreycken | VB |

==== French electoral college (15) ====
| Senator | Party |
|---|---|
| Jean Bock | PRL–FDF |
| Philippe Busquin | PS |
| Christine Cornet d'Elzius | PRL–FDF |
| Martine Dardenne | Ecolo |
| Andrée Delcourt-Pêtre | PSC |
| Pierre Jonckheer | Ecolo |
| Claude Desmedt | PRL–FDF |
| Alain Destexhe | PRL–FDF |
| Jean-Marie Happart ← Onkelinx | PS |
| Roger Lallemand | PS |
| Philippe Mahoux | PS |
| Jacqueline Mayence-Goossens | PRL–FDF |
| Joëlle Milquet ← Deprez | PSC |
| Charles-Ferdinand Nothomb | PSC |
| Robert Urbain | PS |

=== Community senators ===
==== Flemish Community (10) ====
| Senator | Party |
|---|---|
| Leo Delcroix | CVP |
| Jacques Devolder | VLD |
| Vera Dua | Agalev |
| Leo Goovaerts | VLD |
| Patrick Hostekint | SP |
| Marc Olivier | CVP |
| Joris Van Hauthem | VB |
| Tuur Van Wallendael ← Maximus | SP |
| Chris Vandenbroeke | VU–ID |
| Johan Weyts | CVP |

==== French-speaking Community (10) ====
| Senator | Party |
|---|---|
| Philippe Charlier | PSC |
| José Daras | Ecolo |
| Armand De Decker | PRL–FDF |
| Michel Foret | PRL–FDF |
| Pierre Hazette ← Monfils | PRL–FDF |
| Robert Hotyat | PS |
| Jean-François Istasse ← Mouton | PS |
| Francis Poty | PS |
| Jacques Santkin | PS |
| Magdeleine Willame-Boonen | PSC |

==== German-language Community (1) ====
| Senator | Party |
|---|---|
| Hubert Chantraine | PSC |

=== Coopted senators ===
==== Dutch language group (6) ====
| Senator | Party |
|---|---|
| Door Buelens | VB |
| Bea Cantillon | CVP |
| Luc Coene | VLD |
| Fred Erdman | SP |
| Hugo Vandenberghe | CVP |
| Fons Vergote | VLD |

==== French language group (4) ====
| Senator | Party |
|---|---|
| Guy Charlier | PS |
| Paul Hatry | PRL–FDF |
| Dominique Jeanmoye ← Bribosia ← Bouchat | PSC |
| Anne-Marie Lizin | PS |
