= Oudenaarde-Aalst (Flemish Parliament constituency) =

Former Belgian legislative constituency in Flanders

Oudenaarde-Aalst was a constituency used to elect members of the Flemish Parliament between 1995 and 2003.

== Representatives ==
Election	MFP (Party)	MFP (Party)	MFP (Party)	MFP (Party)	MFP (Party)	MFP (Party)	MFP (Party)	MFP (Party)
1995	Karim Van Overmeire (VB)	Joseph Browaeys (VLD)	Gracienne van Nieuwenborg (PS)	Jacques Timmermans (PS)	Mark Van der Poorten (CVP)	Leonard Quintelier (CVP)	Herman De Loor (PS)	Annie De Maght (VLD)
1999	Karim Van Overmeire (VB)	Joseph Browaeys (VLD)	Gracienne van Nieuwenborg (PS)	Jacques Timmermans (PS)	Mark Van der Poorten (CVP)	Julien Librecht (VB)	André-Emiel Bogaert (VU)	Annie De Maght (VLD)
