= Van Lerberghe =

van Lerberghe or Vanlerberghe is a surname. Notable people with the surname include:

- Bert Van Lerberghe, Belgian professional racing cyclist
- Charles van Lerberghe (1861–1907), Flemish poet
- Eric Vanlerberghe, Member of I Prevail
- Henri Van Lerberghe (1891–1966), Belgian cyclist
- Jennie Vanlerberghe, Belgian journalist
- Jordi Vanlerberghe, Belgian footballer
- Jurgen Vanlerberghe, Belgian politician
- Myriam Vanlerberghe, Belgian politician
- Oscar Vanlerberghe, Belgian politician,
- Paul Van Lerberghe, Flemish French writing poet,
