= Pierre Chevalier =

Pierre Chevalier may refer to:

- Pierre Chevalier (caver) (1905–2001), French caver, mountaineer and explorer
- Pierre Chevalier (director) (1915–2005), French film director
- Pierre Chevalier (politician) (born 1952), Belgian politician
- Pierre Chevalier (cyclist), French cyclist
- Pierre Michel François Chevalier (1818–1863), Breton nationalist author
