= Zenner =

Zenner is a surname. Notable people with the surname include:

- Alain Zenner (born 1946), Belgian politician
- Carl Zenner (1899-1969), German politician
- Christin Zenner (born 1991), German swimmer
- Daren Zenner (born 1971), American boxer
- Zach Zenner (born 1991), American football player
