= 2003 in LGBTQ rights =

This is a list of notable events in the history of LGBTQ rights that took place in the year 2003.

== Events ==
- The US state of California bans gender identity discrimination in the private sector.
- The US state of New Mexico bans discrimination based on sexual orientation or gender identity in the private sector.
- Publication of Louis Crompton's 648-page, world-spanning study Homosexuality & Civilization by Harvard University Press. (ISBN 0-674-01197-X)

=== January ===
- 30 — In Belgium, legislation to allow same-sex couples to marry becomes active. Because of Belgian requirements for marriage, it will take until June before the first same-sex marriages are actually performed. The legal rights are not completely equal to opposite-sex marriage because couples lack adoption rights.

=== March ===
- 13 — In the United States, The Census Bureau releases figures showing that 34.3 percent of households headed by lesbian couples, and 22.3 percent of those headed by gay male couples are raising children. The report also shows that 99.3 percent of counties in the U.S. have households headed by same-sex couples.
- 24 — New Mexico governor Bill Richardson signs the New Mexico Hate Crimes Act, establishing enhanced penalties for hate crimes, including anti-gay hate crimes.

=== May ===
- 21 — Marilyn Musgrave, U.S. congresswoman from Colorado, introduces the Federal Marriage Amendment in the country's House of Representatives with 108 co-sponsors.
- 28 — Rick Perry, governor of the U.S. state of Texas, signs the Texas Defense of Marriage Act. The act allows Texas to deny recognition of same-sex marriages and other forms of same-sex partnerships performed in other states.
- 30 — Paul E. Patton, governor of the U.S. state of Kentucky, signs an executive order banning public-sector discrimination based on sexual orientation or gender identity.

=== June ===
- 10 — The United States Department of Justice reverses an earlier decision banning the annual employee gay pride event.
- 10 — Michael Stark and Michael Leshner are wed in Ontario, becoming the first legal same-sex marriage in Canada.
- 18 — Canadian province of Ontario appeals court rules that civil same-sex marriages will be recognized as valid by the government, making Canada the first country in the Americas to honor legal same-sex marriage.
- 21 — Janet Napolitano, governor of the U.S. state of Arizona, issues an executive order banning sexual orientation discrimination in the public sector.
- 26 — The Supreme Court of the United States strikes down all remaining US state sodomy laws in Lawrence v. Texas.
- 27 — In its first application of the Lawrence precedent, the Supreme Court vacates the Kansas Supreme Court's decision in Limon v. Kansas.

=== July ===
- 2 — Wal-Mart Stores, Inc. adds "sexual orientation" to its corporate non-discrimination policy.
- 28 — Ed Rendell, governor of the U.S. state of Pennsylvania, issues an executive order banning gender identity discrimination in the public sector.
- 30 — George W. Bush, president of the United States, says he supports "codifying marriage in the United States as being between one man and one woman."
- 31 — Jerrold Nadler, U.S. congressman from New York, reintroduces the Permanent Partners Immigration Act (H.R 832) in the U.S. House of Representatives. Patrick Leahy, U.S. senator from Vermont, also introduces the proposal as S. 1510 in the U.S. Senate.

=== August ===
United Nations Human Rights Committee decides the case Young v. Australia, concerning pension rights of surviving partner.

=== September ===
- 18 — The bill to repeal Section 28 in the remaining parts United Kingdom (England and Wales and Northern Ireland) receives Royal Assent. Section 28 had already been repealed within Scotland in 2000. The UK repeal became active on November 18.

=== October ===
- 27 — Statistics from the U.S. Federal Bureau of Investigation show that 16.7 percent of hate crimes committed in the country in 2002 were due to bias against the victim's perceived sexual orientation, the highest rate in the 12 years federal records have been kept.
- 29 — A Human Rights Campaign study shows 60 percent of American adoption agencies accept applications from gay and lesbian couples and 40 percent claim to have placed children in homes headed by same-sex couples.

=== November ===
- 15 — Canadian politician Ted Nebbeling marries his partner of 32 years in what is believed to be the first same-sex marriage of a cabinet minister.
- 18
  - In Goodridge v. Department of Public Health, the Massachusetts Supreme Judicial Court declares that a ban on same-sex marriage in Massachusetts is unconstitutional. It's the first such decision by a U.S. state's highest court.
  - Repeal of Section 28 becomes effective in England, Wales, and Northern Ireland
- 20 — The United States Congress passes a resolution condemning all violations of internationally recognized human rights norms based on the real or perceived sexual orientation or gender identity of an individual.
- 26
  - In the United Kingdom, the Queen's Speech, which gives the government's program of legislation for the year ahead, includes a bill to allow Civil Partnerships for same-sex couples.
  - In the United States Senate, the Federal Marriage Amendment is introduced by Wayne Allard of Colorado, Sam Brownback of Kansas, Jim Bunning of Kentucky, James Inhofe of Oklahoma, and Jeff Sessions of Alabama.

=== December ===
- 1 — In the United Kingdom, the Employment Equality (Sexual Orientation) Regulations 2003 are introduced, making discrimination against lesbian, gay and bisexual employees unlawful. However, the regulations do not apply to pension rights or to employees of religious organisations.
- 6 — Houston, Texas, city councilmember Annise Parker defeats fellow councilmember Bruce Tatro as Houston's first lesbian city controller.
- 23 — Michigan governor Jennifer Granholm signs an executive order banning employment discrimination based on sexual orientation.

== Deaths ==
- January 19 — Morris Kight, 83, gay rights activist
- January 22 — Sarah Pettit, 36, co-founder of Out magazine
- December 10 — Bob Ross, 69, founder and publisher of the Bay Area Reporter
- December 25 — Jim Osgood, 71, gay rights advocate and leader of Mattachine Midwest

== See also ==
- Timeline of LGBT history — timeline of events from 12,000 BCE to present
- LGBT rights by country or territory — current legal status around the world
- LGBT social movements
