= Semira Adamu =

Twenty year old woman who was killed in Belgium

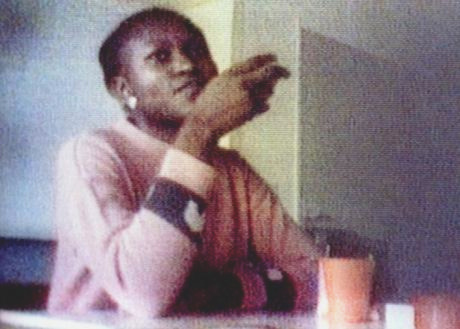
- Born: 15 April 1978; Kaduna, Nigeria
- Died: 22 September 1998 (aged 20); Brussels, Belgium
- Cause of death: Suffocation

Semira Precious Adamu (15 April 1978 – 22 September 1998) was a 20-year-old Nigerian asylum seeker who was suffocated to death by two Belgian police officers on a aeroplane in Brussels, Belgium, during her forced deportation on September 22, 1998. The police officers recorded video footage of themselves exchanging jokes as they pushed her head deep into a pillow for 20 minutes with her hands and ankles handcuffed; during which Adamu had stopped breathing for 7 to 8 minutes. She died in the St Luc Hospital later the same day at 9:32pm. When the court asked why so much force was used, one of the officers said that it was necessary "to avoid disturbing other passengers".

Of the 9 police officers who surrounded Adamu on the plane set off for Togo during the sixth attempt to deport her, 4 were given suspended sentences for involuntary murder in December 2003. The chief police officer received a 14-month sentence, and 3 other officers were given 1-year sentences. A fifth police officer was acquitted. Undisclosed damages were paid by the Belgian state to Adamu's family as ordered by the court.

== Background ==
Adamu had fled Nigeria in March 1998 because she was forced to marry a 65-year-old man she did not know. He had already married four other women and allegedly killed one of them. Adamu's intended destination was Berlin, but as the plane stopped over at Zaventem, she was taken to the 127bis Detention Centre in Steenokkerzeel as a result of their safe third country rule on March 26, 1998. She was questioned there for the first time and was denied entry; after an appeal against this decision, a second interview decided to forcibly deport her.

The Belgian authorities made 5 attempts to deport Adamu. Her lawyer stated that she was warned that any violence inflicted upon her "would be her own fault", and that she had feared for her own life. Adamu had become a cause célèbre and her situation led to demonstrations around Steenokkerzeel. On 20th September, she appeared in a television documentary on rejected refugees. In it, Adamu gave a detailed description of the 4th attempt to deport her:

"I was woken at 6:30 a.m. and given 20 minutes to prepare for departure... When we arrived at the airport my hands and feet were bound and I was thrown into an isolation cell for over three hours. At 11:15 they forced me onto the plane. I began to scream and cry as I was surrounded by six gendarmes and two men from Sabena. The airline men pushed me around and one held a cushion to my face. He almost suffocated me. These men were supposed to accompany me all the way to Lome. Passengers intervened at this point, saying that they would get off the plane if the men did not let me go."

== Reactions ==
The announcement of Adamu's death led to grassroots protests in Belgium. A few hundred people surrounded the detention camp. Inmates went on hunger strikes.

This caused the Belgian deputy prime minister and home office minister Louis Tobback to resign.
