= Steven Creyelman =

Belgian politician

Steven Creyelman (born Dendermonde, 25 October 1972) is a Belgian-Flemish politician for Vlaams Belang (VB) and since 2019 an MP in the Chamber of Representatives.

== Biography ==
Creyelman studied business engineering at EHSAL in Brussels. From 2001 to 2017, he also owned the web design company Webbreezer Solutions in Bruges and in 2009, became a webmaster for Vlaams Belang. He has also served as the spokesman and chairman for the party in the Dendermonde-Sint-Niklaas region. In the 2019 Belgian federal election, Creyelman was elected to the Belgian federal parliament for the East Flanders region representing the VB. He served on the parliamentary committee for defense and was chairman for the Committee on Army Purchasing. Creyelman is also a councilor for Buggenhout municipal council.

His brother is former senator Frank Creyelman who was also active in Vlaams Belang.

== Chinese spying controversies ==
In December 2023, his brother Frank Creyelman was expelled from Vlaams Belang after an investigation by Belgian police and journalists revealed that Frank Creyelman had been involved in Chinese espionage. The report also uncovered a series of text messages between Steven Creyelman and his brother which suggested Frank Creyelman had approached him with assignments and requests due to his role in the defense purchase committee. In the wake of that scandal, Steven Creyelman denied any knowledge of his brother's involvement and immediately distanced himself from his actions, but resigned as Chairman of the Belgian Chambre of Representatives' standing committee on defense purchases. A subsequent interview and investigation by the State Security Service cleared Steven Creyelman of any wrongdoing and found no direct links to influence by the Chinese government, but Creyelman announced he would stand down as a candidate for Vlaams Belang at the next federal election where he had been on third place on the East Flanders list and concentrate on local politics.
