= Dany Vandenbossche =

Belgian politician (1956–2013)

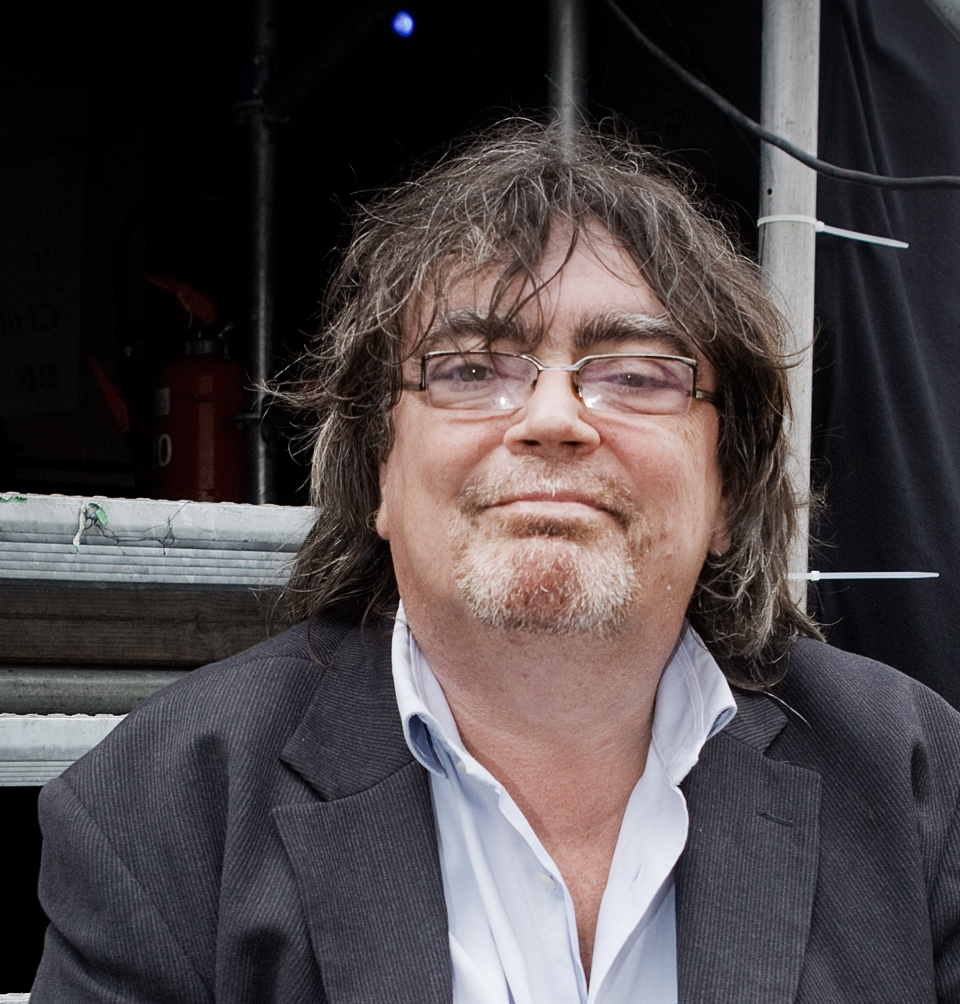

Member of Flemish Parliament
- In office 1999–2009

Personal details
- Born: 2 April 1956
- Died: 1 December 2013 (aged 57)
- Political party: sp.a

Dany Vandenbossche (2 April 1956 – 1 December 2013) was a Belgian politician. As a member of the sp.a, he served from 1999 to 2009 in the Flemish Parliament.

He left politics after his party offered him no electable position in the 2009 elections. In October 2013, he became president of the Louis Paul Boon Society and was also chairman of the Vermeylenfonds. He obtained a master's degree in law and criminology from the University of Ghent.

Vandenbossche, age 57, died on 1 December 2013 in Ghent.

== Political mandates ==
- 1990-1995: Vice-Chairman of the CPAS of Ghent
- 1995-2006: councilor in Ghent
- 1995-1996: Ships of Culture in Ghent
- 1995-1999: Belgian representative in the House of Representatives
- 2007: community senator in the Senate
- 1999-2009: Member of the Flemish Parliament

== See also ==
- List of members of the Senate of Belgium, 2003–07
- List of members of the Flemish Parliament, 2004–09
