= Olga Zrihen =

Belgian politician

Olga Zrihen Zaari
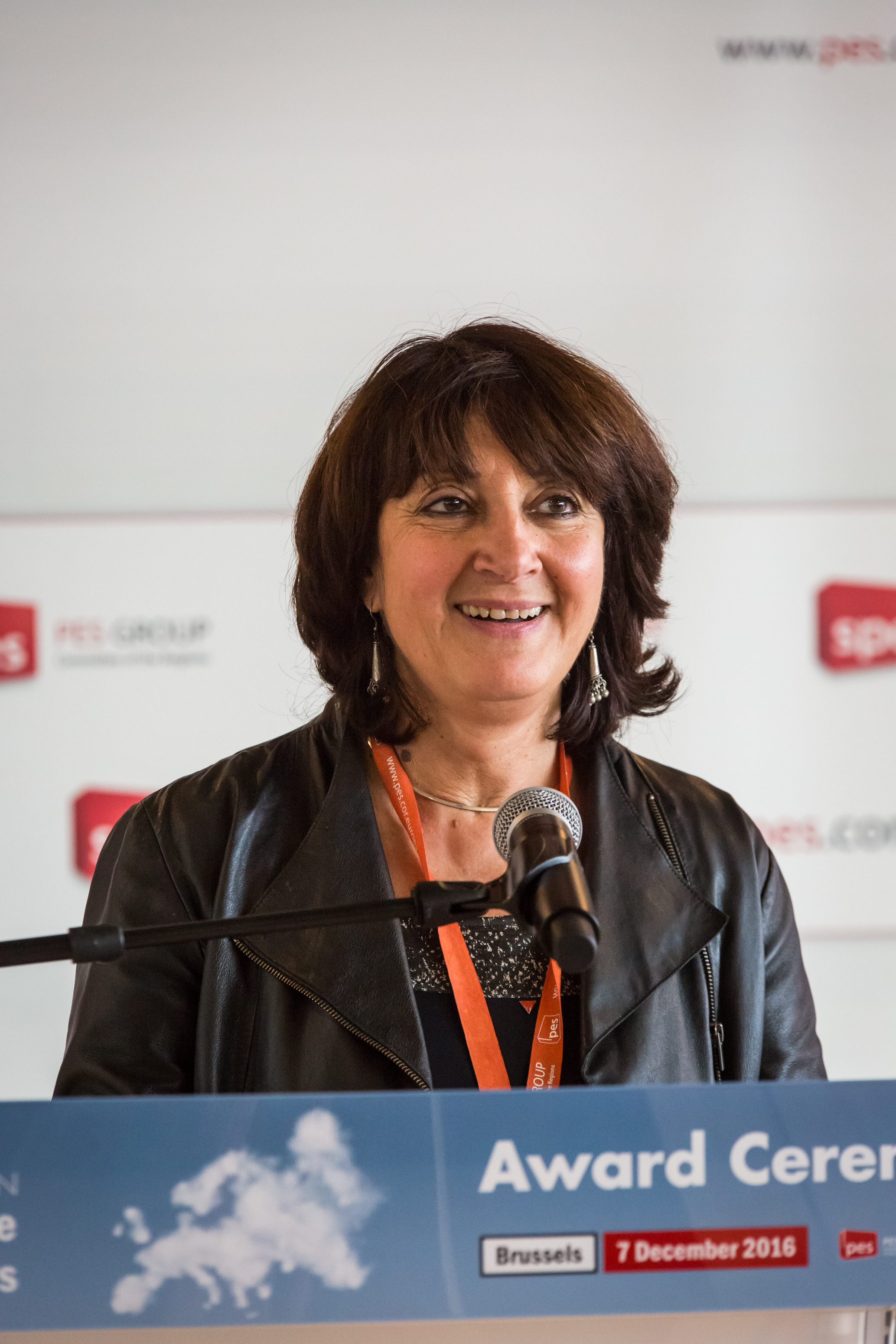

Senator
- In office 28 June 2007 – June 2011

Personal details
- Born: 10 January 1953 (age 73) Casablanca (Morocco)
- Party: Parti Socialiste

Olga Zrihen (Arabic: أولجا زريهان; Casablanca, January 10, 1953) is a Moroccan-born Belgian politician and a member of the Parti Socialiste.

== Biography ==
Zrihen was born to a Jewish family in Casablanca, Morocco. At the age of 6, her family moved to Lille, France. Due to this, she also has a French passport, and had a degree in Germanic languages from the University of Mons-Hainaut, today the University of Mons. Zrihen worked as a teacher of German and English between 1976 and 1991.

== Political career ==
Zrihen was elected to the municipal council of La Louvière, Belgium in the municipal elections in October 2000, by then as a French citizen. She was re-elected in 2006, and became deputy mayor in 2007.

She became a member of the European Parliament in April 2001, not reelected in June 2004, this time after having acquired Belgian citizenship. A few months later though, she was coopted to the Belgian Senate to replace Philippe Busquin, who was elected to the European Parliament, and in 2007, she was elected to it. She is a member of the International Council of Jewish Parliamentarians and in March 2002, she supported an appeal in favour of Israeli membership of the European Union.

Elected in 2009 as a member of the Regional Parliament of Wallonia, Zrihen replaced Joëlle Kapompolé as a senator for the Walloon community until 2014. She was also the vice-president of the Parti Socialiste between 2011 and 2014.

She has been awarded with the Order of Leopold twice, once in 2007 as a Chevalier, and in 2014 as an Officier.

=== Election results ===
- 2001: Municipal councillor of La Louvière
- 2001–2004: Member of the European Parliament
- 2004–2007: Senator, coopted
- 2007–2009: Senator, directly elected
- 2006–2009: Deputy mayor of La Louvière
- 2006–: Municipal Councillor of La Louvière
- Member of the Waloon Parliament since June 30, 2009
  - Senator for the French Community:
    - June 30, 2009 to May 7, 2010
    - July 7, 2010 to May 25, 2014 (replacing Joëlle Kapompolé)
    - Since June 23, 2014 (appointed by the Walloon parliament) Vice President of the Senate

== Honors received ==
- Knight of the Order of Leopold, 2007
- Officer of the Order of Leopold, 2014
