= Frank Swaelen =

Belgian politician (1930–2007)

President of the Senate
- In office 11 October 1988 – 14 June 1999
- Preceded by: Lambert Kelchtermans
- Succeeded by: Armand De Decker

Personal details
- Born: 23 March 1930 Antwerp, Belgium
- Died: 23 December 2007 (aged 77) Antwerp, Belgium
- Party: Christian Democratic and Flemish

Frank Swaelen (23 March 1930 – 23 December 2007) was a Belgian Christian Democratic politician and member of the Christian People's Party (CVP). He was born in Antwerp. In 1968, he became a member of the Chamber of Representatives. He became Minister of Defence in 1980 but one year later he became the national chairman of the CVP, which he remained until 1988, when he became the President of the Senate.

He became a Minister of State in 1995 and retired from active politics in 1999 after having presided over the Senate for more than 10 years.

He died on 23 December 2007 in Antwerp.

== Honours ==
Swaelen received the following honours:

- Grand cordon in the Order of Leopold
- Knight Grand Cross in the Order of the Crown
- Knight Grand Cross in the Order of Leopold II
- Knight Grand Cross in the Order of the Oak Crown
- Knight Grand Cross in the Order of Al Merito Bernardo O'Higgins
- Knight Grand Cross in the Order of Merit of the Federal Republic of Germany

== Political career ==
- 1964–1966: National chairman of the CVP Youth
- 1966–1976: General political secretary of the CVP
- 1968–1985: Member of the Chamber of Representatives
- 1971–1988: Mayor of Hove
- 1980–1981: Minister of Defence
- 1981–1988: National chairman of the CVP
- 1985–1999: Senator
- 1988–1999: President of the Senate

Political offices
Preceded by Lambert Kelchtermans	President of the Senate; 1988–1999	Succeeded by Armand De Decker
