= Mimount Bousakla =

Belgian politician of Moroccan origin

- Born: 24 May 1972 (age 53); Azlef, Rif, Morocco
- Occupation: politician

Mimount Bousakla (born 24 May 1972) is a Belgian politician of Moroccan origin. She started her career as member of the Flemish Socialist Party. On 18 May 2003, she was directly elected to the Belgian Senate by the Flemish electoral college. In 2004, she received the "Stichting Anti-Facisme (SAF) Prijs 2004" (Anti-Fascism Foundation Award 2004) "for her efforts and perseverance in the fight against fascism and racial discrimination".

On 13 May 2007, she left the social-democratic SP.a and joined List Dedecker, a new liberal party.

Bousakla also became a banker at Bpost after her political career. In 2013, she was diagnosed with breast cancer.
