= Corruption in Belgium =

Corruption in Belgium describes the prevention and occurrence of corruption in Belgium. In general, Belgium has a well-developed legal and institutional framework for fighting against corruption.

== Extent ==
On Transparency International's 2025 Corruption Perceptions Index, Belgium scored 69 on a scale from 0 ("highly corrupt") to 100 ("very clean"). When ranked by score, Belgium ranked 21st among the 182 countries in the Index, where the country ranked first is perceived to have the most honest public sector. For comparison with regional scores, the best score among Western European and European Union countries (Note: Austria, Belgium, Bulgaria, Croatia, Cyprus, Czechia, Denmark, Estonia, Finland, France, Germany, Greece, Hungary, Iceland, Ireland, Italy, Latvia, Lithuania, Luxembourg, Malta, Netherlands, Norway, Poland, Portugal, Romania, Slovakia, Slovenia, Spain, Sweden, Switzerland, and the United Kingdom.) was 89, the average score was 64 and the worst score was 40. For comparison with worldwide scores, the best score was 89 (ranked 1), the average score was 42, and the worst score was 9 (ranked 181, in a two-way tie).

Despite Belgium's respectable performance on the Corruption Perceptions Index, public trust in the civil service and judiciary is low, and the perception of corruption is extremely high in Belgium. Over 65% of people in Belgium think corruption is a problem. Over 70% think the government is at least to a large extent, or even entirely, run by a few big entities acting in their own best interests. There are areas that could be improved. For instance, whistleblower protection needs further improvement. It has been recommended that the process of anti-corruption policy implementation should also actively engage private sectors.

=== Dictator sanctuary accusations ===
Belgium offered a post-presidency retirement sanctuary for Rafael Correa, former president of Ecuador, who was investigated for massive corruption as soon as he left office. In January 2019, Ecuadorean president Lenin Moreno said that nearly half of $4.9 billion in oil infrastructure investment made during the administration of previous president Correa was stolen via corruption. Over 317 officials who served in Correa's administration were suspected of corruption. Correa was president of Ecuador between 2007 and 2017. He immediately moved to Belgium when his term was over.

=== Police corruption ===
Belgium's levels of corruption in police and business matters are considered to be low. A 2012 ranking specifically on police corruption rated Belgium 16th out of 176. The 2013 Special Eurobarometer stated that 67% percent of Belgium's population felt general corruption, not just police-related, was widespread, compared to the EU average of 76%.

Respondents to the Global Corruption Barometer in 2014 stated that, on a scale of 1-5 (5 being extremely corrupt), police corruption was at 3.2. 11% of respondents felt police corruption had increased since 2011, 51% felt it had decreased. 61% of respondents felt the government's response to police corruption was ineffective.

Two independent organizations deal with police corruption: the General Inspectorate of the Police (AIG) and the Committee P. There are also 196 internal control units within local police forces to deal with minor incidents and police misconduct in conjunction with the AIG and Committee P. In 2011, out of 1,045 investigations by the AIG, 6 were specifically corruption-based, with higher numbers of breaching professional confidence (44) or fraud (26), but lower (3) of abuse of police power. To maintain impartiality, the AIG has completely separate servers from the police, but draws on a number of databases for its investigations, as well as working together with the Committee P. The Committee P generally deals with the most important corruption cases, such as those relating to organized crime or torture. Belgium also has other institutions that deal with corruption, including police-related cases, on a wider scale: the Standing Police Monitoring Committee, and the Central Office for the Repression of Corruption (OCRC).

== See also ==
- Crime in Belgium
- List of political scandals in Belgium
