= Michel Delacroix (politician) =

Belgian politician

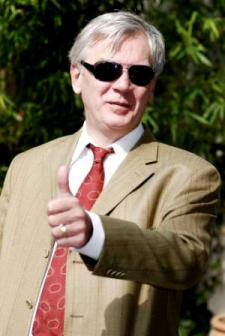
- In office 28 June 2007 – June 2011
- Website: www.micheldelacroix.be

Michel Delacroix (French pronunciation: [miʃɛl dəlakʁwa]) is a Belgian politician. He was elected to the Belgian Senate in 2007.

Being blind, he was from 1990 until 1995 the vice-president of the Braille League (fr:La Ligue Braille; nl:Brailleliga), a Belgian non-profit helping visually impaired people.
