= Jacqueline Mayence-Goossens =

Belgian politician (born 1932)

Senator in the Senate of Belgium
- In office 1978–1999

Personal details
- Born: 14 September 1932 (age 93) Aarschot, Belgium
- Party: Liberal Reformist Party

Jacqueline Mayence-Goossens (born 14 September 1932) is a former Belgian politician. She was a Senator in the Senate of Belgium from 1979 until 1999 and a member of the Liberal Reformist Party. She also served as a member of the Parliament of Wallonia and the Minister of Housing and Information Technology in the Government of Wallonia.

== Early life ==
Mayence-Goossens was born on 14 September 1932 in Aarschot. She received a degree in political and diplomatic sciences from the Université catholique de Louvain in 1955. She married the lawyer Philippe Mayence, who was a candidate for presidency of the Christian Social Party in the 1970s. The couple had three children. From 1970, she was a member of the Interuniversity Centre for Continuing Education.

She helped organise service for the 1958 Universal Exhibition. She served as an advisor for the Confederation of Family Organisations in the European Union (COFACE) while working as a chair for the organisation Connaissance et Vie d'Aujourd'hui.

== Political career ==
Mayence-Goossens was first elected in October 1979, as the district councillor for Charleroi, a position that she held until 1988 and then again from 1995 to 2000. She served as a representative of the Liberal Reformist Party (PRL). She was elected to the Senate of Belgium in the 1978 general election as a directly elected senator for the Charleroi-Thuin district, a position that she held until 1995. She was a member of the Senate commissions on foreign affairs, foreign trade, development co-operation and public health. She also served as the deputy campaigns officer for the Senate Environmental Commission. She was active in the Senate debate on the partial decriminalisation of abortion and signed the first bill proposed by Senators Lucienne Herman-Michielsens and Roger Lallemand. She proposed various amendments to legally define the concept of 'distress' in relation to abortion.

In 1980, the Special Act of 9 August 1980 was enacted which implemented Article 107 quarter of the Constitution of Belgium and created the first permanent regional assemblies in Belgium. When the Parliament of Wallonia was established and the 131 elected representatives met in Wépion on 15 October 1980 for the first time, she was one of only eight female members and the only woman elected from the PRL. She remained active in politics in the region, replacing André Bertouille as the Minister of Housing and Information Technology in the Government of Wallonia from 1983 to 1985. She was the first woman to hold a ministerial position in Wallonia. While a minister, she passed the legislation which governs the Société wallonne du logement, the local housing association for Wallonia, which was created as part of the constitutional change in August 1980.

When the new federal government led by Wilfried Martens and Jean Gol was elected, Mayence-Goossens was appointed as the Secretary of State for Development Cooperation, which was a department attached to the Ministry of Foreign Affairs, a position that she held from 1981 to 1983. She also served as a member of the Cultural Council of the French Cultural Community from 1978 to 1980 and as a member of the Council of the French Community from 1980 to 1985. She served as the vice president of the PRL from 1986 to 1990. She was re-elected to the Senate in the 1995 general election as the directly elected senator for the French-speaking electoral group.

== Honours and awards ==
She was honoured as a Grand Officer in the Order of Leopold in May 1995. She also received a Grand Cross of the Order of the Sun of Peru on 11 April 1983 and a Grand Cross of the Order of the Half Moon in Comoros.
