= Old Catholic Church of Belgium =

The Old Catholic Church of Belgium (French: Eglise Vieille-Catholique Indépendante de Belgique; Walloon: Eglijhe Vî-Catolike Indepindante di Beldjike) is an Old Catholic Church based in Belgium. The denomination is independent and is not tied to the Union of Utrecht.

It has a parish in Brussels, as well as in Saint-Servais, Namur where it conducts Mass in French, Walloon and Spanish. It is in communion with the Anglican Free Communion International (so that members of both communions are permitted to receive the sacraments in one another's churches). Like other Old Catholic churches, it allows the ordination of women and same-sex marriages.
