= Ingrid van Kessel =

Belgian politician

Ingrid van Kessel, born 11 November 1959 in Turnhout is a Belgian Flemish politician, representing CD&V.

She has a degree in Germanic philology (KUL) and was an educational collaborator.

== Career ==
- 1995-1999 : Member of the Chamber of Representatives
- 1999-2004 : Member of the Flemish Council
  - 1999-2003 : Community Senator appointed by the Flemish Council

== Honours ==
- Knight of the ordre de Léopold (2003)
