= Philippe Bodson =

Belgian businessman (1944–2020)

- Born: 2 November 1944
- Died: 4 April 2020 (aged 75)
- Education: Civil engineer Master of Business Administration
- Alma mater: University of Liège; INSEAD (Fontainebleau, France)
- Occupation: Businessman

Baron Philippe André Eugène Bodson (2 November 1944 – 4 April 2020) was a Belgian businessman and politician. He served in the Belgian Senate from 1999 to 2003.

== Education ==
Bodson graduated as civil engineer at the University of Liège (ULg) and obtained a Master of Business Administration at INSEAD (Fontainebleau, France)

== Career ==
Bodson started his career at McKinsey in Paris where he worked for three years. He then worked for four years for the Daus Bank in Germany and the United States. In 1977, he started working for Glaverbel, where he would be the CEO from 1980 until 1989. From September 1989 until December 1998, he was a non-executive member of the board of directors of Fortis. From 1999 until 2003, he was a senator in the Belgian Senate for the Mouvement reformateur. From 2004 until 2010, he was a Director at Fortis. In 2001, he was chief executive officer of Lernout & Hauspie Speech Product.

In addition he was also a member of several other companies, such as: Exmar where he was President of the Board, he was a board member at Ashmore Energy (USA), CIB, President of Floridienne, member of the advice committee of CSFB Europa, Hermes Asset Management Europe Ltd., and of Cobepa/Cobehold. He recently also served as the President of the BeCapital board, a cleantech private equity founded by Cobepa, Compagnie Financière Benjamin de Rothschild and BeCitizen. In the past he was a member of the think tank Coudenberg group.

== Death ==
Bodson died on 4 April 2020 from COVID-19.
