= Magdeleine Willame-Boonen =

Belgian politician (1940–2021)

Magdeleine Willame-Boonen (1940 – 17 May 2021) was a Belgian politician who served as a senator.
