= Roeland Raes =

Belgian politician (1934–2024)

- Born: Roland Henri Theofiel Raes; 4 September 1934; Ghent, Belgium
- Died: 28 November 2024 (aged 90); Aalter, Belgium
- Occupation: Politician

Roland Henri Theofiel Raes (4 September 1934 – 28 November 2024), better known as Roeland Raes, was a Belgian politician, a senator for and vice president of the political party Vlaams Blok. Raes took a dr. iur. (J.D.) at Ghent University.

Raes became politically active in 1955, when he became a member of the Volksunie. He was senator for Vlaams Blok from 1995 until 2002. He was Vlaams Belang chapter leader of Lovendegem, member of the Vlaams Belang party board of the district Gent-Eeklo and (as a former senator) member of the national party council of the Vlaams Belang. He worked at the party headquarters in Brussels as an archivarian.

In September 2024, the party sparked controversy by putting Raes, as one of its candidates in the upcoming municipal elections before removing his candidacy the following day.

Raes was convicted of spreading the antisemitic conspiracy theory of Holocaust denial.

Raes was a prominent member of Voorpost. He was a pagan and wrote for pagan publications such as the magazine TeKoS and Guy de Martelaere's newsletter Gwenved.

== Holocaust denial trial ==
Roeland Raes stepped down as senator and party vice president after accusations of Nazi sympathies. He was charged with Holocaust denial in accordance with the Belgian Holocaust denial law after saying on Dutch television: "I doubt the systematism of the extermination of the Jews and I also doubt the number of deaths, [...] and also whether camps such as Auschwitz were all meant to be extermination camps". During the interview, Raes however had no doubts about the systematic persecution and deportation of Jews by the Nazis.

The original complaint goes back to 2001. Meanwhile, the mother video tape with the full interview, which could have shed light on the context, got lost, so the evidence that can be used in the trial is limited to the parts of the interview that have been broadcast.

Early 2006, at the Public Prosecutor's request and after a hearing in chambers, the charges were dropped, but after an appeal by the Forum of Jewish Organisations, the case was resumed. In December 2008, he was given a suspended sentence of four months imprisonment. The Forum of Jewish Organisations and the Centre for Equal Opportunities and Opposition to Racism received €1,000 damages.

The Brussels court of appeal on 15 September 2010 confirmed Raes was guilty of negationism, and awarded €1,800 damages to each organisation. He did not receive a sentence, because the court decided the case had taken unreasonably long.

== Death ==
On 28 November 2024, Raes died in Aalter by euthanasia after a long illness, at the age of 90.
