= Joëlle Kapompolé =

Belgian politician

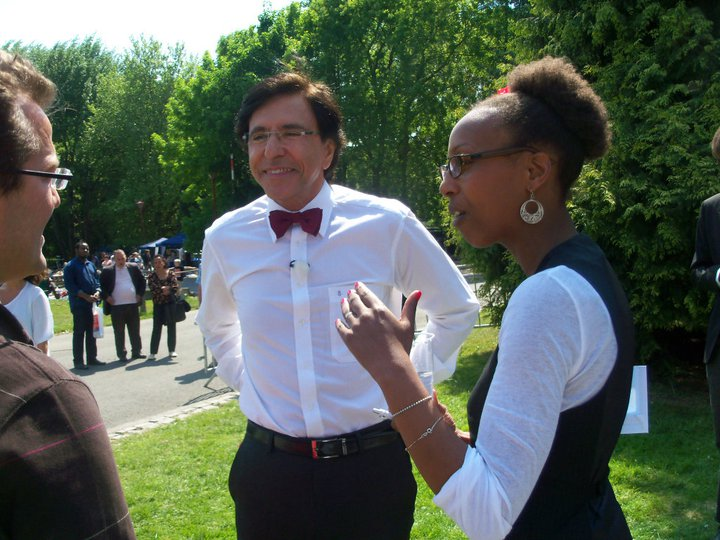
- Joëlle Kapompolé and Elio Di Rupo

Senator
- In office 2004 – June 2009

Personal details
- Born: 23 December 1971 (age 54) Kolwezi, Zaire
- Party: PS
- Children: 1
- Website: www.joellekapompole.be

Joëlle Kapompolé (born 23 December 1971 in Kolwezi, Zaire) is a Belgian politician and a member of the PS. She was a member of the Belgian Senate from 2004 to 2009.
