= Jacques Germeaux =

Belgian politician

- Born: 11 May 1956 (age 69); Genk, Belgium
- Occupation: politician

Jacques Germeaux (born 11 May 1956) is a doctor and a Belgian politician of the Flemish Liberals and Democrats (VLD).

He studied medicine at the Vrije Universiteit Brussel (Free University of Brussels).

Since 1995 he is a member of the local council in the city of Genk. He became a member of the Belgian Chamber of Representatives on 10 October 2001. After the national elections of 2003, he was appointed as Senator.
