= Jean-François Istasse =

Belgian politician (1950–2021)

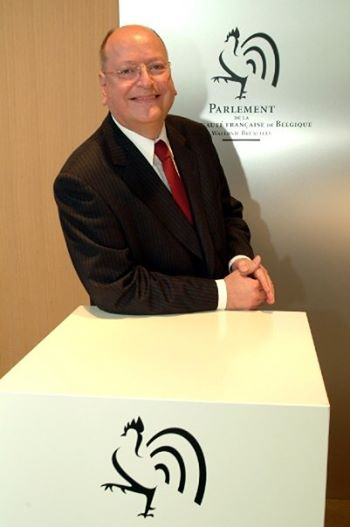
Jean-François Istasse

Jean-François Istasse (27 November 1950 – 25 July 2021) was a Belgian politician who served as a Deputy.

He studied at the Royal Athénée of Verviers (Humanities), at the Royal Athens of Etterbeek (5th and 6th primary) and Stanleyville (ex-Belgian Congo for goalkeepers and primary). Graduated (law degree) from the University of Liège in 1973, and master in public management from the Solvay Brussels School of Economics and Management in 1991.
