= Louis Tobback =

Belgian politician (born 1938)

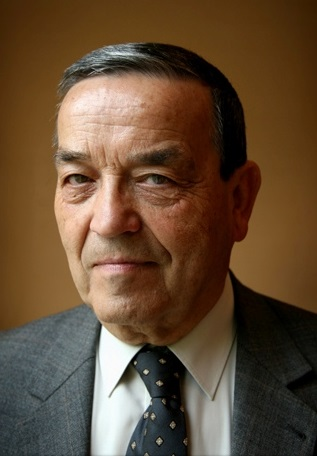

Mayor of Leuven
- In office 1 January 1995 – 31 December 2018
- Preceded by: Alfred Vansina
- Succeeded by: Mohamed Ridouani

Minister of the Interior and Civil Services
- In office 1992–1994

Member of Parliament (Senate)
- In office 1991–1995

Member of Parliament (Chamber of Representatives)
- In office 1974–1991

Personal details
- Born: 3 May 1938 (age 88) Leuven, Belgium
- Party: Socialistische Partij Anders
- Education: Free University of Brussels (VUB)
- Occupation: Politician

Louis Marie Joseph Tobback (born 3 May 1938) is a Belgian politician. Tobback is a Flemish social democrat and member of the political party SP.A. He was the mayor of Leuven (1995–2018) He graduated in Romance philology at the Vrije Universiteit Brussel. He is the father of Bruno Tobback, the former president of the Flemish socialist party Different Socialist Party (SP.A).

== Political career ==
Tobback started his political career in 1965 in the OCMW/CPAS council. In 1971 he was elected a member of the city council of Leuven, and became eerste schepen (first alderman).

In 1974, he became the leader of the Belgian Socialist Party faction in the Belgian Chamber of Representatives, and became a controversial but respected politician. Tobback is known for his oneliners in which he clearly states his opinion.

From 1988 until 1994, Tobback was Belgium's Minister of the Interior in two coalitions formed by Christian Democrats and Socialists, who faced the tough task of bringing Belgium into compliance with the Maastricht Treaty. It was known that he liked cooperating with Jean-Luc Dehaene, who was Prime Minister from 1992 until 1999.

In 1994 he became president of the Flemish social-democratic party (SP, since 2001 known as Socialistische Partij Anders, SP.A). At that time, the party faced difficulties due to the Agusta scandal in which several Flemish and Francophone Socialists were accused of corruption. Despite this, the party did not lose too many votes in the federal and regional elections in 1995. As president of the SP, he also started a campaign of ideological and organisational innovation within the party.

In 1995, Tobback also became the mayor of Leuven, and he was granted the title of Minister of State in recognition of his work in politics. He was re-elected as mayor in 2000, 2006 and 2012 and retired on 31 December 2018.

In April 1998, he again became Minister of the Interior, after Johan Vande Lanotte (also SP.A) resigned because of the escape of Marc Dutroux during his transport from jail to the court hall. In September 1998, Tobback himself resigned after a Nigerian candidate for immigration (Semira Adamu) died during her forced repatriation.

Tobback is a self-declared Orangist. He considers the break-up of the Netherlands and Belgium a historic mistake. "If the United Kingdom of the Netherlands would have endured, we would have been a member of the G8 today", Tobback said in 2006.

== Honours ==
- 1995: Grand Officer in the Order of Leopold.
- 2003: Knight Grand Cross in the Order of Leopold II.

== Gallery ==
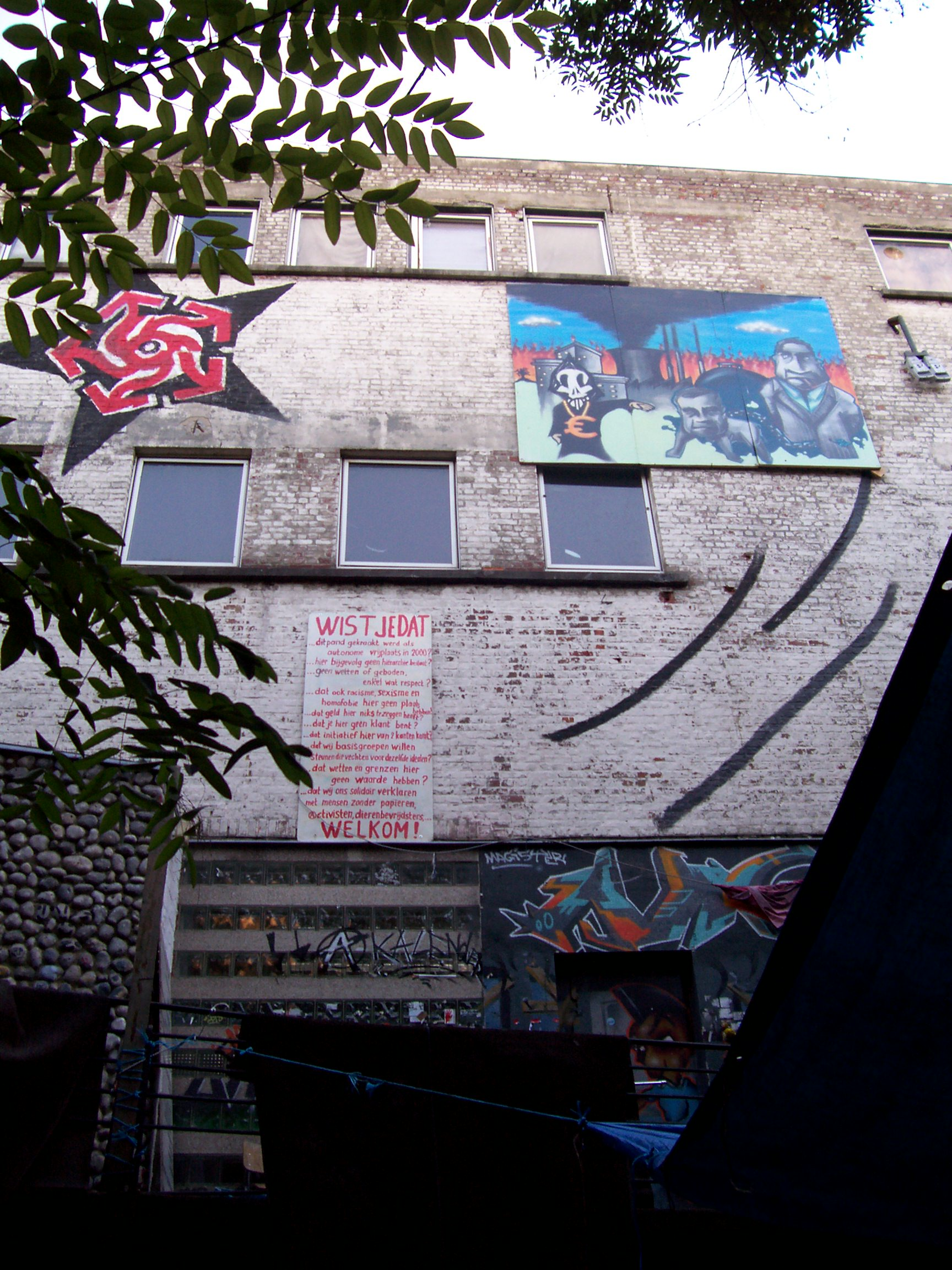
The face of the squat 'Villa Squattus Dei' in Leuven (Belgium). Also depicted: caricature of Louis Tobback.

== Sources ==
- Louis Tobback (in Dutch)
- Louis Tobback (Elections 2006)
