= François Roelants du Vivier =

Belgian politician (born 1947)

Senator
- In office 2000 – June 2009

Member of the European Parliament
- In office 1984–1989

Personal details
- Born: 5 November 1947 (age 78) Etterbeek
- Party: Francophone Democratic Federalists (FDF)
- Other political affiliations: Ecolo
- Website: www.roelantsduvivier.be

François Marie Gabriel André Charles-Ferdinand Roelants du Vivier (born 5 November 1947) is a Belgian politician and a member of Ecolo and later the FDF (Francophone Democratic Federalists).

He is part of the political family Nothomb; his grandfather is Pierre Nothomb and his ancestors include Jean-Baptiste Nothomb, who helped draft the Belgian Constitution and served as Prime Minister.

Roelants du Vivier started his career in Ecolo, and was a Member of the European Parliament elected in 1984 and serving until 1989.

In 1988 he started the Europe-Régions-Environnement (ERE) movement after leaving Ecolo. In 1993, he announced that he would found a new party, a Belgian equivalent of the French Génération Écologie and the German Realos inside the German Greens. Under the electoral alliance FDF-ERE, he was elected to the Brussels Parliament in the 1989 elections. He was re-elected 1995, 1999 and 2004. From 2000 until 2009 he also served in the Parliament of the French Community and the Senate as community senator.

From 1994 until 2000 he was also municipal councillor in Uccle.
