= Pierre Chevalier (politician) =

Belgian politician (born 1952)

- Born: Pierre Antoine Marie Chevalier; 8 October 1952 (age 73); Bruges, Belgium
- Occupation: politician

Pierre Antoine Marie Chevalier (born 8 October 1952) is a Belgian politician and member of the Open Vlaamse Liberalen en Democraten (VLD). He is a former Secretary of State in the Belgian Federal Government and was elected to the Belgian Senate in 2003 by the Dutch electoral college. He studied Laws and Criminology at the University of Ghent before he became a lawyer. He became involved in politics early on, first as a Trotskyist, as a socialist later on, and since 1992 as a liberal. In October 2000, he was forced to resign as Secretary of State by Prime Minister Guy Verhofstadt, who is also a member of the VLD, after it became public that he had been named in a criminal investigation in Switzerland.

== Political career ==
- 1985–2003: Member of the Chamber of Representatives
- 1988–1989: Secretary of State for Education
- 1989–1990: Secretary of State for Science Policy
- 1990–1992: Member of the Parliamentary Assembly of the Council of Europe and the Assembly of the Western European Union
- 1999–2000: Secretary of State for Foreign Trade
- Since 2003: Directly elected Senator for the Dutch electoral college
- Pierre Chevalier is a special envoy for the Organization for Security and Co-operation in Europe
