= Patrik Vankrunkelsven =

Senator
- In office 28 June 2007 – June 2011

Personal details
- Born: 2 May 1957 (age 69) Geel
- Party: VU (1983–1998); VU-iD21 (1998–2001); Spirit (2001–2002); VLD (2002–2007); Open VLD (2007–)
- Education: Katholieke Universiteit Leuven
- Occupation: politician, physician, professor
- Website: www.vankrunkelsven.be

Patrick Jules Maria Vankrunkelsven (born 2 May 1957), is a Belgian physician, professor of medicine and politician. He obtained an MD and PhD from the Katholieke Universiteit Leuven (Leuven, Belgium). He currently serves as the director of the Belgian Centre for Evidence-Based Medicine (CEBAM).

== Political career ==
He was president of the Volksunie from 1998 until 2000, succeeding Bert Anciaux. When that party was dissolved in 2001, he initially chose the left-liberal SPIRIT, but eventually went to the VLD where he was senator from 2007 until 2011. He was part of the party's left wing. Patrik Vankrunkelsven has been mayor of Laakdal from 1994 to 2006.

At the end of 2009, he announced that he would leave politics to refocus on his medical practice and his professional status at the university.
