= Philippe Monfils =

Belgian politician (born 1939)

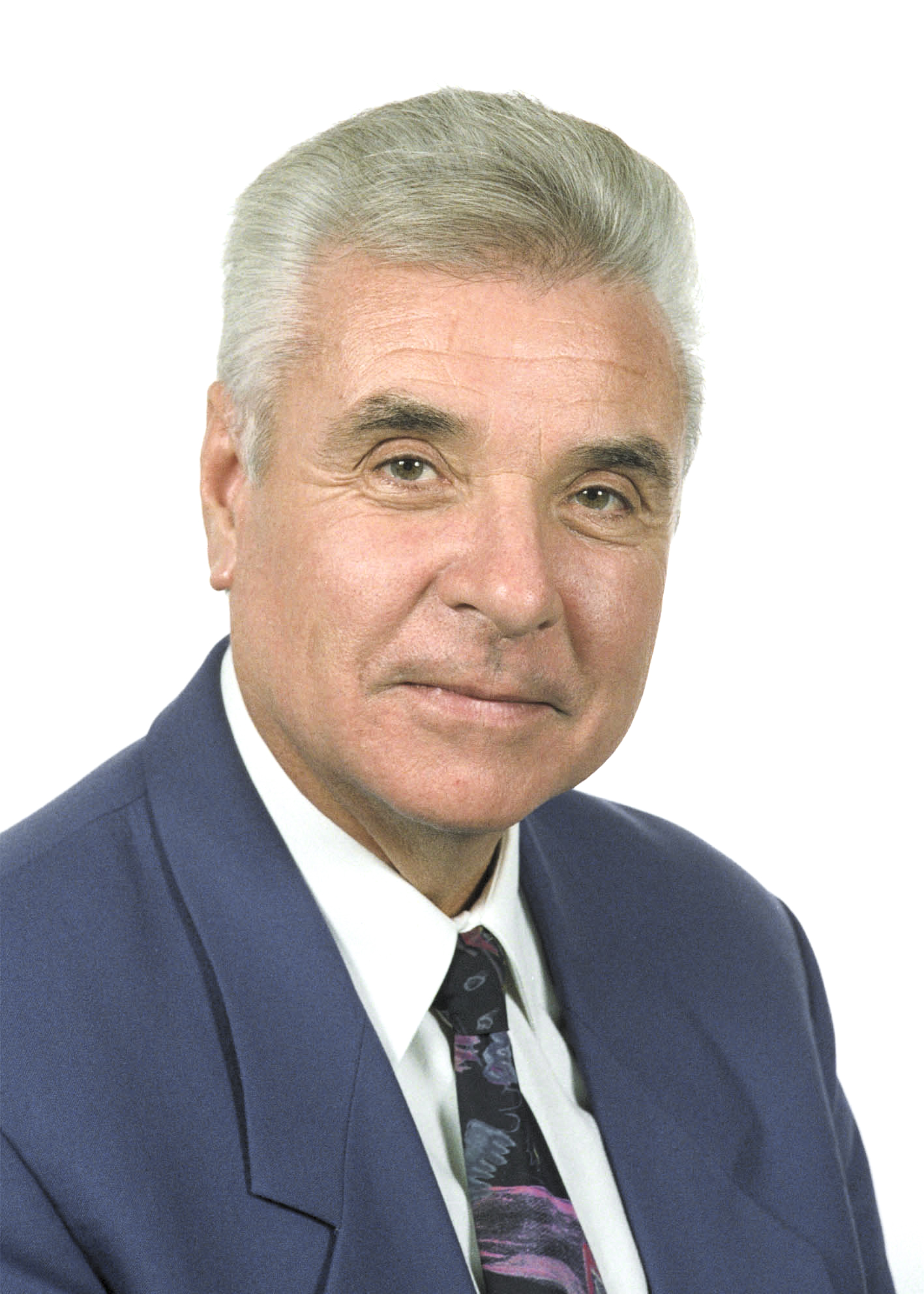

Minister-President of the French Community
- In office 9 December 1985 – 12 February 1988
- Preceded by: Philippe Moureaux
- Succeeded by: Philippe Moureaux

Personal details
- Born: 4 January 1939 (age 86) Liège
- Political party: Reformist Movement

Philippe Monfils (born 1939) is a Belgian politician and a member of the MR. He was elected as a member of the Belgian Senate in 2007.

== Honours ==
- 1999 : Grand Officer in the Order of Leopold.
- 2007 : Knight Grand Cross in the Order of Leopold II.

== Notes ==
Political offices
Preceded by Philippe Moureaux	Minister-President of the French Community; 1985–1988	Succeeded by Philippe Moureaux
