= Armand De Decker =

Belgian politician (1948–2019)

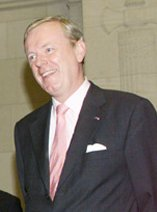
- De Decker in 2001

President of the Senate
- In office 12 July 2007 – 20 July 2010
- Preceded by: Anne-Marie Lizin
- Succeeded by: Danny Pieters
- In office 14 July 1999 – 20 July 2004
- Preceded by: Frank Swaelen
- Succeeded by: Anne-Marie Lizin

Personal details
- Born: 8 October 1948 Brussels, Belgium
- Died: 12 June 2019 (aged 70) Woluwe-Saint-Lambert, Belgium
- Party: Reformist Movement
- Education: Université libre de Bruxelles
- Website: Official website

Armand De Decker (8 October 1948 – 12 June 2019) was a Belgian politician and member of the French-speaking liberal party Mouvement Réformateur (MR).

De Decker studied law at the Université libre de Bruxelles and practised law. He was also mayor of Uccle between 2006 and 2017. He died on 12 June 2019.

== Political career ==
- In 1981 he was elected for the Parti Réformateur Libéral to the Belgian Chamber of Representatives where he served until 1995.
- In 1995 he was elected to the Belgian Senate, and re-elected in 1999, 2003, 2007 and 2010.
  - From 1999 to 2003, and from 2007 to 2010, he was President of the Senate.
  - Beginning in 2010, he was second vice-president of the senate.
- He served as president of the council of the Brussels-Capital Region from 1995 to 1999.
- From 20 July 2004 to 12 July 2007, De Decker served as the minister responsible for Development Cooperation in the Belgian Federal Government.
- Until 17 June 2017 he was mayor of Uccle.

== Honours ==
=== National honours ===
- Grand Cross of the Order of Crown (6 June 2010)
- Grand Cross of the Order of Leopold II (11 May 2003)
- Grand Officer of the Order of Leopold (9 June 1999)

=== Foreign honours ===
- Colombia : Grand Officer of the Order of San Carlos (4 February 1997)
- Denmark : Grand Cross of the Order of the Dannebrog (28 February 2002) °
- Finland : Commander Grand Cross of the Order of the White Rose (30 March 2004) °
- France : Knight of the Order of the Legion of Honour (9 July 1997)
- Greece : Grand Officer of the Order of the Phoenix (1er January 1994)
- Italy : Knight Grand Cross of the Order of Merit of the Italian Republic (15 October 2002) °
- Malta : Grand Cross of the National Order of Merit
- Mexico : Grand Cross of the Order of the Aztec Eagle (10 December 2002) °
- Norway : Grand Cross of the Royal Norwegian Order of Merit (20 May 2003) °
- Netherlands : Grand Cross of the Order of Orange-Nassau
- Peru : Grand Cross of the Order of the Sun (2006) *
- Spain : Grand Cross of the Order of Isabella the Catholic (12 May 2000) °
- Sweden : Commander Grand Cross of the Royal Order of the Polar Star (8 May 2001) °

== Notes ==
Political offices
Preceded by Frank Swaelen	President of the Senate; 1999–2004	Succeeded by Anne-Marie Lizin
Preceded by Anne-Marie Lizin	President of the Senate; 2007–2010	Succeeded by Danny Pieters
