= Paul Wille =

Belgian politician

Senator
- In office 5 July 2007 – 13 June 2010

Personal details
- Party: Open VLD
- Website: www.paulwille.be

Paul Wille was a Belgian senator and is a member of the Open Flemish Liberals and Democrats. He was elected as a member of the Belgian Senate in 2007.
