= Marie-José Laloy =

Belgian politician

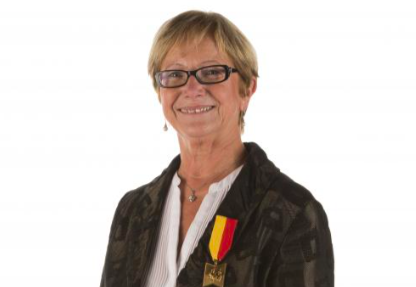
Image of Marie-José Laloy

Marie-José Laloy (born 17 June 1950) is a Belgian politician of the Parti Socialiste.

Laloy was born in Rulles, Habay. She was a member of the Senate from 1999 to 2007, and governor of Walloon Brabant from 2007 to 2014.
