= Marcel Cheron =

Belgian politician (born 1957)

Senator
- In office 1999 – June 2011

Personal details
- Born: 10 August 1957 (age 69) Ittre
- Party: Ecolo
- Education: Université catholique de Louvain

Marcel Cheron (born 10 August 1957 in Ittre) is a Belgian politician and a member of Ecolo. He has an MA in History from the Université catholique de Louvain. He was elected to the Walloon Parliament in 1991 and became automatically a member of the Parliament of the French Community at the same time. He was a member of the Belgian Senate from 1999 until 2005. He was re-elected as a member of the Belgian Senate in 2007.

Since 11 May 2003, he is an Officer in the Order of Leopold.
