= Frank Creyelman =

Belgian politician

City councillor in Mechelen
- Incumbent
- Assumed office 1994

Member of the Belgian Senate
- In office 1999–2007

Member of the Flemish Parliament
- In office 1995–1999
- Constituency: Mechelen-Turnhout
- In office 2007–2014
- Constituency: Antwerp Province

Personal details
- Born: Frank Beno Mariano Creyelman; August 10, 1961 (age 64) Dendermonde, Belgium
- Party: Independent (2023-)
- Other political affiliations: Vlaams Belang (2004-2023); Vlaams Blok (1978-2004)
- Relatives: Steven Creyelman (brother)

Frank Beno Mariano Creyelman (born 10 August 1961) is a Belgian politician. Between 1995 and 1999 he served as a member of the Flemish Parliament; between 1999 and 2007 as a member of the senate and between 2007 and 2014 again as member of the Flemish Parliament. He is the brother of fellow Vlaams Belang politician Steven Creyelman. He was expelled from Vlaams Belang in 2023 after an investigation uncovered spying links to China.

== Biography ==
Creyelman studied degrees in humanities and modern languages in Mechelen before working in the gaming industry for a number of years.

He first got involved in politics as a member of the Order of Flemish Militants (VMO) in 1979 and later became a member of the Vlaams Blok and served as vice-chairman of the party in Mechelen from 1989 to 1991. He was also a municipal councilor in Mechelen for the party. During the first direct elections to the Flemish Parliament in the 1995 Belgian regional elections, he was elected for the Mechelen-Turnhout electoral constituency and was coopted as a Senator in 1999. He was subsequently reelected when the constituency became the Antwerp district and served chairman of the Commission for Foreign Policy, European Affairs and International Cooperation in the Flemish Parliament.

During his time in politics, Creyelman became known for his sympathies for the Russian government and visited Moscow to meet with representatives of Putin. As faction leader of the Vlaams Belang in Mechelen, he was also against arms supply from Belgium to Ukraine during the Russian invasion of Ukraine in early 2022. His statements were met with indignation. Some his of his pro-Russian statements were criticised by Vlaams Belang leader Tom Van Grieken who distanced the party from them.

== Chinese spying scandal ==
On 15 December 2023, a joint investigation by Financial Times, Der Spiegel and Le Monde revealed that Creyelman accepted bribes from China's Ministry of State Security for three years to influence discussions within the European Union. Subsequently, Vlaams Belang expelled him from the party. Creyelman was investigated by police but he could not be prosecuted due to loopholes in Belgium's penal code. His brother Steven Creyelman was also interviewed by Belgian security services after a series of texts were uncovered in which Frank Creyelman had messaged him assignment requests due to his brother's role as chairman of the Committee for Army Procurement, but no sufficient evidence was found of Steven Creyelman having direct links to China. As a result, Steven Creyelman distanced himself from his brother's scandals but announced he would withdraw himself as a candidate for Vlaams Belang at the next election.
