= Jacques Timmermans =

Belgian politician (1945–2021)

Member of the Parliamentary Assembly of the Council of Europe
- In office 8 November 2001 – 23 November 2004

Member of the Flemish Council
- In office 1988–2004

Member of the Senate of Belgium
- In office 1991–1995

Member of the Chamber of Representatives of Belgium
- In office 1987–1991

Personal details
- Born: 13 October 1945 Ninove, Belgium
- Died: 16 December 2021 (aged 76) Aalst, Belgium
- Party: SP

Jacques Timmermans (13 October 1945 – 16 December 2021) was a Belgian politician.

He was a member of the Socialist Party and served in the Parliamentary Assembly of the Council of Europe, the Flemish Council, the Senate, and the Chamber of Representatives. Timmermans died on 16 December 2021, at the age of 76.

== Awards ==
- Officer of the Order of Leopold (2003)
