= Josy Dubié =

Belgian politician

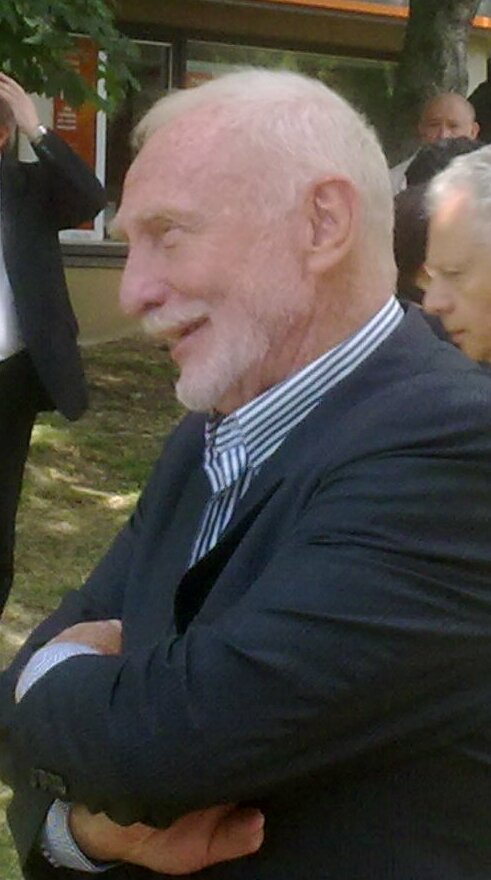

Senator
- In office 1999 – June 2009

Personal details
- Party: Ecolo

Josy Dubié is a Belgian reporter, politician and a member of Ecolo. He was a member of the Belgian Senate from 1999 to 2003, and from 2005 to 2009.
