= Anne-Marie Lizin =

Belgian politician (1949–2015)

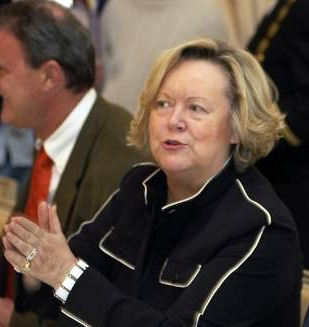
- Lizin in 2005

United Nations Independent Expert on extreme poverty and human rights
- In office 1998–2004
- Preceded by: Position established
- Succeeded by: Arjun Kumar Sengupta

President of the Senate
- In office 20 July 2004 – 12 July 2007
- Preceded by: Armand De Decker
- Succeeded by: Armand De Decker

Personal details
- Born: Anne-Marie Vanderspeeten; 5 January 1949 Huy, Belgium
- Died: 17 October 2015 (aged 66) Huy, Belgium
- Party: Socialist Party
- Spouse: Michel Lizin (m. 1971)
- Education: University of Liège
- Website: Official website

Anne-Marie Lizin-Vanderspeeten (5 January 1949 – 17 October 2015) was a Belgian politician, who served as the President of the Senate of Belgium from 2004 to 2007.

== Political career ==
Her career in politics began as a member of the city council of Ben-Ahin from 1970 to 1976. She served on the city council of Huy in 1977 and was an alderman for Huy from 1980 to 1982. In 1983, she was appointed mayor of Huy, holding this position for 26 years. In March 2009 she was forced to resign because of a series of scandals. She was succeeded by Micheline Toussaint.

In 1979, Lizin was elected as an elected Member of the European Parliament. In 1988, she was elected into the Belgian government, and served in office for eight years. During her first term, she was appointed as Secretary of State for European Affairs, yet she decided to leave this role in 1992 to initiate the Commission of Inquiry on human trafficking. In 2003, she became President of the Commission for External Relations and Defence of the Belgian Senate; In 2004, she was appointed President of the Senate of Belgium, before finally becoming Senator in July 2007. She was the first female President of the Belgian Senate (2004–07). On 27 January 2009 she was banned from the Socialist party after a corruption case. Outside of her career in Belgian politics, Lizin was the United Nations Independent Expert on Human Rights and Extreme Poverty from 1998 to 2004.

== Court trial ==
In March 2015 she was convicted in appeals court in Liège for electoral malpractice. She had appealed the conviction to the Supreme Court.

== Philanthropy ==
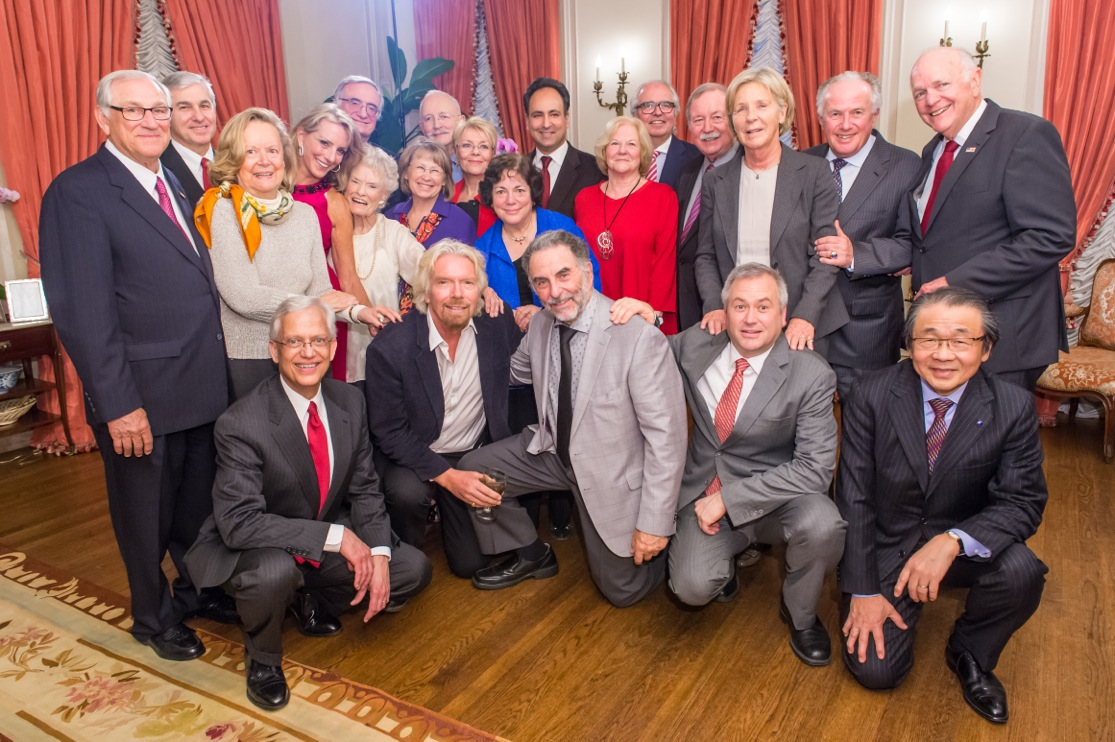
Anne-Marie Lizin (top row, third from left) with the Board of Directors of the International Centre for Missing & Exploited Children

Lizin was a member of the Board of Directors of the International Centre for Missing & Exploited Children (ICMEC), a global nonprofit organization that combats child sexual exploitation, child pornography, and child abduction.

In 2008, she created the organisation HOCRINT, an international co-ordination network that fight against honor crimes and forced marriages. She played an active role for the End Human Trafficking Now (EHTN) organisation, in which she sat on the board till her death.

== Publications ==
During her time in politics, Lizin released many publications, her most famous include, Women of Europe and the Third World, what solidarity? (1983) Social Democracy Tomorrow (1990) and Kosovo Independence Inevitable (1997).

== Political interests ==
Lizin was widely acclaimed for her devotion to tackling human rights issues. Of particular importance to her were the rights of women across the globe and the need to eradicate human trafficking.

== Death ==
Lizin was hospitalized in Paris on 7 October 2015. A few days after being released from hospital in Paris, she died in Hotel Fort at Huy in Belgium on 17 October 2015 at the age of 66.

== Honours ==
- 2003: Commander in the Order of Leopold.
- 2007: Knight Grand cross in the Order of Leopold II.
- Poland: 1st class - Grand Cross of the Order of Merit of the Republic of Poland.

Political offices
Preceded by Armand De Decker	President of the Senate; 2004–2007	Succeeded by Armand De Decker
