= Alain Zenner =

Belgian politician (born 1946)

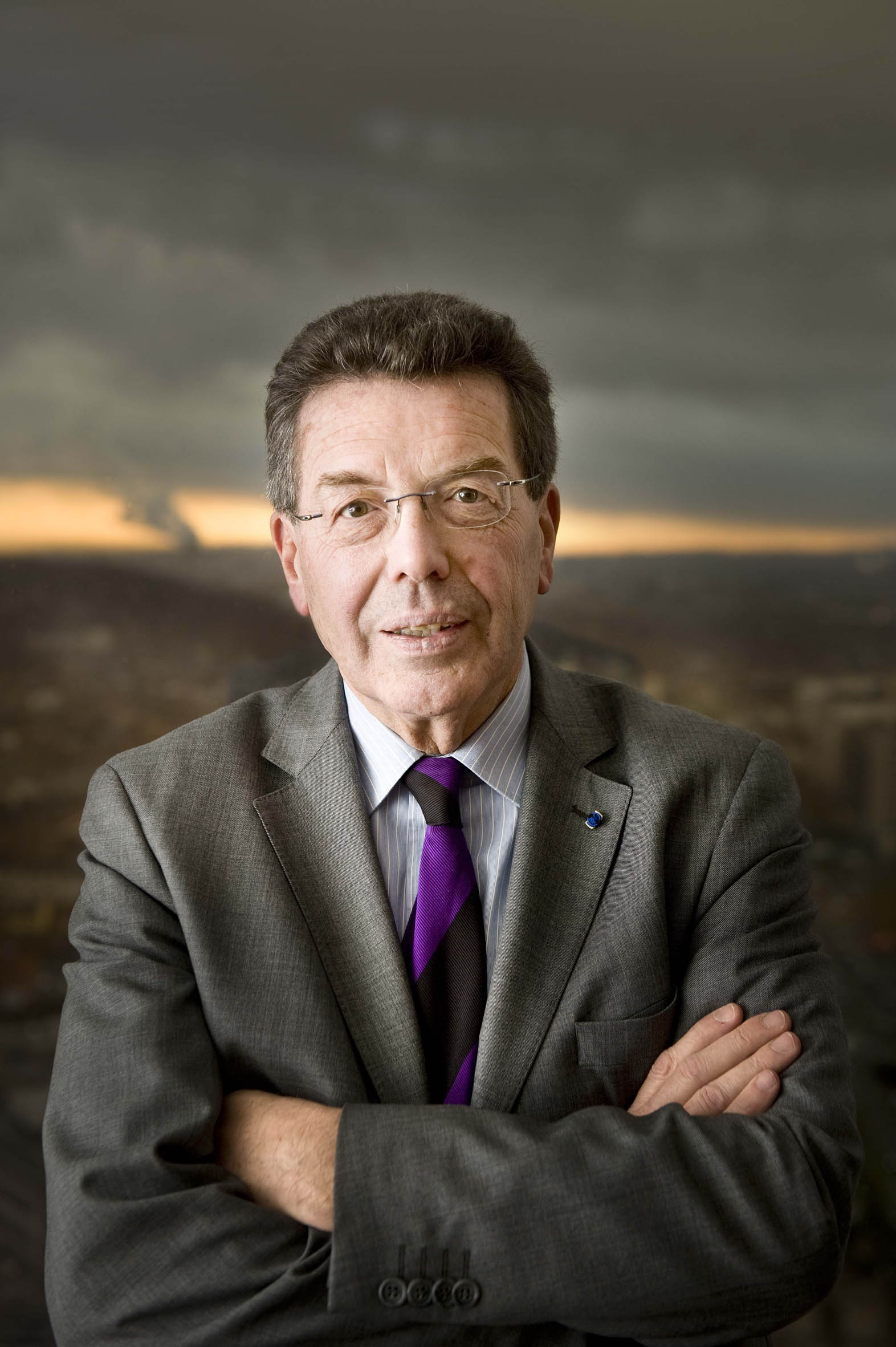

Senator

Personal details
- Party: MR

Alain Zenner (born 20 February 1946 in Ghent) is a Belgian politician. He served as Senator from 1999 to 2007, Government commissioner for the Minister of Finance from 1999 to 2003 and State Secretary for the Minister of Energy for a brief period in 2003.

== Biography ==
He was born in Ghent and graduated with a doctor of Laws at age of 22 years from the University of Ghent. He completed his studies with a Master of Comparative Law at the University of Chicago Law School in 1969. He practices as a lawyer in Brussels and conduct a career assistant to the Law Faculty of the Free University of Brussels. Since 1991, he was elected to the Parliament of the Brussels-Capital Region on behalf of the Liberal Reform Party and then the Reform Movement.

When the Forges de Clabecq (a steel mill located 20 km from Brussels) was declared bankrupt by the Commercial Court of Nivelles in 1996, Zenner was designated as liquidator for the company. The closure was symbolic for the decline of Walloon industry. Opposing him was Roberto D'Orazio, a worker of Italian origin, son of immigrant worker and leader of the delegation of the Socialist labor union FGTB, supported by the Workers' Party of Belgium.

In late November 2009, Alain Zenner was appointed liquidator of Royal Excelsior Mouscron, football club playing in Jupilerproleague (1st Belgian division championship).
