= Philippe Moureaux =

Belgian politician and historian (1939–2018)

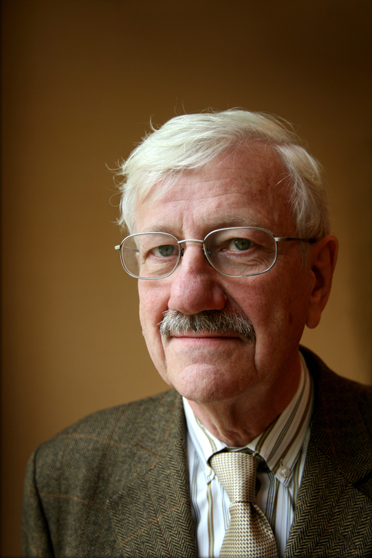

Minister-President of the French Community
- In office 12 February 1988 – 9 May 1988
- Preceded by: Philippe Monfils
- Succeeded by: Valmy Féaux
- In office 22 December 1981 – 9 December 1985
- Preceded by: Position established
- Succeeded by: Philippe Monfils

Personal details
- Born: 12 April 1939 Etterbeek, Belgium
- Died: 15 December 2018 (aged 79) Brussels
- Party: Socialist Party
- Education: Université libre de Bruxelles

Philippe Moureaux (12 April 1939 – 15 December 2018) was a Belgian politician, senator, mayor of Molenbeek-Saint-Jean, and professor of economic history at the Université libre de Bruxelles. He held the honorary title of Minister of State and was a member of the Order of Leopold II and the Order of Leopold.

== Biography ==
Philippe Moureaux was born on 12 April 1939 in Etterbeek. He was the son of liberal minister Charles Moureaux and a mother from the Blaton family, known for its industrial background. He was married to Françoise Dupuis, a former president of the Brussels Parliament and former government minister, with whom he had two daughters, Claire and Catherine Moureaux.

He divorced in early 2010 and remarried on 26 June of the same year. His second wife, Latifa Benaicha, was 35 years younger than him, of Muslim faith, and worked as a staff member in the office of Brussels Minister-President Charles Picqué.

== Minister ==
His first government post was a Minister of the Interior and Institutional Reform in the government of Wilfried Martens (Martens III) in 1980. Moureaux's name was attached to the loi contre le racisme et la xénophobie (Law against Racism and Xenophobia) of 30 July 1981 as he was then serving as Minister of Justice.

Resigning from the Federal Government in 1993, Moureaux's coalition defeated the incumbent mayor of Molenbeek Léon Spiegels at the 1994 council elections. A key part of Moureaux's campaign, then and since, was the involvement of ethnic minorities in the campaign, Mariem Bouselmati of Ecolo being the first Belgian of Moroccan origin elected in Molenbeek. In 2004, as a senator, Moureaux submitted the law granting the right of foreigners to vote in municipal elections.

However, Moureaux's attempts at revitalizing the municipality were not always successful. In June 2011, the multinational company BBDO, citing over 150 attacks on their staff by locals, posted an open letter to Moureaux, announcing its withdrawal from the municipality. As a result, serious questions were raised about governance, security and the administration of Moureaux. Following a general decrease in crime, the company finally decided to remain in Molenbeek.

In 2014, the newspaper La Capitale reported that during Philippe Moureaux’s tenure, 45 individuals were granted access to social housing despite some having incomes significantly above the legal eligibility thresholds. The report suggested that these allocations may have involved preferential treatment attributed to Moureaux.

== Honours ==
- 3 December 1987 : Commander in the Order of Leopold.
- 19 May 1995 : Knight Grand cross in the Order of Leopold II.

== Select bibliography ==
- Les comptes d'une société charbonnière à la fin de l'Ancien Régime (La société de Redemont à Haine-St-Pierre - La Hestre). Brussels, Palais des Académies, 1969. 248 p., illustrated, (Commission Royale d'Histoire).

Political offices
| New office | Minister-President of the French Community; 1981–1985 | Succeeded by Philippe Monfils |
| Preceded by Philippe Monfils | Minister-President of the French Community; 1988 | Succeeded by Valmy Féaux |
