= Sfia Bouarfa =

Belgian politician (born 1950)

Senator
- In office 16 May 2001 – June 2009

Personal details
- Born: 14 October 1950 (age 75) Jerada, Morocco
- Party: PS
- Website: www.sfiabouarfa.be

Sfia Bouarfa (Arabic: صفية بوعرفة) (born 14 October 1950 in Jerada, Morocco) is a Belgian politician and a member of the PS. Since 1995 she is a Member of the Parliament of the Brussels-Capital Region and a Member of the Parliament of the French Community. She was also a Community Senator appointed by the Parliament of the French Community since 16 May 2001.
