= Hugo Vandenberghe =

Belgian politician and professor

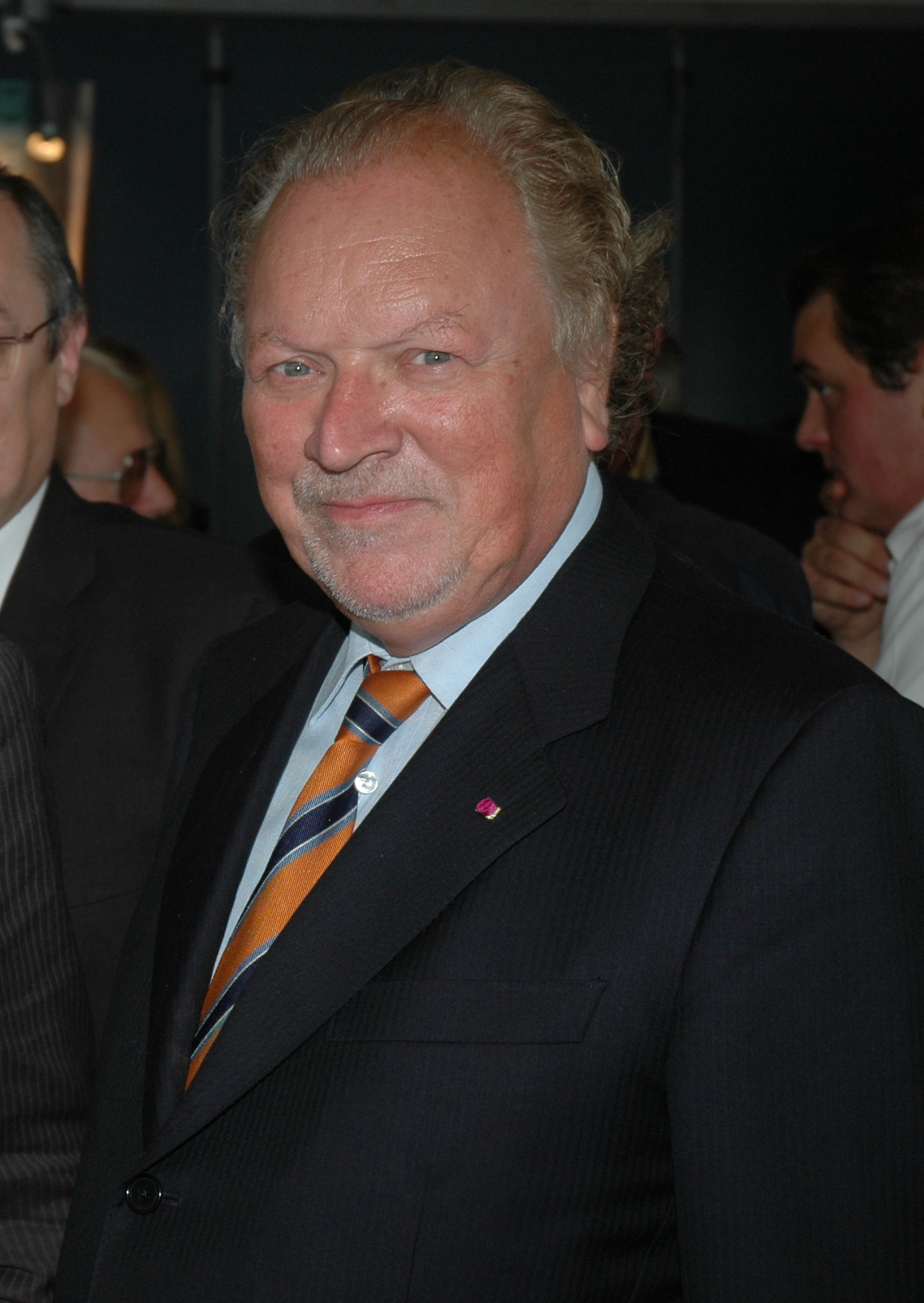

Senator of Belgium
- Incumbent
- Assumed office 1991

Personal details
- Born: 1942 (age 83–84)
- Party: Christen-Democratisch en Vlaams
- Website: www.hugovandenberghe.be

Hugo Vandenberghe (born in 1942) is a Belgian politician and a professor at Katholieke Universiteit Leuven (Law Faculty).

From 1973 to 1977, Hugo Vandenberghe served as advisor in several cabinets of Minister Leo Tindemans. From 1984 to 1990, he was member of the European Committee on Human Rights in Strasbourg. In 1991, he was co-opted Senator, and, in 1999, he was elected Senator.

Hugo Vandenberghe was the Fraction Leader of the Christen-Democratisch en Vlaams (CD&V) from 1995 to 2003. Following the federal elections of 2003, he became Vice President of the Senate and President of the Senate's Justice Committee. Although he sits on several Senate committees and has served as President of the Special Investigating Committee on Organized Crime, Hugo Vandenberghe is regarded as a Law and Justice specialist within the CD&V. In particular, he is known for advocating amendments to existing legislation and for proposing new legislation.

Although Hugo Vandenberghe has a conservative profile within the CD&V, he has been considered to be a negotiator. For instance, in the ethical debates on gay marriage and euthanasia since the 1990s, he has striven for multilateral agreement, although not always successfully. Since 1999, when the Christelijke Volkspartij (CVP, renamed Christen-Democratisch en Vlaams in 2001) became an opposition party, Hugo Vandenberghe has been opposed to the new Belgian law on euthanasia of the Liberal-Socialist-Green coalition.

== Honour ==
- (Kingdom of the Two Sicilies) Two Sicilian Royal Family: Knight Grand Cross of Merit of the Sacred Military Constantinian Order of Saint George
