= Erika Thijs =

Belgian politician (1960–2011)

- Born: Erika Arnoldine Cornelia Thijs; 16 May 1960; Hasselt, Belgium
- Died: 4 August 2011 (aged 51); Bilzen, Belgium
- Occupation: politician

Erika Arnoldine Cornelia Thijs (16 May 1960 – 4 August 2011) was a Flemish politician and member of the Christian Democratic and Flemish party.

Thijs was born in Hasselt. From 1988, she was a member of the Municipal Council of Bilzen, and, from 1995, she was a Senator directly elected by the Dutch language electoral college.
