= Philippe Mahoux =

Belgian politician

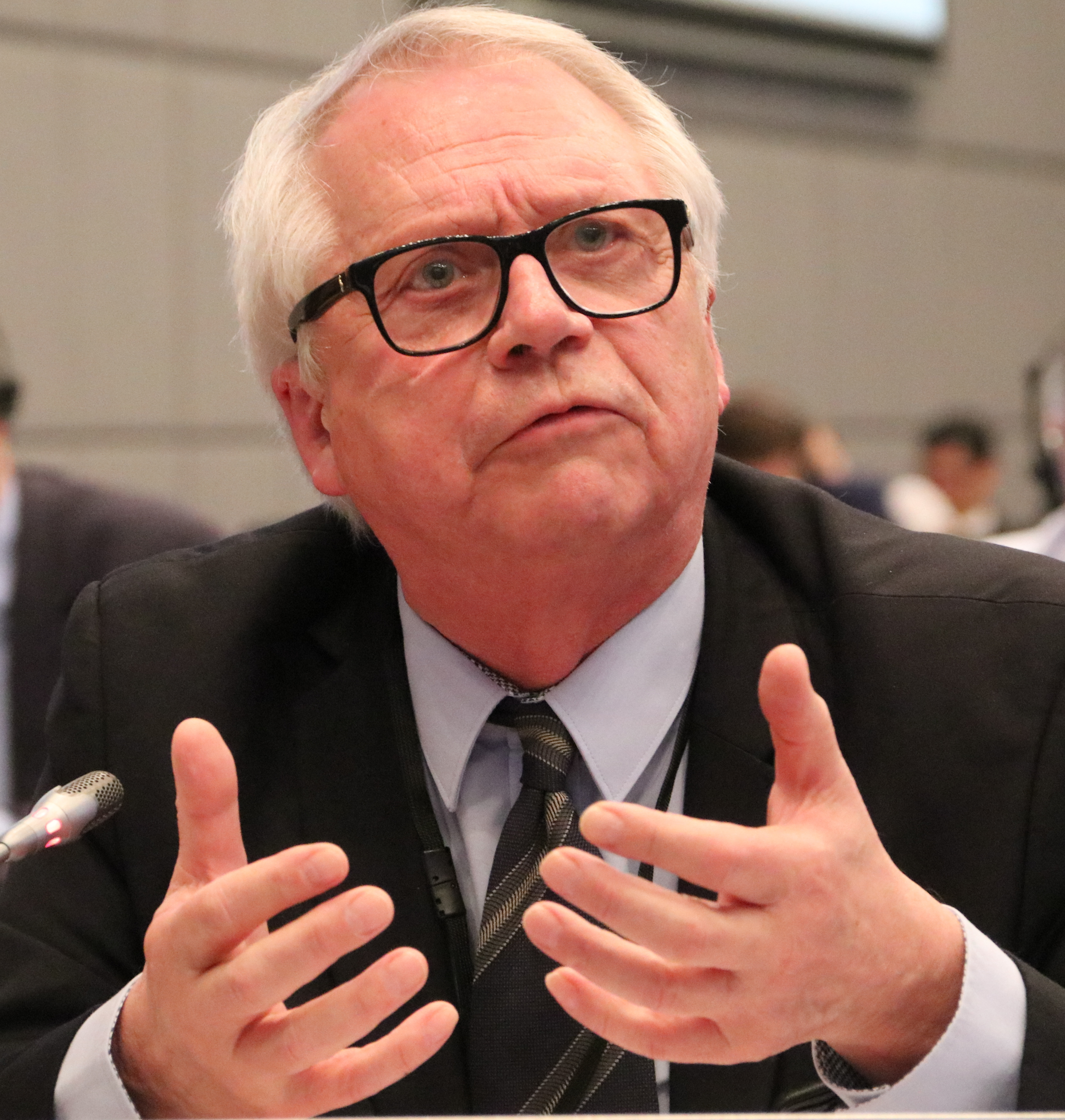
- Mahoux in February 2017

Senator
- Incumbent
- Assumed office 28 October 1990

Personal details
- Born: 26 June 1944 (age 81) Ciney, Belgium
- Party: Parti Socialiste
- Website: www.philippe-mahoux.be

Philippe Mahoux (born 26 June 1944), is a Belgian politician and a member of the Parti Socialiste. He was elected as a member of the Belgian Senate in 1990.
