= Alain Destexhe =

Belgian liberal politician

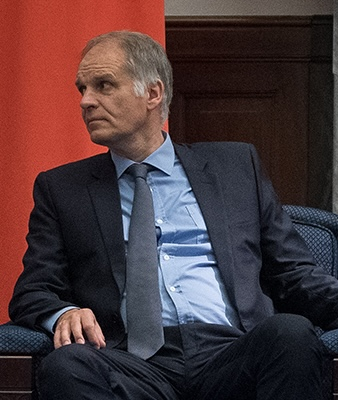
- Alain Destexhe, 2017

Senator, Brussels Parliament
- In office 1995–2019

Personal details
- Born: 19 June 1958 (age 68) Liège, Belgium
- Party: Listes Destexhe/Liberal Democrats (Belgium)
- Education: University of Liège; Sciences Po
- Website: http://www.destexhe.be

Alain Destexhe (French pronunciation: [alɛ̃ dəstɛks]; born 19 June 1958) is a Belgian politician. He was a senator from 1995 to 2011, and remained a member of the Brussels Regional Parliament until 2019. Destexhe was a member of the liberal Mouvement Réformateur (MR) and represented Belgium in the World Economic Forum. He was awarded the Prize for Liberty by Nova Civitas in 2006. He was Secretary-General of Médecins Sans Frontières from 1991 to 1995, and President of the International Crisis Group from 1997 to October 1999.

In February 2019 Destexhe quit the MR due to a disagreement with the party's course. He created his own party, the Listes Destexhe, which is situated to the right of the MR. According to Destexhe, his list is modeled after the Flemish-nationalist N-VA but without the confederalism.

== Early life ==
Alain Destexhe graduated in medicine from the University of Liège. Later he graduated in International Affairs from the Institut d'Études Politiques de Paris.

After his medical studies, Destexhe became volunteer for Médecins Sans Frontières (1985-1988).

He took part to different missions on the ground, notably:

- In a Salvadorean refugee camp (Mesa Grande) in Honduras.
- In Guinea, following the death of the dictator Ahmed Sékou Touré.
- In Guatemala, on the boundary between government and guerrilla. His entire shift was expelled by the military regime.
- In Sudan, with Tigre's refugees who fled their country in order to escape starvation in Ethiopia in 1995.
- In Djibouti.

From 1989 to 1991, Destexhe was the medical assistant director of Pasteur Vaccins (a branch of the Pasteur Institute and Institut Mérieux) in charge of Asia and Latin America.

In 1993, he was appointed for two years as the first General Secretary of the international network of Médecins Sans Frontières. He was then confronted with many international crises: Bosnia, Iraq (1st Gulf War), Rwanda (genocide, 1994), Somalia (famine).

From 1997 to 1999, Destexhe was President of the International Crisis Group (ICG).

== Political career ==
Destexhe was elected a Senator in the 1995 elections, and re-elected in 1999. He was re-elected for the new Mouvement Réformateur in 2003 and 2007 due to support from the Francophone electoral college, but failed to win re-election in 2010. He was also elected to the Parliament of the Brussels-Capital Region in 2004, and re-elected.

During his time in the Senate, Destexhe also served as President of Parliamentarians for Global Action from 2005 to 2007. He is a member of the AWEPA Governing Council.

In 2006 he was awarded the Prize for Liberty by the Flemish liberal think tank Nova Civitas.

After the 2014 elections, Destexhe was reelected to the Senate. He also served as vice-president of the Belgian delegation in the Inter-Parliamentary Union (IPU). In 2014 he was appointed as a rapporteur on the destruction and degradation of the tangible and intangible heritage of Belgium.

In addition to his role in the Senate, Destexhe has been serving as member of the Belgian delegation to the Parliamentary Assembly of the Council of Europe since 2014. As member of the Reformist Movement, he was vice-chairman of the Alliance of Liberals and Democrats for Europe group. Since 2016, he has been serving as chairman of the Assembly's Committee on Legal Affairs and Human Rights as well as of its Sub-Committee on Conflicts between Council of Europe Member States. He is also a member of the Committee on the Honouring of Obligations and Commitments by Member States of the Council of Europe (Monitoring Committee), the Committee on Political Affairs and Democracy and the Sub-Committee on External Relations. Since 2017, he has been the Assembly's rapporteur on Azerbaijan. As a rapporteur for Azerbaijan in PACE he was producing satisfactory statements for the official Baku and called openly to milder the criticism over the human rights situation in Azerbaijan. He authored a report on recommendations for the Council of Europe's co-operation with the International Criminal Court in 2016. Desthexhe is also currently a board member of The Parliamentary Network on the World Bank & International Monetary Fund.

In March 2017, Desthexhe caused controversy when he joined Pedro Agramunt and Jordi Xuclà on a visit to Damascus amid the Syrian civil war.

=== Corruption: Azerbaijani Laundromat ===
Destexhe was implicated in the Azerbaijani Laundromat scandal and confirmed as having connections with Azerbaijani caviar diplomacy and receiving financial means to promote Azerbaijani interests. Destexhe established European Academy for Elections Observations and during at least seven years released groundless positive reports on the elections in Azerbaijan.

== Author ==
Destexhe has published a number of books, including one, translated into English, dealing with the Rwandan genocide. His book deals mainly with historical antecedents leading up to the mass killings in 1994 and who was to blame. Afterwards, his analyses of that era have been used in many parliamentary enquiries and investigation commissions. A 2004 exchange between Destexhe and Canadian general Roméo Dallaire, the military leader of the UN peacekeeping force in Rwanda, can be seen in the CBC documentary Shake Hands with the Devil: The Journey of Roméo Dallaire. Destexhe stated that Dallaire failed to protect his troops and cost the lives of ten Belgian Blue Helmet soldiers in UN service.

He is also the author of several articles (in The New York Times, The Economist, Le Monde, Le Figaro, etc.) on human rights, international relations, international justice and humanitarian assistance.

== Books ==
- Qui a tué nos paras? (1996)
- Rwanda and Genocide in the Twentieth Century (1995), New York University Press and Pluto Press (originally Rwanda, essai sur le genocide, 1994)
- L'humanitaire impossible, ou, Deux siecles d'ambiguite (1993)
- Amerique centrale: Enjeux politiques (Questions au XXe siecle) (1989)
