= Joris Van Hauthem =

Belgian politician (1963–2015)

Personal details
- Born: 29 November 1963 Anderlecht, Belgium
- Died: 25 March 2015 (aged 51) Lennik, Belgium
- Party: Vlaams Belang

Joris Van Hauthem (29 November 1963 – 25 March 2015) was a Belgian politician who was floor leader in the Belgian Senate for the Flemish movement Vlaams Belang party. He was born in Anderlecht, Brussels and lived in Lennik. He died at home on 25 March 2015 due to cancer.

He had a degree in modern history.

== Political functions ==
- member of the Brussels-Capital Council (1989–1995)
- Federal Representative for the electoral district Brussels-Halle-Vilvoorde (1991–1995)
- Flemish Representative for the electoral district Brussels-Halle-Vilvoorde (1995–2014)
- municipal councillor of Lennik (2001–2015)
- Community senator (1995–2010)

He has served as one of three vice-presidents of the Senate.
