= Myriam Vanlerberghe =

Belgian politician

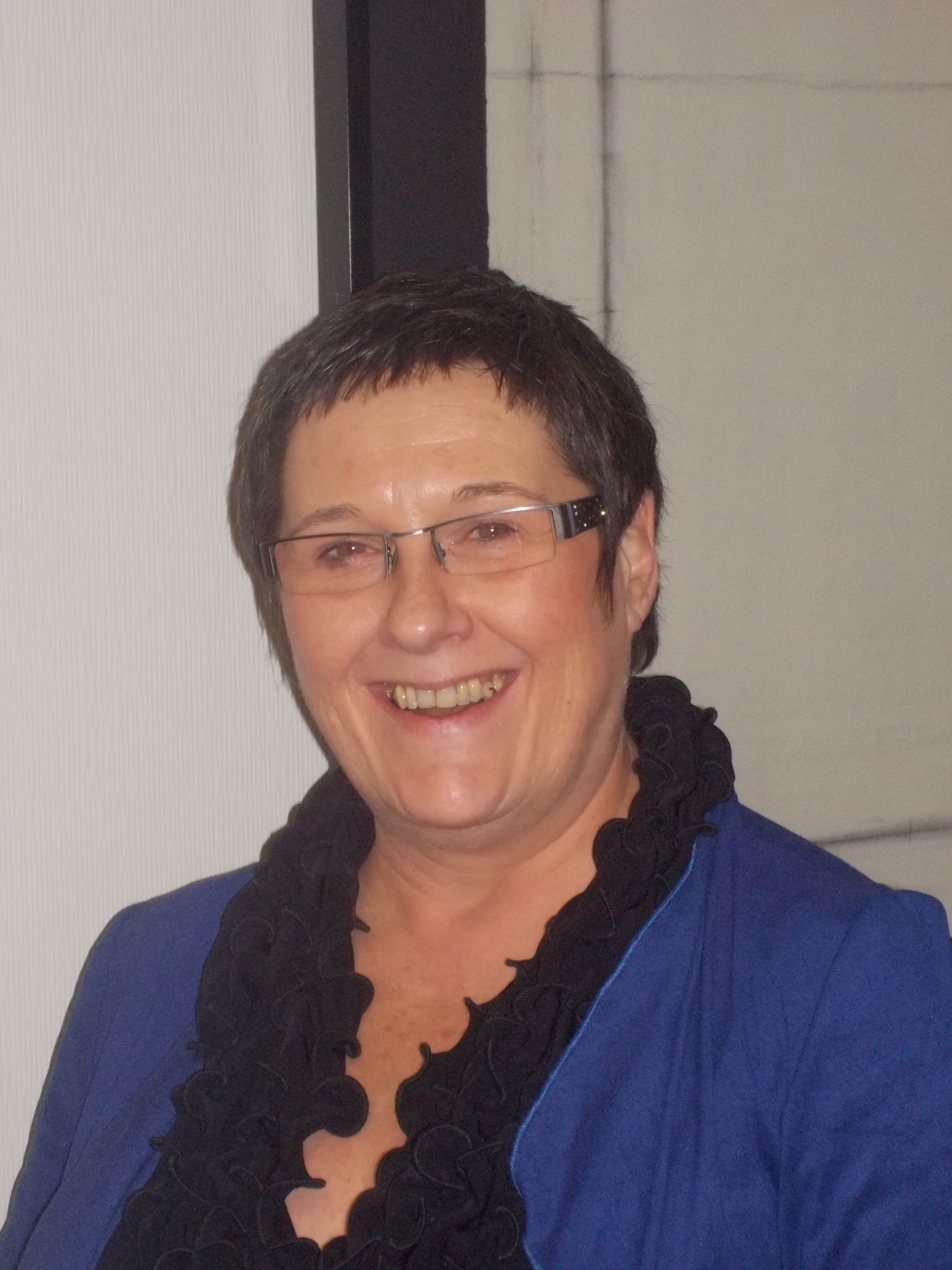

Senator
- In office 28 June 2007 – 13 June 2010

Personal details
- Born: 22 November 1961 (age 64) Izegem
- Party: Socialistische Partij Anders
- Website: www.myriamvanlerberghe.be

Myriam Vanlerberghe (born 1961) is a Belgian politician and a member of the Socialistische Partij Anders. She was elected as a member of the Belgian Senate in 2007.
