= List of members of the European Parliament for Belgium, 1999–2004 =

This is a list of the 25 members of the European Parliament for Belgium in the 1999 to 2004 session.

== List ==
Name	National party	EP Group	Constituency	Votes
Ward Beysen	Flemish Liberals and Democrats	ELDR (until 10 February 2003) NI	Dutch-speaking	
Peter Bossu (until 31 December 1999) Kathleen Van Brempt (from 13 January 2000 until 28 September 2003) Saïd El Khadraoui (from 7 October 2003)	Socialist Party	PES	Dutch-speaking	
Philippe Busquin (until 15 September 1999)Jean-Maurice Dehousse (from 16 September 1999)	Socialist Party	PES	French-speaking	
Willy De Clercq	Flemish Liberals and Democrats	ELDR	Dutch-speaking	
Gérard Deprez	Citizens' Movement for Change	EPP–ED	French-speaking	
Claude Desama (until 5 April 2001) Olga Zrihen (from 6 April 2001)	Socialist Party	PES	French-speaking	
Karel Dillen (until 30 May 2003) Koenraad Dillen (from 16 June 2003)	Flemish Bloc	TGI (until 2 October 2001) NI	Dutch-speaking	
Daniel Ducarme (until 4 June 2003) Anne André-Léonard (from 16 June 2003)	Liberal Reformist Party	ELDR	French-speaking	
Monica Frassoni	Ecolo	G–EFA	French-speaking	
Mathieu Grosch	Christian Social Party	EPP–ED	German-speaking	
Michel Hansenne	Christian Social Party	EPP–ED	French-speaking	
Pierre Jonckheer	Ecolo	G–EFA	French-speaking	
Paul Lannoye	Ecolo	G–EFA	French-speaking	
Nelly Maes	People's Union (from 7 January 2002) Spirit	G–EFA	Dutch-speaking	
Frédérique Ries (until 11 February 2004) Jacqueline Rousseaux (from 19 February 2004)	Liberal Reformist Party	ELDR	French-speaking	
Miet Smet	Christian People's Party	EPP–ED	Dutch-speaking	
Bart Staes	People's Union (from 7 January 2002) Spirit (until 22 September 2002) Groen	G–EFA	Dutch-speaking	
Dirk Sterckx	Flemish Liberals and Democrats	ELDR	Dutch-speaking	
Patsy Sörensen	Agalev (until 7 January 2004) Independent politician	G–EFA	Dutch-speaking	
Freddy Thielemans (until 16 January 2001)Jacques Santkin (from 1 February 2001 until 28 August 2001) Véronique De Keyser (from 25 September 2001)	Socialist Party	PES	French-speaking	
Marianne Thyssen	Christian People's Party	EPP–ED	Dutch-speaking	
Johan Van Hecke	Christian People's Party (until 30 September 2001) Christen-Democratisch en Vlaams (until 26 January 2003) Flemish Liberals and Democrats	EPP–ED (until 17 September 2001) ELDR	Dutch-speaking	
Anne Van Lancker	Socialist Party	PES	Dutch-speaking	
Luckas Vander Taelen (until 31 August 2002)Jan Dhaene (from 1 September 2002)	Agalev (until 7 January 2004) Social Progressive Alternative	G–EFA (until 27 January 2004) PES	Dutch-speaking	
Frank Vanhecke (until 4 June 2003)Philip Claeys (from 16 June 2003)	Flemish Bloc	TGI (until 2 October 2001) NI	Dutch-speaking	

=== Party representation ===
Dutch-speaking electoral college
Party	EP Group	# of seats	±
Flemish Liberals and Democrats	ELDR	3 / 14	Steady
Christian People's Party	EPP–ED	3 / 14	▼1
Flemish Bloc	NI	2 / 14	Steady
Socialist Party	PES	2 / 14	▼1
People's Union	EPP–ED	2 / 14	▲1
Agalev	G–EFA	2 / 14	▲1

French-speaking electoral college
Party	EP Group	# of seats	±
Liberal Reformist Party – Democratic Front of the Francophones	ELDR	3 / 10	Steady
Socialist Party	PES	3 / 10	Steady
Ecolo	G–EFA	3 / 10	▲2
Christian Social Party	EPP–ED	1 / 10	▼1

German-speaking electoral college
Party	EP Group	# of seats	±
Christian Social Party	EPP–ED	1 / 1	Steady
