= List of members of the European Parliament for Belgium, 2014–2019 =

This is a list of the 21 members of the European Parliament for Belgium in the 2014 to 2019 session.

== List ==
Name	National party	EP Group	Constituency
Gerolf Annemans (from 15 June 2015)	Flemish Interest (VB)	ENF	Dutch-speaking
Marie Arena	Socialist Party (PS)	S&D	French-speaking
Pascal Arimont	Christian Social Party (CSP)	EPP	German-speaking
Hugues Bayet	Socialist Party (PS)	S&D	French-speaking
Ivo Belet	Christian Democratic and Flemish (CD&V)	EPP	Dutch-speaking
Philippe De Backer(until 2 May 2016); Lieve Wierinck (from 4 May 2016)	Open Flemish Liberals and Democrats (Open Vld)	ALDE	Dutch-speaking
Mark Demesmaeker	New Flemish Alliance (N-VA)	ECR	Dutch-speaking
Gérard Deprez	Reformist Movement (MR)	ALDE	French-speaking
Louis Ide (until 18 December 2014); Anneleen Van Bossuyt (from 8 January 2015)	New Flemish Alliance (N-VA)	ECR	Dutch-speaking
Philippe Lamberts	Ecology Party (Ecolo)	G–EFA	French-speaking
Louis Michel	Reformist Movement (MR)	ALDE	French-speaking
Annemie Neyts-Uyttebroeck (until 31 December 2014); Hilde Vautmans (from 1 January 2015)	Open Flemish Liberals and Democrats (Open Vld)	ALDE	Dutch-speaking
Frédérique Ries	Reformist Movement (MR)	ALDE	French-speaking
Claude Rolin	Humanist Democratic Centre (CDH)	EPP	French-speaking
Bart Staes	Green (Groen)	G–EFA	Dutch-speaking
Helga Stevens	New Flemish Alliance (N-VA)	ECR	Dutch-speaking
Marc Tarabella	Socialist Party (PS)	S&D	French-speaking
Marianne Thyssen (until 31 October 2014); Tom Vandenkendelaere (from 6 November 2014)	Christian Democratic and Flemish (CD&V)	EPP	Dutch-speaking
Kathleen Van Brempt	Socialist Party–Differently (sp.a)	S&D	Dutch-speaking
Johan Van Overtveldt (until 10 October 2014); Sander Loones (from 14 October 2014 to 11 November 2018); Ralph Packet (from 22 November 2018)	New Flemish Alliance (N-VA)	ECR	Dutch-speaking
Guy Verhofstadt	Open Flemish Liberals and Democrats (Open Vld)	ALDE	Dutch-speaking

=== Party representation ===
Dutch-speaking electoral college
Party	# of seats	±
New Flemish Alliance	4 / 12	▲3
Open Flemish Liberals and Democrats	3 / 12	0
Christian Democratic and Flemish	2 / 12	▼1
Socialist Party–Differently	1 / 12	▼1
Green	1 / 12	0
Flemish Interest	1 / 12	▼1
List Dedecker	0 / 12	▼1

French-speaking electoral college
Party	# of seats	±
Socialist Party	3 / 8	0
Reformist Movement	3 / 8	▲1
Ecology Party	1 / 8	▼1
Humanist Democratic Centre	1 / 8	0

German-speaking electoral college
Party	# of seats	±
Christian Social Party	1 / 1	0
