= List of members of the European Parliament for Belgium, 2004–2009 =

This is a list of the 24 members of the European Parliament for Belgium in the 2004 to 2009 session.

== List ==
Name	National party	EP Group	Constituency	Votes
Ivo Belet	Christian Democratic and Flemish	EPP–ED	Dutch-speaking	142,554
Frieda Brepoels	New Flemish Alliance	EPP–ED	Dutch-speaking	99,464
Philippe Busquin	Socialist Party	PES	French-speaking	114,503
Philip Claeys	Flemish Interest	NI	Dutch-speaking	43,036
Jean-Luc Dehaene	Christian Democratic and Flemish	EPP–ED	Dutch-speaking	651,345
Véronique De Keyser	Socialist Party	PES	French-speaking	46,832
Gérard Deprez	Reformist Movement	ALDE	French-speaking	34,024
Mia De Vits	Socialist Party–Differently	PES	Dutch-speaking	202,082
Koenraad Dillen	Flemish Interest	NI	Dutch-speaking	55,550
Antoine Duquesne	Reformist Movement	ALDE	French-speaking	58,785
Saïd El Khadraoui	Socialist Party–Differently	PES	Dutch-speaking	60,712
Mathieu Grosch	Christian Social Party	EPP–ED	German-speaking	9,211
Alain Hutchinson	Socialist Party	PES	French-speaking	28,672
Pierre Jonckheer	Ecology Party	G–EFA	French-speaking	23,236
Raymond Langendries	Humanist Democratic Centre	EPP–ED	French-speaking	50,871
Annemie Neyts-Uyttebroeck	Open Flemish Liberals and Democrats–Vivant	ALDE	Dutch-speaking	104,218
Frédérique Ries	Reformist Movement	ALDE	French-speaking	123,000
Bart Staes	Green!	G–EFA	Dutch-speaking	79,508
Dirk Sterckx	Open Flemish Liberals and Democrats–Vivant	ALDE	Dutch-speaking	180,774
Marc Tarabella	Socialist Party	PES	French-speaking	31,818
Marianne Thyssen	Christian Democratic and Flemish	EPP–ED	Dutch-speaking	116,418
Frank Vanhecke	Flemish Interest	NI	Dutch-speaking	260,430
Johan Van Hecke	Open Flemish Liberals and Democrats–Vivant	ALDE	Dutch-speaking	34,190
Anne Van Lancker	Socialist Party–Differently	PES	Dutch-speaking	60,483

=== Party representation ===
Dutch-speaking electoral college
Party	EP Group	# of seats	±
Christian Democratic and Flemish – New Flemish Alliance	EPP–ED	4 / 14	▲1
Flemish Bloc	NI	3 / 14	▲1
Flemish Liberals and Democrats	ALDE	3 / 14	Steady
Socialist Party–Differently	PES	3 / 14	▲1
Green!	G–EFA	1 / 14	Steady

French-speaking electoral college
Party	EP Group	# of seats	±
Socialist Party	PES	4 / 9	▲1
Reformist Movement	ALDE	3 / 9	Steady
Humanist Democratic Centre	EPP–ED	1 / 9	Steady
Ecology Party	G–EFA	1 / 9	▼2

German-speaking electoral college
Party	EP Group	# of seats	±
Christian Social Party	EPP–ED	1 / 1	Steady
