= List of members of the European Parliament for Belgium, 1989–1994 =

This is a list of the 24 members of the European Parliament for Belgium in the 1989 to 1994 session.

== List ==
Name	National party	EP Group	Constituency
Willy De Clercq	Party for Freedom and Progress	LDR	Dutch-speaking
François-Xavier de Donnea	Liberal Reformist Party	LDR	French-speaking
Karel De Gucht	Party for Freedom and Progress	LDR	Dutch-speaking
Jean Defraigne	Liberal Reformist Party	LDR	French-speaking
Claude Delcroix	Socialist Party	SOC	French-speaking
Gérard Deprez	Christian Social Party	EPP	French-speaking
Claude Desama	Socialist Party	SOC	French-speaking
Elio Di Rupo	Socialist Party	SOC	French-speaking
Karel Dillen	Flemish Bloc	ER	Dutch-speaking
Raymonde Dury	Socialist Party	SOC	French-speaking
Brigitte Ernst de la Graete	Ecology Party	G	French-speaking
Marc Galle	Socialist Party	SOC	Dutch-speaking
Ernest Glinne	Socialist Party	SOC	French-speaking
José Happart	Socialist Party	SOC	French-speaking
Fernand Herman	Christian Social Party	EPP	French-speaking
An Hermans	Christian People's Party	EPP	Dutch-speaking
Paul Lannoye	Ecology Party	G	French-speaking
Pol Marck	Christian People's Party	EPP	Dutch-speaking
Karel Pinxten	Christian People's Party	EPP	Dutch-speaking
Paul Staes	Agalev	G	Dutch-speaking
Marianne Thyssen	Christian People's Party	EPP	Dutch-speaking
Leo Tindemans	Christian People's Party	EPP	Dutch-speaking
Marijke Van Hemeldonck	Socialist Party	SOC	Dutch-speaking
Jaak Vandemeulebroucke	People's Union	RBW	Dutch-speaking
