= Dutch-speaking electoral college =

Constituency of the European Parliament

- European Parliament constituency
- Location among the current constituencies

- Shown within Belgium
- Member state: Belgium
- Created: 1979
- MEPs: 12

The Dutch-speaking electoral college is one of three constituencies of the European Parliament in Belgium. It currently elects 13 MEPs using the D'Hondt method of party-list proportional representation. Before it elected 14 MEPs, until the 2007 accession of Bulgaria and Romania.

== Boundaries ==
The constituency generally corresponds to the Flemish Community of Belgium, and is sometimes called the Flemish-speaking electoral college. In officially bilingual Brussels, electors can choose between lists of this electoral college or those of the French-speaking electoral college.

Prior to the 2011–2012 state reform, voters could choose between both lists not only in Brussels, but in an area encompassing unilingually Dutch territory, Brussels-Halle-Vilvoorde; some towns in the officially Dutch-speaking Brussels Periphery still have this option.

== Members of the European Parliament ==
Representatives of the Dutch-Speaking community (1979–present)
Election	Member of the European Parliament (Party)													
1979	Lambert Croux (CVP)	Paul De Keersmaeker (CVP)	Jaak Henckens (CVP)	Léo Tindemans (CVP)	Marcel Vandewiele (CVP)	Joris Verhaegen (CVP)	Joannes Verroken (CVP)	Willy De Clercq (PVV)	Herman Vanderpoorten (PVV)	Maurits Coppieters (VU)	Marcel Colla (SP)	Karel Van Miert (SP)	12 seats	
1984	Lambert Croux (CVP)	Raphaël Chanterie (CVP)	Rika De Backer (CVP)	Pol Marck (CVP)	Paul Staes (Agalev)	Willy Kuijpers (VU)	Jef Ulburghs (SP)	Karel De Gucht (PVV)	August de Winter (PVV)	Jaak Vandemeulebroucke (VU)	Marijke Van Hemeldonck (SP)	Karel Van Miert (SP)	Willy Vernimmen (SP)	13 seats
1989	Marianne Thyssen (CVP/ CD&V)	Leo Tindemans (CVP)	An Hermans (CVP)	Pol Marck (CVP)	Paul Staes (Agalev)	Karel Pinxten (CVP)	Karel Dillen (VB)	Karel De Gucht (PVV)	Willy De Clercq (PVV/ VLD)	Jaak Vandemeulebroucke (VU)	Marijke Van Hemeldonck (SP)	Marc Galle (SP)	12 seats	
1994	Marianne Thyssen (CVP/ CD&V)	Leo Tindemans (CVP)	Wilfried Martens (CVP)	Raphaël Chanterie (CVP)	Magda Aelvoet (Agalev)	Marie-Paule Kestelijn-Sierens (PVV)	Karel Dillen (VB)	Annemie Neyts-Uyttebroeck (PVV)	Willy De Clercq (PVV/ VLD)	Jaak Vandemeulebroucke (VU)	Anne Van Lancker (SP/ SP.A)	Philippe De Coene (SP)	Frederik Willockx (SP)	13 seats
1998	Marianne Thyssen (CVP/ CD&V)	Leo Tindemans (CVP)	Wilfried Martens (CVP)	Raphaël Chanterie (CVP)	Magda Aelvoet (Agalev)	Marie-Paule Kestelijn-Sierens (PVV)	Karel Dillen (VB)	Annemie Neyts-Uyttebroeck (PVV)	Willy De Clercq (PVV/ VLD)	Nelly Maes (VU)	Anne Van Lancker (SP/ SP.A)	Philippe De Coene (SP)	Frederik Willockx (SP)	13 seats
1999	Marianne Thyssen (CVP/ CD&V)	Miet Smet (CVP)	Johan Van Hecke (CVP /VLD)	Frank Vanhecke (VB)	Patsy Sörensen (Agalev)	Ward Beysen (VLD)	Karel Dillen (VB)	Dirk Sterckx (VLD/ Open VLD)	Willy De Clercq (PVV/ VLD)	Nelly Maes (VU)	Anne Van Lancker (SP/ SP.A)	Bart Staes (VU/ Groen)	Peter Bossu (SP)	Luckas Vander Taelen (Agalev)
2000	Marianne Thyssen (CVP/ CD&V)	Miet Smet (CVP)	Johan Van Hecke (CVP /VLD)	Frank Vanhecke (VB)	Patsy Sörensen (Agalev)	Ward Beysen (VLD)	Karel Dillen (VB)	Dirk Sterckx (VLD/ Open VLD)	Willy De Clercq (PVV/ VLD)	Nelly Maes (VU)	Anne Van Lancker (SP/ SP.A)	Bart Staes (VU/ Groen)	Kathleen Van Brempt (SP)	Luckas Vander Taelen (Agalev)
2002	Marianne Thyssen (CVP/ CD&V)	Miet Smet (CVP)	Johan Van Hecke (CVP /VLD)	Frank Vanhecke (VB)	Patsy Sörensen (Agalev)	Ward Beysen (VLD)	Karel Dillen (VB)	Dirk Sterckx (VLD/ Open VLD)	Willy De Clercq (PVV/ VLD)	Nelly Maes (VU)	Anne Van Lancker (SP/ SP.A)	Bart Staes (VU/ Groen)	Kathleen Van Brempt (SP)	Jan Dhaene (Agalev)
2003	Marianne Thyssen (CVP/ CD&V)	Miet Smet (CVP)	Johan Van Hecke (CVP /VLD)	Koenraad Dillen (VB)	Patsy Sörensen (Agalev)	Ward Beysen (VLD)	Frank Vanhecke (VB)	Dirk Sterckx (VLD/ Open VLD)	Willy De Clercq (PVV/ VLD)	Nelly Maes (VU)	Anne Van Lancker (SP/ SP.A)	Bart Staes (VU/ Groen)	Saïd El Khadraoui (SP)	Jan Dhaene (Agalev)
2004	Marianne Thyssen (CVP/ CD&V)	Jean-Luc Dehaene (CD&V)	Johan Van Hecke (CVP /VLD)	Koenraad Dillen (VB)	Ivo Belet (CD&V)	Annemie Neyts-Uyttebroeck (VLD/ Open VLD)	Frank Vanhecke (VB)	Dirk Sterckx (VLD/ Open VLD)	Philip Claeys (VB)	Frieda Brepoels (NVA)	Anne Van Lancker (SP/ SP.A)	Bart Staes (VU/ Groen)	Saïd El Khadraoui (SP)	Mia De Vits (SP.A)
2009	Marianne Thyssen (CVP/ CD&V)	Jean-Luc Dehaene (CD&V)	Guy Verhofstadt (Open VLD)	Derk Jan Eppink (LDD)	Ivo Belet (CD&V)	Annemie Neyts-Uyttebroeck (VLD/ Open VLD)	Frank Vanhecke (VB)	Dirk Sterckx (VLD/ Open VLD)	Philip Claeys (VB)	Frieda Brepoels (NVA)	Kathleen Van Brempt (SP.A/ Vooruit)	Bart Staes (VU/ Groen)	Saïd El Khadraoui (SP)	13 seats
2011	Marianne Thyssen (CVP/ CD&V)	Jean-Luc Dehaene (CD&V)	Guy Verhofstadt (Open VLD)	Derk Jan Eppink (LDD)	Ivo Belet (CD&V)	Annemie Neyts-Uyttebroeck (VLD/ Open VLD)	Frank Vanhecke (VB)	Philippe De Backer (Open VLD)	Philip Claeys (VB)	Frieda Brepoels (NVA)	Kathleen Van Brempt (SP.A/ Vooruit)	Bart Staes (VU/ Groen)	Saïd El Khadraoui (SP)	13 seats
2013	Marianne Thyssen (CVP/ CD&V)	Jean-Luc Dehaene (CD&V)	Guy Verhofstadt (Open VLD)	Derk Jan Eppink (LDD)	Ivo Belet (CD&V)	Annemie Neyts-Uyttebroeck (VLD/ Open VLD)	Frank Vanhecke (VB)	Philippe De Backer (Open VLD)	Philip Claeys (VB)	Mark Demesmaeker (NVA)	Kathleen Van Brempt (SP.A/ Vooruit)	Bart Staes (VU/ Groen)	Saïd El Khadraoui (SP)	13 seats
2014	Marianne Thyssen (CVP/ CD&V)	Jean-Luc Dehaene (CD&V)	Guy Verhofstadt (Open VLD)	Derk Jan Eppink (LDD)	Ivo Belet (CD&V)	Annemie Neyts-Uyttebroeck (VLD/ Open VLD)	Frank Vanhecke (VB)	Philippe De Backer (Open VLD)	Philip Claeys (VB)	Mark Demesmaeker (NVA)	Kathleen Van Brempt (SP.A/ Vooruit)	Bart Staes (VU/ Groen)	Saïd El Khadraoui (SP)	13 seats
2014	Marianne Thyssen (CVP/ CD&V)	Helga Stevens (NVA)	Guy Verhofstadt (Open VLD)	Louis Ide (NVA)	Ivo Belet (CD&V)	Annemie Neyts-Uyttebroeck (VLD/ Open VLD)	Johan Van Overtveldt (NVA)	Philippe De Backer (Open VLD)	Gerolf Annemans (VB)	Mark Demesmaeker (NVA)	Kathleen Van Brempt (SP.A/ Vooruit)	Bart Staes (VU/ Groen)	12 seats	
2014	Tom Vandenkendelaere (CD&V)	Helga Stevens (NVA)	Guy Verhofstadt (Open VLD)	Louis Ide (NVA)	Ivo Belet (CD&V)	Annemie Neyts-Uyttebroeck (VLD/ Open VLD)	Sander Loones (NVA)	Philippe De Backer (Open VLD)	Gerolf Annemans (VB)	Mark Demesmaeker (NVA)	Kathleen Van Brempt (SP.A/ Vooruit)	Bart Staes (VU/ Groen)	12 seats	
2015	Tom Vandenkendelaere (CD&V)	Helga Stevens (NVA)	Guy Verhofstadt (Open VLD)	Anneleen Van Bossuyt (NVA)	Ivo Belet (CD&V)	Annemie Neyts-Uyttebroeck (VLD/ Open VLD)	Sander Loones (NVA)	Philippe De Backer (Open VLD)	Gerolf Annemans (VB)	Mark Demesmaeker (NVA)	Kathleen Van Brempt (SP.A/ Vooruit)	Bart Staes (VU/ Groen)	12 seats	
2016	Tom Vandenkendelaere (CD&V)	Helga Stevens (NVA)	Guy Verhofstadt (Open VLD)	Anneleen Van Bossuyt (NVA)	Ivo Belet (CD&V)	Lieve Wierinck (Open VLD)	Sander Loones (NVA)	Hilde Vautmans (Open VLD)	Gerolf Annemans (VB)	Mark Demesmaeker (NVA)	Kathleen Van Brempt (SP.A/ Vooruit)	Bart Staes (VU/ Groen)	12 seats	
2018	Tom Vandenkendelaere (CD&V)	Helga Stevens (NVA)	Guy Verhofstadt (Open VLD)	Anneleen Van Bossuyt (NVA)	Ivo Belet (CD&V)	Lieve Wierinck (Open VLD)	Ralph Packet (NVA)	Hilde Vautmans (Open VLD)	Gerolf Annemans (VB)	Mark Demesmaeker (NVA)	Kathleen Van Brempt (SP.A/ Vooruit)	Bart Staes (VU/ Groen)	12 seats	
2019	Kris Peeters (CD&V)	Geert Bourgeois (NVA)	Guy Verhofstadt (Open VLD)	Assita Kanko (NVA)	Cindy Franssen (CD&V)	Filip De Man (VB)	Johan Van Overtveldt (NVA)	Hilde Vautmans (Open VLD)	Gerolf Annemans (VB)	Tom Vandendriessche (VB)	Kathleen Van Brempt (SP.A/ Vooruit)	Petra De Sutter (Groen)	12 seats	
2024	Wouter Beke (CD&V)	Kris Van Dijck (NVA)	Rudi Kennes (PTB)	Assita Kanko (NVA)	Liesbet Sommen (CD&V)	Barbara Bonte (VB)	Johan Van Overtveldt (NVA)	Hilde Vautmans (Open VLD)	Gerolf Annemans (VB)	Tom Vandendriessche (VB)	Kathleen Van Brempt (SP.A/ Vooruit)	Sara Matthieu (Groen)	Bruno Tobback (Vooruit)	13 seats

== Election results ==
=== 2024 ===
Party	EU party	EP group	Votes	%	Change	Seats	Change
Flemish Interest	ID	PfE	1,034,112	22.94	−3.86	3	-
New-Flemish Alliance	EFA	ECR	995,868	22.09	−0.35	3	-
Christian Democratic and Flemish	EPP	EPP	594,968	13.20	−2.33	2	-
Vooruit	PES	S&D	570,067	12.64	+2.43	2	+1
Groen	EGP	G-EFA	450,781	10.00	−2.37	1	-
Open Flemish Liberals and Democrats	ALDE	RE	410,743	9.11	−6.84	1	-1
Workers' Party of Belgium	ELA	Left	366,285	8.12	+3.17	1	+1
For You	NI	NI	47,243	1.05	new	0	new
Volt Belgium	NI	NI	38,713	0.86	+0.83	0	-

=== 2019 ===
Party	EU party	EP group	Votes	%	Change	Seats	Change
New-Flemish Alliance	EFA	ECR	954,048	22.44	−4.23	3	-1
Flemish Interest	ID Party	ID	811,169	19.08	+12.32	3	+2
Open Flemish Liberals and Democrats	ALDE	Renew	678,051	15.95	−4.45	2	-1
Christian Democratic and Flemish	EPP	EPP	617,651	14.53	−5.43	2	0
Green	EGP	Greens/EFA	525,908	12.37	+1.75	1	0
Socialist Party Different	PES	S&D	434,002	10.21	−2.97	1	0
Workers' Party of Belgium	None	GUE/NGL	210,391	4.95	+2.55	0	0
Volt Belgium	Volt Europa	None	20,385	0.48	+0.48	0	0
Total			4,251,605	100		12	0

=== 2014 ===
Party	EU party	EP group	Votes	%	Change	Seats	Change
New-Flemish Alliance	EFA	ECR	1,123,363	26.67	+16.79	4	+3
Open Flemish Liberals and Democrats	ALDE	ALDE	859,254	20.40	−0.2	3	0
Christian Democratic and Flemish	EPP	EPP	840,814	19.96	−3.34	2	−1
Socialist Party Different	PES	S&D	555,354	13.18	−0.05	1	−1
Flemish Interest	EAF	None	284,891	6.76	−9.14	1	−1
Green	EGP	Greens/EFA	447,449	10.62	+2.72	1	0
Workers' Party of Belgium	None	None	101,246	2.40	+1.42	0	0
Total			4,212,371	100		12	−1

=== 2009 ===
Party	Affiliation	Votes	%	Change	Seats	Change
Christian Democratic and Flemish	EPP	948,123	23.26	−4.89	3	0
Open Flemish Liberals and Democrats	ELDR	837,884	20.56	−1.35	3	0
Flemish Interest	None	647,170	15.88	−7.28	2	−1
Socialist Party Different	PES	539,393	13.23	−4.60	2	−1
New-Flemish Alliance	EFA/EPP-ED group (previous term)	402,545	9.88	+9.88	1	0
Green!	EGP	322,149	7.90	−0.08	1	0
List Dedecker	None, (joined ECR)	296,699	7.28	N/A	1	N/A
Workers' Party of Belgium+	None	40,057	0.98	+0.37	0	0
Social Liberal Party	EFA	26,541	0.65	N/A	0	N/A
Others		15,383	0.38		0	
Total		4,075,944	100		13	−1

=== 2004 ===
Party	Affiliation	Votes	%	Change	Seats	Change
Christian Democratic and Flemish/New Flemish Alliance		1,131,119	28.15	+6.47	4	+1
Vlaams Blok		930,731	23.16	+8.07	3	+1
Flemish Liberals and Democrats		880,279	21.91	−1.7	3	0
Social Progressive Alternative-Spirit		716,317	17.83	+3.62	3	+1
Groen!		320,874	7.99	−3.99	1	−1
Workers' Party of Belgium		24,807	0.62	0.05	0	0
Left Socialist Party		14,166	0.35	N/A	0	N/A
Total		4,018,293	100		14	0

=== 1999 ===
Party	Affiliation	Votes	%	Change	Seats	Change
Flemish Liberals and Democrats		847,099	21.88%	+3.52%	3	0
Christian People's Party		839,720	21.68%	−5.75%	3	−1
Vlaams Blok		584,392	15.09%	+2.53%	2	0
Socialist Party		550,237	14.21%	−3.42%	2	−1
People's Union-ID		471,238	12.17%	+5.08%	2	+1
Agalev-Groen		464,042	11.98%	+1.25%	2	+1
Vivant		67,107	1.73%	N/A	0	N/A
Others		48,589	1.25%		0	0
Total		3,872,424	100		14	0

=== 1994 ===
Party	Affiliation	Votes	%	Change	Seats	Change
Christian People's Party		1,013,266	27.43%	−6.65%	4	−1
Flemish Liberals and Democrats		678,421	18.36%	+1.26%	3	+1
Socialist Party		651,371	17.63%	−2.41%	3	0
Vlaams Blok		463,919	12.56%	+5.97%	2	+1
Agalev		396,198	10.73%	−1.47%	1	0
People's Union		262,043	7.09%	−1.61%	1	+1
WOW		127,504	3.45%	N/A	0	N/A
Others		101,427	2.75%		0	0
Total			100		14	+1

=== 1989 ===
Party	Affiliation	Votes	%	Change	Seats	Change
Christian People's Party		1,247,075	34.08%	+1.55%	5	+1
Socialist Party		733,242	20.04%	−8.09%	3	−1
Party for Freedom and Progress		625,561	17.10%	+2.91%	2	0
Agalev-Groen		446,539	12.20%	+5.12%	1	0
People's Union-EVA		318,153	8.70%	−5.21%	1	−1
Vlaams Blok		241,117	6.59%	+4.49%	1	+1
Others		47,219	1.29%		0	0
Total			100		13	0

=== 1984 ===
Party	Affiliation	Votes	%	Change	Seats	Change
Christian People's Party		1,132,682	32.53%	−15.56%	4	−3
Socialist Party		979,702	28.13%	+7.23%	4	+1
Party for Freedom and Progress		494,277	14.19%	−1.13%	2	0
People's Union		484,494	13.91%	+4.20%	2	+1
Agalev		246,712	7.08%	+4.75%	1	+1
Vlaams Blok		73,174	2.10%	N/A	0	N/A
Others		71,239	2.05%		0	0
Total			100		13	0

=== 1979 ===
Party	Affiliation	Votes	%	Change	Seats	Change
Christian People's Party		1,607,941	48.09%	N/A	7	N/A
Belgian Socialist Party		698,889	20.90%	N/A	3	N/A
Party for Freedom and Progress		512,363	15.32%	N/A	2	N/A
People's Union		324,540	9.71%	N/A	1	N/A
Agalev		77,986	2.33%	N/A	0	N/A
Others		121,783	3.64%	N/A	0	N/A
Total			100	N/A	13	N/A

== Returned members ==
Below are all members since the creation of the Dutch-speaking electoral college. Only members who were sworn in at the beginning of each parliamentary turn are mentioned. Under Belgian law, MEPs can resign and be automatically replaced. This was the case, for example, for Johan Van Overtveldt, who resigned to become Minister of Finance on 14 October 2014 and was replaced by Sander Loones.

MEPs for Belgium's Dutch-speaking electoral college, 1979 onwards
Election	1979 (1st parliament)	1984 (2nd parliament)	1989 (3rd parliament)	1994 (4th parliament)	1999 (5th parliament)	2004 (6th parliament)	2009 (7th parliament)	2014 (8th parliament)	2019 (9th parliament)
MEP Party	Willy Vernimmen; SP		Seat not established	Anne Van Lancker; SP			Seat abolished		
MEP Party	Karel Van Miert; SP		Marc Galle; SP	Philippe De Coene; SP	Peter Bossu; SP	Saïd El Khadraoui sp.a/Spirit		Seat abolished	
MEP Party	Marcel Colla; SP	Marijke Van Hemeldonck; SP		Freddy Willockx; SP	Luckas Vander Taelen; Agalev	Mia De Vits sp.a/Spirit	Kathleen Van Brempt sp.a		
MEP Party	Willy De Clercq; PVV	Jef Ulburghs; SP	Paul Staes; Agalev	Magda Aelvoet; Agalev	Patsy Sörensen; Agalev	Bart Staes; Groen			Petra De Sutter; Groen
MEP Party	Herman Vanderpoorten; PVV	Paul Staes; Agalev	Willy De Clercq; VLD			Karel De Gucht; VLD/Vivant	Guy Verhofstadt; Open Vld		
MEP Party	Paul De Keersmaeker; CVP	Karel De Gucht; VLD		Annemie Neyts; VLD	Ward Beysen; VLD	Annemie Neyts; VLD/Vivant			Hilde Vautmans; Open Vld
MEP Party	Jaak Henckens; CVP	August de Winter; VLD	An Hermans; CVP	Mimi Kestelijn-Sierens; VLD	Dirk Sterckx; VLD/Vivant		Philippe De Backer; Open Vld	Karel De Gucht; Open Vld	Kris Peeters; CD&V
MEP Party	Joris Verhaegen; CVP	Raphaël Chanterie; CVP			Miet Smet; CVP	Ivo Belet; CD&V/N-VA			Cindy Franssen; CD&V
MEP Party	Lambert Croux; CVP		Marianne Thyssen; CVP						Geert Bourgeois; N-VA
MEP Party	Marcel Vandewiele; CVP	Rika De Backer; CVP	Karel Pinxten; CVP	Wilfried Martens; CVP	Johan Van Hecke; CVP	Jean-Luc Dehaene; CD&V/N-VA		Johan Van Overtveldt; N-VA	
MEP Party	Leo Tindemans; CVP	Pol Marck; CVP	Leo Tindemans; CVP		Nelly Maes; VU	Frieda Brepoels; CD&V/N-VA		Mark Demesmaeker; N-VA	Assita Kanko; N-VA
MEP Party	Joannes Verroken; CVP	Jaak Vandemeulebroucke; VU			Bart Staes; VU	Koen Dillen; VB	Derk-Jan Eppink; LDD	Louis Ide; N-VA	Filip De Man; VB
MEP Party	Maurits Coppieters; VU	Willy Kuijpers; VU	Karel Dillen; VB			Philip Claeys; VB		Helga Stevens; N-VA	Patsy Vatlet; VB
MEP Party	Seat not established			Frank Vanhecke; VB				Gerolf Annemans; VB	
