= List of members of the European Parliament for Belgium, 1984–1989 =

This is a list of the 24 members of the European Parliament for Belgium in the 1984 to 1989 session.

== List ==
Name	National party	EP Group	Constituency
Luc Beyer de Ryke	Liberal Reformist Party	LDR	French-speaking
Raphaël Chanterie	Christian People's Party	EPP	Dutch-speaking
Lambert Croux	Christian People's Party	EPP	Dutch-speaking
Rika De Backer	Christian People's Party	EPP	Dutch-speaking
Karel De Gucht	Party for Freedom and Progress	LDR	Dutch-speaking
August de Winter	Party for Freedom and Progress	LDR	Dutch-speaking
Gérard Deprez	Christian Social Party	EPP	French-speaking
Daniel Ducarme	Liberal Reformist Party	LDR	French-speaking
Raymonde Dury	Socialist Party	SOC	French-speaking
Ernest Glinne	Socialist Party	SOC	French-speaking
José Happart	Socialist Party	SOC	French-speaking
Fernand Herman	Christian Social Party	EPP	French-speaking
Willy Kuijpers	People's Union	RBW	Dutch-speaking
Anne-Marie Lizin	Socialist Party	SOC	French-speaking
Pol Marck	Christian People's Party	EPP	Dutch-speaking
Marcel Remacle	Socialist Party	SOC	French-speaking
François Roelants du Vivier	Ecology Party	RBW	French-speaking
Paul Staes	Agalev	RBW	Dutch-speaking
Michel Toussaint	Liberal Reformist Party	LDR	French-speaking
Jef Ulburghs	Socialist Party	SOC	Dutch-speaking
Marijke Van Hemeldonck	Socialist Party	SOC	Dutch-speaking
Karel Van Miert	Socialist Party	SOC	Dutch-speaking
Jaak Vandemeulebroucke	People's Union	RBW	Dutch-speaking
Willy Vernimmen	Socialist Party	SOC	Dutch-speaking
