= List of members of the European Parliament for Belgium, 1994–1999 =

This is a list of the 25 members of the European Parliament for Belgium in the 1994 to 1999 session.

== List ==
| Name | National party | EP Group | Constituency |
|---|---|---|---|
| Magda Aelvoet | Agalev | G | Dutch-speaking |
| Anne André-Léonard | Liberal Reformist Party | ELDR | French-speaking |
| Raphaël Chanterie | Christian People's Party | EPP | Dutch-speaking |
| Willy De Clercq | Flemish Liberals and Democrats | ELDR | Dutch-speaking |
| Philippe De Coene | Socialist Party | PES | Dutch-speaking |
| Gérard Deprez | Christian Social Party | EPP | French-speaking |
| Claude Desama | Socialist Party | PES | French-speaking |
| Karel Dillen | Flemish Bloc | NI | Dutch-speaking |
| Raymonde Dury (until 30 April 1998) Claude Delcroix (from 1 May 1998) | Socialist Party | PES | French-speaking |
| Daniel Féret | National Front | NI | French-speaking |
| Mathieu Grosch | Christian Social Party | EPP | German-speaking |
| José Happart | Socialist Party | PES | French-speaking |
| Fernand Herman | Christian Social Party | EPP | French-speaking |
| Marie-Paule Kestelijn-Sierens | Flemish Liberals and Democrats | ELDR | Dutch-speaking |
| Paul Lannoye | Ecology Party | G | French-speaking |
| Wilfried Martens | Christian People's Party | EPP | Dutch-speaking |
| Philippe Monfils | Liberal Reformist Party | ELDR | French-speaking |
| Annemie Neyts-Uyttebroeck | Flemish Liberals and Democrats | ELDR | Dutch-speaking |
| Antoinette Spaak | Democratic Front of Francophones | ELDR | French-speaking |
| Marianne Thyssen | Christian People's Party | EPP | Dutch-speaking |
| Leo Tindemans | Christian People's Party | EPP | Dutch-speaking |
| Anne Van Lancker | Socialist Party | PES | Dutch-speaking |
| Jaak Vandemeulebroucke (until 14 October 1998) Nelly Maes (from 16 October 1998) | People's Union | European Radical Alliance | Dutch-speaking |
| Frederik Willockx | Socialist Party | PES | Dutch-speaking |
