= List of members of the European Parliament for Belgium, 2009–2014 =

This is a list of the 22 members of the European Parliament for Belgium in the 2009 to 2014 session.

== Lists ==
Name	National party	EP Group	Constituency	Votes
Ivo Belet	Christian Democratic and Flemish	EPP	Dutch-speaking	157,775
Frieda Brepoels	New Flemish Alliance	G–EFA	Dutch-speaking	67,717
Philip Claeys	Flemish Interest	NI	Dutch-speaking	28,154
Frédéric Daerden (until 19 June 2014)	Socialist Party	S&D	French-speaking	90,294
Jean-Luc Dehaene (until 15 May 2014)	Christian Democratic and Flemish	EPP	Dutch-speaking	450,149
Véronique De Keyser	Socialist Party	S&D	French-speaking	61,024
Anne Delvaux	Humanist Democratic Centre	EPP	French-speaking	124,718
Isabelle Durant	Ecology Party	G–EFA	French-speaking	150,173
Saïd El Khadraoui	Socialist Party–Differently	S&D	Dutch-speaking	50,408
Derk Jan Eppink	List Dedecker / Libertarian, Direct, Democratic	ECR	Dutch-speaking	11,686
Mathieu Grosch	Christian Social Party	EPP	German-speaking	4,762
Philippe Lamberts	Ecology Party	G–EFA	French-speaking	26,430
Louis Michel	Reformist Movement	ALDE	French-speaking	305,363
Annemie Neyts-Uyttebroeck	Open Flemish Liberals and Democrats	ALDE	Dutch-speaking	58,369
Frédérique Ries	Reformist Movement	ALDE	French-speaking	116,398
Bart Staes	Green!	G–EFA	Dutch-speaking	97,036
Dirk Sterckx	Open Flemish Liberals and Democrats	ALDE	Dutch-speaking	100,226
Marc Tarabella	Socialist Party	S&D	French-speaking	50,993
Marianne Thyssen	Christian Democratic and Flemish	EPP	Dutch-speaking	187,303
Kathleen Van Brempt	Socialist Party–Differently	S&D	Dutch-speaking	146,992
Frank Vanhecke	Flemish Interest (until 5 December 2011) Independent	NI (until 8 November 2011) EFD	Dutch-speaking	161,371
Guy Verhofstadt	Open Flemish Liberals and Democrats	ALDE	Dutch-speaking	565,359

=== Party representation ===
Dutch-speaking electoral college
Party	EP Group	# of seats	±
Christian Democratic and Flemish	EPP	3 / 13	Steady
Open Flemish Liberals and Democrats	ALDE	3 / 13	Steady
Flemish Interest	NI	2 / 13	▼1
Socialist Party–Differently	S&D	2 / 13	▼1
New Flemish Alliance	G–EFA	1 / 13	Steady
Green!	G–EFA	1 / 13	Steady
List Dedecker	ECR	1 / 13	▲1

French-speaking electoral college
Party	EP Group	# of seats	±
Socialist Party	S&D	3 / 8	▼1
Reformist Movement	ALDE	2 / 8	▼1
Ecology Party	G–EFA	2 / 8	▲1
Humanist Democratic Centre	EPP	1 / 8	Steady

German-speaking electoral college
Party	EP Group	# of seats	±
Christian Social Party	EPP	1 / 1	Steady
