= List of members of the European Parliament for Belgium, 2019–2024 =

This is a list of the 23 members of the European Parliament for Belgium in the 2019 to 2024 session.

Belgium elected 21 MEPs in 2019.

Party	Elected members
Dutch-speaking electoral college (12)
New Flemish Alliance (3)	Geert Bourgeois, Assita Kanko, Johan Van Overtveldt
Vlaams Belang (3)	Gerolf Annemans, Filip De Man, Tom Vandendriessche
Open Flemish Liberals and Democrats (2)	Guy Verhofstadt, Hilde Vautmans
Christian Democratic & Flemish (2)	Kris Peeters, Cindy Franssen
Groen (1)	Petra De Sutter
Forward (1)	Kathleen Van Brempt
French-speaking electoral college (8)
Socialist Party (2)	Marie Arena, Marc Tarabella
Ecolo (2)	Philippe Lamberts, Saskia Bricmont
Reformist Movement (2)	Olivier Chastel, Frédérique Ries
Workers' Party of Belgium (1)	Marc Botenga
Humanist Democratic Centre (1)	Benoît Lutgen
German-speaking electoral college (1)
Christian Social Party (1)	Pascal Arimont

At the time of the election, Forward (Vooruit) was still named Socialist Party - Differently (Socialistische Partij - Anders).
