= Willy Kuijpers =

Belgian politician (1937–2020)

Member of the Belgian Chamber of Representatives
- In office 1971–1984

First Alderman of Herent
- In office 1983–1988

Member of the European Parliament for the Dutch-speaking electoral college
- In office 24 July 1984 – 24 July 1989
- Preceded by: Maurits Coppieters
- Succeeded by: Karel Dillen

Senator
- In office 1989–1995

Member of the Flemish Parliament
- In office 1995–1997

Personal details
- Born: 1 January 1937 Leuven, Belgium
- Died: 17 November 2020 (aged 83)
- Party: VU; N-VA

Willy Kuijpers (1 January 1937 – 17 November 2020) was a Belgian politician.

== Career ==
A Flemish nationalist, he sat in the Belgian Federal Parliament (both as a representative and a senator), the Flemish Parliament, and the European Parliament, as well as being active in local politics and serving as mayor of Herent. He had a particular interest in education policy and international development aid.

Kuijpers died from COVID-19 in 2020.
