= 1979 European Parliament election in Belgium =

- 10 June 1979

24 seats to the European Parliament
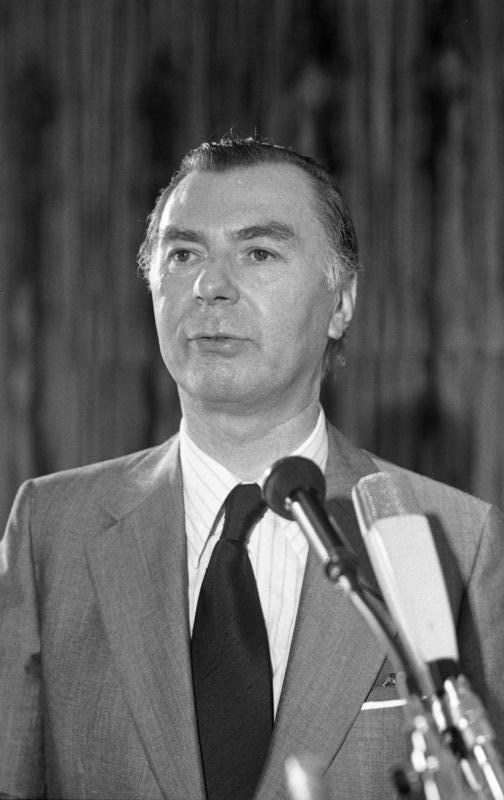

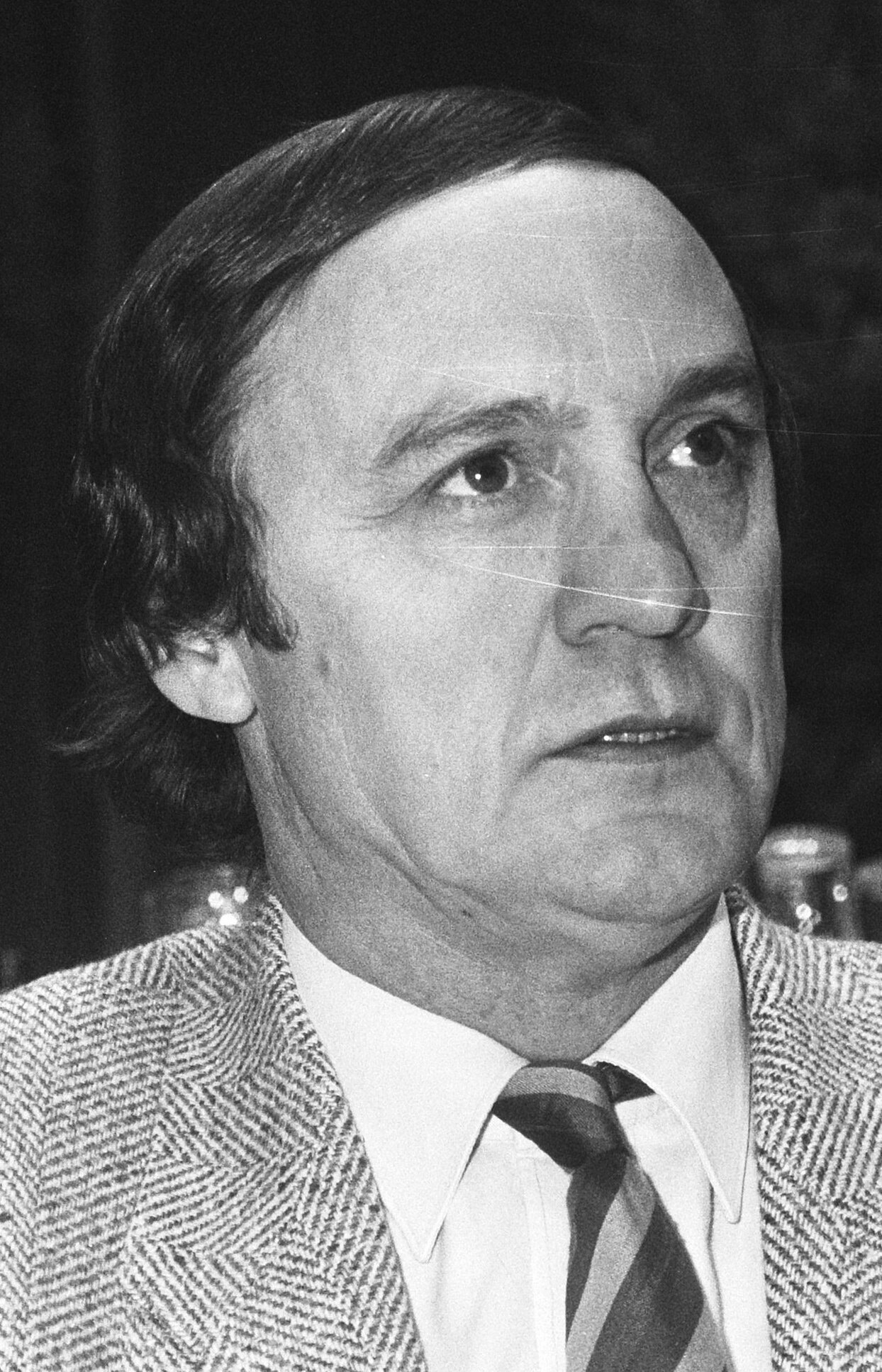

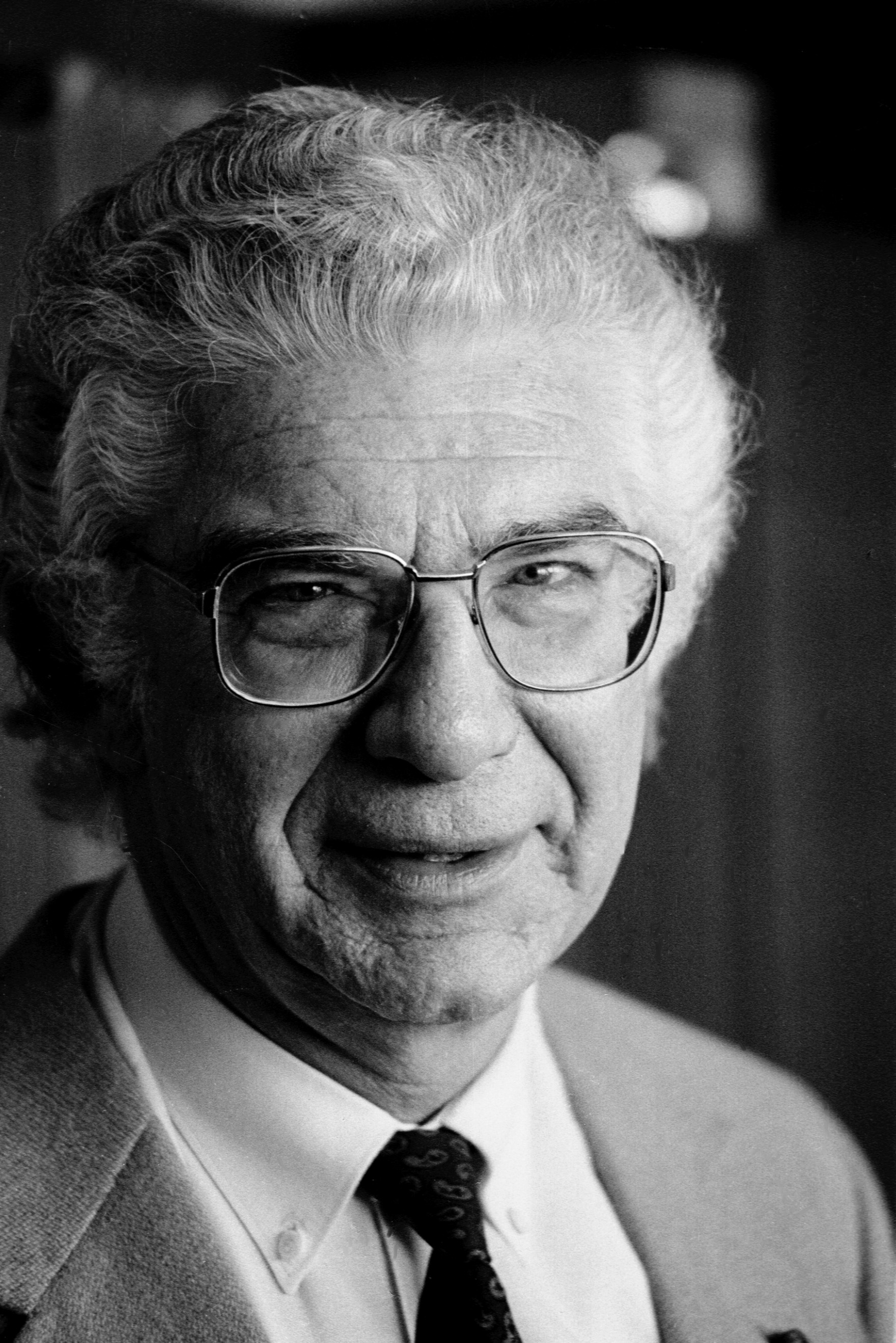
	First party	Second party
Leader	Leo Tindemans	Karel Van Miert
Party	CVP	Flemish Socialist Party
Alliance	EPP	PES
Seats won	7	3
Popular vote	1,607,941	698,889
Percentage	29.54%	12.84%
	Third party	Fourth party
Leader	Anne-Marie Lizin	Willy De Clercq
Party	PS	PVV-PLP
Alliance	PES	ALDE
Seats won	4	2
Popular vote	575,824	512,363
Percentage	10.58%	9.41%

Elections to the European Parliament were held in Belgium on 10 June 1979. The Dutch-speaking electoral college elected 13 MEPs and the French-speaking electoral college elected 11 MEPs.

== Results ==
Party	Votes	%	Seats
French-speaking electoral college
Socialist Party	575,824	27.43	4
Christian Social Party	445,912	21.24	3
Democratic Front of Francophones–Walloon Rally	414,603	19.75	2
Liberal Reformist Party	372,904	17.76	2
Ecolo	107,833	5.14	0
Communist Party of Belgium	106,023	5.05	0
Unity List of the New Left	22,187	1.06	0
Walloon Liberal Party–European Liberal Party	17,566	0.84	0
Belgian Progressive Party	9,704	0.46	0
All Power to the Workers	8,821	0.42	0
United Feminist Party	7,273	0.35	0
Revolutionary Workers' League	6,209	0.30	0
European Workers' Party	4,617	0.22	0
Total	2,099,476	100.00	11
Dutch-speaking electoral college
Christian People's Party	1,607,941	48.09	7
Flemish Socialist Party	698,889	20.90	3
Party for Freedom and Progress	512,363	15.32	2
People's Union	324,540	9.71	1
Agalev	77,986	2.33	0
Communist Party of Belgium	39,773	1.19	0
All Power to the Workers	36,602	1.09	–
Flemish People's Party	34,706	1.04	–
Revolutionary Workers' League	10,702	0.32	–
Total	3,343,502	100.00	13
Valid votes	5,442,978	87.61	
Invalid/blank votes	769,753	12.39	
Total votes	6,212,731	100.00	
Registered voters/turnout	6,800,584	91.36	
Source: Belgian Elections
