= Patsy Vatlet =

Belgian politician

Personal details
- Party: Flemish Interest

Patsy Vatlet is a Belgian politician who was elected as a Member of the European Parliament in 2019 but did not take her seat. She was replaced by Tom Vandendriessche.
