= Saïd El Khadraoui =

Belgian politician (born 1975)

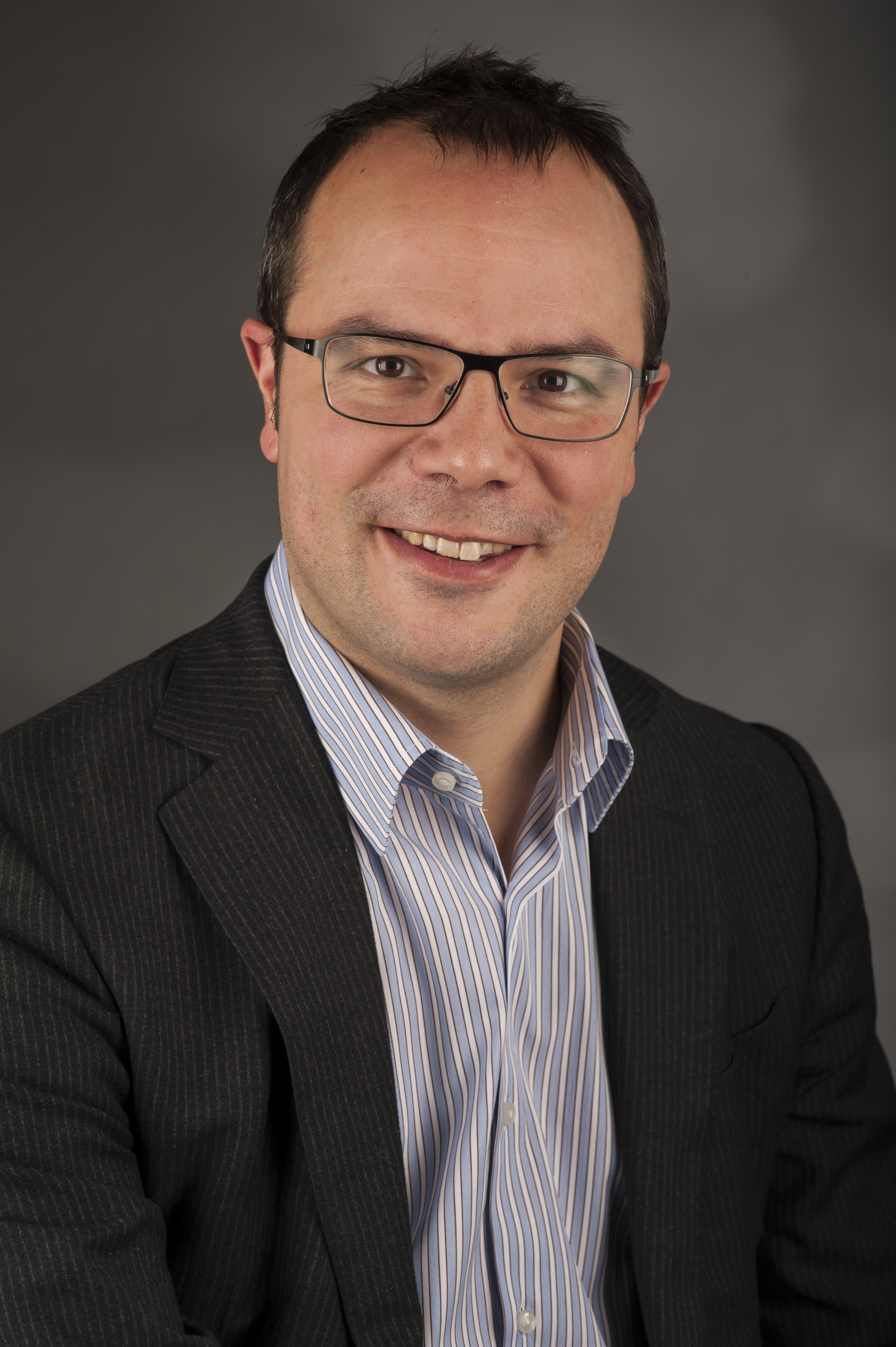
- Saïd El Khadraoui

Member of the European Parliament for the Dutch-speaking electoral college of Belgium
- Incumbent
- Assumed office 7 October 2003

Member of the Municipal Council of Leuven
- Incumbent
- Assumed office 1994

Personal details
- Born: 9 April 1975 (age 50) Leuven, Belgium
- Party: Party of European Socialists, Socialist Party – Different
- Website: website

Saïd El Khadraoui (born 9 April 1975) is a former Belgian politician and Member of the European Parliament for Belgium with the Socialist Party – Different, part of the Socialist Group and sat on the European Parliament's Committee on Transport and Tourism.

He was a substitute for the Committee on International Trade, a member of the Delegation to the EU-Armenia, EU-Azerbaijan and EU-Georgia Parliamentary Cooperation Committees and a substitute for the Delegation for relations with the United States.

== Personal life ==
El Khadraoui was born in Leuven, Belgium, to a Moroccan father and a Belgian mother.

== Education ==
- 1997: Degree in modern history (University of Leuven (KUL))
- 1998: Further academic training in international relations (KUL)

== Career ==
- 1998-1999: Worked in the office of the Deputy Prime Minister and Minister of Home Affairs
- 1999: Worked in the office of the Deputy Prime Minister and Minister for the Budget
- 1994-2018: Elected Member of the Leuven City Council
- 2001-2003: Alderman of the Leuven municipal government
- 2003-2014: Member of the European Parliament
- 2015-2020: Policy Adviser at the European Political Strategy Centre (European Commission)

== See also ==
- 2004 European Parliament election in Belgium
