= Paul Staes =

Belgian politician (1945–2024)

Member of the Senate of Belgium
- In office 12 July 1995 – 5 May 1999

Member of the European Parliament for the Dutch-speaking electoral college
- In office 24 July 1984 – 18 July 1994

Personal details
- Born: 3 December 1945 Berchem, Belgium
- Died: 13 November 2024 (aged 78) Schoten, Belgium
- Party: CVP; Agalev
- Occupation: Journalist

Paul Staes (3 December 1945 – 13 November 2024) was a Belgian politician of the Christian People's Party (CVP) and Agalev.

Staes served as a member of the European Parliament from 1984 to 1994 and was a senator from 1995 to 1999. He died in Schoten on 13 November 2024, at the age of 78.
