= Ralph Packet =

Belgian politician

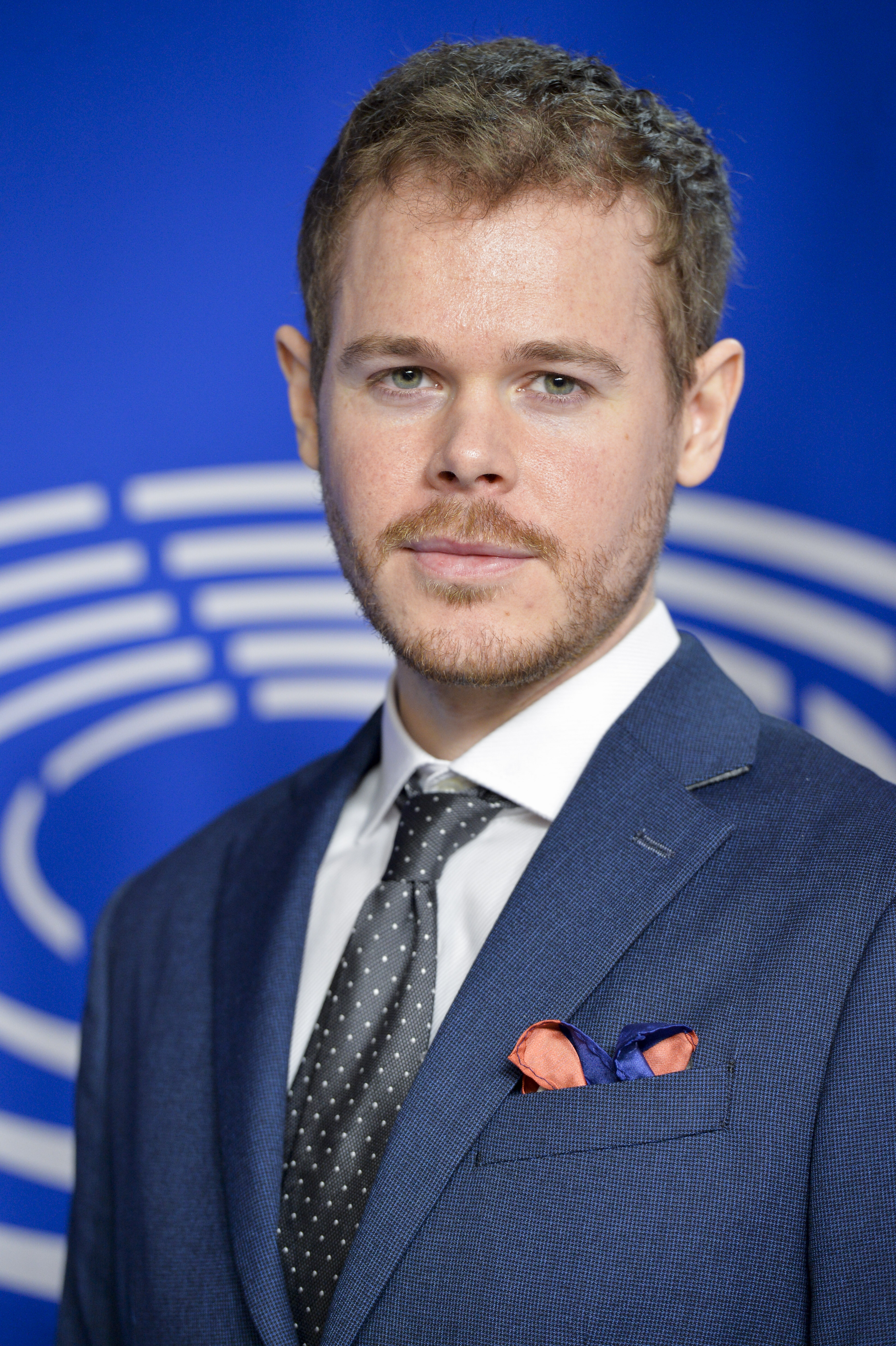
- Packet in 2018

Member of the European Parliament for Belgium
- In office 22 November 2018 – May 2019
- Preceded by: Sander Loones
- Parliamentary group: European Conservatives and Reformists

Personal details
- Born: 17 July 1990 (age 35) Etterbeek, Belgium
- Party: New Flemish Alliance

Ralph Packet (born 17 July 1990) is a Belgian politician from the New Flemish Alliance.
