= Johan Van Overtveldt =

Belgian politician

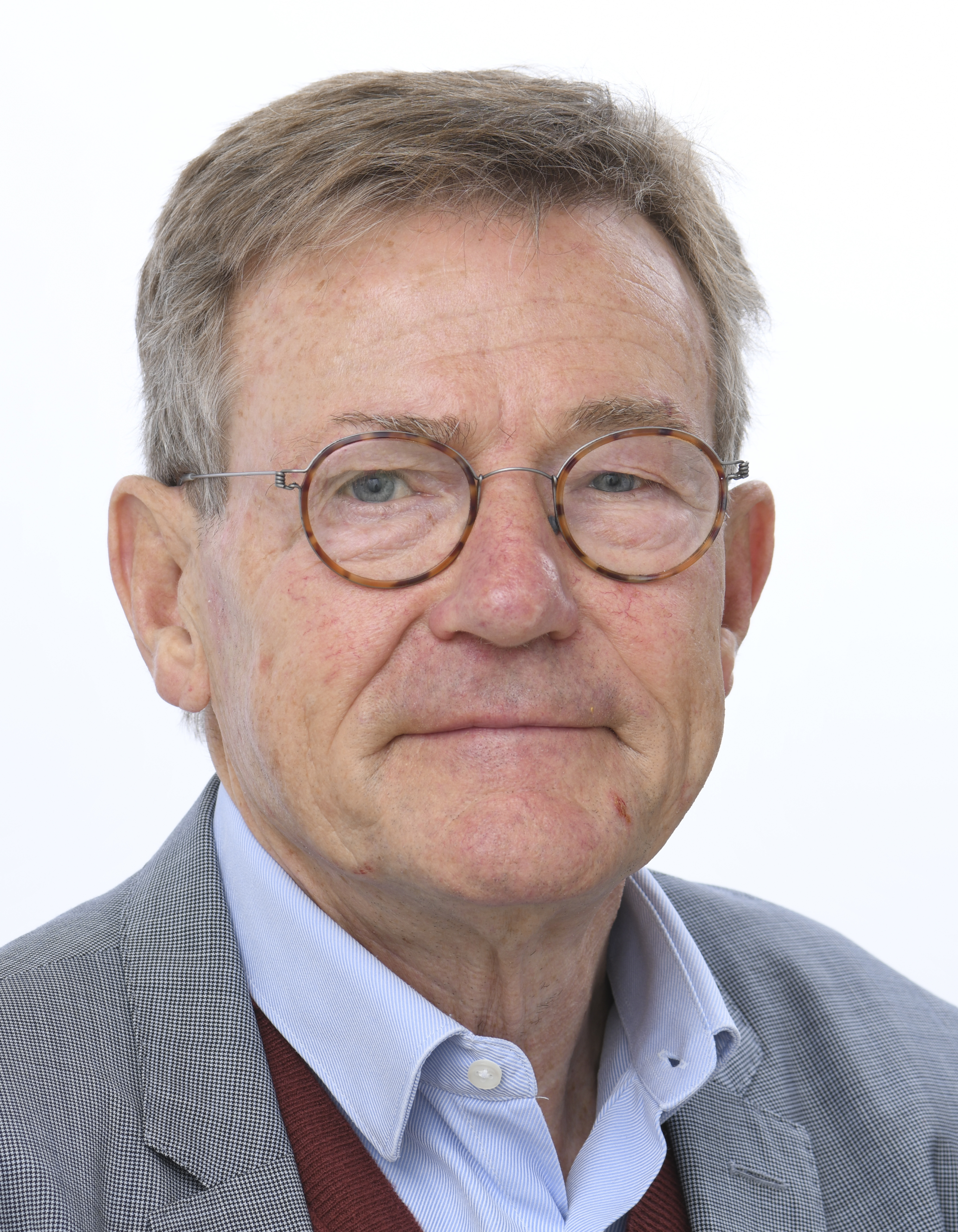
- Official portrait, 2024

Member of the European Parliament for Belgium
- Incumbent
- Assumed office 2 July 2019
- Constituency: Dutch-speaking electoral college

Minister of Finance
- In office 11 October 2014 – 9 December 2018
- Prime Minister: Charles Michel
- Preceded by: Koen Geens
- Succeeded by: Alexander De Croo

Personal details
- Born: 24 August 1955 (age 71) Mortsel, Belgium
- Party: New Flemish Alliance (2013–present)
- Education: Saint Ignatius University Centre

Johan Van Overtveldt (born 24 August 1955) is a Belgian journalist and politician of the New Flemish Alliance (N-VA). He served as Minister of Finance of Belgium from 2014 until 2018. He is currently a Member of the European Parliament since July 2024, where is serves as chair of the Budgetary committee.

== Career ==
He was the chief editor of Trends from 2010 to 2013 and chief editor of Knack from 2011 to 2012.

In 2012 he was awarded the Prize for Liberty by the Flemish classical-liberal think tank Libera!.

== Political career ==
In November 2013 Van Overtveldt switched over to politics, becoming a member of the New Flemish Alliance (N-VA). As main N-VA candidate for the 2014 European Parliament elections, he was elected as a member of the European Parliament.

Following the formation of the Michel Government in October 2014, Van Overtveldt became Minister of Finance in the government of Prime Minister Charles Michel; Sander Loones succeeded him as member of the European Parliament.

Since the 2019 elections, Van Overtveldt has been a member of the European Parliament, where he has been chairing the Parliament's Committee on Budgets. In addition, he is a member of the Committee on Economic and Monetary Affairs. In this capacity, he is the Parliament's rapporteur on the Multiannual Financial Framework for 2021–2027.

Van Overtveldt was re-elected in May 2024.

== Other activities ==
=== European Union organizations ===
- European Investment Bank (EIB), Ex-Officio Member of the Board of Governors (2014-2018)
- European Stability Mechanism, Member of the Board of Governors (2014-2018)

=== International organizations ===
- African Development Bank (AfDB), Ex-Officio Alternate Member of the Board of Governors (2014-2018)
- Asian Development Bank (ADB), Ex-Officio Member of the Board of Governors (2014-2018)
- European Bank for Reconstruction and Development (EBRD), Ex-Officio Member of the Board of Governors (2014-2018)
- Inter-American Investment Corporation (IIC), Ex-Officio Member of the Board of Governors (2014-2018)
- International Monetary Fund (IMF), Ex-Officio Alternate Member of the Board of Governors (2014-2018)
- Joint World Bank-IMF Development Committee, Member (2014-2018)
- Multilateral Investment Guarantee Agency (MIGA), World Bank Group, Ex-Officio Member of the Board of Governors (2014-2018)
- World Bank, Ex-Officio Member of the Board of Governors (2014-2018)

== Publications ==
- Het einde van de Euro
- Maandag geen economie meer?
- The Chicago School: How the University of Chicago Assembled the Thinkers Who Revolutionized Economics and Business
- Bernanke's test

Political offices
Preceded by Koen Geens	Minister of Finance; 2014–2018	Succeeded by Alexander De Croo
