= Rika De Backer =

Belgian politician (1923–2002)

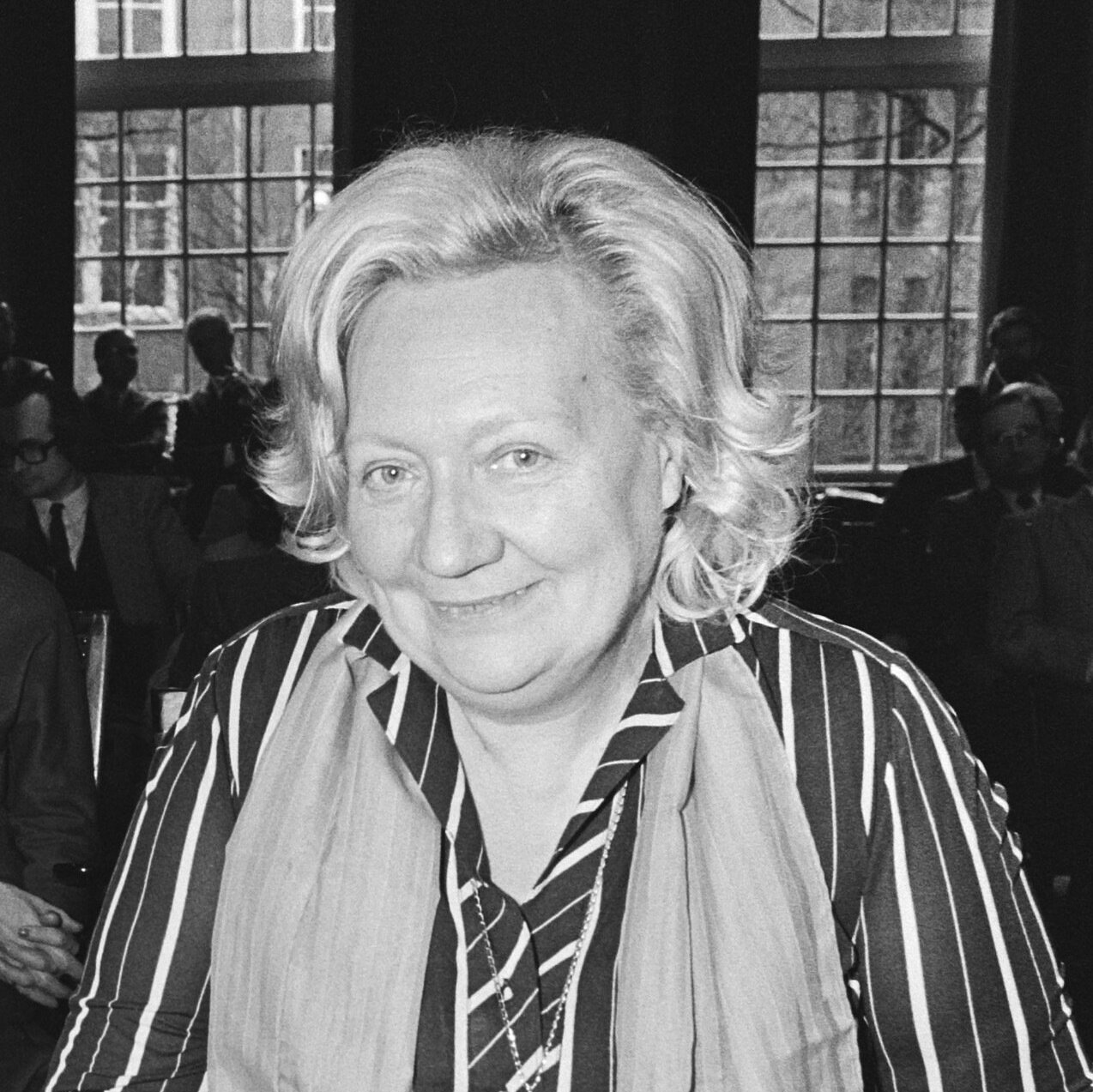

Minister of Culture
- In office 24 April 1974 – 1981
- Succeeded by: Karel Poma

Personal details
- Born: 1 February 1923 Antwerp
- Died: 6 May 2002 (aged 79) Weert, Netherlands
- Party: Christian People's Party
- Spouse: Herman De Backer
- Children: 7

Rika De Backer, also known as Rika De Backer-Van Ocken, (1923 – 2002) was a Belgian conservative politician. Being a member of the Christian People's Party she was the minister of culture from 1974 to 1981. She also served at the European Parliament between 1984 and 1989.

== Early life and education ==
De Becker was born in Antwerp on 1 February 1923. She obtained a degree in history in 1944.

== Career and activities ==
Following World War II De Backer joined the Catholic Workers Women's Guilds where she involved in activities to promote women's suffrage. She was a member of the Christian People's Party. Her political career began in 1968 when she became vice chair of the party's Antwerp branch.

De Backer was appointed minister of culture and Flemish affairs on 24 April 1974 to the first cabinet of Leo Tindemans, being the first Belgian woman to hold a ministerial post. In this capacity she founded the Flemish Cultural Center in Amsterdam. She remained in office until late 1981 and was replaced by Karel Poma in the post. She named as the state secretary for the Flemish community in 1979. De Backer continued to serve in the post in the cabinet led by Prime Minister Gaston Eyskens between April and December 1981.

De Backer also served as a senator between 1971 and 1984. She was elected to the European Parliament in 1984 being part of the European People's Party and served there until 1989. She also headed the Agence de Coopération Technique or the Flemish development agency.

== Personal life, death and legacy ==
De Backer married Herman De Backer with whom she had seven children. She died of liver cancer in Weert on 6 May 2002.

One of the streets in Antwerp is named after Rika De Backer.
