= Koenraad Dillen =

Belgian politician

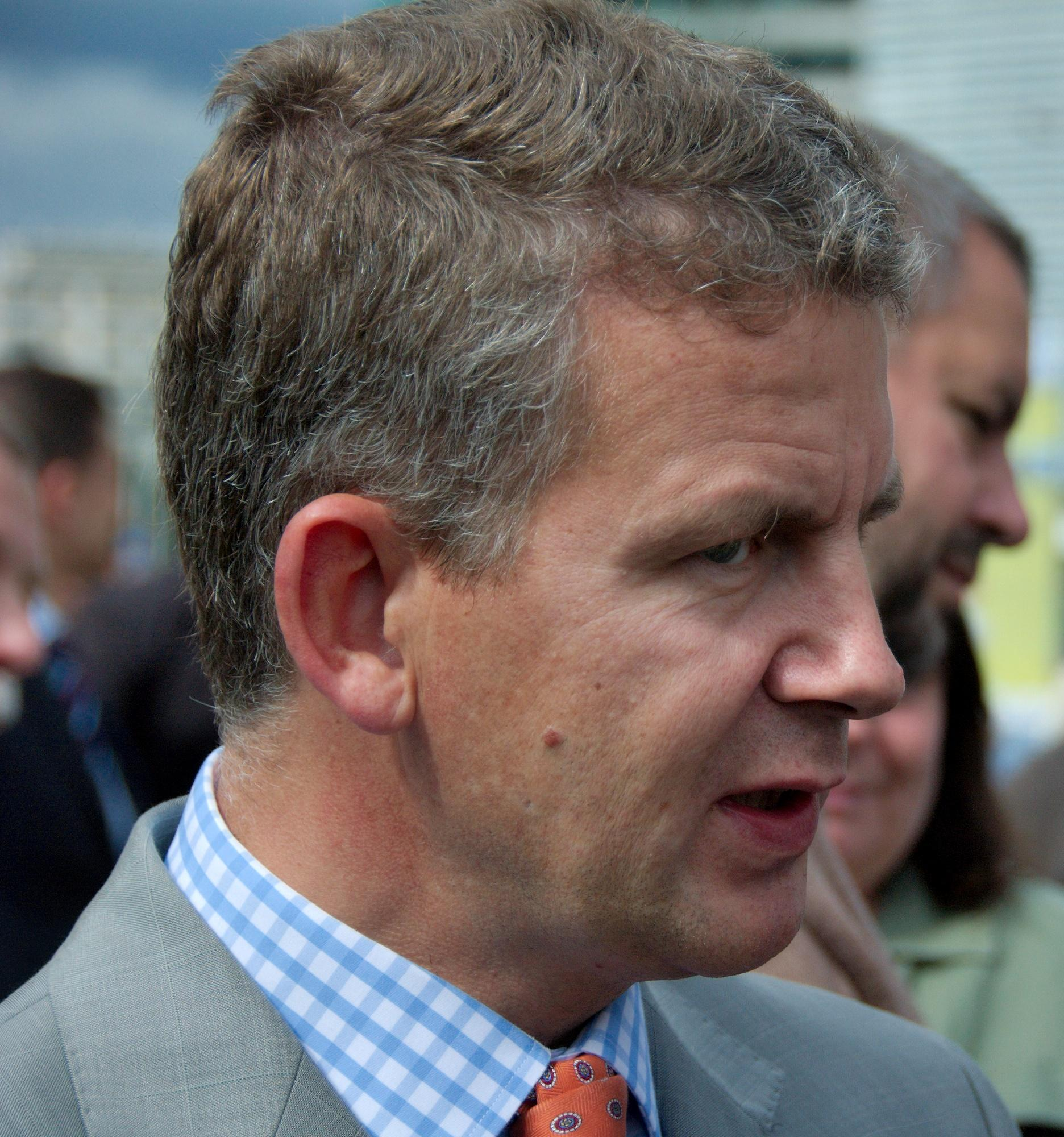
- Koenraad Dillen
- Born: 6 November 1964 (age 61); Mortsel, Belgium
- Occupation: politician

Koenraad Francine Gaston "Koen" Dillen (born 6 November 1964) is a Belgian politician and a former Member of the European Parliament (MEP) for Flanders with the Vlaams Belang, sitting in the Identity, Tradition, Sovereignty group in the European Parliament. He is the son of Karel Dillen, founder of the Vlaams Blok.

He sat on its Committee on Development, and was a substitute for the Committee on Civil Liberties, Justice and Home Affairs and a member of the Delegation to the ACP-EU Joint Parliamentary Assembly.

== Education ==
- 1987: Degree in translation

== Career ==
- 1989–1990: French teacher
- 1990–1992: Account manager, Rank Xerox
- 1992–1994: Senior official, Belgian Parliament
- 1994–2003: Civil servant
- since 2000: Municipal Councillor
- 2003–2014: Member of the European Parliament

== See also ==
- 2004 European Parliament election in Belgium
