= Patsy Sörensen =

Belgian politician and social activist

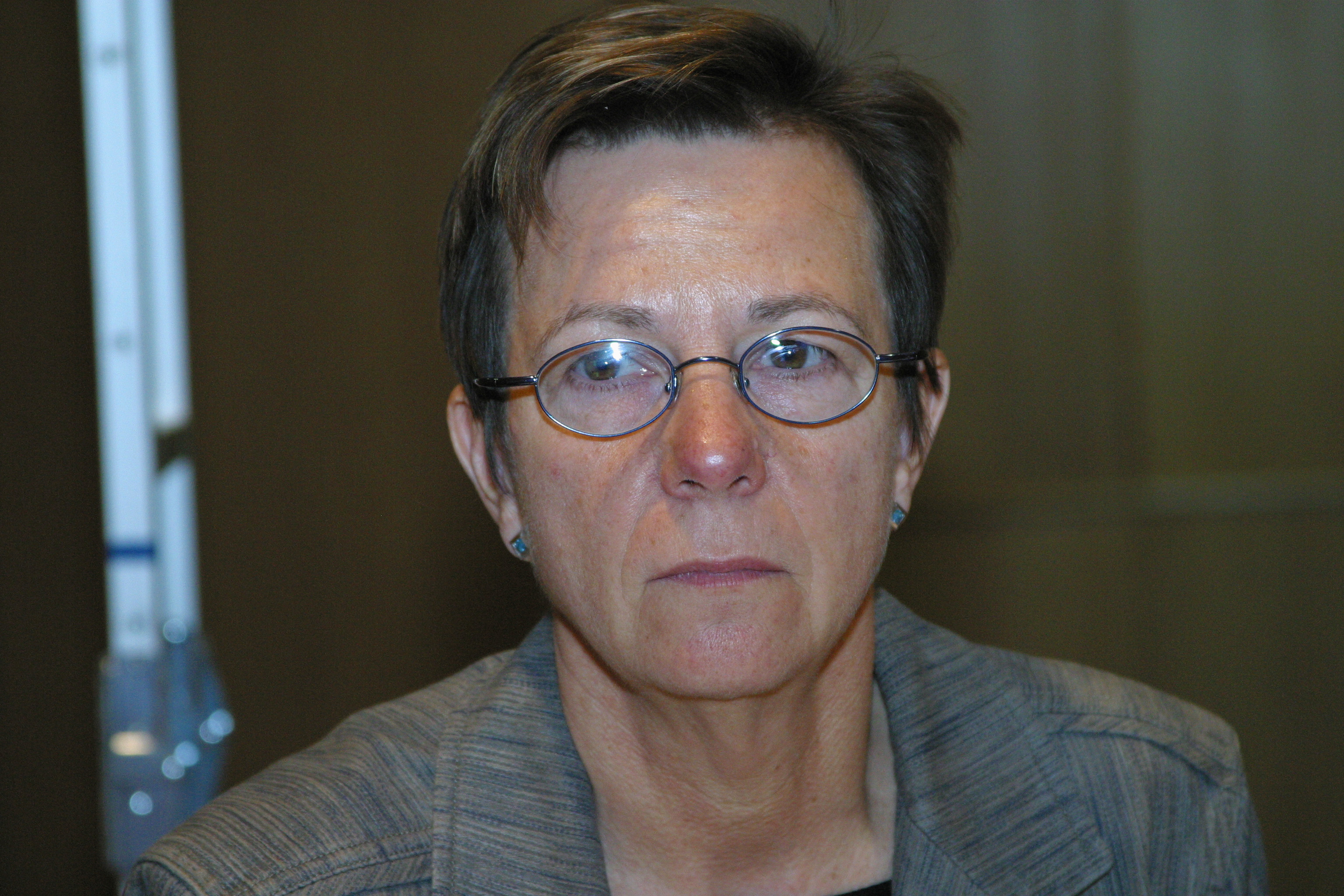

Personal details
- Born: 1 October 1952 (age 73) Antwerp, Belgium

Patsy Sörensen (born 1 October 1952) is a Belgian politician and social activist. She was a member of the European Parliament from 1999 to 2004, aligned with the Greens–European Free Alliance.

She was born in Antwerp and worked as an art teacher before entering politics. She served on Antwerp's municipal council before being elected to the European parliament.

She was one of the founders of the non-governmental organization Payoke, which provides support for prostitutes and victims of human trafficking. She later became director of Payoke.
