= Hilde Vautmans =

Belgian politician

Hilde Vautmans MEP
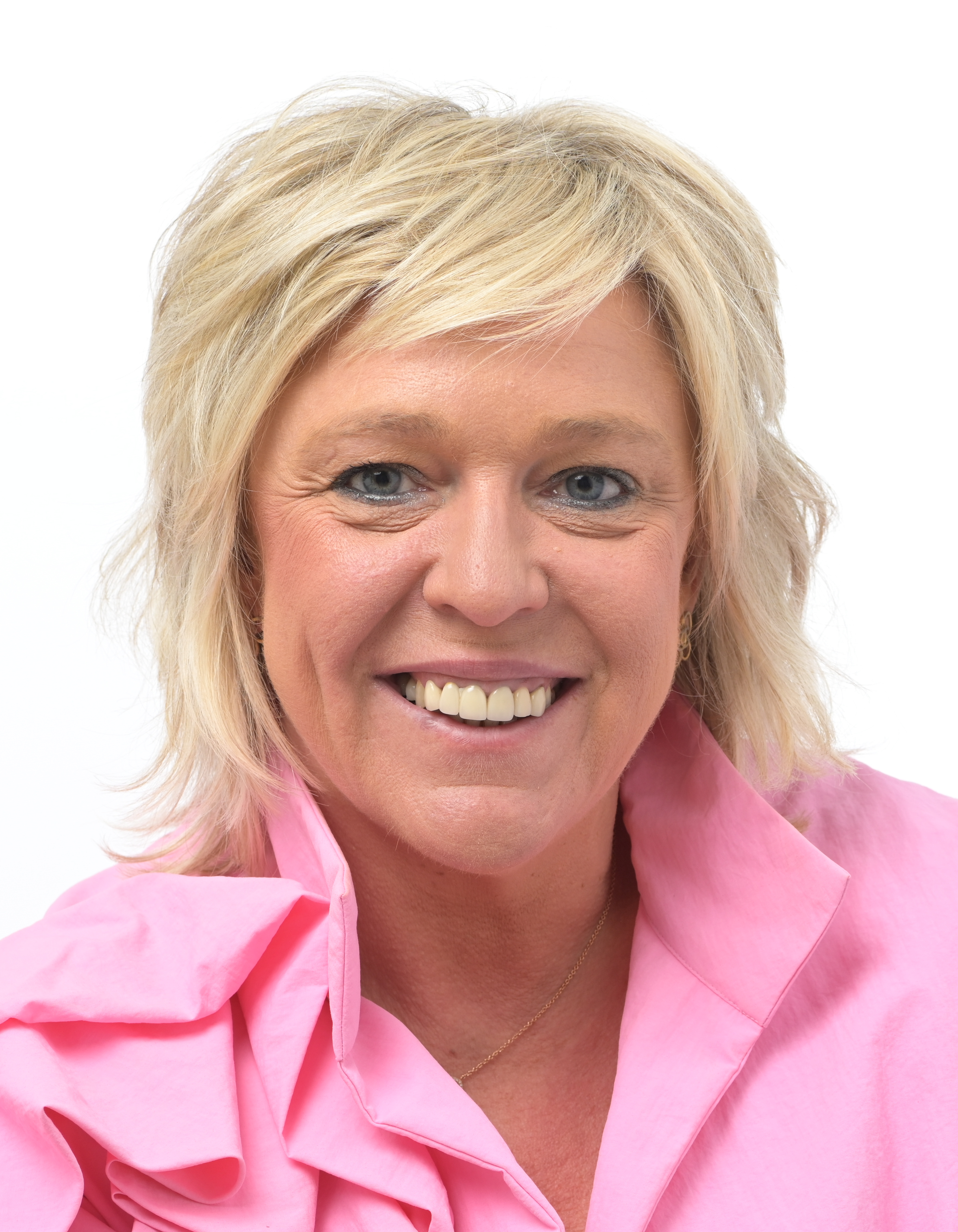
- Official portrait, 2024

Member of the European Parliament
- Incumbent
- Assumed office 1 January 2015
- Preceded by: Annemie Neyts-Uyttebroeck
- Constituency: Dutch-speaking electoral college of Belgium

Personal details
- Born: 2 May 1972 (age 54) Sint-Truiden, Belgium
- Party: Anders
- Occupation: Politician

Hilde Vautmans (born 2 May 1972) is a Belgian politician of Anders (formerly Open Flemish Liberals and Democrats) who has been serving as a Member of the European Parliament since January 2015, representing the Dutch-speaking electoral college of Belgium.

Vautmans served as assistant to both senator Valère Vautmans, her uncle, and senator Stef Goris. She subsequently worked in the cabinet of Prime Minister Guy Verhofstadt, and helped him with legalising same-sex marriage in Belgium.

She was elected President of the European Liberal Forum in September 2020.

== Political career ==
=== Member of the Belgian Parliament, 2003–2010 ===
Vautmans served in the Belgian Chamber of Representatives from 2003 to 2010. She chaired the Committee on Foreign Affairs from September 2007 to July 2009 and was Open Vld group leader from July 2009 to June 2010. She was not re-elected in 2010.

=== Member of the European Parliament, 2014–present ===
Vautmans became Member of the European Parliament as successor to Annemie Neyts-Uyttebroeck, who resigned at the end of 2014. In the European Parliament, Vautmans is member of the Committee on Foreign Affairs (AFET) and the Subcommittee on Security and Defence (SEDE).

In addition to her committee assignments, Vautmans is a member of the delegation for relations with the NATO Parliamentary Assembly. Since 2021, she has been part of the Parliament's delegation to the EU-UK Parliamentary Assembly, which provides parliamentary oversight over the implementation of the EU–UK Trade and Cooperation Agreement.

Vautmans is also a member of the European Parliament Intergroup on LGBT Rights; the Elie Wiesel Network of Parliamentarians for the Prevention of Genocide and Mass Atrocities and against Genocide Denial; the MEPs Against Cancer group; and the MEP Horse Group.

Following the 2019 elections, Vautmans was part of a cross-party working group in charge of drafting the European Parliament's four-year work program on foreign policy.

In September 2022, Vautmans was the recipient of the Economic, Monetary Affairs, Tax and Budget Award at The Parliament Magazine's annual MEP Awards.

Vautmans is also active in local politics in Sint-Truiden and previously in Hasselt.

== Political positions ==
In 2020, Vautmans and Katalin Cseh initiated an open letter, in which a group of 23 members of the Renew Europe group called on Josep Borrell to push for coordinated sanctions targeted at Chinese leaders and officials responsible for human rights violations in the Xinjiang re-education camps and in Hong Kong.

In a joint letter initiated by Norbert Röttgen and Anthony Gonzalez ahead of the 47th G7 summit in 2021, Vautmans joined some 70 legislators from Europe, the US and Japan in calling upon their leaders to take a tough stance on China and to "avoid becoming dependent" on the country for technology including artificial intelligence and 5G.
