= Tom Vandendriessche =

Belgian politician

Tom Vandendriessche MEP
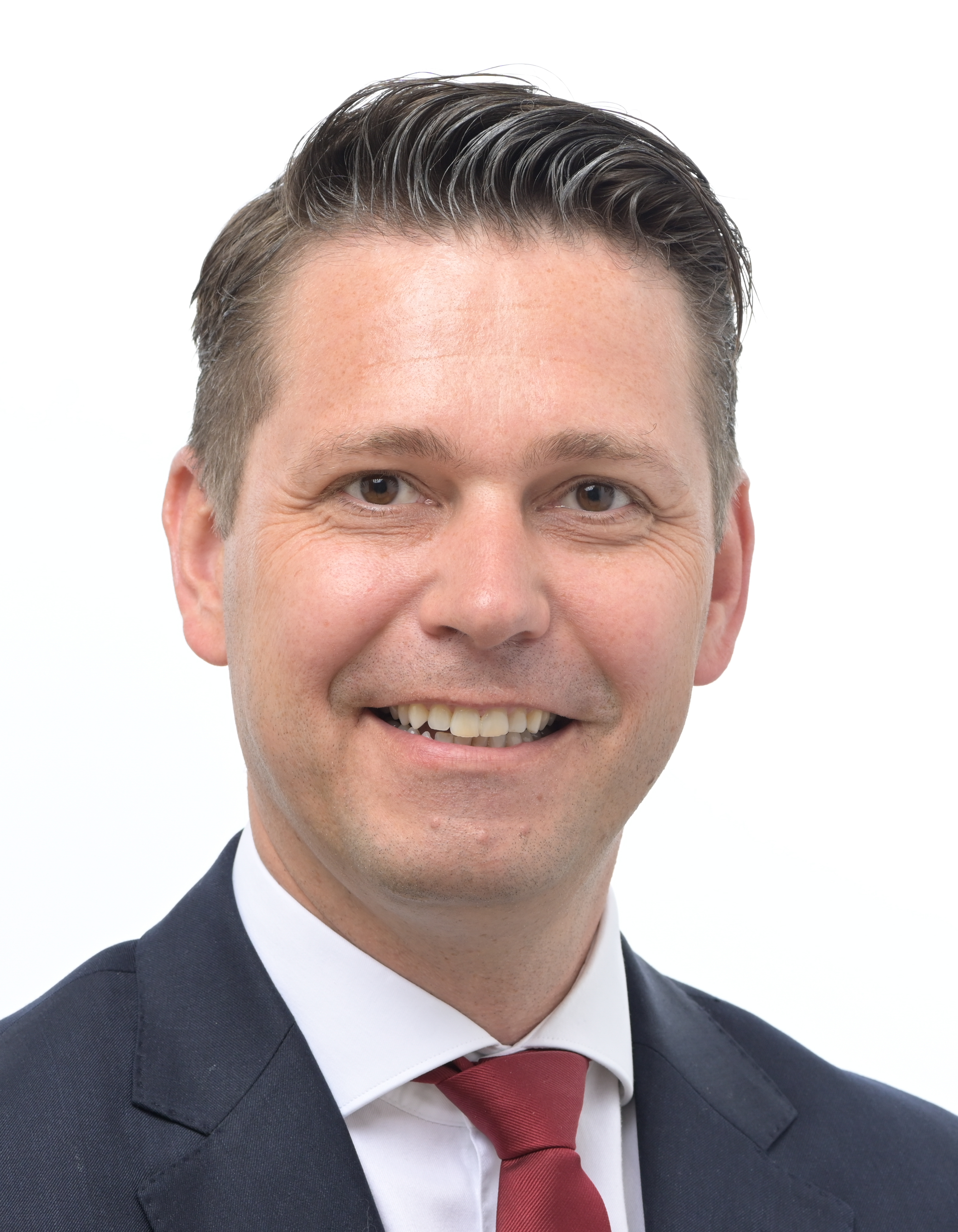
- Official portrait, 2024

Member of the European Parliament for Belgium
- Incumbent
- Assumed office 2 July 2019
- Constituency: Dutch-speaking electoral college

Personal details
- Born: 27 October 1978 (age 47) Leuven, Belgium
- Party: Vlaams Belang
- Education: Ghent University
- Occupation: Politician, business analyst

Tom Vandendriessche (born 27 October 1978) is a Belgian politician and businessman currently serving as a Member of the European Parliament for the Vlaams Belang.

== Studies ==
Vandendriessche holds a master's degree in political sciences and a master's degree in business economics from Ghent University, where he was active as a student leader of the catholic and Flemish-national student organisation KVHV-Ghent.

== Career ==
After his studies, he became a management trainee at Katoen Natie and business process engineer for the MOD-services of the Flemish Government, followed by a role as an employee in the quality assurance service of Hogeschool Gent and business analyst with Kind en Gezin. He became internal auditor at Audio in 2013, changing to the role of external auditor for the Flanders Audit Authority in 2014. From 2014 to 2015 he was also managing director of the firm Verwarmslimmer.be, which won the title of "Start Up of the Year" at the UNIZO East-Flanders-awards in 2015.

== Political career ==
Involved in the political Flemish movement since his youth, Vandendriessche became a member of the right-wing Vlaams Blok and Vlaams Blok Jongeren in 1993. In 2016 he became spokesman and press attaché for the Europe of Nations and Freedom group in the European Parliament. In 2019, he was elected MEP for his party, Vlaams Belang, winning 69.000 preference votes, taking over from Patsy Vatlet who chose not to take up her mandate as MEP. Since 2020 Vandendriessche is also part of the party bureau of Vlaams Belang. Vandendriessche was re-elected as MEP in June 2024, almost quadrupling his score by winning 318.151 preferential votes. Following the june 2024 European election, he took over the role of head of the Vlaams Belang-delegation in the European Parliament, which is a member of the Patriots for Europe.

In 2000, Vandendriessche was involved in an incident between Vlaams Blok supporters and left-wing militants in the Ghent student district, in which Vandendriessche kicked a left-wing militant several times. In the first instance he was sentenced to one month in prison and a fine for assault and battery. This ruling was overturned by the Court of appeal, he was given suspension of sentence. This means that the judge considers the facts proven, but suspends the conviction. However, he had to compensate for a tear in a jacket.

== Political positions ==
=== Migration ===
Vandendriessche is known to be a very vocal critic of the European migration pact. According to him, this pact does not serve the gola of limiting illegal migration, but transforms migration previously deemed illegal in legalised migration, creating a pull effect on mass migration. In this context, he used the controversial term omvolking to describe the demographic shift as a result of migration, based on the quote of European Commissioner Ylva Johansson, who claimed that the EU needs a million new migrants per year. Furthermore, Vandendriessche sees migration treaties such as the Global Compact on Migration or the European migrationpact as a way to loosen migration policies through judicial activism and soft law without democratic interference. He is a strong proponent of strict migration policies, also limiting migrant labour, and a Belgian withdrawal from the European Pact on Migration and Asylum.

As an advocate of the 'Fortress Europe'§plan of Vlaams Belang, he pleads for a reform of the European migration policy as to treat applications for protection and migration outside of European borders and to exclude illegal migrants from the right of legal residence. He is also known to be a proponent of push backs. Vandendriessche is opposed to the Australian migration model since it would facilitate mass migration in terms of legal migrant labour. As a solution to the demographic and economical challenges of the future, he proposes investments in education, infrastructure, technology and innovation combined with a family-friendly government policy.

=== Economics ===
As one of the key planners of the political strategy of Vlaams Belang since 2020, Vandendriessche played a major role in the political position of the party as a clear centrist force on the economical scale in 2023-24. The party opted for a clear choice for the Rhinelandmodel, promoting a free market economy with social corrections. The strategy is focused on incentivising work and entrepreneurship with governmental support on a strategic and social level. A lowering of labour taxes and an increase of the tax-free income combined with closing off social security for non-contributing new migrants is promoted as a 'new social pact'. Vandendriessche proposes lowering the economical and sociocultural cost of migration by drastically lowering migration to Europe.

As a self-styled nationalist, Vandendriessche is opposed to labour migration, citing it as a source of mass migration, and promotes innovation, automatisation, digitalisation and family friendly policies as a solution to current economical and demographical challenges. As a member of the European parliament het is opposed to globalist trends and places a nationalist solution based on strategical independence, local attachment and a strict migration policy.

=== Agriculture and climate ===
As a member of the European parliament, Vandendriessche supported the European farmers protests of 2023 and 2024 against the European Green Deal. According to Vandendriessche, the Green Deal would force European farmers to take measures to meet impossible demands, forcefully decimating the agricultural sector to attain a greener economy. The liberalisation of international competition by means of treaties such as Mercosur are also met with critic by Vandendriessche. He cites innovative technological solutions to counter nitrogen emissions in the sector without damaging it. Vandendriessche is one of the proponents of a motion of a resolution on the European Green Deal, calling for a broader civil discourse on the topic.

=== Culture ===
Vandendriessche is known as a vehement adversary of the woke movement and was one of the organisers of a European conference on woke in 2023. He claims the woke movement to be a polarising threat to the rule of law and equality of citizens, creating a new hierarchy of rights and privileges, discriminating against the majority population. In his work and writing, Vandendriessche styles himself as a staunch defender of European cultural heritage and traditions. He points to renaming or outright banning christian and traditional symbols and feasts as a woke attack which mussed be pushed back. Opposing woke, Vandendriessche supports a policy of absolute equality and a clear policy on freedom of speech, claiming that what is legal offline should also be legal online. In education, neutrality should be guaranteed by means of strengthening democratic control and penalising censorship in schools and universities. A commission on the subject as well as a censorship hotline should support these measures. Vandendriessche encourages the proposal of the creation of a scientific commission to guarantee academical liberty in universities, investigating claims of government interference or political bias. To this end, councils of said universities should be reformed to contain a proportional political representation.

== Publications ==
- Tom Vandendriessche, We komen eraan, 2024, Doorbraak
