= An Hermans =

Flemish politician (born 1944)

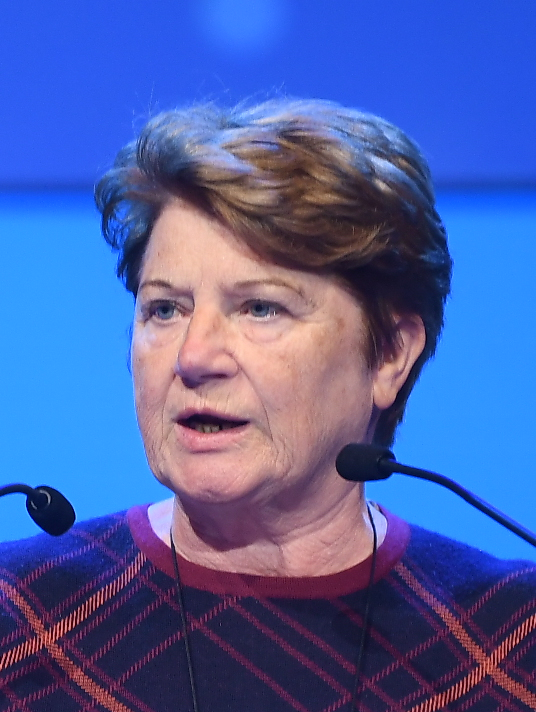

Professor Pedagogy at the KU Leuven
- In office 1986–2004

Member of the European Parliament
- In office 1989–1994

Belgian Representative
- In office 1995–1999

Provincial Councilor Flemish Brabant
- In office 2001–2018

President of the Provincial Council Flemish Brabant
- In office 2013–2015

President European Seniors' Union
- In office 2013–2023

Personal details
- Born: Anna Hermans; 23 September 1944 (age 82) Heusden-Zolder, Belgium
- Party: CD&V
- Education: KU Leuven
- Occupation: Politician

An Hermans (born 23 September 1944) is a Belgian Christian Democrat politician for the CVP and its successor CD&V. She is also an emeritus professor at the KU Leuven.

== Life history ==
An Hermans was the eldest daughter in a mining family of six children. She was educated at the Heilig Hartinstituut in Heverlee, where she obtained her teachers degree in 1963. After teaching for three years, she continued her studies at the KU Leuven, where she graduated in 1971 as a licenciate in the Pedagogy. In 1978 she got a doctorate in this discipline.

Hermans started her academic career as a full-time academic researcher at the KU Leuven. From 1986 to 2004, she was professor of pedagogy at the same university. In that capacity she was author or co-author of several publications.

She was also general secretary of the Christian Workers' Women's Guild (KAV) from 1987 to 1989 and chairwoman of various advisory bodies in the educational and social-economical sectors.

In 1989 she was elected to the European Parliament for the CVP, which she remained until 1994, and in 1995 she became a member of the Belgian federal Chamber of Representatives for the Leuven district, which she remained until 1999. She then served as provincial councillor for Flemish Brabant from 2001 to 2018. From 2006 to 2012, she was group chairman for the CD&V in the Flemish Brabant provincial council. From 2013 to 2016, she was president of this provincial council.

Throughout her career, she advocated for women's rights in both the political sphere and her professional life.

Moreover, she was president of the Seniors’ Group of the CD&V from 2007 to 2019. Since 2013, she has been president of the European Seniors' Union (ESU). In these positions, her focus in recent years has been on the rights of older people to live with dignity and independence, elimination of age discrimination and participation in all sectors of social life. Digital literacy is necessary in this regard. At the request of the Council of Europe, she wrote 'The digital Era? Also my era!" which is available in seven languages.

== Recent Publications ==
- Hermans, A. The digital Era? Also my Era, Edition Information Society Department, Council of Europe (2022)
- Hermans, A. Das digitale Zeitalter? Auch ich gehöre dazu, Ausgabe Abteilung Informationsgesellschaft, Europarat (2022)
