= Freddy Willockx =

Belgian politician (1947–2024)

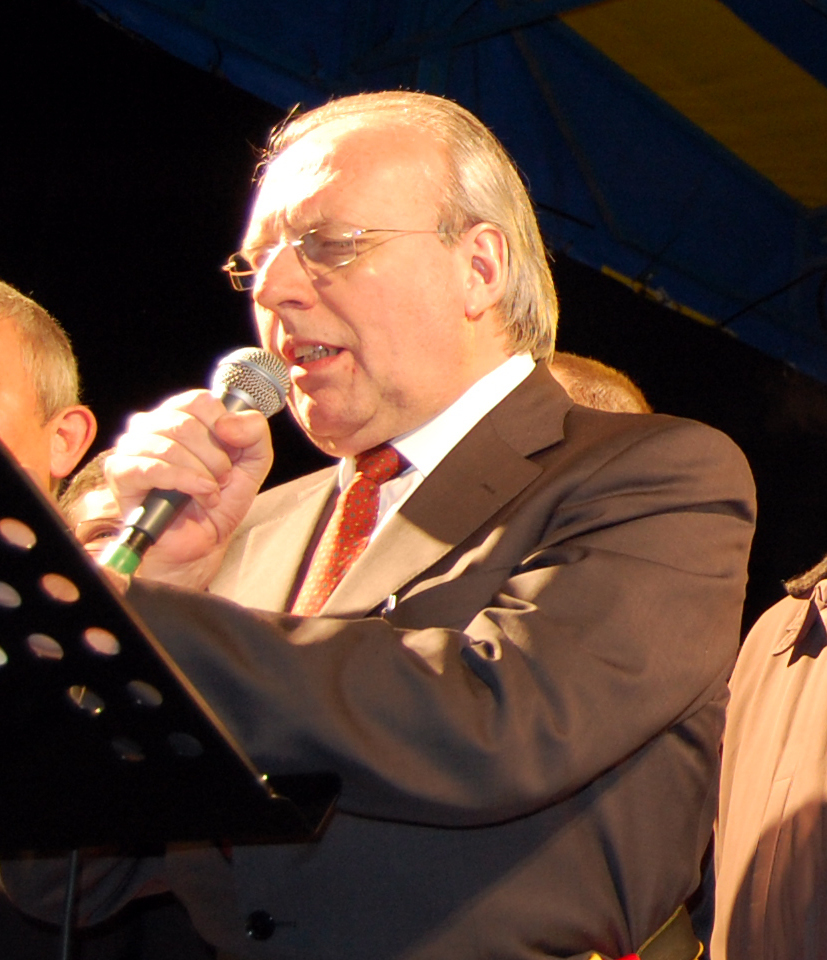
- Willockx in 2007
- Born: 2 September 1947; Sint-Niklaas, Belgium
- Died: 15 June 2024 (aged 76)
- Occupation: Politician

Frederik A. A. Willockx (2 September 1947 – 15 June 2024) was a Belgian socialist politician, and member of the Flemish Different Socialist Party.

Freddy Willockx was first elected to the Belgian Chamber of Representatives in 1979 and served until 1994. He served as state secretary for finances in 1980 and as minister of post, telephony and telegraph services from 1980 to 1981 and from 1988 to 1989. He served as minister of pensions 1992–1994. He was elected a Member of the European Parliament (1994–1999). In June 1999 he was elected again to the Chamber of Representatives but resigned in July when he was appointed special government commissioner for the handling of the Dioxin Affair and for the implementation of European Directives (1999–2001). He was named as minister of state in 2002.

Willockx served as mayor of Sint-Niklaas from 1989 to 1995 and once again from 2001 to 2010, when he retired. Willockx died on 15 June 2024, at the age of 76.
