= Nelly Maes =

Belgian politician (born 1941)

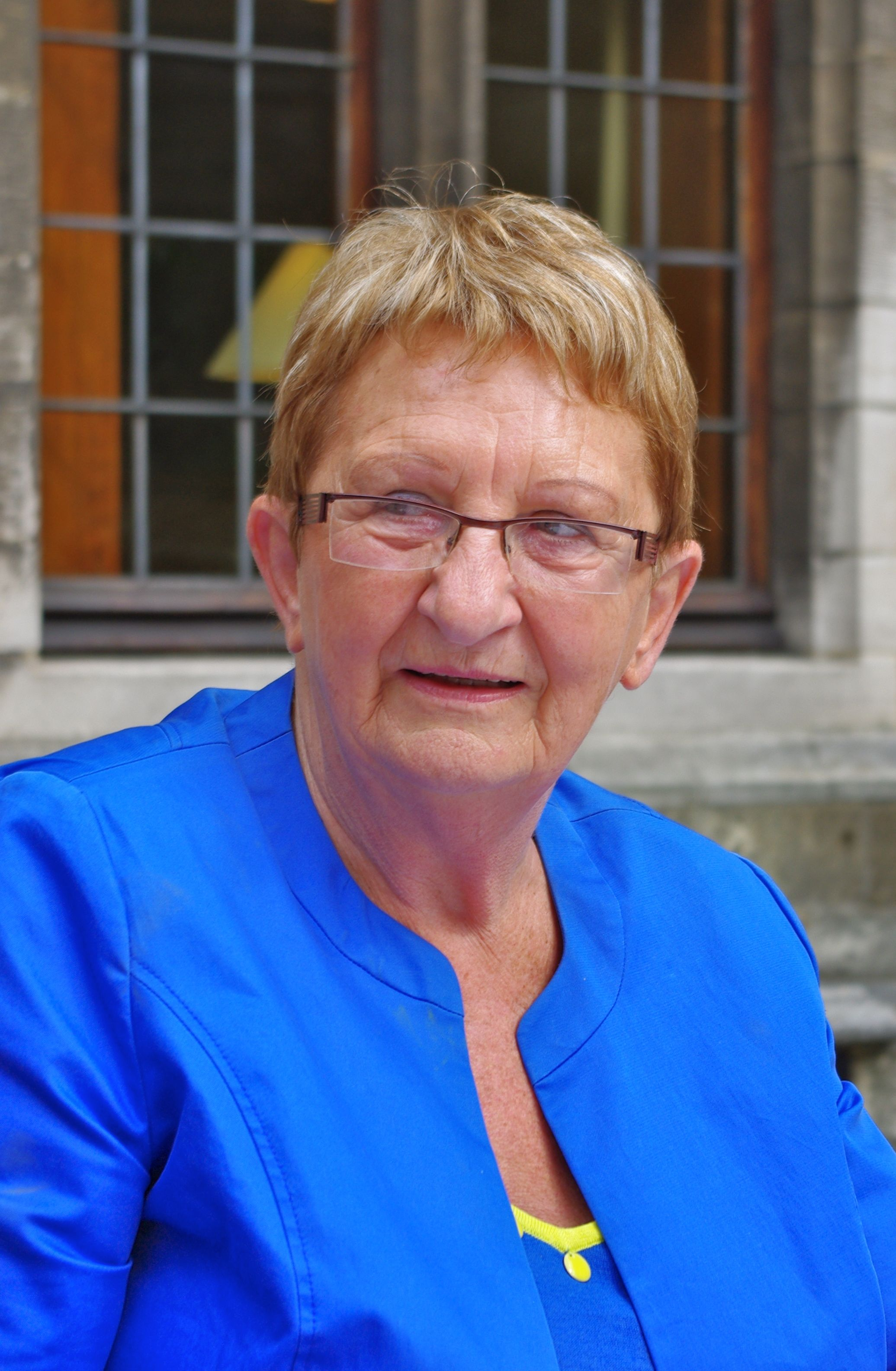
- Born: 25 February 1941 (age 85); Sinaai, Belgium
- Occupation: Politician

Nelly Maes (born 25 February 1941) is a Belgian social liberal politician from Flanders.

She began her professional career as a teacher. Her professional political career started in 1971 when, on behalf of Hugo Schiltz, she was stood candidate and was elected for the Volksunie into the Belgian Chamber of People's Representatives, where she seated until 1977, becoming an elected senator in the next year, 1978, until 1981. Upon being elected as vice-president of the party, she left parliamentary work, as the Volksunie went through rough seas internally, when separists and regionalists, leftists and conservatives, couldn't find a way to solve the problems concerning the whereabouts of the party which saw its political aims come true when the Belgian state deeply reformed itself from a unitarian state into a federation.

In 1985, she returned to her seat in the Belgian Chamber of People's Representatives, leaving there in 1991, again to continue in the Belgian Senate. But in 1995, she changed places and became a member of the newly formed Flemish Parliament until 1998, when elected into the European Parliament for the European Free Alliance.

In 2001, the Volksunie split, after which Maes, who was very much against the split, joined Spirit. Alliancepartner Sp.a put their own five favourable candidates on the highest places on the mutual election list for the European elections in 2004, Maes being sixth. Only five members were elected, so Maes is without a parlementary seat nowadays.

However, she was appointed as the president of the European Free Alliance, and as president of the Flemish Peace Institute, an organisation closely related to the Flemish Parliament.

Maes always stood firm for regional culturalism, regional languages, the environment, and women's liberation, the source of being called "Red Nelly".
