= Marijke Van Hemeldonck =

Belgian feminist and politician (born 1931)

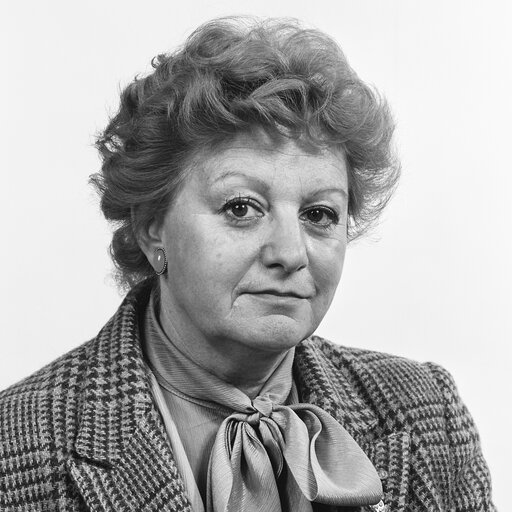

Member of the European Parliament
- In office 1982–1994

Personal details
- Born: Maria Van Hemeldonck; 23 December 1931 (age 94) Hove, Belgium
- Party: SP

Maria (Marijke) Van Hemeldonck (born 23 December 1931) is a Belgian feminist and former politician of the Belgian Socialist Party (SP).

== Career ==
Van Hemeldonck became a professional teacher, after which she went to work for the socialist trade union ABVV. Here she became chairman of the women's committee. From 1973 to 1974, she was also cabinet advisor to Minister of National Education Willy Calewaert and cabinet advisor at the Ministry of Labor and Employment, the ministry of the Brussels Region. Furthermore, from 1975 she was an expert at the Committee on Women's Labour, in 1973 she was rapporteur for the OECD as an expert on labor problems and in 1979, as a feminist on behalf of Belgium, she was part of the United Nations Commission on the Status of Women. She was also the president of the committee on the status of women at the 10th congress of the European Union of Socialist Parties of the EEC, asking for a gradual establishment of equality between the male and female European Parliament candidates.

Via the ABVV Van Hemeldonck ended up at the SP and became chairman of the party branch in Oudergem. She was also a member of the federal board of the SP in the Brussels Region. Before she was politically active with the SP, she was co-founder of the Red Lions in 1968, which defended the interests of the Flemish socialists in Brussels.

From 1982 to 1994, Van Hemeldonck was a member of the European Parliament, succeeding Marcel Colla.
