= Johan Van Hecke =

Belgian politician (born 1954)

Johan Jozef Marie Clara Van Hecke (born 2 December 1954 in Ghent) is a Belgian politician and Member of the European Parliament for Flanders with the Vlaamse Liberalen en Democraten, part of the Alliance of Liberals and Democrats for Europe and sits on the European Parliament's Committee on International Trade.

He is also a member of the Delegation to the ACP-EU Joint Parliamentary Assembly and a substitute for the Delegation for relations with South Africa.

He is married to Els De Temmerman, a journalist and activist who established vzw Childsoldiers, an organization that works for the rehabilitation of child soldiers in Africa. He lives in Oosterzele.

== Education ==
- 1978: Degree in medical sociology

== Career ==
- 1978-1980: Assistant at the faculty of sociology, Catholic University of Louvain
- 1980-1983: Head of research department and lecturer at the HIPB (Higher Institute for the Paramedical Professions), Ghent
- 1983-1986: National Chairman of the Youth CVP
- 1993-1996: General Chairman of the CVP
- 1997-1999: Director of EPP training institute in South Africa
- 1983-1988: Member of the Oosterzele Municipal Council
- 1989-1997: Mayor of Oosterzele
- 2001: Member of Ostend Municipal Council
- 1985-1997: Member of the House of Representatives
- 1991-1993: Leader of the parliamentary CVP, House of Representatives
- since 1999: Member of the European Parliament

== See also ==
- 2004 European Parliament election in Belgium
