= Frank Vanhecke =

Belgian politician

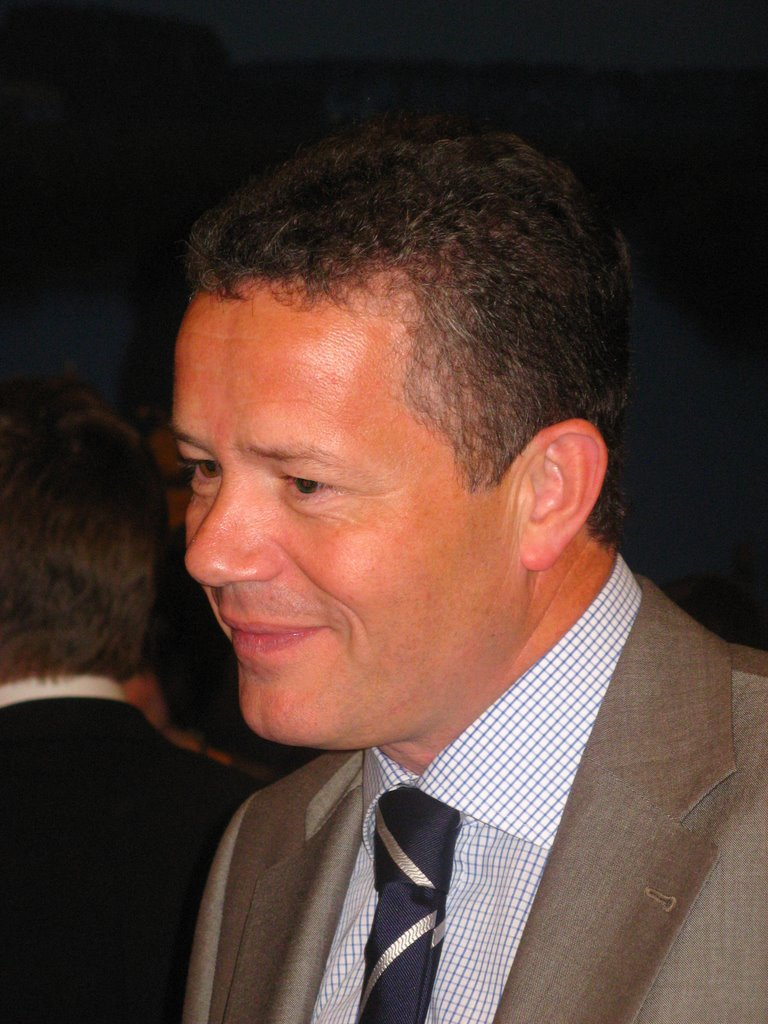
- Frank Vanhecke
- Born: Frank Arthur Hyppolite Vanhecke; 30 May 1959 (age 66); Bruges, Belgium
- Occupation: politician

Frank Arthur Hyppolite Vanhecke (born 30 May 1959) is a Belgian politician. Vanhecke started his career in Belgian politics as a student by joining the Jong Studentenverbond and later the Nationalistische Studentenvereniging. He gave up his membership of the Volksunie in 1977 after it acceded to a much-debated package of federal reforms. Vanhecke subsequently joined the Vlaams Nationale Partij, the predecessor of the Vlaams Blok.

Quickly climbing the party ranks, he became responsible for the party's press and media communication in 1986 and worked from 1989 as a personal assistant to Karel Dillen in the European Parliament, until he was elected to a Parliamentary seat himself in 1994. After a short term in the Belgian Senate, Vanhecke returned to European politics after the elections in 2004.

Vanhecke sat on its Committee on Civil Liberties, Justice and Home Affairs, and is a substitute for the Committee on Development and a member of the Delegation for relations with Switzerland, Iceland and Norway and to the European Economic Area (EEA) Joint Parliamentary Committee. His voting record in the European Parliament shows his clear pro-life stance.

When Karel Dillen resigned from his post as chairman of the Vlaams Blok in 1996, Vanhecke was designated as his successor. He was elected in 2001.

In November 2004 the Vlaams Blok was dissolved and a new political party was created under the name Vlaams Belang. Vanhecke was appointed chairman of this new party, a role he performed until 2008.

Vanhecke left Vlaams Belang in 2011, one of several high profile members at the time to quit the party, and finished the remainder of his term as an MEP as an independent and joined the Europe of Freedom and Democracy group. He subsequently announced his support for the New Flemish Alliance party but was refused membership due to his political past.

== Education ==
- 1981: Degree in literature and philosophy - communication sciences

== Career ==
- 1996-2008: General Chairman of the Vlaams Blok
- 1994-1996 and since 2000: Member of the Bruges City Council (group chairman)
- 1994-2003 and since 2004: Member of the European Parliament
- 2003-2004: Group leader in the Senate
- 1989-1994: Deputy Secretary-General, Technical Group of the European Right

== See also ==
- 2004 European Parliament election in Belgium
