= Ivo Belet =

Belgian politician

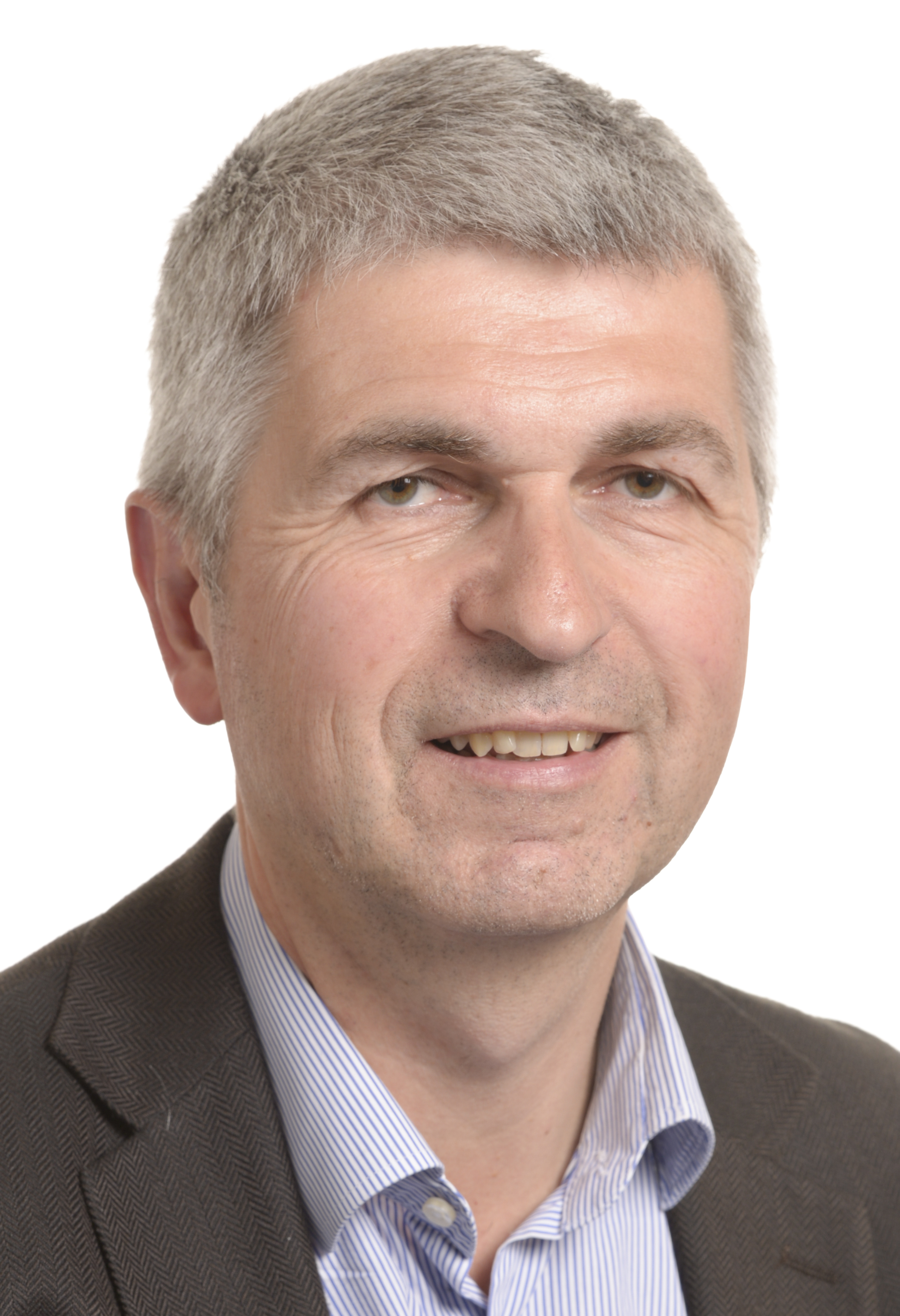

Member of the European Parliament
- In office 2004–2019

Personal details
- Born: 7 June 1959 (age 66) Sint-Truiden, Belgium
- Party: Christian Democratic and Flemish (CD&V)
- Website: www.ivobelet.be

Ivo Maria Robert Belet (Dutch pronunciation: [ˈivoː bəˈlɛt]; born on 7 June 1959 in Sint-Truiden), is a Belgian politician who served as Member of the European Parliament for Flanders with the CD&V, part of the European People's Party. He is a former news anchor of VRT, the Flemish public broadcaster.

== Education and early career ==
- 1981: Degree in Germanic philology from KU Leuven
- 1983: Trainee at the European Parliament and the European Commission
- 1984: Assistant to an MEP
- 1985: Editor at Concentra NV
- 1988: Degree in economics
- 1989: Journalist with VRT-TV (Flemish Radio and Television Company)
- 1996: MBA from Hasselt University

== Member of the European Parliament, 2004–2019 ==
During his time as Member of the European Parliament from 2004 until 2019, Belet served on the Committee on Industry, Research and Energy (2004-2006, 2009-2014), the Committee on Culture and Education (2006–2009) and the Committee on the Environment, Public Health and Food Safety (since 2014). From 2008 until 2009, he was a member of the Temporary Committee on Climate Change. From 2017 until 2019, he also served on the Special Committee on Terrorism, a temporary body to address the practical and legislative deficiencies in the fight against terrorism across the EU.

Belet was a substitute for the Committee on Transport and Tourism. He was also a member of the delegation for relations with India. In addition to his committee assignments, he served as a member of the European Parliament Intergroup on Children's Rights.

== Political positions ==
In May 2011, as rapporteur on the future of professional football, with Syed Kamall, Chairman of the Parliamentary Sports Intergroup, he called for a reform of the Fédération Internationale de Football Association: "FIFA is facing a series of corruption scandals, dragging professional football through the mud. It is time for a big clean-up. We, in the European Parliament, therefore support a thorough reform of FIFA. A transparent and independent committee needs to lead an enquiry into the malpractices".

== See also ==
- 2004 European Parliament election in Belgium
