= Frédérique Ries =

Belgian politician (born 1959)

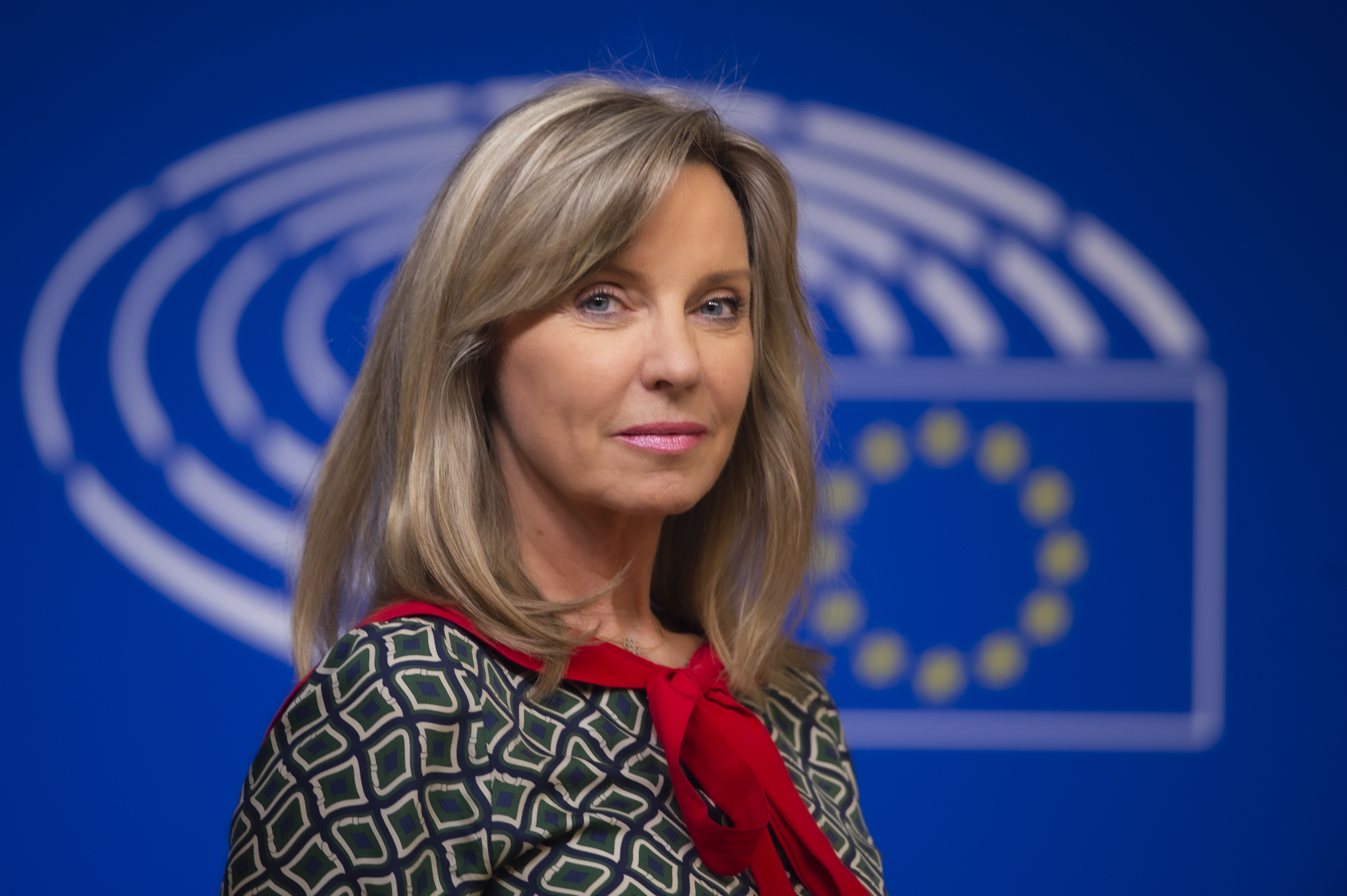

Member of the European Parliament
- Incumbent
- Assumed office 20 July 2004
- In office 20 July 1999 – 11 February 2004

Personal details
- Born: 14 May 1959 (age 66) Balen, Belgium
- Party: Mouvement Réformateur (MR)
- Occupation: politician

Frédérique Ries (born 14 May 1959) is a Belgian politician and former Member of the European Parliament for the French Community of Belgium with the MR/MCC/PRL, part of the Alliance of Liberals and Democrats for Europe.

She was a member of the delegation of the European Parliament for relations with Israel.

She is vice-president of the Israel lobby group European Friends of Israel.

== Early life and career ==
Ries graduated in Economics and mastered in Journalism at the University of Liège in 1981.

Ries worked as commercial director at Radio FM56 from 1981 to 1984. In 1984, she was hired at RTL (Radio Télévision Luxembourg) first in Luxembourg, as a producer and TV presenter from 1984 to 1987, then in Brussels where she edited and presented the news from 1987 to 1998.

== Political career ==
In 1999, Ries joined the MR (PRL at the time) to become a candidate on the European elections list. Elected Member of the European Parliament since 1999, she has since been a member of the Committee on the Environment, Public Health and Food Safety. In this capacity, she was the Parliament's rapporteur on a proposal to restrict cultivation of genetically modified organisms in 2014 and on the reduction of single-use plastics in 2018.

Ries served on the Subcommittee on Human Rights from 2004 until 2009 and on the Committee on Women's Rights and Gender Equality from 2009 until 2012. In 2019, she joined the Committee on Petitions.

In addition to her committee assignments, Ries has been a member of the Parliament's delegation for relations with Israel since 1999. She is also a member of the European Parliament Intergroup on LGBT Rights, the European Parliament Intergroup on Seas, Rivers, Islands and Coastal Areas and the MEPs Against Cancer group.

Re-elected in June 2009 with more than 116,000 votes, she is the 5th French-speaking political personality through all political parties in Belgium.

In 2014, Ries supported Françoise Grossetête's (unsuccessful) proposal to establish a European Parliament Intergroup on Health for Citizens, including stakeholders such as the European Cancer Patients Association and the Organisation for European Cancer Institutes.

Since the 2019 elections, Ries served as one of eight vice chairs of the Renew Europe group, under the leadership of chairman Dacian Cioloș.

== Overview ==
- 1981-1984: Commercial director, Radio FM56
- 1984-1987: Producer and presenter, RTL-TV Luxembourg
- 1987-1998: Journalist, RTL-TVI (editing and presenting the news and other programmes on topical events)
- 1999-2004: Member of the European Parliament
- 2004: State Secretary for European Affairs and Foreign Affairs
- 2004-2024: Member of the European Parliament

== Other activities ==
- Fondation EuroMedA, Member of the Board of Directors
