= Karel Dillen =

Belgian far-right, Flemish nationalist politician (1925-2007)

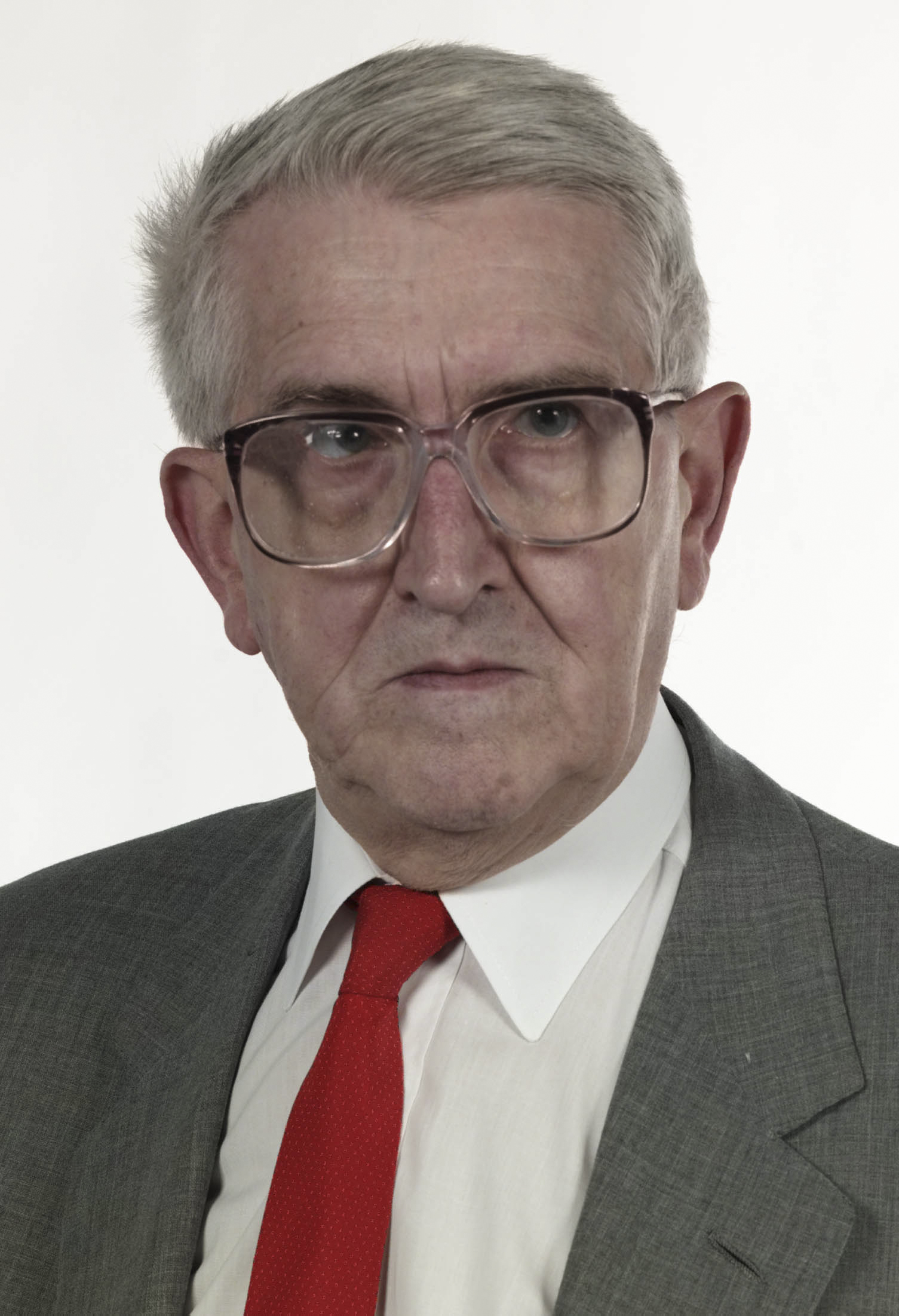
- Official portrait, 1999

Member of the European Parliament
- In office 1994–2004

Personal details
- Born: Karel Cornelia Constentijn Dillen; 16 October 1925 Antwerp, Belgium
- Died: 27 April 2007 (aged 81) Schilde, Belgium
- Party: Vlaams Blok
- Other political affiliations: Vlaams Belang

Karel Cornelia Constantijn Dillen (16 October 1925 – 27 April 2007) was a Belgian far-right, Flemish nationalist politician who served as a Member of the European Parliament from 1994 to 2004.

== Life ==
According to Paul Beliën, editor of The Brussels Journal, "Dillen came from a non-political background. His father, an Antwerp labourer, abandoned his wife and their two sons when Dillen was still a baby. He was raised by his mother. Neither he, nor his brother nor his mother were involved in any political activities at all during the war,..."

In 1977 he established the Vlaams Nationale Partij (Flemish National Party), which became Vlaams Blok at the elections of 1978. He was president of Vlaams Blok (later reformed as Vlaams Belang) until he appointed Frank Vanhecke as his successor in 1996. He was anti-immigration, anti-communism and defended the apartheid system in South Africa in various articles and pamphlets.

Karel Dillen was a Member of the European Parliament (MEP) between 1994 and 2004, and vice-chairman of the Technical Fraction of the European Right, together with among others Jean-Marie Le Pen and Franz Schönhuber.

Dillen's daughter Marijke Dillen is also active in Belgian politics.

== Holocaust denial ==
Karel Dillen had a history of associating with far-right figures. Though he was not an active Nazi collaborator during the Second World War himself, he described himself as a "passive" collaborator. He also translated in 1951 the pamphlet Nuremberg ou la terre promise ("Nuremberg or the Promised Land"), a Holocaust denial book by Maurice Bardèche. Afterwards, Dillen maintained regular contact with the author. The book states that the Nazi concentration camps were mock-ups built with the help of Hollywood after World War II.
