= Gérard Deprez =

Belgian politician (born 1943)

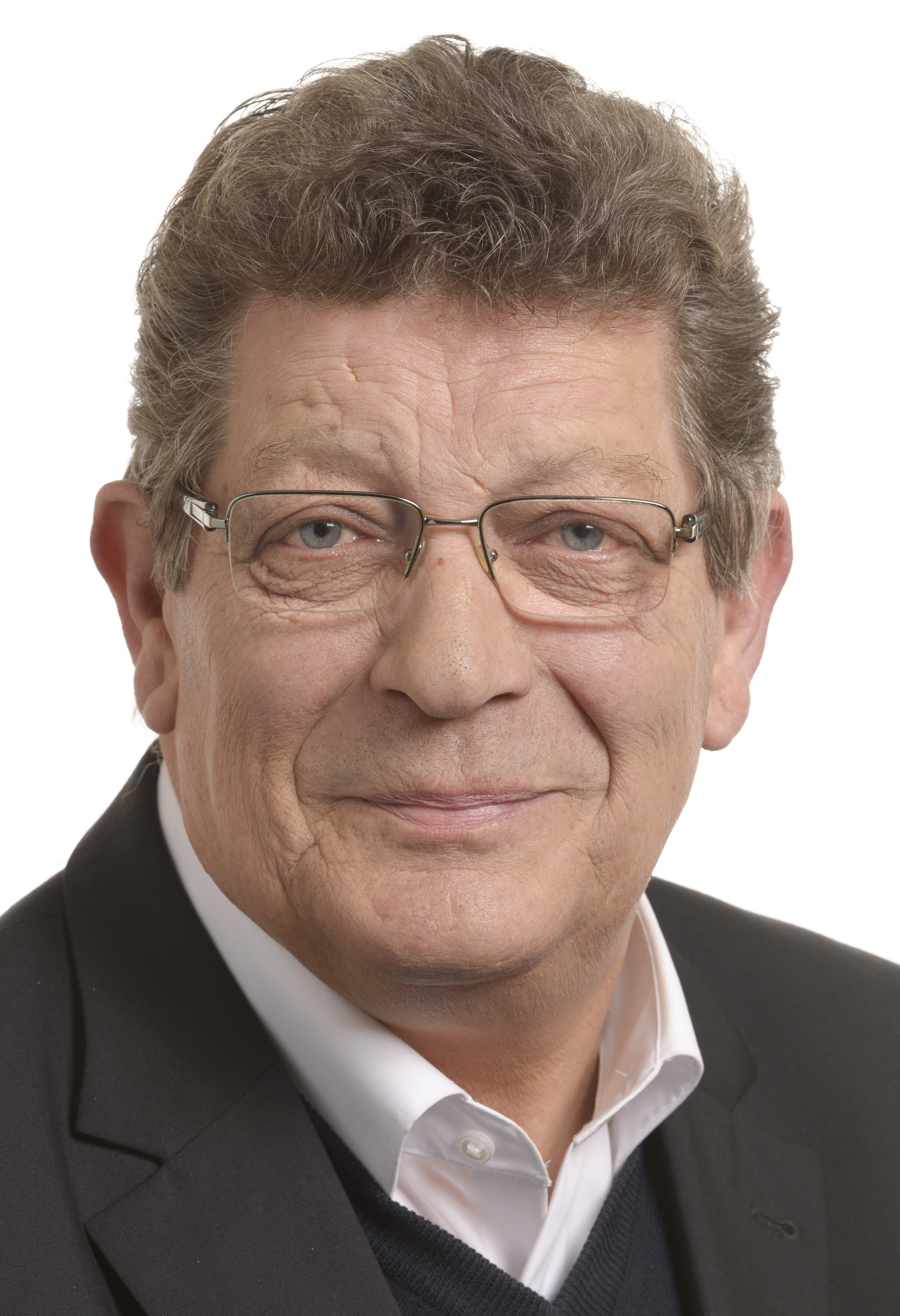

Gérard M.J. Deprez (French pronunciation: [ʒeʁaʁ dəpʁe]; born 13 August 1943 in Noville, Bastogne) is a Belgian politician. He was the president of the Walloon Christian Social Party (PSC) from 1981 to 1996. In 1998 he left the PSC and founded the Citizens' Movement for Change (MCC). He was a Member of the European Parliament representing the French Community of Belgium for six terms from 1984 to 2009 and again from 2014 until 2019. He is the Delegate General of the European Democratic Party.

== Life and political career ==
Deprez studied philosophy, language and literature and added postgraduate studies in sociology. He worked as an assistant lecturer at the Catholic University of Louvain from 1966 to 1974 and did his doctorate at the same time.

Subsequently, he went into politics, serving as adviser in the office of the Minister for French Culture for one year. Then he became political adviser to the president of the PSC. In 1979 he became the head of the Deputy Prime Minister's office. In 1981 he was elected president of the PSC and stayed for 15 years. In this capacity, he was a member of the European People's Party's policy bureau, as well. In 1984 he was elected to the European Parliament for the first time. In 1995, he was conferred the honorary title of Minister of State. In the same year, he announced his retirement as party leader.

His successor was, to Deprez' discontent, Charles-Ferdinand Nothomb. Deprez proposed to confederate the PSC with the Liberal Reformist Party (PRL), but could not convince his party colleagues. Therefore, he was edged out of the party and founded the MCC in 1998. He immediately forged an alliance of his new party with the PRL and the regionalist Democratic Front of the Francophones (FDF), which became the Reformist Movement (MR) in 2002 and of which Deprez has since been a vice-chairman. In 2004 he left the European Parliament's group of the European People's Party and joined the European Democratic Party and the parliamentary group Alliance of Liberals and Democrats for Europe (ALDE). He served in the European Parliament's Committee on Budgets, was the chairman of the Committee on Civil Liberties, Justice and Home Affairs and a member of the Delegation to the EU-Turkey Joint Parliamentary Committee.

Deprez was the winner of the Justice and Civil Liberties Award, MEP Awards 2017.
