= Van Os =

Van Os is a Dutch toponymic surname meaning "from Oss", a town in North Brabant. Variant spellings are Van Osch and Van Oss. Notable people with the surname include:

Van Os / VanOs

- Arie van Os (born 1937), Dutch businessman and financial director
- Ben van Os (1944–2012), Dutch production designer and art director
- David Van Os (1950–2023), American lawyer and politician
- Dirck van Os (1556–1615), Dutch businessman, c-founder of the Amsterdam Exchange Bank and the United East India Company (VOC)
- Georgius Jacobus Johannes van Os (1782–1861), Dutch still life painter, son of Jan van Os
- Henk van Os (1938–2025), Dutch art historian
- Jan van Os (1744–1808), Dutch painter known for his fruit and flower still lives
- Jim van Os (born 1960), Dutch psychiatrist and epidemiologist
- Joanne van Os (born 1955), Australian author and former wife of Rod Ansell
- Maria Margaretha van Os (1779–1862), Dutch flower painter, daughter of Jan van Os
- Nick Vanos (1963–1987), American basketball player
- Pieter van Os (1776–1839), Dutch animal and landscape painter and engraver, son of Jan van Os
- Pieter Frederik van Os (1808–1892), Dutch animal and landscape painter, son of Pieter van Os
- Rosa de Vries-van Os (1828–1889), Dutch operatic soprano
- Sussanna van Os née de la Croix (1755–1789), Dutch painter, wife of Jan van Os
- Ton van Os (born 1941), Dutch etcher, sculptor, painter, and mosaicist
- Willibrord van Os (1744–1825), Dutch Old Catholic Archbishop of Utrecht

Van Osch

- Henri van Osch (1945–2001), Dutch swimmer
- Kalia Van Osch (born 1993), Canadian curler
- Kesa Van Osch (born 1991), Canadian curler
- Suzzanna van Osch (1942–2008), Indonesian actress
- Ton van Osch (born 1955), Dutch military commander, Director General of the European Union Military Staff 2010–2013
- Yanick van Osch (born 1997), Dutch football goalkeeper

== See also ==
- Van Oss polygon and Van Oss apeirogon, named after the Dutch mathematician Salomon Levi van Oss (1864–1937)
