= De la Cruz =

- Language: Spanish

Origin
- Meaning: "Of the Cross"

Other names
- Variant forms: da Cruz, Dellacroce, Delacroix, dela Cruz

De la Cruz, usually written as de la Cruz and commonly spelled dela Cruz in the Philippines, is a Spanish surname meaning "of the Cross". It may refer to:

== People ==
- Apolinario de la Cruz (1815–1841), Filipino religious leader
- Bethania de la Cruz (born 1987), Dominican volleyball player
- Bryan De La Cruz (born 1996), Dominican baseball player
- Cacho de la Cruz (1937–2025), Argentine-Uruguayan entertainer
- Carlos de la Cruz, Cuban-American chairman of CC1 Companies
- Claudia De la Cruz (born 1980/1981), American community organizer and activist
- David de la Cruz (born 1989), Spanish cyclist
- Elly De La Cruz (born 2002), Dominican baseball player
- Eulogio de la Cruz (1984–2021), Dominican baseball player
- Fernando de la Cruz (born 1971), Dominican baseball player
- Francisco Dela Cruz (1962–2019), Northern Mariana Islands politician
- Jerry De La Cruz (born 1948), American artist
- Jessica de la Cruz (born 1981), American politician
- José María de la Cruz (1799–1875), Chilean general and politician
- José de la Cruz (1746–1829), Filipino writer more popularly known as Huseng Sisiw
- Joshua Dela Cruz (born 1989), Filipino-American actor
- Juan de la Cruz (1542–1591), Spanish friar and poet
- Juan de la Cruz (basketball) (born 1954), Argentine-born Spanish pivot
- Juana Inés de la Cruz (1648–1695), Mexican scholar, poet, and nun
- Magdalena de la Cruz (1487–1560), Spanish Franciscan nun of Cordova
- Maximiliano de la Cruz (born 1976), Uruguayan actor and television presenter
- Melissa de la Cruz (born 1971), American author
- Monica De La Cruz (born 1974), American politician
- Nicolás de la Cruz (born 1997), Uruguayan footballer
- Oswaldo de la Cruz (1940–2021), Peruvian politician
- Ramón Alfredo de la Cruz Baldera (born 1961), Dominican Republic Roman Catholic bishop
- Ramón de la Cruz (1731–1794), Spanish neoclassical dramatist
- Tommy de la Cruz (1911–1958), Dominican baseball player
- Ulises de la Cruz (born 1974), Ecuadorian footballer
- Veronica De La Cruz (born 1980), Filipino-American television anchor
- Virginia de la Cruz, Argentine-Paraguayan actress

== Fictional characters ==
- Cruz de la Cruz, a central character in John H. Ritter's 2003 novel The Boy Who Saved Baseball
- Ernesto de la Cruz, a character from the 2017 Pixar film, Coco
- Estela de la Cruz, a character in the Netflix series 13 Reasons Why
- Mitch de la Cruz, a character from the animated series Get Blake!
- Montgomery "Monty" de la Cruz, a character in the Netflix series 13 Reasons Why
- Guillermo de la Cruz, a vampire servant / hunter in the FX series What We Do in the Shadows

== Music ==
- De La Cruz, an 80's-influenced hard rock band from Australia
- Juan de la Cruz Band, a 70's hard rock band from the Philippines

== See also ==
- Caravaca de la Cruz, a town in Spain
- Puerto de la Cruz, a city on the island of Tenerife
- Juan dela Cruz, a demonym for Filipinos and one of the national personifications of the Philippines
- Delacroix
- Dellacroce
- Aroldis Chapman, maternal name de la Cruz, Cuban relief pitcher for the New York Yankees
