= De la Croix =

de la Croix (French pronunciation: [də la kʁwa]) is a French surname meaning "of the Cross". Notable people with the surname include:

- Blane De St. Croix (born 1954), American artist
- Charles de la Croix (1792–1869), Flemish Roman Catholic missionary
- Charles Eugène Gabriel de La Croix (1727–1801), French marshal
- David de la Croix (born 1964), Belgian scholar
- Étienne de la Croix (1579–1643), French Jesuit, missionary and writer
- Félix du Temple de la Croix (1823–1890), French naval officer and inventor
- François Pétis de la Croix (1653–1713), French orientalist
- Jean Louis de la Croix, French archer
- Pierre Frédéric de la Croix (1709–1782), Dutch painter
- Raven De La Croix (born 1947), American actress
- St. Sukie de la Croix (born 1951), American writer
- Susanna de la Croix (1755–1789), Dutch Painter
- William de St Croix (1819–1877), English clergyman

== See also ==
- Delacroix
- Delcroix
- Col de la Croix (disambiguation)
- Saint-Jean-de-la-Croix
