= Petronella van Woensel =

Dutch painter and graphic artist

- Born: 14 May 1785; Raalte
- Died: 12 November 1839 (aged 54); The Hague

Petronella van Woensel (14 May 1785 – 12 November 1839) was a Dutch painter and a graphic artist.

Woensel was born in Raalte and became a pupil of the flower painters Georgius Jacobus Johannes van Os and Jan van Os. She is known for her flower paintings and from 1822 was an honorary member of the Koninklijke Academie voor Beeldende Kunsten. There exist also sets of drawings and etchings by her hand, many of them are copy after other masters. She died in the arms of her best friend and colleague, Maria Margaretha van Os.

Woensel died in The Hague.
