= Michel Delacroix =

Michel Delacroix may refer to:

- Michel Delacroix (painter) (born 1933), French painter
- Michel Delacroix (politician), Belgian politician
