= Delacroix (disambiguation) =

Eugène Delacroix (1798–1863) was a French artist and leader of the French Romantic school.

Delacroix (French pronunciation: [dəlakʁwa]) is a French surname that derives from de la Croix ("of the Cross") and may also refer to:

== People ==
- Blanche Delacroix, birth name of Caroline Lacroix (1883-1948), French-Romanian mistress of Leopold II of Belgium
- Charles-François Delacroix (1741–1805), French ambassador to the Netherlands
- Gustave Delacroix de Ravignan (1795–1858), French Jesuit preacher and author
- Jean-François Delacroix (1753–1794), French revolutionary politician
- Léon Delacroix (1867–1929), Belgian statesman
- Michel Delacroix (painter) (born 1933), French painter
- Michel Delacroix (politician), Belgian politician
- Hélène Miard-Delacroix (born 1959), French historian, Germanist, professor
- Sylvie Delacroix, British AI data, law and ethics professor

== Fictional characters ==
- Bruno Delacroix, character from the video game Call of Duty: Black Ops 4 Voyage of Despair
- Catherine Delacroix, character from the video game Orwell: Keeping an Eye on You
- Eduard Delacroix, character from the serial novel The Green Mile and its film adaptation
- Genevieve Delacroix, character from the Netflix series Bridgerton
- Monique Delacroix Bond, mother of James Bond
- Victor Delacroix, character from the video game Chaos Legion
- Yvette Delacroix, character from the video game The Dagger of Amon Ra

== Other ==
- Delacroix, Louisiana, USA
- Delacroix metro station, in Brussels, Belgium
- Musée national Eugène Delacroix, art museum in Paris, France
- 10310 Delacroix, an asteroid

== See also ==
- Decroix, a surname
- de la Croix, a French surname
- de la Cruz, a Spanish surname
- Delcroix, a French surname
- Aniello Dellacroce (1914–1985), American mobster
