= Pieter Frederik van Os =

Dutch painter

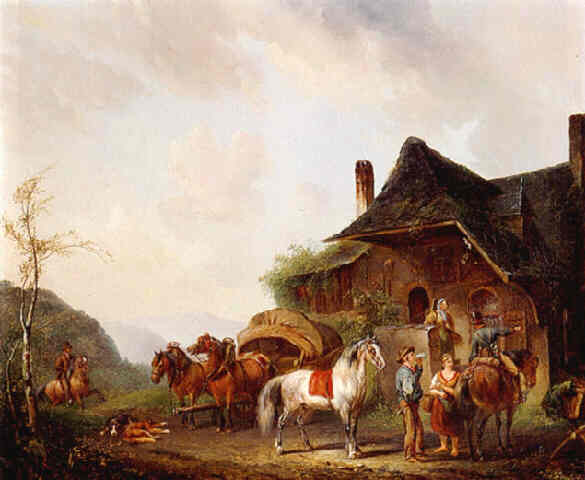
Horsemen and travelers outside an inn

Pieter Fredrik van Os (8 October 1808 – 31 March 1892) was a painter from the Northern Netherlands. He was the son and pupil of Pieter Gerardus van Os and worked mainly in the spirit of his father.

== Biography ==
Van Os was born in Amsterdam, into a well-known family of artists. His grandparents were the painters Jan van Os and Susanna de la Croix. Besides his father, his aunt and uncle also became painters: Georgius and Maria Margaretha van Os. Van Os studied at the Royal Academy in Amsterdam, before traveling through Belgium and Germany. He settled in Haarlem in 1839. Like his father he specialized in painting animals, especially horses in all of their forms, as a work horse, draft horse or racehorse. In 1846 he became a board member of the Haarlem painting club "Kunst zij ons Doel". He died, aged 83, in Haarlem.

Pieter Frederik van Os was the teacher of Anton Mauve (1838–1888) and Johannes Hubertus Leonardus de Haas (1832–1908).
