= Fernando Cruz =

Fernando Cruz may refer to:

- Fernando Cruz (baseball) (born 1990), Puerto Rican baseball player
- Fernando Cruz (cyclist) (born 1953), Colombian cyclist
- Fernando Cruz (footballer) (1940–2025), Portuguese footballer

== See also ==
- Fernando de la Cruz (born 1971), Dominican baseball player
- Fernando Cruz Castro (born 1949), Chief Justice of the Supreme Court of Costa Rica
