= Jan van Os =

Dutch painter

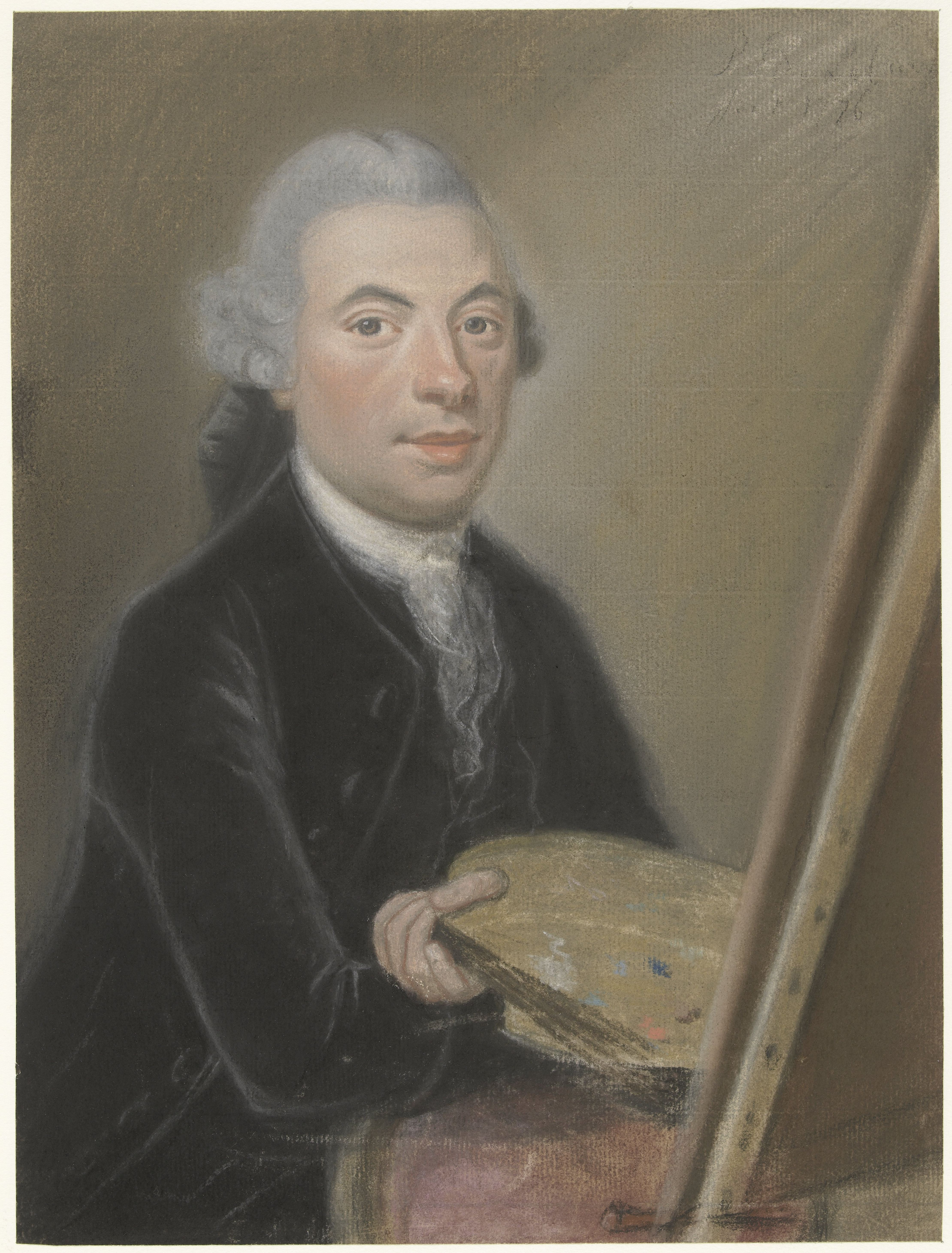
- Portrait of Jan van Os by his father in law, Pierre Frédéric de la Croix
- Born: 23 February 1744; Middelharnis, Netherlands
- Died: 7 February 1808 (aged 63); The Hague, Netherlands
- Known for: Painting

Jan van Os (23 February 1744 – 7 February 1808) was a Dutch painter and a member of the renowned Van Os family of artists.

== Biography ==
Van Os was born in Middelharnis. He was taught by Aert Schouman in The Hague, where he would spend the rest of his life. In 1773, he recorded in the painters' confraternity. In 1775, he married Susanna de La Croix, an able pastellist and the daughter of the deaf-mute portraitist Pieter Frederik de la Croix.

Van Os is mostly known for his fruit and flower still life paintings, though he started his career painting seascapes. His floral still lifes were painted in the style of Jan van Huysum, with the flowers usually presented on a marble ledge against a green background.

He was the father of artists Pieter van Os, Maria Margaretha van Os, and Georgius Jacobus Johannes van Os and grandfather to the painter Pieter Frederik van Os.

Jan van Os was the teacher of his children as well as Petronella van Woensel, a friend of his daughter Maria.

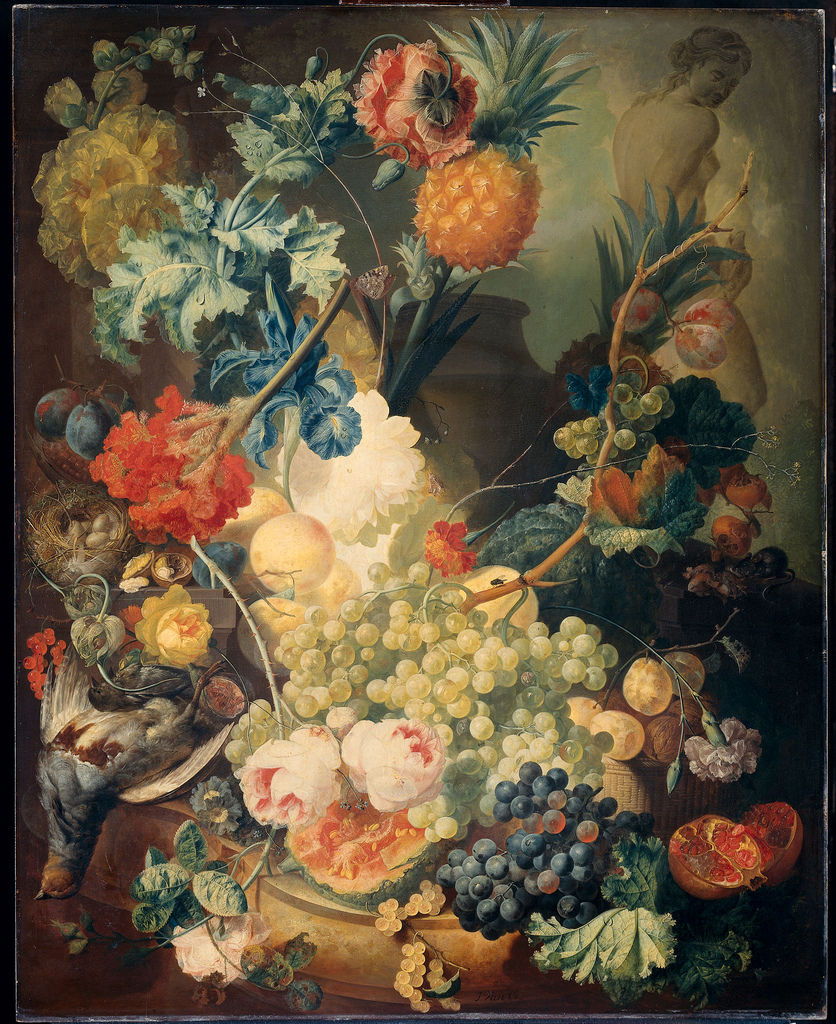
Still Life with Flowers, Fruits, and Poultry, 1774

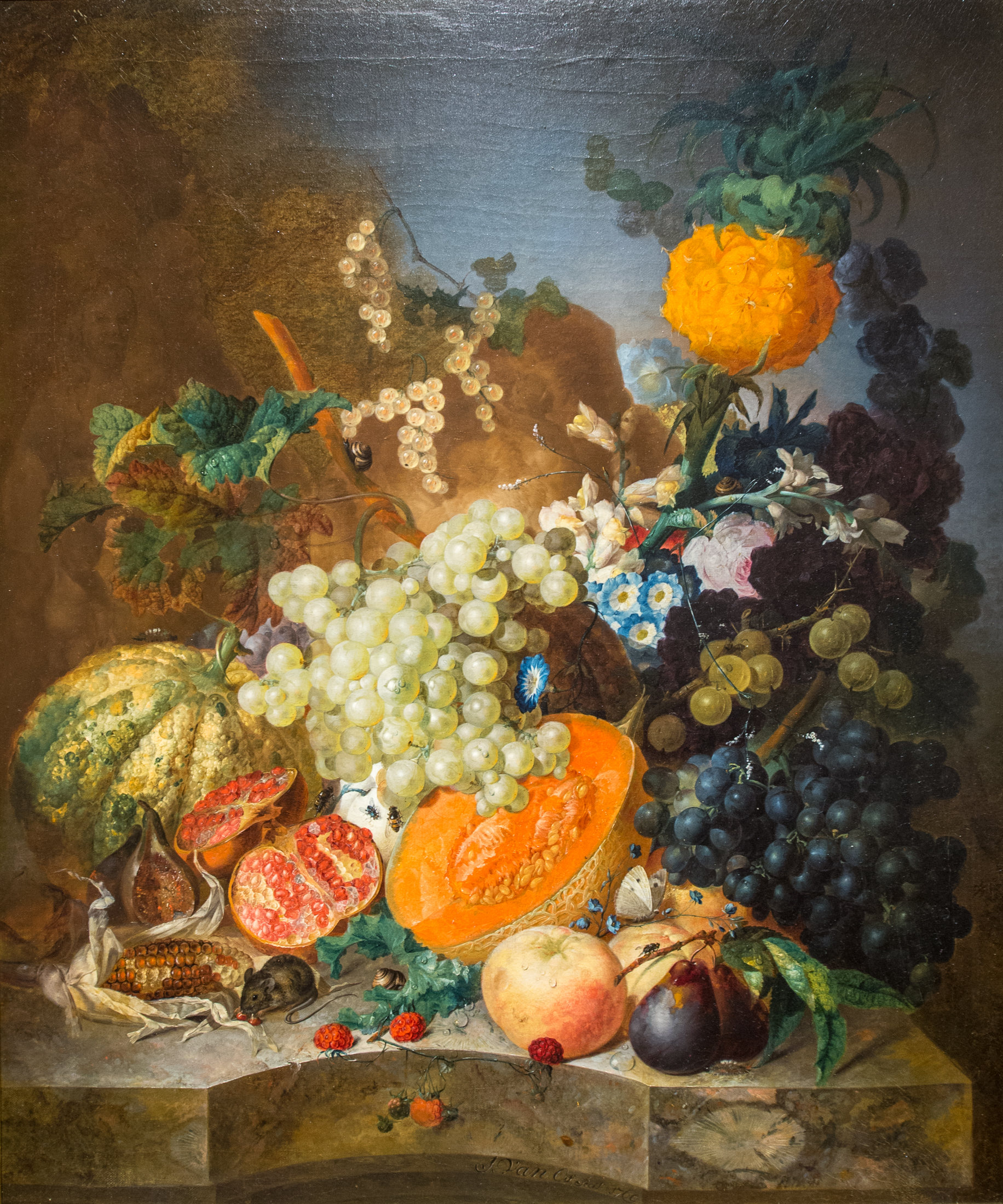
Still Life with Fruit, 1769, on display at the Frick Art & Historical Center
