= Johannes Hubertus Leonardus de Haas =

Dutch painter

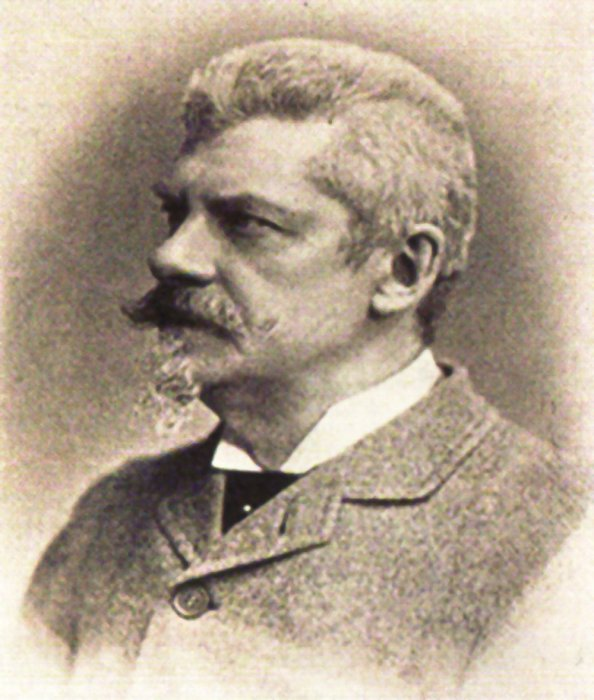
- Born: 25 March 1832; Hedel, Netherlands
- Died: 4 August 1908 (aged 76); Königswinter, Germany
- Known for: Painting

Johannes Hubertus Leonardus de Haas (25 March 1832 – 4 August 1908) was a Dutch animal and landscape painter, and a peripheral figure of the Hague School.

Born at Hedel, De Haas spend his youth in Amsterdam where he got his first art education at evening-classes at the Koninklijke Academie. Consequently, he moved to Haarlem where he was apprenticed to the artist Pieter Frederik van Os. During his stay in Haarlem he befriended Paul Gabriël and Hendrik Dirk Kruseman Van Elten who were also studying with Van Os.

In 1853, together with his two friends, De Haas decided to go to Oosterbeek. Here they came into contact with the influential landscape painter Johannes Warnardus Bilders and the group of painters which had gathered around him, many of whom would later be part of the Hague School. De Haas also met his future wife in Oosterbeek, Bilders' daughter, Caroline. In 1855 he received good reviews for his pictures that were exhibited in Paris from the noted art critic Jean Baptiste Gustave Planche.

In 1857 De Haas first went to Brussels, where he became friends with Willem Roelofs. De Haas frequently returned to the Netherlands and Oosterbeek for inspiration and Caroline. From 1860 his friend Gabriël also lived in Brussels, and De Haas often painted cattle in the landscapes of both Roelofs and Gabriel, fitting in perfectly with both their styles. In 1860 he won the gold medal at the exhibition of Utrecht.

From 1861 until 1869 De Haas is permanently settled in Brussels, painting mainly on the coasts of Flanders and Picardie in northern France. He married Caroline Bilders in 1862, and in 1864 they are briefly joined by her brother, the promising painter Gerard Bilders. In 1865 Caroline dies at the age of 24 of tuberculosis, leaving him with a young son. During his stay in Brussels De Haas is instrumental in passing on the style of the Barbizon school to the painters at Oosterbeek.

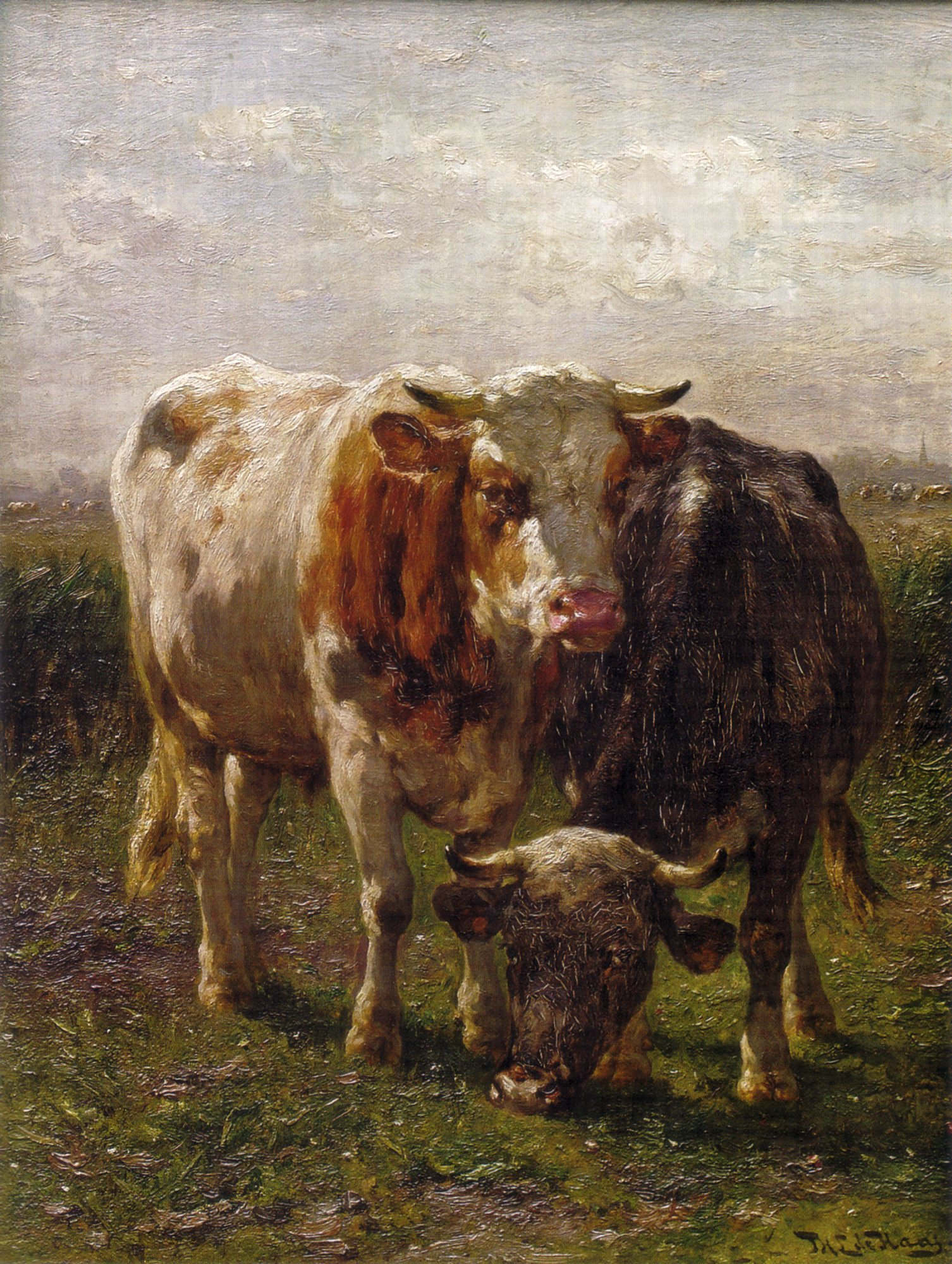

In 1869 he received gold medals for his work at the exhibitions in Munich. At this time he befriends the future prince regent of Bavaria, Luitpold. This friendship provides him with many opportunities to contribute to exhibitions in Bavaria and later the German Empire. From 1888 he was responsible for the selection of the Dutch entries to the Munich exhibition. This position he antagonised many young Dutch painters for his conservative choices. In 1892 he was chosen by Queen Emma to make a selection from the paintings from the royal collection for an exhibition at the Alte Pinakothek in Munich. De Haas died on 4 August 1908 in Königswinter.

== Bibliography ==
- Gruyter, Jos. de (1968), De Haagse School, Lemniscaat
- Leeuw, Ronald de; Sillevis, John; Dumas, Charles (1983), De Haagse School
- Sillevis, John; Tabak, Anne (2001), Het Haagse School boek, Waanders Uitgeverij, ISBN 978-90-400-9540-5
- Kuil, Pieter van der (2007), Jan Kneppelhout en zijn tijdgenoten, Kontrast, ISBN 978-90-78215-21-9
