= Jan Kops =

Dutch agronomist and botanist

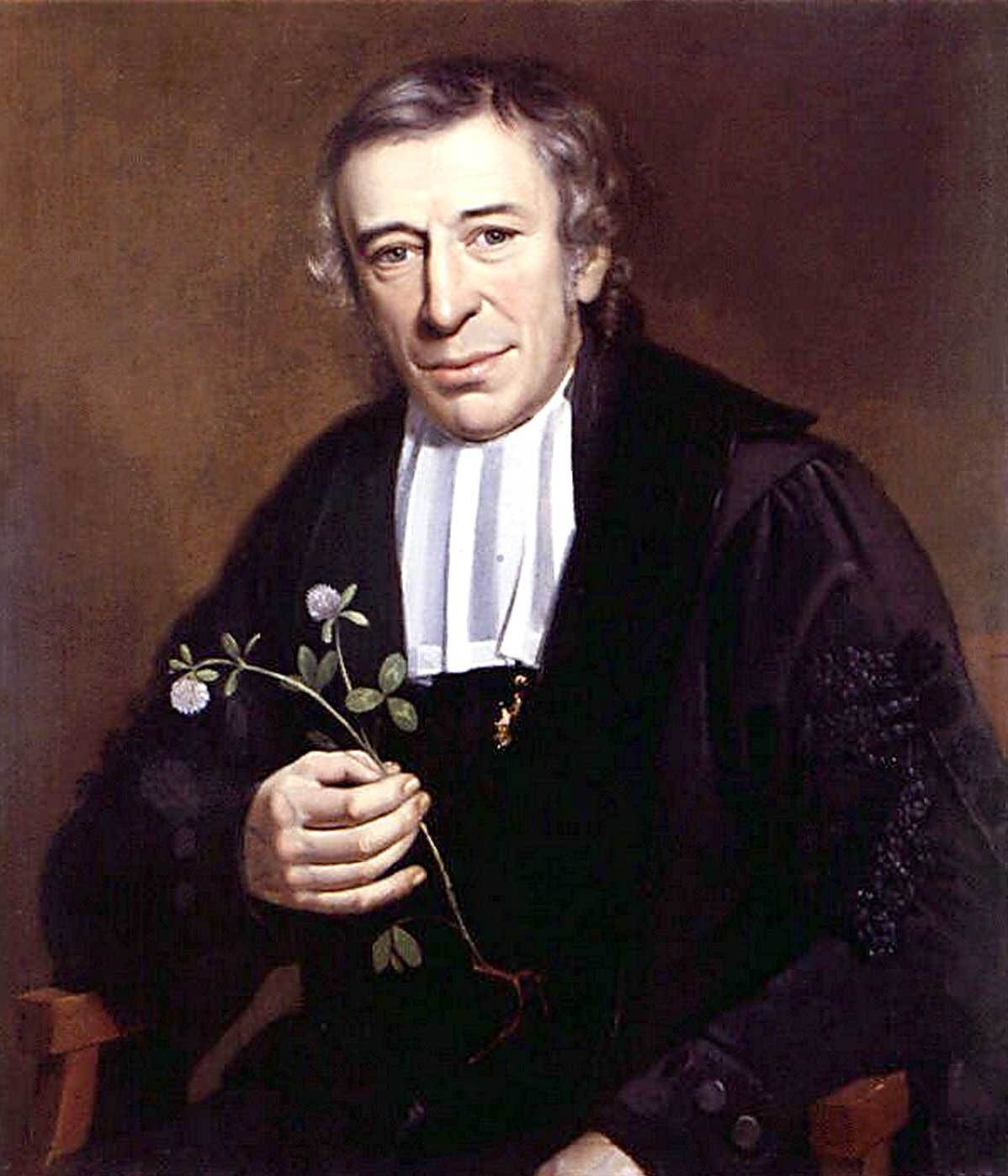

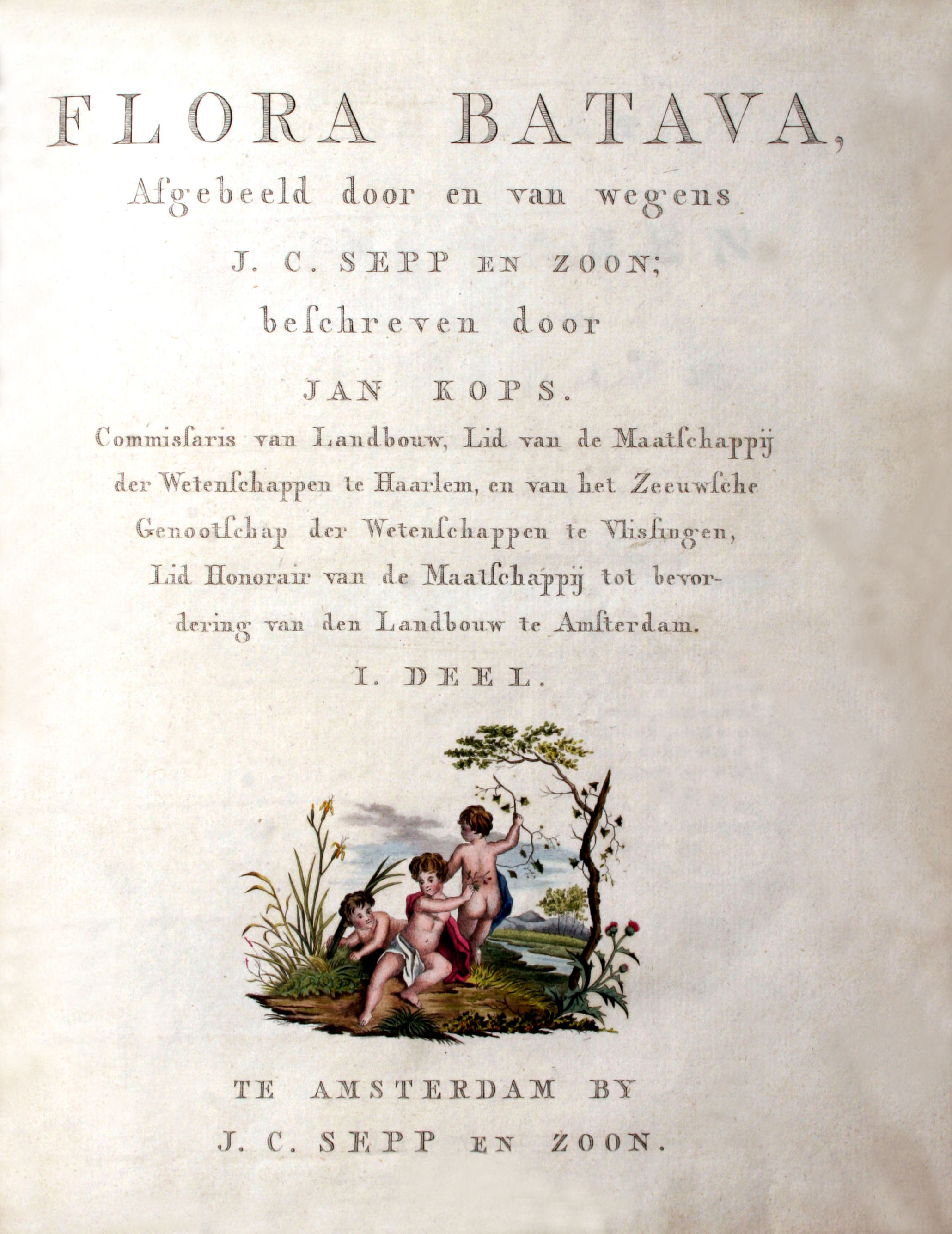
Title page of "Flora Batava"

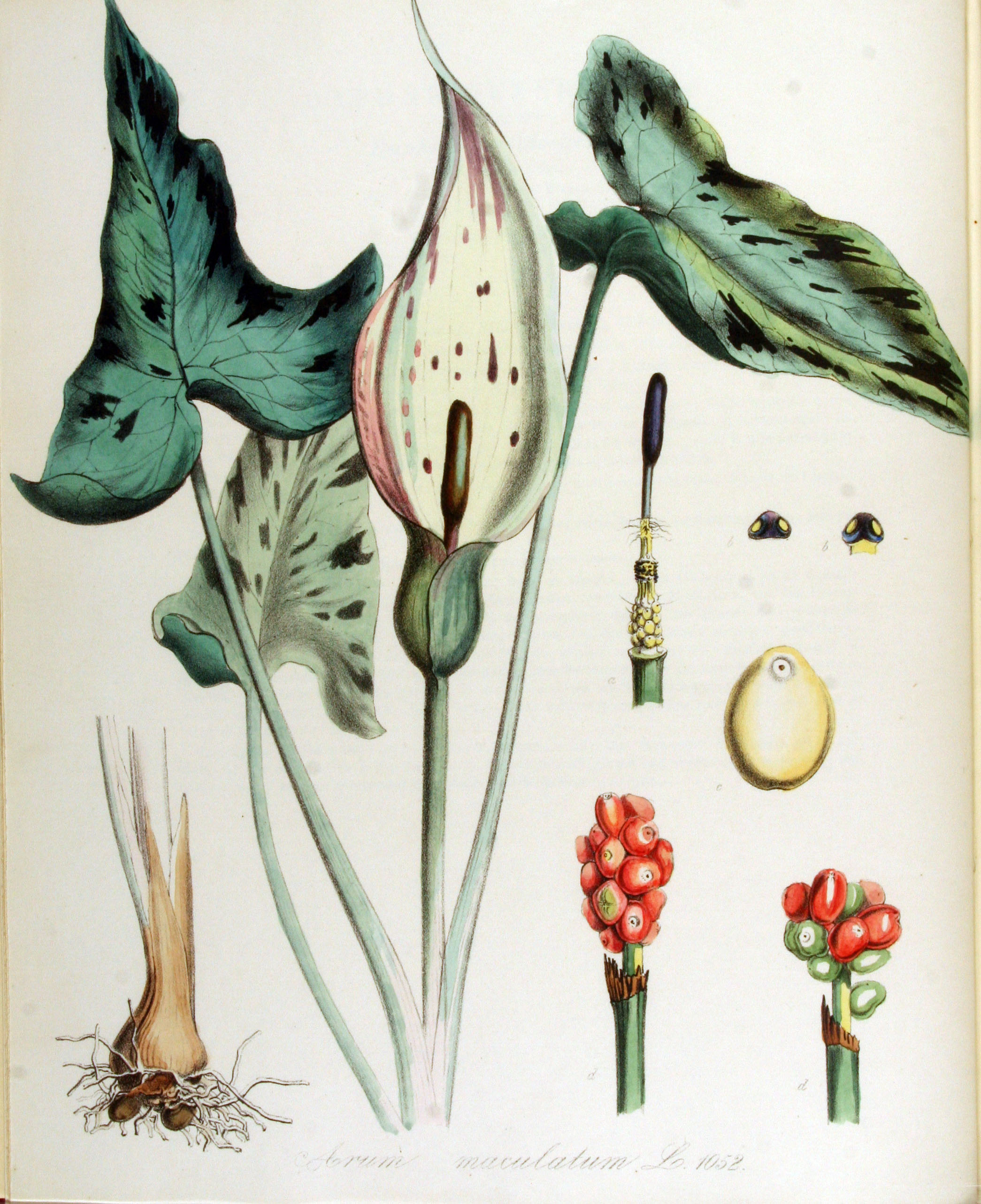
Arum maculatum, plate from "Flora Batava"

Jan Kops (6 March 1765 Amsterdam - 9 January 1849 Utrecht) was an Anabaptist Dutch agronomist and botanist. His most notable contribution to botany was the founding of the long-lived journal "Flora Batava" in 1800 and contributing text for the first 10 volumes.

== Biography ==
Jan Kops was the son of Jacobus Kops, a yarn merchant, and Hillegond Schotvanger, both conservative Old Frisian Mennonites. On the death of his father in December 1773, Jan Kops with his stepmother and sister moved from Amsterdam to Haarlem, where he received tuition first at the French and then at the Latin school. He was expected to follow the family tradition of a career in the textile industry, but Kops was ambitious and wanted a more extensive education. For the moment he immersed himself in a study of Dutch literature and botany.

In December 1781 Kops enrolled at the Amsterdam Theological Seminary, a move which was not his first choice, as he would rather have followed his interest in botany and natural history, but understood that these were not lucrative fields. Anabaptists, such as Kops, were systematically excluded from public office. However this did not deter Kops from attending courses in the natural sciences at the Athenaeum Illustre of Amsterdam.

In April 1787 Kops passed his examination at the Anabaptist seminary and served as pastor at Leiden until 1800, enrolling at the local university for a number of courses. In his spare time he was kept busy by his interest in literature.

A great setback in Kops' church career was his being passed over in 1792 as preacher for the Haarlem congregation, the same thing happening in Amsterdam. Kops was furious over this and sought diversion in botany. As a consequence the first part of "Flora Batava" appeared in 1800. The Batavian Revolution led to the Mennonites' being placed on equal footing with the Dutch Reformed Church, and in 1795 and 1796 he was a member and chairman of Leiden's local authority.

Kops next turned his attention to agriculture, and looked into the possibility of turning the dune region into productive farmland. He assembled a panel of agricultural experts and approached the Provincial Administration of Holland, setting out his ideas. His proposals met with a favourable reception and in September 1796 a study group was put together with Kops as secretary, and a report soon followed. His reputation as agronomist firmly established by the report, he was appointed in June 1800 as director of agriculture in the Netherlands, causing him to leave the ministry in Leiden and take up an office at The Hague, a post he was to fill until 1815. In this new capacity Kops undertook a tour of five months through the Netherlands, enabling him to personally judge the state of the nation's agriculture. On his initiative the first Dutch agricultural magazine Magazijn van Vaderlandschen Landbouw appeared between 1803 and 1814. He also initiated the formation of 10 regional agricultural commissions to advise the government. In 1808 he established the first "Agricultural Cabinet" to provide farmers with assistance and advice on farming equipment and implements.

His previous interests resurfaced and in 1815 he was appointed professor of botany and agricultural economics at the University of Utrecht, a position he would hold until 1835. In this period he also preached as minister from 1816 to 1843 to the Mennonites in Utrecht, The Hague and Amsterdam.

== Flora Batava ==
The first issue of "Flora Batava" was published in Amsterdam in 1800, with illustrations that were provided by artists working under J. C. Sepp & Son. The publisher Jan Christiaan Sepp was not only a Mennonite, but also an engraver, etcher, bookseller, author and illustrator. The final issue, volume 28, was published in 1934. Willem Jan Lütjeharms, the editor for that volume, stated that the work had ended and its publication had stretched over more years than any other botanical magazine. The work of text, illustrations and printing had changed hands many times during the course of its history. Several artists had produced the illustrations, but since the plates were unsigned, attribution is difficult. Most of the illustrations in the first three volumes were from the hand of (Georg Jacob Johann van Os), a flower and fruit painter for the Sèvres porcelain factory.

Kops chose the title of his work for historical reasons; "Batavia" was a region of the Netherlands when it still formed part of the Roman Empire. Flora Batava was the name given the garden of Agnes Block (1629-1704), an art collector and horticulturist. She was the daughter of a Mennonite textile merchant and after the death of her first husband she bought a country estate on the Vecht River in Loenen and named it Vijverhof. A procession of artists, including Maria Sibylla Merian, visited her home and left behind a large number of paintings of flowers from her garden.

Kops married Catharina Daams (1768-1805) in January 1788, the marriage producing 6 sons and 5 daughters. After the death of Catharina in 1805, Kops was married in 1807 to Helena Biljouw (1774-1855). From this marriage came 5 sons and 1 daughter, 3 of the 5 sons dying young.
