= Delcroix =

Delcroix is a French surname derived from de la Croix ("of the Cross"). Notable people with the surname include:

- Catherine Delcroix (born 1955), French sociologist
- Jean-Loup Delcroix (1924–2003), French physicist
- Konstantin Delcroix (1894-1982), German actor
- Leo Delcroix (1949–2022), Belgian politician
- Ludo Delcroix (born 1950), Belgian cyclist
- Olivier Delcroix (writer) (born 1967), French writer and journalist
- Patrick Delcroix (born 1963), French dancer and choreographer
- Tobias Delcroix (born 1997), French photographer

== See also ==
- Decroix
- de la Croix
- Delacroix
