= Pierre Frédéric de la Croix =

Dutch painter

- Born: 1709; France
- Died: 1782 (aged 72–73); The Hague, Netherlands
- Occupation: Painter

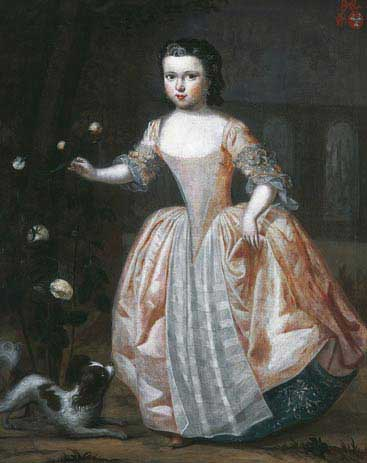
Portrait of a girl

Pierre Frédéric de la Croix (1709 – 1782) was an 18th-century painter from the Dutch Republic.

== Biography ==
He was born in France but moved to The Hague, where he joined the Confrerie Pictura in 1753. He was deaf mute, but had several children, including his daughter Susanna who married the flower painter Jan van Os, and the mysterious "J. de la Croix", both of whom were known for pastel portraits in the manner of their father. He died in The Hague.
