= Decroix =

Decroix (French pronunciation: [dəkʁwa]) is a surname. Notable people with the surname include:

- Emile Decroix (1904–1967), Belgian racing cyclist
- Éric Decroix (born 1969), French footballer
- Jacques Joseph Marie Decroix (1746–1826), French writer and collector
- Julien Decroix, better known as Soan, (born 1981), French singer-songwriter
- Lieselot Decroix (born 1987), Belgian road cyclist
- Marjolein Decroix (born 1992), Belgian alpine skier

== See also ==
- Delacroix
- Delcroix
