= John H. Ritter =

American novelist

- Born: October 31, 1951 (age 74); Los Angeles, California, U.S.
- Education: University of California, San Diego
- Occupations: Novelist; short story writer; educator; lecturer
- Spouse: Cheryl
- Parent(s): Carl W. Ritter; Clara Ritter
- Website: www.johnhritter.com

John H. Ritter (born October 31, 1951, San Pedro, California) is an American novelist, short story writer, teacher, and lecturer. He has written six novels and numerous short stories spanning the historical, sports, and sociopolitical genres in the young adult field of literature. His first novel, Choosing Up Sides, published in 1998, won the 1999 International Reading Association Children's Book Award for Older Readers and was designated an American Library Association Best Book for Young Adults. Kirkus Reviews praised Choosing Up Sides, which attacked the once-prevalent views of religious fundamentalists toward left-handed children, as, "No ordinary baseball book, this is a rare first novel." In 2004 Ritter received the Paterson Prize for Books for Young People for his third novel, The Boy Who Saved Baseball.

Ritter's novels have tackled subjects as diverse as the Vietnam War, the war in Iraq, the complexities of exurban land development, jazz fusion, Billy the Kid, the originations of the racial ban against African Americans in Major League Baseball, and the ascension prophecies of 2012. According to Vicki Sherbert, writing in The ALAN Review for the National Council of Teachers of English, Ritter "uses the game of baseball, the glory of music, and the power of the written word to illustrate how young people can overcome everyday, and not-so-everyday, challenges. Each book goes beyond the story of the game, beyond the story of the problem, right to the heart of Ritter's message: What is really valuable in life?"

== Early life ==
Born in San Pedro, California, on October 31, 1951, novelist John H. Ritter grew up in the rural hills of eastern San Diego County. His father, Carl W. Ritter, was a sports writer, and later financial editor, for The San Diego Union newspaper. Ritter's mother, Clara, died of breast cancer, when he was four years old. Ritter recalls, "One thing I remember about my mom is that she sang to us constantly, making up a song for each of her four children that fit our personalities perfectly. So from her, I got a sense of how to capture a person's spirit in a lyrical phrase."

Writing in Dear Author: Letters of Hope, edited by Joan F. Kaywell, Ritter had this to say about his childhood. "When I was very young, my mother died. And my father, who deeply loved her, fell into a deep depression and began to drink heavily. After being left with four young children, my dad feared he would not be able to cope. I learned quite early that when a man drinks, he morphs into someone else. I didn’t like that drinking man. I hated the late-night arguments that filled our house, the screaming, the breaking of furniture, and the many sleepless nights I would lie in bed praying for peace, praying that my father could see the pain he was causing, how he was harming his children with his tirades, and driving the housekeepers away. In the morning, sober again, my dad would return to being the gentle, loving soul I knew him to be. And sometimes it would last all day. But never all week. Before long, I’d see his car roll up the driveway, see him climb out drunk and belligerent, and I would disappear.

"As time went on, my dad did coach our ball teams, and we did have some great times. He even remarried. But he never stopped drinking. Eventually, his second wife divorced him. His children grew up and moved away. And my dad retired into a dark and lonely house."

In an essay which appeared in the 2003 book Making The Match: The Right Book for the Right Reader at the Right Time for all yawl, Ritter again writes about his childhood.

"It was right around that time [1967] when a certain black book fell from heaven into my hands and changed my life. An amazing book—full of crazy characters, of sadness and love, of desperation and revolution, of insight and morality. It was political and poetical, religious and surreptitious. It was a biography of the world and it was pure fiction. I was captivated by it, motivated by it, undressed, unblest, and depressed by it. All that summer, I’d been teaching myself primitive piano, had fancied myself a bluesy, outraged rock star or an actor maybe, or anyone with an audience, anyone with a voice. Then on this one particular hot, dry October afternoon, my older brother left for college and left behind his Bob Dylan Songbook.

"It was long, lean, shiny, and black, a paperback, over a hundred pages full of musical notes and chords and the most surprising poetry I’d ever read. All of a sudden I had a new dream. I tore the baffle off my electric organ, cranked up the tiny Sears and Roebuck mail order amp, and sang that raggedy book from cover to cover, memorizing beat street lyrics, adopting the wail of a moaning man of constant sorrow, a tambourine man, a weather man, only a pawn, only a hobo, but one more is gone, leaving nobody to sing his sad song, and on and on. And I knew what I wanted to be. I would be the storyteller, the historian, the biographer of mixed up, dreamed up characters like these, ‘who push fake morals, insult, and stare, whose money doesn’t talk, it swears.’ Or those who ‘sing in the rat race choir, bent out of shape by society's pliers.’ Characters with eyes, with guts."

Dylan's poems led Ritter to Jack Kerouac's On the Road, then to John Steinbeck's The Grapes of Wrath, "and back again somehow—with different eyes—to Mark Twain's Roughing It. All journey books, all road poems, all the manic panic of romance and motion that a country boy needs."

After high school, Ritter attended the University of California at San Diego. There he played baseball and met his wife, Cheryl, who later became an elementary school teacher in San Diego, where Ritter worked for 25 years as a painting contractor while trying to establish himself as a writer.

== Writing career ==
=== Choosing Up Sides ===
In 1994, Ritter received the Judy Blume Award and a cash grant from the Society of Children's Book Writers and Illustrators (SCBWI) for a novel in progress. In 1996, he submitted his first novel, Choosing Up Sides, through Curtis Brown (literary agents), to Philomel Books, then a division of Penguin Putnam in New York, where the novel became the first acquisition of junior editor, Michael Green. Since then, Green has risen to become editorial director and Publisher of Philomel Books and has edited all six of Ritter's novels.

Choosing Up Sides is set in southern Ohio in the 1920s. The novel's protagonist, 13-year-old Luke Bledsoe, is the oldest child of a preacher. Born left-handed, Luke is, in the eyes of his fundamentalist father, Ezekiel, a heathen and potential follower of Satan, for he believes the left hand is the hand of the devil. The authoritarian Ezekiel tries to "cure" Luke of his left-handedness, but with little luck. When Ezekiel becomes minister of the Holy River of John the Baptist Church in Crown Falls, Ohio, Luke inadvertently becomes involved with the local baseball team, which won the county championship the previous year and hopes to repeat their success. Unfortunately, in addition to viewing left-handedness as a conscious choice, "Pure backwards of what's right and good," Ezekiel also views baseball as a temptation that needs to be resisted, so Luke must practice pitching in secret, by throwing rocks and may apples in the woods. Early on, while Luke is watching a forbidden game, a ball lands at his feet. Throwing it back with his left hand, he amazes the crowd with both distance and placement. The ballplayers and his uncle, Micah, a sports editor for a northern Ohio newspaper, set about convincing Luke that wasting a talent such as his is the actual sin. When Luke decides to pitch for the team, a confrontation with his father ends in a violent beating, which later leads directly to the death of the father, when a crippled Luke is unable to save the man from drowning.

Reviewing Choosing Up Sides, Elizabeth Bush described it in the Bulletin of the Center for Children's Books as a novel that "pits fire and brimstone Fundamentalism against a rival religion—Baseball—and treats both with cathartic understanding." Patricia K. Ladd wrote in The ALAN Review that Ritter "addresses themes of autonomy and independence common to young adult readers and portrays plot through authentic dialect and well-developed characters", and his uses of dialogue, similes, metaphors, and imagery "add dimensions to the plot that leave readers pondering the book's messages long after turning the final page." Dr. Stefani Koorey in her Voice of Youth Advocates review maintained, "Unlike many sports novels, Choosing Up Sides does more than offer a mere glimpse of the grand old game of baseball—it takes a deeper look at faith, truth, and individuality", going on to dub the tale a "well-designed study of personal choice."

For many years, Ritter painted the story the same way book critics did. The IRA Award-winning novel did indeed take a deeper look at faith. As Ritter revealed, nearly ten years later, Choosing Up Sides was actually inspired by a law passed by Colorado voters in 1992 known as Amendment 2 to the Colorado State Constitution, which prohibited enactment or enforcement of anti-discrimination protections for gay, lesbian and bisexual Coloradans. Though later declared unconstitutional by the U.S. Supreme Court, the law's enactment inspired Ritter to search for a metaphorical children's story paralleling the discriminatory amendment and the religious-based beliefs behind it. Responding to a question in a November 17, 2003, interview by Holly Atkins for the St. Petersburg Times, Ritter hints at the book's meaning:

Atkins: "In ‘A Note from the Author’ at the end of Choosing Up Sides you write about where the idea for this novel originated. So although on one level this is a novel about a left-handed future baseball star, it's really about the larger issue of discrimination?"
Ritter: "Yes—and religious-based discrimination, to be specific. That's the hardest prejudice to defeat, since it is delivered bearing a religious righteousness. I remember, as a boy, hearing segregation and racism being justified from the pulpit and I could not comprehend this glaring hypocrisy, totally contrary to what Jesus taught. Only later did I realize that the Bible often gets interpreted and reinterpreted in such a way as to reinforce one's own bigotry and social bias. I think it's important for children to recognize this practice as soon as possible and apply their critical thinking skills to it, since it certainly continues today."

Around the year 2007, Ritter began to sense a cultural shift toward tolerance, even in the most conservative states where his books are most popular, and began testing the waters toward a public disclosure of his true inspiration. In a January 2007 interview in a newsletter published online by Brodart Books, he was asked, "Do you ever feel that the self-given title of ‘baseball novelist’ is inhibiting, that it corners you into one genre?" Ritter responded, "This might be hard to understand, but being called a baseball novelist actually gives me a certain unique freedom among writers. I slip under the radar of an awful lot of people because of that title, and it allows me to reach an audience who would most likely never pick up a book about religious based bigotry [Choosing Up Sides] or the cowardice of war [Over the Wall] or one that demonizes anti-environmental developers [The Boy Who Saved Baseball], and so on, if I didn’t write under the cover of baseball." At this point, Ritter began to openly acknowledge and discuss the metaphorical underpinnings of Choosing Up Sides in schools and conferences across the country.

=== Over the Wall ===
In April 2000, Ritter published his second novel, Over the Wall. Inspired by his sense of outrage at the circumstances surrounding the U.S. Gulf War in the early 1990s and the U.S. bombing of Iraq in 1998, Ritter once again adopted an historical setting in a story about a boy's attempt to reconnect with his father and discover who he is in the process, this time using the "festering wound" of the Vietnam War. "There are many 'walls' in 13-year-old Tyler's life: the literal wall of the baseball field he wants to clear with a mighty slam; the Vietnam Memorial Wall bearing his grandfather's name; and the invisible wall Tyler's dad has built around himself since causing the death of Tyler's sister nine years earlier."

"Beginning with the lines, 'People say time heals all wounds. I used to think so. Now I know better. Time won’t heal anything. Time is nothing but a stack of yesterdays,' Over the Wall is a study not only of one family's case of post-traumatic stress disorder (PTSD), but the collective case of PTSD which Ritter believes the entire nation has suffered ever since the end of the Vietnam War. When young Tyler Waltern is invited to spend the summer in New York City with his cousin, he launches a book-length journey to find out what, if anything, truly will heal his family's wounds. Tyler is determined to make it onto the roster of an all-star baseball team. However, his explosive temper gets in the way of his obvious talent. With the help of his pretty cousin and with the sage advice of his coach, a Vietnam vet who also suffers from PTSD, the young man manages to navigate the risky waters of this passage. In this novel, Ritter parallels the parable of the Good Samaritan to show how, step by daunting step, Tyler's crippling anger dissolves into compassion for the "battered man" who was once his enemy."

"By the end", noted Todd Morning in a review for School Library Journal, "Tyler has gained a level of self-awareness by unraveling some of the tangled stories in his family's past and understanding the intricacies lying beneath the surface of life." A Publishers Weekly reviewer wrote that Ritter "tackles tough subjects relating to violence in sports, religious hypocrisy, and the Vietnam War while creating layers of metaphors which neatly unfold..." and described the novel as a "powerful lesson in compassion." Writing in The ALAN Review, Patricia K. Ladd noted "Readers are left questioning societal mores and values, rules and politics, and their own moral development," and Roger Leslie commented in Booklist that Over the Wall is a "fully fleshed-out story about compassion and absolution."

After publishing two completely different books in time and place, Ritter began to be noticed for his ability to switch writing style and voice at will. His editor at Philomel, Michael Green, told writer Kelly Milner Halls, in an interview on authorial voice for the 2002 Edition of Children's Writer's and Illustrator's Market, that when it comes to voice, "John is a true chameleon."

In the wake of Over the Wall, with its strong anti-war theme, Ritter viewed America's response to the 9/11/2001 events with increasing dismay. Writing in the September 2002 volume of the California English Journal, Ritter stated, "The strain of this past year has been tough on me. After witnessing for days the grand, immediate outpouring of selflessness, generosity, and sacrifice in lower Manhattan—the ‘small friendly town of New York City’ that I celebrated in my recent novel, Over the Wall—I now sit in a blue funk, disappointed in our nation's response and the public outcry for further military retaliation. Discouraged might be a better word. I mean, why do I even bother to write books about empathy and reaching out to others, why do our teachers bother to offer lessons on the same thing, when in crisis, we hunker in survivor mode under a blanket of ethnocentrism, fear, and nationalistic fervor? Seems to me that these were the precise sentiments that drove the hijackers."

=== The Boy Who Saved Baseball ===
Ritter finally met with widespread recognition in 2003 with his third novel, The Boy Who Saved Baseball. In an admitted attempt to lift his spirits, Ritter took on the U.S. Invasion of Iraq by disguising it as an environmental issue and using a lighter and more humorous vein in a work based loosely on Gabriel García Márquez's One Hundred Years of Solitude. Cited in People Magazine as a book to read, "Now that the youngsters have read Harry Potter...", the story centers on Doc Altenheimer, the eccentric octogenarian owner of an apple orchard in Dillontown, California, who is preparing to sell his acres of land—including the town's century-old baseball field—to wealthy outside developers including a banker from Texas in cahoots with a comical and dishonest mayor. After talking with twelve-year-old Tom Gallagher, however, Doc decides to let the fate of his land rest on the outcome of a single baseball game pitting a team of local ballplayers against an all-star squad from a neighboring community. "Do or die," Doc tells the townsfolk. "If our team wins… the town stays the way it is. If they lose, bring on the bulldozers." With the help of a mysterious newcomer, Cruz de la Cruz, Tom convinces a disgraced former major leaguer and social recluse, Dante Del Gato, to whip the Dillontown team into shape. Del Gato's character, Ritter reveals in an interview for the Baker & Taylor book distributor's newsletter, "was partially based on the real life tragic hero, Ken Caminiti, who was a big league MVP and batting champ in the '90s, but struggled with addictions, leaving the game under a cloud, and was dead by age 41."

Once again heralding Ritter's authorial voice, a starred review in Publishers Weekly said the book's prose was "Enthralling...at times stunning," and that, "Ritter delivers a baseball tale of legendary dimension, featuring several larger-than-life characters." Writing in the Summer 2003 edition of The ALAN Review, editor Pamela Sissi Carroll noted, "This uplifting novel is a joy to read and to carry in the mind. Like Ritter's previous novels...[he] addresses the realities that trouble today's teens and the forces that shape and reshape local and national cultures. Yet John H. Ritter's game is unfailingly hopeful and encouragingly positive." Blair Christolon observed in School Library Journal that the work "is peppered with both optimism and dilemmas; it has plenty of play-by-play action, lots of humor, and a triumphant ending."

=== "Baseball in Iraq" ===
Despite the reception and commercial success of The Boy Who Saved Baseball, Ritter could not shake the ever-increasing depression he felt over the suffering caused by the U.S.-led wars in Afghanistan and Iraq and subsequent loss of civil liberties at home. He began to use writing invitations to rail against the violent turn the nation had taken. In an essay published in the Summer 2004 volume of The ALAN Review, he wrote, "The idealistic hopes and dreams for a better America, for a more balanced and peaceful world which guided so many of us in the ‘60s and ‘70s has, in the last three years, evaporated into thunderclouds of arrogance, self-indulgence, anger, and fear."

He used the invitation from editors M. Jerry and Helen Weiss, to contribute a short story to their fantasy anthology, Dreams and Vision, which examines the morality of going to war versus terrorism. The story, "Baseball in Iraq," is a somber depiction of a newly dead American soldier facing a life review by a six-foot-tall rooster and a sympathetic Oklahoma City bomber, Timothy McVeigh. Writing in The Washington Post, longtime Book World reviewer Paul di Filippo states, "Overall, the Weisses exhibit fine taste and editorial restraint, although...their selection of the [clichéd] opening piece is puzzling...But then a challenging story such as John H. Ritter's ‘Baseball in Iraq (Being the True Story of the Ghost of Gunnery Sergeant T. J. McVeigh)’ comes along and dispels all cant and cliché with its elegant portrayal of the reviled terrorist working out his karma."

=== Under the Baseball Moon ===
In a further bid to battle overwhelming personal despair, Ritter chose a somewhat autobiographical skateboarder from a musical family as the focus of his fourth novel, Under the Baseball Moon, to examine the true definition of happiness and success for an artist in the midst of a Faustian bargain: professional good fortune paid for by an overwhelming loss of spirit and joy.

Reviewers reacted positively. According to a starred review in Kirkus, Under the Baseball Moon was "...a work that is far beyond the ordinary. It's about music and softball, dreams and passion, courage and loyalty and mysticism. The characters are eccentric and dynamic... Even the language is multi-layered, mixing music, sport and street talk with soaring imagery." In a starred review in Booklist, writer Bill Ott noted that "Ritter pulls out all the stops in his myth-heavy plot, but what really makes the book soar is his sense of place: the laid-back, hippie-influenced, communal spirit of OB permeates every scene, offering stark contrast to the coldly commercial world toward which Andy aspires. As in his earlier work, Ritter melds style to content beautifully, telling his story in a hip, street-smart argot that perfectly matches Andy's trumpet improvisations. Teen friendly, lots of fun, never preachy, but with plenty of thematic pizzazz," and a Publishers Weekly contributor noted that "Ritter's dialogue crackles with the rhythms of the funky California setting, and Andy's passion and ambition give the novel its heartbeat."

In the novel, Andy Ramos, a skilled trumpeter who hopes to revolutionize the music scene with his band's fusion of Latin jazz, rock, and hip-hop, finds himself strangely drawn to Glory Martinez, a childhood rival and talented softball pitcher who has returned to the neighborhood. Andy and Glory soon discover that their talents peak when they perform together, but when a mysterious benefactor promises to launch Andy's musical career, he agrees to walk away from his budding romance.

Asked whether there were any autobiographical characterizations in his work, Ritter said, "Andy Ramos, the main character in Under the Baseball Moon, is fairly autobiographical. I wrote tons of songs and dreamed of making it big in the rock world from age 15 to 22. His father, though, is closer to who I am today in his approach to life and his view of the entertainment industry's customary habit of reining in and ‘branding the maverick’ of talented, rising stars whom they deem as being too far out creatively."

Questioning the uniqueness of the characters in the novel, the interviewer commented to Ritter that in Under the Baseball Moon, "Glory Martinez is a handful. It seems like she stepped out of a Joyce Carol Oates novel. Can you elaborate on why she had such a tough upbringing and still comes across with charm and drive? She is one of the more intriguing characters I’ve come across in recent YA literature." Ritter replied that he sees her charm "as being hard-won through a conscious decision she made a few years before the book begins...I know from personal experience how hard it is to grow up happy and somewhat normal in a single parent home when that parent is an alcoholic. As you get older, though, you have a choice, and it can go one of two ways. Either you become your antagonistic, anti-social parent and repeat his mistakes or, by watching and suffering through his failures, you become the opposite. Of those two choices, Glory made the healthy one, which, as you say, is quite unusual in YA literature. But kids in Glory's situation do occasionally develop a desire to dream big, coupled with the drive to succeed, and I find this rare character far more fun and interesting to write about than the typical."

During the 2006 Florida Council of Teachers of English Convention in Orlando, Florida, FCTE President, Dr. Virginia White, presented Ritter with the President's Award for "significant contribution to the teaching of English in the state of Florida" citing the literary value of his books and the positive impact they had on the teaching of literature in Florida schools. >

=== The Desperado Who Stole Baseball ===
Ritter's fifth novel, The Desperado Who Stole Baseball, set in the Wild West of the 1880s and written in the manner of a tall tale mixed with Mexican style magical realism, is a prequel to The Boy Who Saved Baseball and Book One of the Dillontown Trilogy. On his way from St. Louis to Dillontown to find his long-lost uncle, the playing-manager of a championship baseball team, twelve-year-old Jack Dillon meets Billy the Kid, who is looking for a fresh start in California. Upon his arrival, Jack learns that the Dillontown Nine have scheduled a game against the powerful Chicago White Stockings, with the town's fortune hanging in the balance. Again, Ritter's voice caused critics to react. In the Bulletin of the Center for Children's Books, Elizabeth Bush described Ritter's authorial voice as having "all the charm of a well-spun tall tale with plenty of Twainian malarkey." Marilyn Taniguchi asserted in School Library Journal that "Ritter writes in an idiom-laden, mock-epic style full of bombast and bravado...Reminiscent of Sid Fleischman."

Of significance is the Author's Note included in the paperback edition (Puffin 2010) revealing Ritter's inspiration. The "Desperado" of the title is not Billy the Kid, but a Major League Baseball owner, William Hulbert, who along with Albert Spalding and Cap Anson, added impetus to the movement to "steal" baseball from African American players, a little known fact in baseball lore, yet one Ritter believed showed a character even more nefarious: "Others would also tend to downplay baseball's racial divide, as personified by the management of these Chicago White Stockings (later to become the Chicago Cubs). I was not about to do that, having worked on the manuscript from early 2007 to June 2008, paralleling the launch and quixotic presidential quest of a mixed-race U.S. Senator and dedicated Chicago White Sox fan. And yes, as I note, Long John Dillon did stand up once and say, "For the first time in my life, I am proud to be a part of this land."—a sentiment I heard echoed across this beautiful nation repeatedly as I penned this tome. And in those moments I found hope and grace."

Among critics, the book received virtually no comments alluding to the novel's racial thrust. Only Ian Chipman, reviewing the work in Booklist, noted that The Desperado Who Stole Baseball provided "a good child's eye introduction to baseball's segregated past."

=== Fenway Fever ===
Ritter's sixth novel, Fenway Fever, a book his publisher describes as "another magical novel that celebrates teamwork—and the innate power to heal that even the least among us is born with," is scheduled to be released on April 12, 2012, to coincide with the 100 year anniversary of Fenway Park in Boston, Massachusetts.

Ritter is currently working on a utopian novel, 2020 Vision, premised on the changes American society must go through after a floodgate of top-secret disclosures occur upon the release of undisputed evidence of U.S. Government participation in the events of September 11, 2001.

== Bibliography ==
=== Novels ===
- Choosing Up Sides (2000)
- Over the Wall (2000)
- The Boy Who Saved Baseball (2003)
- Under the Baseball Moon (2006)
- The Desperado Who Stole Baseball (2009)
- Fenway Fever (2012)

=== Contributions to Anthologies ===
- "Old School/Fu-Char Skool" in Big City Cool: Short Stories about Urban Youth, edited by M. Jerry Weiss and Helen S. Weiss, Persea Books, 2002.
- "My Life as a Reader in a Stolen Moment Talkin’ Blues" in Making the Match: The Right Book for the Right Reader at the Right Time, edited by Teri S. Lesesne, Stenhouse Publishers, 2003.
- "Baseball in Iraq" in Dreams and Visions: Fourteen Flights of Fancy, edited by M. Jerry Weiss and Helen S. Weiss, Starscape, 2006.
- "Dear Mr. John H. Ritter" in Dear Author: Letters of Hope, edited by Joan F. Kaywell, Philomel Books, 2007.
- "Baseball Crazy" in Baseball Crazy: Ten Short Stories that Cover All the Bases, edited by Nancy E. Mercado, Dial Books, 2008.
- "Tunnel Vision" in This Family Is Driving Me Crazy: Ten Stories about Surviving Your Family edited by M. Jerry Weiss and Helen S. Weiss, G.P. Putnam's Sons, 2009.
