= De La Cruz (band) =

Australian hard rock band

- Origin: Australia
- Genres: Glam metal, hard rock
- Years active: 2011–2014
- Label: Frontiers Records
- Members: Roxxi Catalano; Lacey Lane; Rory Joy; Stevie Strange
- Past members: Casey Jones; Dennis Jaculli; Grant Daniell
- Website: delacruzofficial.com

De La Cruz were a 5-piece Australian hard rock band, founded in 2011 on the Gold Coast, Australia.

== History ==
De La Cruz were formed in mid-2011 by Australian guitarist and Kramer Guitars endorsee Casey Jones, and Auckland, New Zealand born vocalist Roxxi Catalano. The band recruited Melbourne based drummer Lacey Lane, Brisbane Guitarist Rory Joy and local bass player Dennis Jaculli.

They recorded a self-funded and online released Self Titled E.P in October 2011 along with a video clip for the track 'Lust Fame Money'. The release of this E.P led to a full page article and album review in Classic Rock AOR Magazine. Track No. 1 'Good As It Gets' was featured on Episode 1, Season 6 of hit U.S television show Dexter. Shortly after release of the E.P, bassist Dennis 'Jakki' Jaculli left the band and was replaced by local Brisbane based muso Grant Daniell.

In mid-2012 the band signed a multi-album recording contract with European Record Label Frontiers Records and began work on their debut full-length album.

== Street Level ==
Street Level was the full-length debut album from De La Cruz, released in Japan on 6 March 2013 and globally on 22 March 2013, featuring 12 tracks (the Japanese version includes bonus track "De la cruz"). This was the band's first release on Frontiers Records. The album went on to gain critical acclaim both in Classic Rock Magazine and in numerous online zines and sites. A video clip was released for the song "Cherry Bomb", track No. 6 on Street Level.

In April 2013, shortly after the album release, lead-guitarist and formative member Casey Jones announced he would be leaving De La Cruz permanently citing disillusion with the music industry as a contributing factor. In the wake of this, vocalist Roxxi Catalano informed fans that a new guitarist would be sourced in time and that the sonic trademark and dynamic of the band would not be changed. After a few months hiatus, De La Cruz announced on 25 July 2013 that they had found a replacement for Jones, in the Sydney-based guitarist, Stevie Strange.

On 14 October 2013, bassist Grant Daniell decided to separate from the band for personal reasons. They announced on 24 March that they were splitting up. Their Facebook page still exists, occasionally posting updates on the members' musical careers.

== Past members ==
- Roxxi Catalano – vocals (2011–2014)
- Rory "R.J" Joy – guitar, backing vocals (2011–2014)
- Lacey Lane – drums, backing vocals (2011–2014)
- Casey Jones – guitar, backing vocals (2011–2013)
- Dennis "Jakki" Jaculli – bass guitar, backing vocals (2011)
- Grant Daniell – bass guitar, backing vocals (2011–2013)
- Stevie Strange – guitar, backing vocals (2013–2014)

== Discography ==
=== Albums ===
- De La Cruz EP (2011)
- Street Level (2013)
