= Maria Margaretha van Os =

Dutch painter

- Born: November 15, 1779; The Hague, Netherlands
- Died: November 17, 1862 (aged 83); The Hague, Netherlands
- Known for: Painting

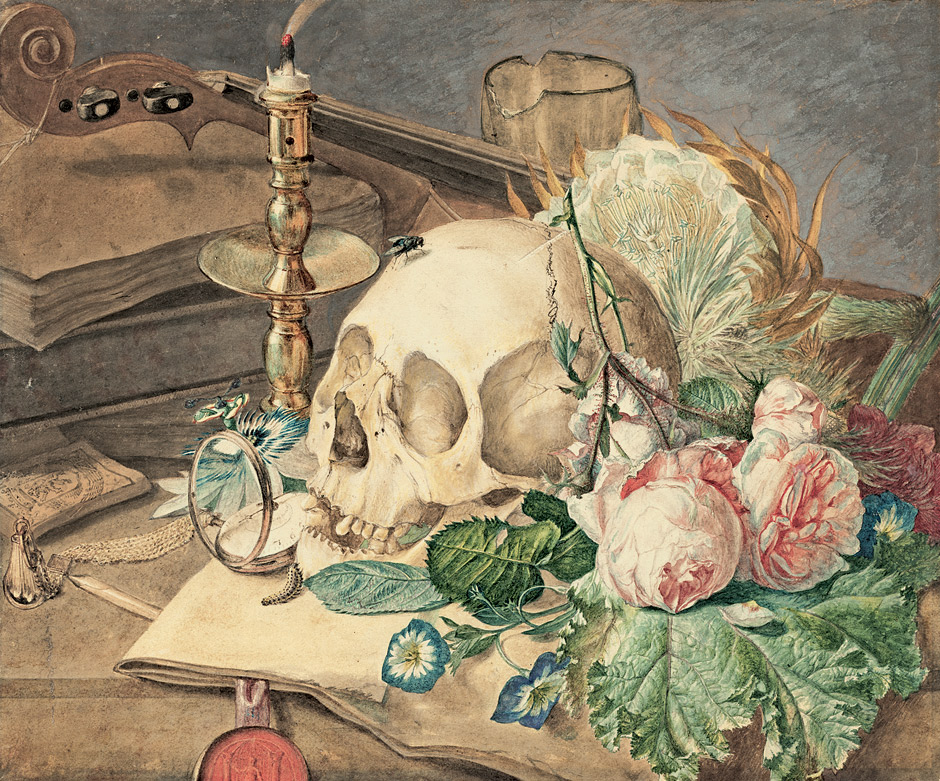
Vanitas

Maria Margaretha van Os (November 15, 1779 – November 17, 1862), was a 19th-century flower painter from the Netherlands.

== Biography ==
She was born in The Hague as the daughter of the painters Jan van Os and Susanna de la Croix. She was the younger sister of Pieter Gerardus van Os and became the older sister of Georgius Jacobus Johannes van Os and Pieter Frederik van Os. Like her brothers, she was a pupil of her parents; her father was a landscape and still-life artist and her mother made pastel portraits. She is known for fruit and flower still lifes. From 1826 she was an honorary member of the Koninklijke Academie voor Beeldende Kunsten in Amsterdam. She died in The Hague.
