= Fernando de la Cruz =

Dominican baseball player (born 1971)

- Pitcher
- Born: January 25, 1971 (age 55); La Romana, Dominican Republic
- Batted: Right Threw: Right

Professional debut
- CPBL: 2001, for the Uni-President Lions
- NPB: 1999, for the Osaka Kintetsu Buffaloes

Last appearance
- CPBL: 2001, for the Uni-President Lions
- NPB: 1999, for the Osaka Kintetsu Buffaloes

CPBL statistics
- Win–loss record: 2–2
- Earned run average: 4.23
- Strikeouts: 8

NPB statistics
- Win–loss record: 0–1
- Earned run average: 4.50
- Strikeouts: 1
- Stats at Baseball Reference

Teams
- Osaka Kintetsu Buffaloes (1999); Uni-President Lions (2001)

Fernando de la Cruz (Note: His name often appeared as Fernando DeLaCruz in newspaper reports.) (born January 25, 1971) is a Dominican former professional baseball pitcher. He played in various professional baseball leagues between 1995 and 2013. Listed at 6 feet 0 inches (1.83 m) and 225 pounds (102 kg), he threw and batted right-handed.

== Career ==
De la Cruz was born in La Romana, Dominican Republic. He played in Minor League Baseball from 1995 to 2003, primarily for farm teams of the California Angels / Anaheim Angels. He played in two games at the Triple-A level, in 2003 while in the Detroit Tigers organization. De la Cruz played one game in Japan for the Osaka Kintetsu Buffaloes of Nippon Professional Baseball (NPB) in 1999, and seven games in Taiwan for the Uni-President Lions of the Chinese Professional Baseball League (CPBL) in 2001.

De la Cruz did not play professionally in 2004. He briefly played in the Atlantic League of Professional Baseball in 2005, and played in the Mexican League from 2005 through 2008. He played several seasons in the Dominican Professional Baseball League (LIDOM), last playing professionally during the 2012–2013 winter season.

Overall, de la Cruz played professionally for 16 seasons, appearing in 377 total games (44 starts) while accruing a 5.26 earned run average (ERA) and a record of 36–41 with 92 saves and striking out 398 batters in 650 innings pitched.
