= Georgius Jacobus Johannes van Os =

Dutch painter

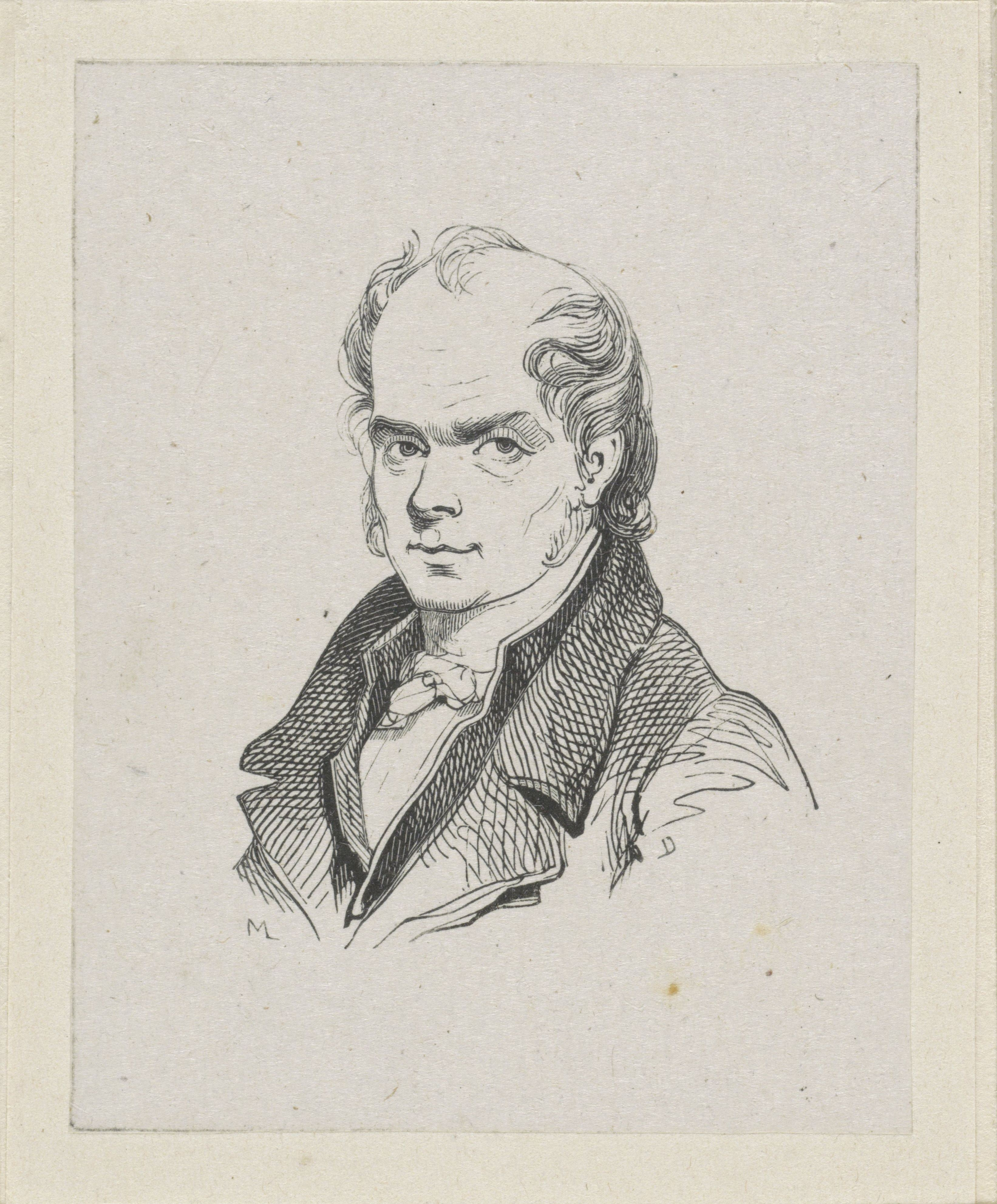
G. J. J. van Os

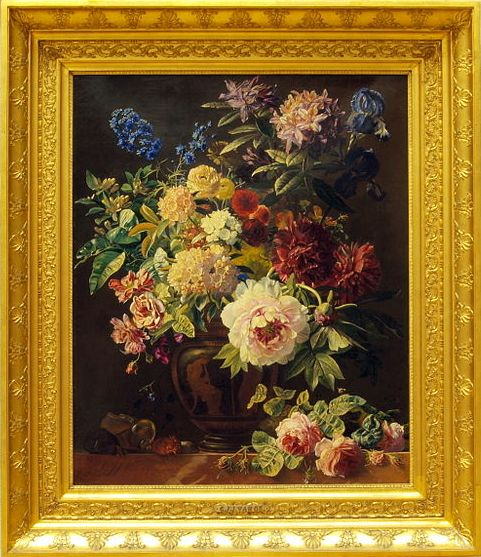
Still life in a vase, 1821, collection Teylers Museum

Georgius Jacobus Johannes van Os (20 November 1782 The Hague – 11 July 1861 Paris), was a 19th-century painter from the Netherlands.

== Biography ==
According to the RKD he was a son and pupil of the painters Jan van Os and Susanna de la Croix, and a brother of the painters Pieter van Os and Maria Margaretha van Os. In 1809 he won the first prize of the Society Felix Meritis in Amsterdam for a still life in which genre he later specialized. Van Os became Ridder in de orde van de Nederlandse Leeuw in 1812. From 1816 to 1820 he worked in Amsterdam. In 1822 he moved to Paris, where he worked for the Sèvres porcelain factory. He painted landscapes, but was, like his father, best known as a painter of flowers. Starting in the 1830s he spent his summers in Haarlem, where he continued working on flower illustrations for the "Flora Batava" edited by Jan Kops.

He is not to be confused with the son of his brother Pieter, also a painter called Georgius Jacobus Johannes van Os, but who lived from 1805 to 1841 and continued the family painting tradition.

Media related to Paintings by Georgius Jacobus Johannes van Os at Wikimedia Commons
