= Michel Delacroix (painter) =

French painter in the "naif" style

Michel Delacroix (French pronunciation: [miʃɛl dəlakʁwa]; born 1933) is a French painter in the "naïf" style.

== Biography ==
Delacroix was born in Paris. He studied at the Lycee Louis-le-Grand. He has had one man shows as well as group exhibitions in Europe. Delacroix's primitive style in his paintings and graphics combine structure and detail with rich colour to convey the bustling, diverse activity of the streets of Paris.

Delacroix's subjects include street scenes of Paris and other nearby areas of France set during his childhood during the Nazi occupation; he was only seven years old at the time. He is the father of French painter Fabienne Delacroix. He is also the father of the late Bertrand Delacroix (1965–2015) who opened fine art galleries in New York City and Boston which represent his father's work.

Delacroix had an exhibition entitled Le Temps Retrouvé at Axelle Fine Arts Galerie in New York City which opened on December 5, 2015.

== General references ==
- Hackenberg, D. Michel Delacroix. 1st. Hackenberg Inc., 2007.
