= Susanna de la Croix =

Dutch artist (1755–1789)

Susanna de La Croix
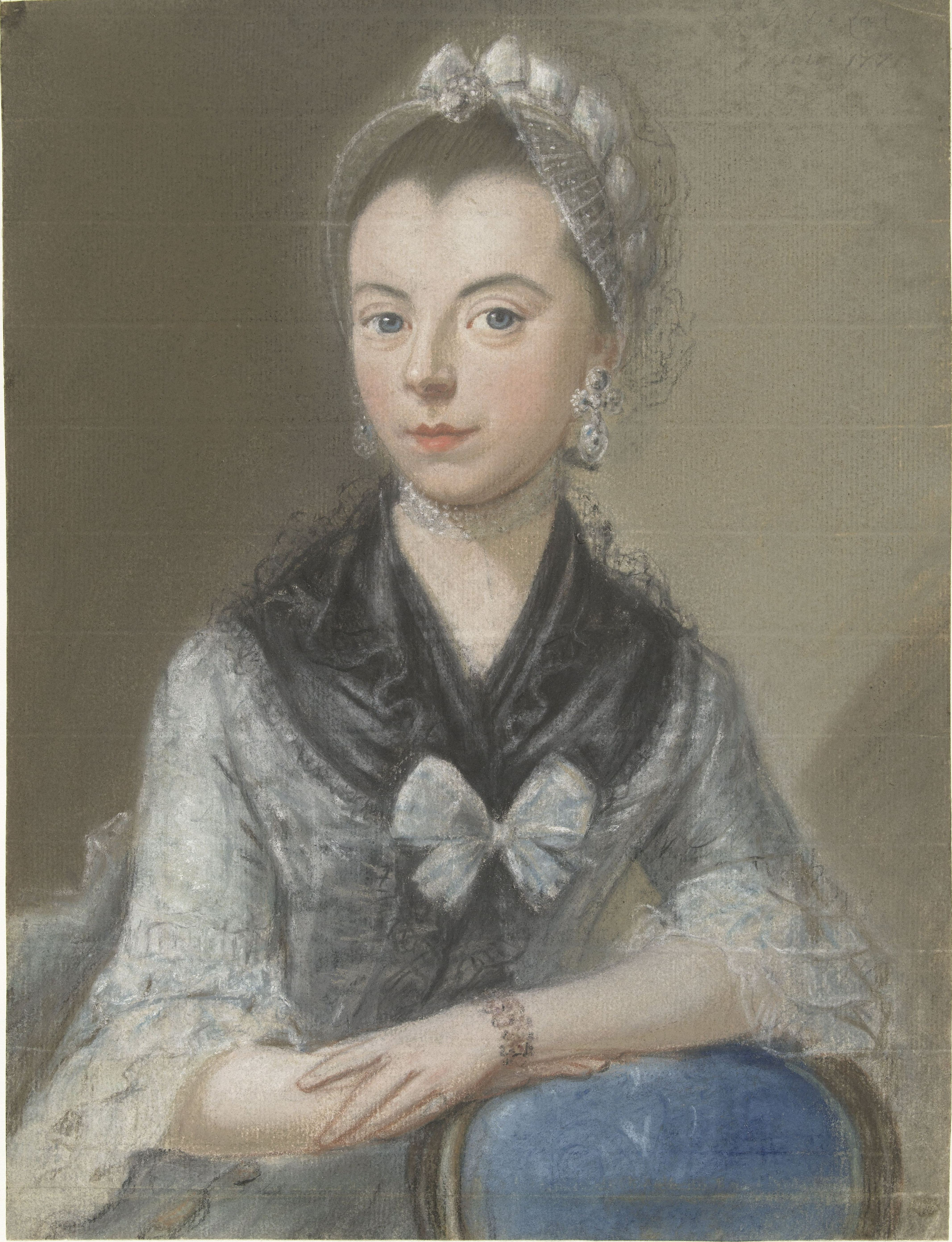
- Born: 1755; Amsterdam
- Died: 1789 (aged 33–34); The Hague

Susanna de La Croix (1755–1789) was a Dutch painter.

De la Croix was baptized on 3 January 1756 in the Oude Waalse Kerk in Amsterdam as Susanne, daughter of French painter Pierre Frédéric de la Croix and Marie Regnier. The family lived alternately in Amsterdam and The Hague. In 1775, she married the painter and poet Jan van Os (1744–1808) in The Hague. From this marriage seven children were born, among whom Pieter Gerardus (1776–1839), Maria Margaretha (1780–1862) and Georgius Jacobus Johannes van Os (1782–1861), who also became painters.

De la Croix was probably trained by her father. She made "excellent portraits with black chalk", among other things. Scheen states that she was deaf-mute. It is known that her father was deaf-mute but the assumption that she would also be is probably a mistake following a mention at Van Eynden and Van der Willigen. In their Geschiedenis der Vaderlandsche Schilderkunst they write: "Susanna de la Croix, who was the daughter of the painter of that name, who has made herself known through the manufacture of a number of crayon portraits, and who is deaf-mute." The text was later quoted by Kramm, who in turn became the source for Scheen's mention. A portrait of an old woman in the collection of the Rijksmuseum Amsterdam is assigned to Susanna de la Croix, but it is dated a few years after her death.

De la Croix died of smallpox at the age of 33, and was buried in the Nieuwe Kerk in The Hague.
