= Pieter van Os =

Dutch painter

Pieter Gerardus van Os
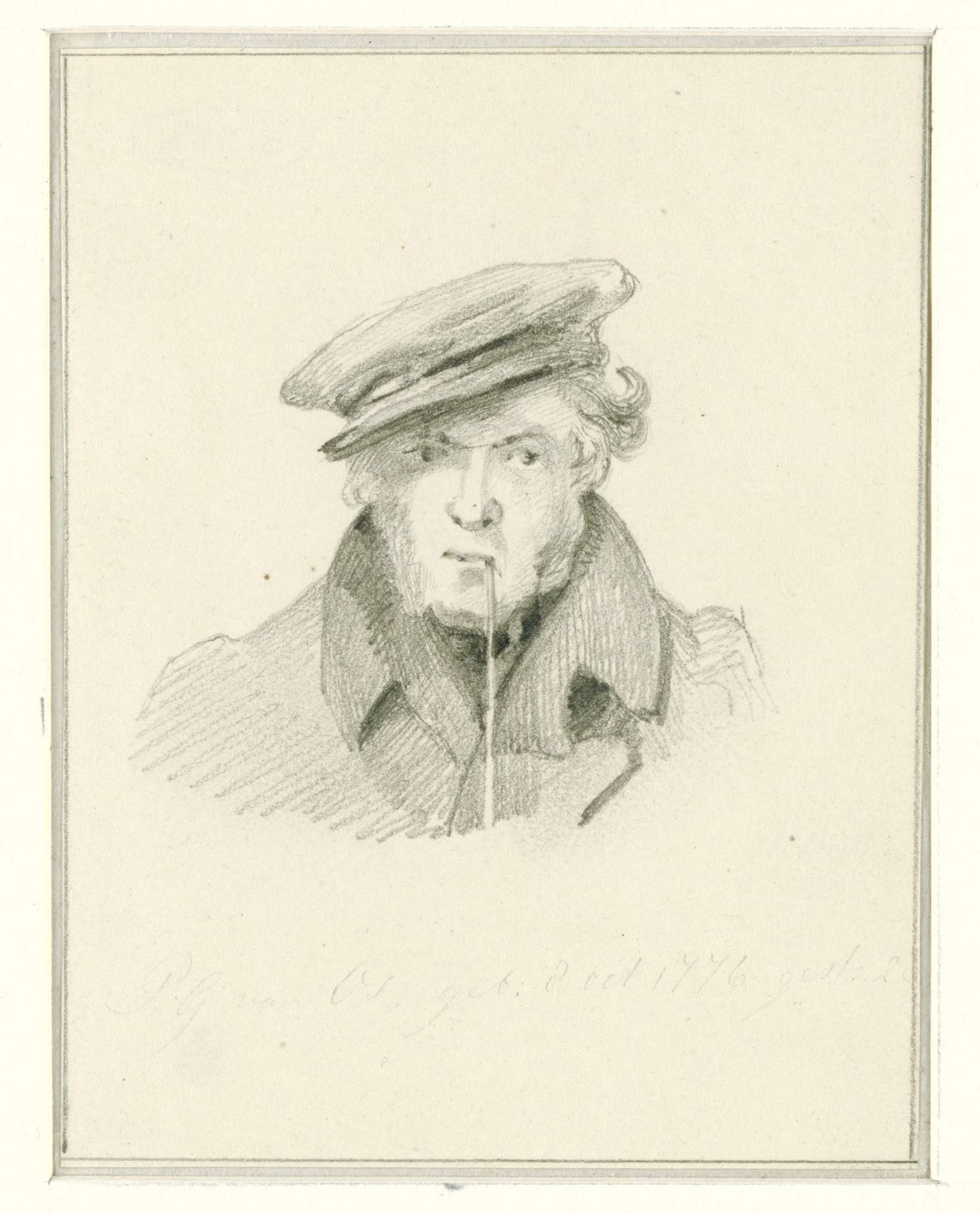
- Pieter Gerardus van Os, self-portrait
- Born: 8 October 1776; The Hague
- Died: 28 March 1839 (aged 62)
- Known for: Painting

Pieter Gerardus van Os (8 October 1776 – 28 March 1839) was a Dutch painter and engraver and a member of the renowned Van Os family of artists.

Van Os was born in The Hague the son of Jan van Os. He studied with his father and from 1794 to 1795 at the Tekenakademie in The Hague. During this period he copied paintings from the works by Paulus Potter and Charles Dujardin. Van Os was particularly fond of animals as his subject matter and made such an excellent copy of one of Potter's works - Young Bull - that it was purchased by William V, Prince of Orange.

After completing his training, he departed for Amsterdam, where he supported himself primarily by painting rather mediocre portrait miniatures and giving drawing lessons. Around 1805 he began to devote himself to producing landscape paintings filled with his favourite subject of cattle and was still strongly influenced by the 17th-century Dutch masters. In 1808, his Hilly Landscape with Cattle (untraced) won the prize provided by King Louis Bonaparte for the best landscape at the first public exhibition of Dutch contemporary art in Amsterdam.

In 1813 and 1814 he trained as a captain of volunteers and experienced military engagements. This led him to try military subjects in his art. Emperor Alexander I of Russia purchased a picture in this theme by Van Os and placed it in his palace at St. Petersburg. Van Os became a fourth class member of the Royal Institute of the Netherlands in 1820. Van Os died in the Hague in 1839.

His son Pieter Frederik van Os (1808–1892) became a painter and teacher who taught Anton Mauve among others.

Selected artwork

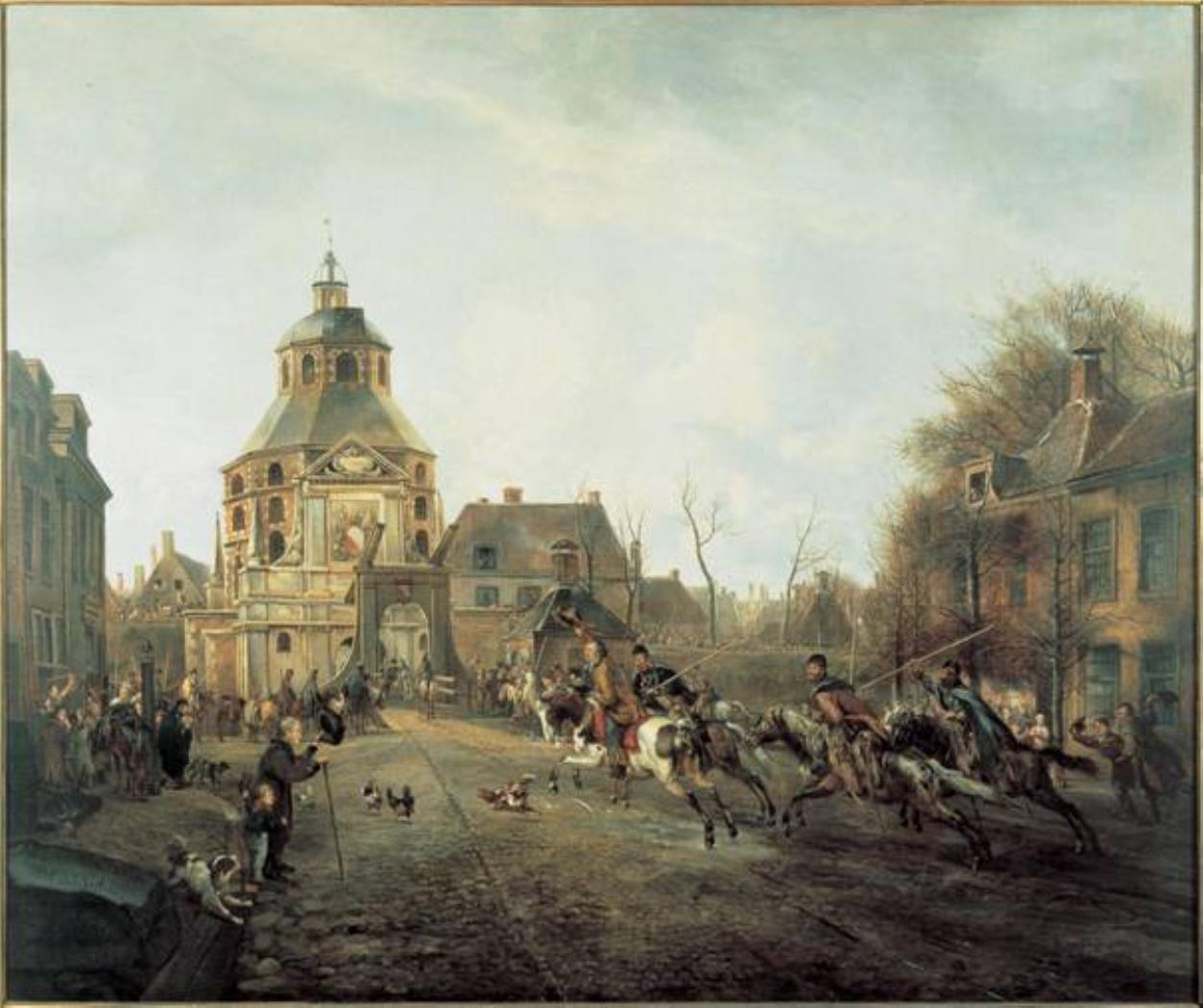
The Wittevrouwenpoort at the time of the arrival of the Cossacks in Utrecht, 1813 (1816)

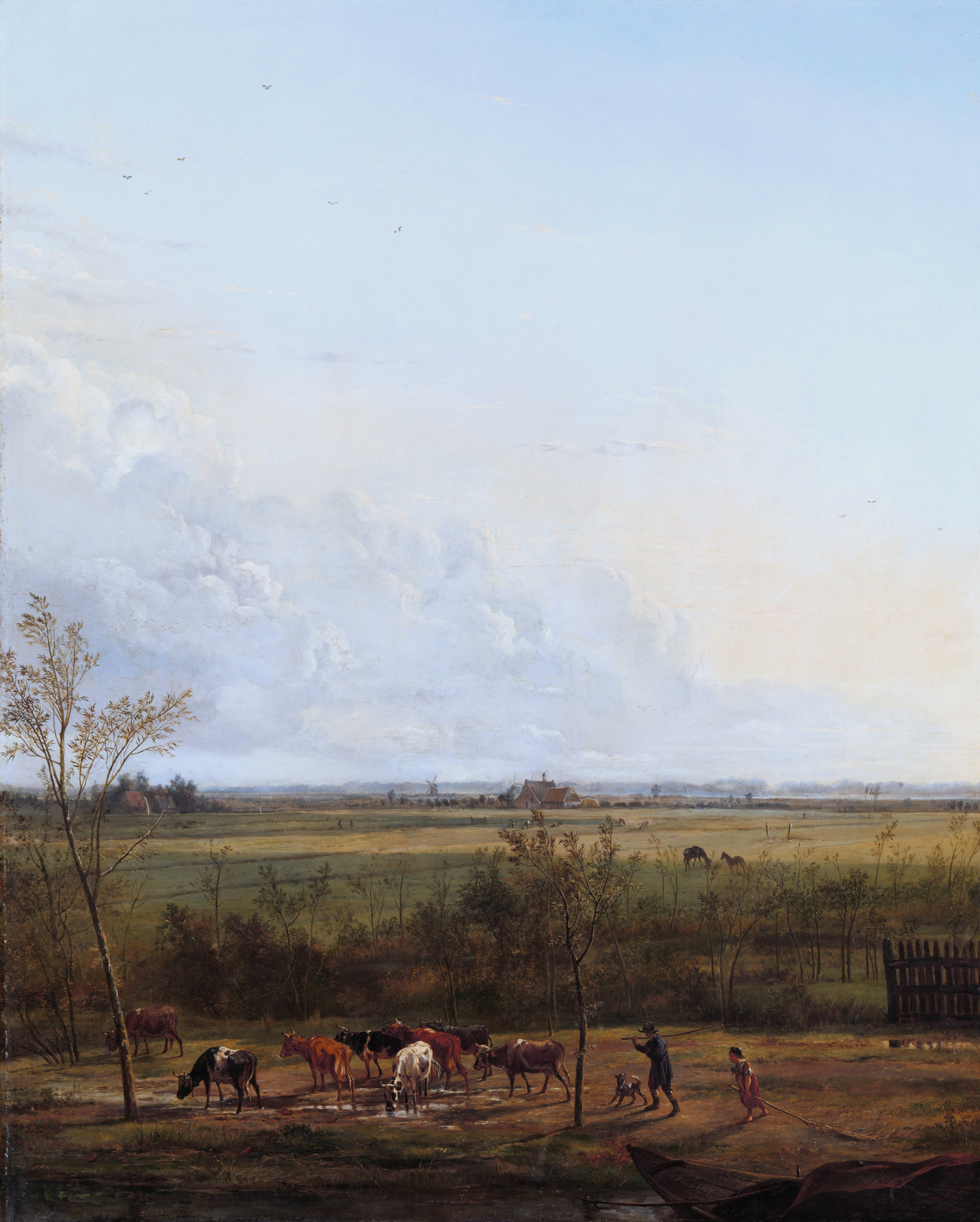
Vergezicht over de weiden bij 's-Graveland (1817)

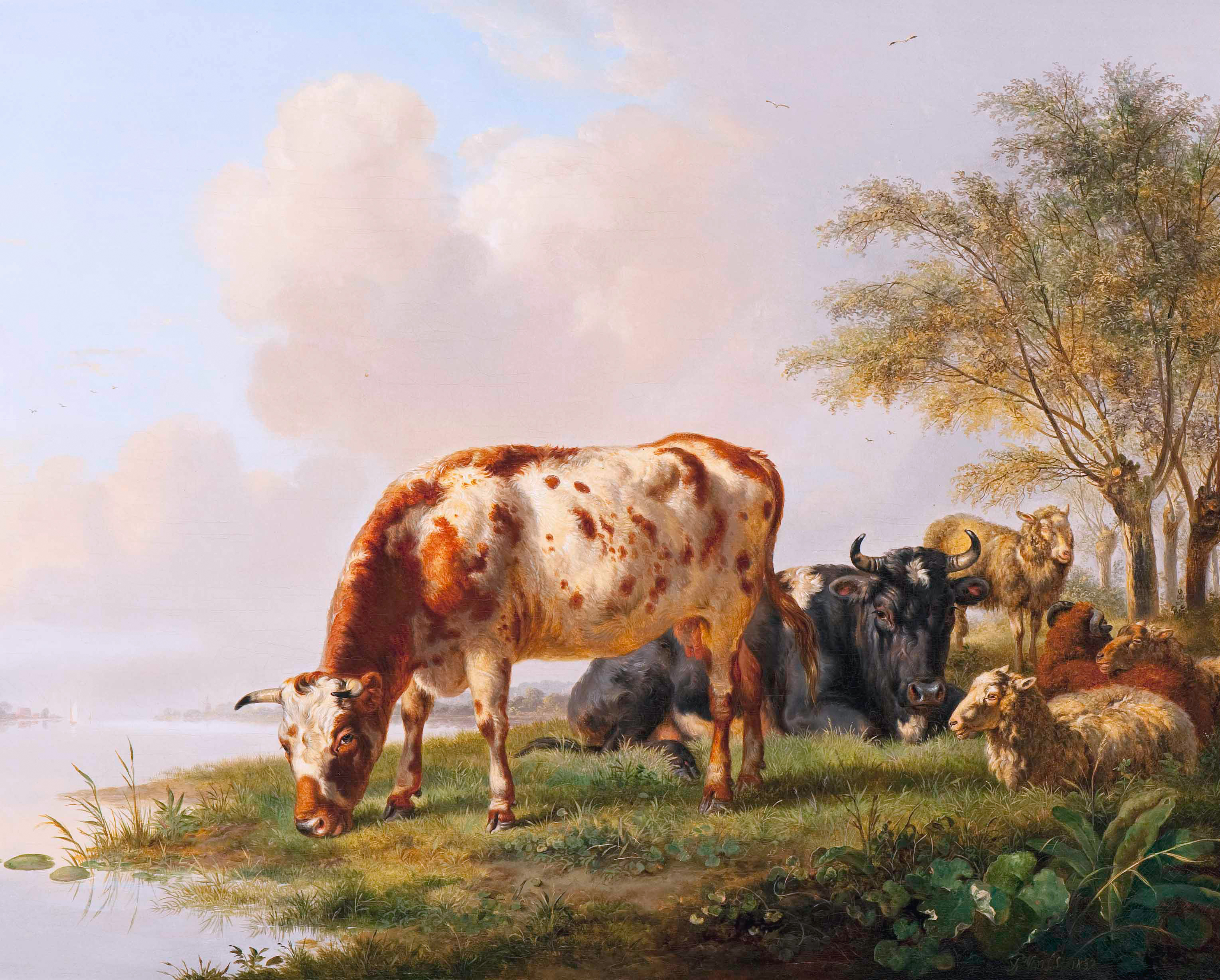
Cows and sheep at the river bank (1832)
