= List of members of the Chamber of Representatives of Belgium, 2024–present =

Belgian Parliament in 2024

This is a list of members of the Chamber of Representatives of Belgium during the 56th legislature (2024–). These Members of Parliament were elected in the 2024 Belgian federal election.

== MPs ==
=== New Flemish Alliance ===
MP	Constituency
Peter Buysrogge	East Flanders
Mireille Colson	Antwerp
Dorien Cuylaerts	Antwerp
Christoph D'Haese	East Flanders
Maaike De Vreese	West Flanders
Sophie De Wit	Antwerp
Bart De Wever	Antwerp
Peter De Roover	Antwerp
Jean-Marie Dedecker	West Flanders
Eva Demesmaeker	Flemish Brabant
Kathleen Deporter	East Flanders
Theo Francken	Flemish Brabant
Michael Freilich	Antwerp
Frieda Gijbels	Limburg
Koen Metsu	Antwerp
Lotte Peeters	East Flanders
Wouter Raskin	Limburg
Axel Ronse	West Flanders
Darya Safai	Flemish Brabant
Anneleen Van Bossuyt	East Flanders
Kristien Van Vaerenbergh	Flemish Brabant
Steven Vandeput	Limburg
Charlotte Verkeyn	West Flanders
Bert Wollants	Antwerp

=== Vlaams Belang ===
MP	Constituency
Katleen Bury	Flemish Brabant
Ortwin Depoortere	East Flanders
Marijke Dillen	Antwerp
Britt Huybrechts	Flemish Brabant
Dieter Keuten	Limburg
Kurt Moons	Flemish Brabant
Barbara Pas	East Flanders
Annick Ponthier	Limburg
Kurt Ravyts	West Flanders
Ellen Samyn	Antwerp
Werner Somers	East Flanders
Dominiek Spinnewyn-Sneppe	West Flanders
Frank Troosters	Limburg
Francesca Van Belleghem	East Flanders
Alexander Van Hoecke	East Flanders
Reccino Van Lommel	Antwerp
Sam Van Rooy	Antwerp
Kristien Verbelen	West Flanders
Lode Vereeck	Antwerp
Wouter Vermeersch	West Flanders

=== Reformist Movement ===
MP	Constituency
Daniel Bacquelaine	Liège
Georges-Louis Bouchez	Hainaut
David Clarinval	Namur
Hervé Cornillie	Hainaut
Michel De Maegd	Brussels
Charlotte Deborsu	Namur
Catherine Delcourt	Liège
Denis Ducarme	Hainaut
Anthony Dufrane	Hainaut
Gilles Foret	Liège
Valérie Glatigny	Brussels
Philippe Goffin	Liège
Youssef Handichi	Brussels
Pierre-Yves Jeholet	Liège
Mathieu Michel	Walloon Brabant
Benoît Piedboeuf	Luxembourg
Florence Reuter	Walloon Brabant
Vincent Scourneau	Walloon Brabant
Julie Taton	Hainaut

=== Socialist Party ===
MP	Constituency
Khalil Aouasti	Brussels
Hugues Bayet	Hainaut
Ridouane Chahid	Brussels
Philippe Close	Brussels
Philippe Courard	Luxembourg
Frédéric Daerden	Liège
Ludivine Dedonder	Hainaut
Pierre-Yves Dermagne	Namur
Caroline Désir	Brussels
Christophe Lacroix	Liège
Dimitri Legasse	Walloon Brabant
Paul Magnette	Hainaut
Marie Meunier	Hainaut
Lydia Mutyebele Ngoi	Brussels
Patrick Prévot	Hainaut
Sophie Thémont	Liège
Éric Thiébaut	Hainaut

=== Workers' Party of Belgium ===
MP	Constituency
Kemal Bilmez	Flemish Brabant
Nabil Boukili	Brussels
Roberto d'Amico	Hainaut
Greet Daems	Antwerp
Kim De Witte	Limburg
Natalie Eggermont	West Flanders
Raoul Hedebouw	Liège
Farah Jacquet	Namur
Sofie Merckx	Hainaut
Peter Mertens	Antwerp
Nadia Moscufo	Liège
Julien Ribaudo	Brussels
Robin Tonniau	East Flanders
Annik Van den Bosch	Brussels
Ayse Yigit	Hainaut

=== Les Engagés ===
MP	In replacement of	Circonscription
Jean-Luc Crucke		Hainaut
Xavier Dubois	Yves Coppieters	Walloon Brabant
Luc Frank		Liège
Jean-Francois Gatelier		Hainaut
Isabelle Hansez		Liège
Pierre Kompany		Brussels
Stéphane Lasseaux		Namur
Benoît Lutgen		Luxembourg
Vanessa Matz		Liège
Ismaël Nuino	Élisabeth Degryse	Brussels
Anne Pirson		Namur
Maxime Prévot		Namur
Carmen Ramlot	Valérie Lescrenier	Luxembourg
Aurore Tourneur		Hainaut

=== Vooruit ===
Name	Constituency
Jinnih Beels	Antwerp
Jan Bertels	Antwerp
Melissa Depraetere	West Flanders
Fatima Lamarti	Flemish Brabant
Annick Lambrecht	West Flanders
Brent Meuleman	East Flanders
Funda Oru	Limburg
Oskar Seuntjens	Antwerp
Jeroen Soete	West Flanders
Frank Vandenbroucke	Flemish Brabant
Joris Vandenbroucke	East Flanders
Anja Vanrobaeys	East Flanders
Alain Yzermans	Limburg

=== Christian Democratic and Flemish ===
Name	Constituency
Franky Demon	West Flanders
Nawal Farih	Limburg
Tine Gielis	Antwerp
Leentje Grillaert	East Flanders
Sammy Mahdi	Flemish Brabant
Steven Matheï	Limburg
Nathalie Muylle	West Flanders
Koen Van den Heuvel	Antwerp
Els Van Hoof	Flemish Brabant
Vincent Van Peteghem	East Flanders
Annelies Verlinden	Antwerp

=== Open Flemish Liberals and Democrats ===
Name	Constituency
Alexia Bertrand	Brussels
Steven Coenegrachts	Limburg
Alexander De Croo	East Flanders
Irina De Knop	Flemish Brabant
Katja Gabriëls	East Flanders
Vincent Van Quickenborne	West Flanders
Paul Van Tigchelt	Antwerp
Kjell Vander Elst	Flemish Brabant

=== DéFI ===
Name	Constituency
François De Smet	Brussels
