= East Flanders (Chamber of Representatives constituency) =

Parliamentary constituency in Belgium

- Oost-Vlaanderen; Flandre-Orientale; Ostflandern
- Constituency for the Chamber of Representatives
- Location of East Flanders within Belgium
- Province: East Flanders
- Region: Flanders
- Population: 1,602,532 (2025)
- Electorate: 1,182,578 (2024)
- Area: 3,007 km^{2} (2024)

Current Constituency
- Created: 2003
- Seats: 20 (2003–present)
- Members: List: Peter Buysrogge (NV-A); Alexander De Croo (Open Vld); Kathleen Depoorter (NV-A); Ortwin Depoortere (VB); Petra De Sutter (Groen); Christoph D'Haese (NV-A); Katja Gabriëls (Open Vld); Leentje Grillaert (CD&V); Brent Meuleman (Vooruit); Barbara Pas (VB); Lotte Peeters (NV-A); Werner Somers (VB); Niels Tas (Vooruit); Robin Tonniau (PVDA); Lieve Truyman (NV-A); Francesca Van Belleghem (VB); Stefaan Van Hecke (Groen); Alexander Van Hoecke (VB); Phaedra Van Keymolen (CD&V); Anja Vanrobaeys (Vooruit)
- Created from: List: Aalst-Oudenaarde; Dendermonde-Sint-Niklaas; Ghent-Eeklo

East Flanders (Dutch: Oost-Vlaanderen; French: Flandre-Orientale; German: Ostflandern) is one of the 11 multi-member constituencies of the Chamber of Representatives, the lower house of the Belgian Federal Parliament, the national legislature of Belgium. The constituency was established in 2003 following the re-organisation of constituencies across Belgium along provincial lines. It is conterminous with the province of East Flanders. The constituency currently elects 20 of the 150 members of the Chamber of Representatives using the open party-list proportional representation electoral system. At the 2024 federal election the constituency had 1,182,578 registered electors.

== Electoral system ==
East Flanders currently elects 20 of the 150 members of the Chamber of Representatives using the open party-list proportional representation electoral system. Seats are allocated using the D'Hondt method. Only parties that reach the 5% threshold in the constituency compete for seats.

Electors may vote for the list (party) or for individual candidates, either main candidates or substitute candidates or a combination, on the list. They may vote for as many candidates as there are seats in the constituency. Split-ticket voting (panachage) is not permitted and will result in the ballot paper being invalidated. The minimum number of votes a candidate must obtain to get elected - the quotient - is calculated as the total votes received by the party divided by the number of seats in the constituency plus one. Half the ballot papers where there are no votes for main candidates (i.e. the elector has voted for the list or for substitute candidates only) are redistributed amongst main candidates in the order they appear on the ballot paper so that the candidate's total votes (personal votes plus redistributed votes) equals the quotient. The seats won by the party are then allocated to the candidates with the most number of total votes.

== Election results ==
=== Summary ===
Election	Workers PVDA			Groen Groen / Agalev			Vooruit Vooruit / SP.A / SP.A-Spirit			Liberals & Democrats Open Vld / VLD			Christian Democrats CD&V			New Flemish N-VA / CD&V-N-VA			Vlaams Belang VB / VB		
Election	Votes	%	Seats	Votes	%	Seats	Votes	%	Seats	Votes	%	Seats	Votes	%	Seats	Votes	%	Seats	Votes	%	Seats
2024	75,942	7.31%	1	103,722	9.99%	2	127,758	12.30%	3	119,200	11.48%	2	125,871	12.12%	2	231,470	22.29%	5	234,888	22.61%	5
2019	55,209	5.53%	1	103,061	10.32%	2	101,447	10.16%	2	178,349	17.85%	4	127,024	12.72%	2	218,023	21.83%	5	200,173	20.04%	4
2014	26,381	2.67%	0	90,473	9.15%	2	131,903	13.34%	3	179,167	18.12%	4	177,349	17.94%	4	306,650	31.01%	6	61,620	6.23%	1
2010	11,950	1.25%	0	70,297	7.36%	1	135,212	14.15%	3	166,278	17.40%	4	147,151	15.40%	3	269,049	28.15%	6	117,817	12.33%	3
2007	9,644	0.99%	0	70,438	7.22%	1	154,536	15.83%	3	234,906	24.07%	5				260,584	26.70%	6	181,331	18.58%	4
2003	4,085	0.42%	0	43,737	4.52%	0	213,413	22.07%	5	296,999	30.71%	7	184,713	19.10%	4	41,255	4.27%	0	162,166	16.77%	4

(Figures in italics represent alliances.)

=== Detailed ===
==== 2024 ====
Results of the 2024 federal election held on 9 June 2024:

Party		Votes per arrondissement							Total votes	%	Seats
Party		Aalst	Dender- monde	Eeklo	Ghent	Ouden- aarde	Sint- Niklaas	Expat- riates	Total votes	%	Seats
Vlaams Belang	VB	58,348	37,689	15,679	59,658	18,911	43,079	1,524	234,888	22.61%	5
New Flemish Alliance	N-VA	44,088	34,094	11,527	79,472	17,339	43,516	1,434	231,470	22.29%	5
Vooruit	Vooruit	24,021	16,599	8,019	47,965	8,594	21,578	982	127,758	12.30%	3
Christian Democratic and Flemish	CD&V	21,286	17,659	8,786	46,591	11,491	19,385	673	125,871	12.12%	2
Open Flemish Liberals and Democrats	Open Vld	23,276	14,856	5,738	46,805	14,914	11,921	1,690	119,200	11.48%	2
Groen	Groen	13,007	8,993	3,751	55,531	7,360	12,970	2,110	103,722	9.99%	2
Workers' Party of Belgium	PVDA	12,273	8,355	4,336	30,586	5,461	14,346	585	75,942	7.31%	1
Blank Party	PB	1,488	977	485	2,960	780	1,240	127	8,057	0.78%	0
For You	VU	1,498	955	540	2,889	747	1,265	113	8,007	0.77%	0
Common Sense	GV	458	527	103	689	126	392	57	2,352	0.23%	0
Belgische Unie – Union Belge	BUB	310	165	56	446	161	203	49	1,390	0.13%	0
Valid votes		200,053	140,869	59,020	373,592	85,884	169,895	9,344	1,038,657	100.00%	20
Rejected votes		9,136	5,694	3,120	14,261	4,760	6,993	748	44,712	4.13%	
Total polled		209,189	146,563	62,140	387,853	90,644	176,888	10,092	1,083,369	91.61%	
Registered electors		228,361	158,169	67,543	420,139	97,715	191,940	18,711	1,182,578		
Turnout		91.60%	92.66%	92.00%	92.32%	92.76%	92.16%	53.94%	91.61%		

The following candidates were elected: Peter Buysrogge (N-VA), 8,315 votes; Alexander De Croo (Open Vld), 61,309 votes; Kathleen Depoorter (N-VA), 13,600 votes; Ortwin Depoortere (VB), 10,705 votes; Petra De Sutter (Groen), 64,716 votes; Christoph D'Haese (N-VA), 23,635 votes; Katja Gabriëls (Open Vld), 8,458 votes; Leentje Grillaert (CD&V), 10,285 votes; Brent Meuleman (Vooruit), 5,581 votes; Barbara Pas (VB), 57,051 votes; Lotte Peeters (N-VA), 9,666 votes; Werner Somers (VB), 10,900 votes; Robin Tonniau (PVDA), 10,625 votes; Francesca Van Belleghem (VB), 10,229 vote; Anneleen Van Bossuyt (N-VA), 31,925 votes; Joris Vandenbroucke (Vooruit), 17,506 votes; Stefaan Van Hecke (Groen), 7,228 votes; Alexander Van Hoecke (VB), 8,696 votes; Vincent Van Peteghem (CD&V), 52,807 votes; and Anja Vanrobaeys (Vooruit), 8,756 votes.

Substitutions:

- Anneleen Van Bossuyt (N-VA) was appointed to the federal government and was substituted by Lieve Truyman (N-VA) on 4 February 2025.
- Vincent Van Peteghem (CD&V) was appointed to the federal government and was substituted by Phaedra Van Keymolen (CD&V) on 4 February 2025.
- Joris Vandenbroucke (Vooruit) resigned on 14 March 2025 and was substituted by Niels Tas (Vooruit) on 20 March 2025.

==== 2019 ====
Results of the 2019 federal election held on 26 May 2019:

Party		Votes per arrondissement							Total votes	%	Seats
Party		Aalst	Dender- monde	Eeklo	Ghent	Ouden- aarde	Sint- Niklaas	Expat- riates	Total votes	%	Seats
New Flemish Alliance	N-VA	43,495	31,932	10,603	73,252	15,010	43,461	270	218,023	21.83%	5
Vlaams Belang	VB	51,297	31,286	12,023	53,336	14,688	37,446	97	200,173	20.04%	4
Open Flemish Liberals and Democrats	Open Vld	32,806	22,666	9,981	72,649	19,948	19,944	355	178,349	17.85%	4
Christian Democratic and Flemish	CD&V	20,793	19,375	8,656	45,724	12,244	20,123	109	127,024	12.72%	2
Groen	Groen	13,168	10,024	3,816	53,186	6,912	15,588	367	103,061	10.32%	2
Socialist Party Different	SP.A	21,285	12,327	6,440	38,006	9,102	14,190	97	101,447	10.16%	2
Workers' Party of Belgium	PVDA	7,106	5,524	4,006	25,808	3,393	9,299	73	55,209	5.53%	1
DierAnimal		2,119	1,646	628	4,564	876	1,944	24	11,801	1.18%	0
Belgische Unie – Union Belge		263	221	126	1,054	179	251	4	2,098	0.21%	0
Of Co-operation		704	200	77	475	85	188	3	1,732	0.17%	0
Valid votes		193,036	135,201	56,356	368,054	82,437	162,434	1,399	998,917	100.00%	20
Rejected votes		9,886	6,349	3,749	17,200	5,434	7,461	70	50,149	4.78%	
Total polled		202,922	141,550	60,105	385,254	87,871	169,895	1,469	1,049,066	90.77%	
Registered electors		223,256	155,284	65,914	426,081	95,831	187,450	1,918	1,155,734		
Turnout		90.89%	91.16%	91.19%	90.42%	91.69%	90.63%	76.59%	90.77%		

The following candidates were elected: Peter Buysrogge (N-VA), 11,724 votes; Steven Creyelman (VB), 10,617 votes; Mathias De Clercq (Open Vld), 17,856 votes; Pieter De Crem (CD&V), 36,118 votes; Alexander De Croo (Open Vld), 80,283 votes; Kathleen Depoorter (N-VA), 14,794 votes; Ortwin Depoortere (VB), 11,219 votes; Pieter De Spiegeleer (VB), 10,244 votes; Steven De Vuyst (PVDA), 9,203 votes; Christoph D'Haese (N-VA), 31,370 votes; Leen Dierick (CD&V), 18,553 votes; Katja Gabriëls (Open Vld), 12,990 votes; Egbert Lachaert (Open Vld), 14,637 votes; Barbara Pas (VB), 41,911 votes; Tomas Roggeman (N-VA), 9,616 votes; Anneleen Van Bossuyt (N-VA), 37,510 votes; Joris Vandenbroucke (SP.A), 19,493 votes; Stefaan Van Hecke (Groen), 14,593 votes; Anja Vanrobaeys (SP.A), 8,527 votes; and Evita Willaert (Groen), 11,784 votes.

Substitutions:

- Mathias De Clercq (Open Vld) resigned on 18 June 2019 and was substituted by Robby De Caluwé (Open Vld) on 20 June 2019.
- Pieter De Crem (CD&V) resigned on 20 June 2019 and was substituted by Jan Briers (CD&V) on the same day.
- Alexander De Croo (Open Vld) was appointed to the federal government and was substituted by Tania De Jonge (Open Vld) on 17 March 2020.
- Evita Willaert (Groen) resigned on 24 May 2022 and was substituted by Kathleen Pisman (Groen) on 25 May 2022.

==== 2014 ====
Results of the 2014 federal election held on 25 May 2014:

Party		Votes per arrondissement							Total votes	%	Seats
Party		Aalst	Dender- monde	Eeklo	Ghent	Ouden- aarde	Sint- Niklaas	Expat- riates	Total votes	%	Seats
New Flemish Alliance	N-VA	66,063	46,591	16,334	96,562	22,321	58,533	246	306,650	31.01%	6
Open Flemish Liberals and Democrats	Open Vld	36,465	24,937	9,928	68,013	20,067	19,463	294	179,167	18.12%	4
Christian Democratic and Flemish	CD&V	28,782	26,022	11,366	62,642	17,175	31,198	164	177,349	17.94%	4
Socialist Party Different	SP.A	26,111	15,397	7,067	53,315	10,917	18,978	118	131,903	13.34%	3
Groen	Groen	11,580	9,066	4,323	44,719	6,164	14,409	212	90,473	9.15%	2
Vlaams Belang	VB	15,184	9,087	3,433	17,734	3,508	12,613	61	61,620	6.23%	1
Workers' Party of Belgium	PVDA	3,232	2,376	2,901	12,147	1,380	4,319	26	26,381	2.67%	0
Pirate Party		1,257	958	450	3,526	476	1,446	11	8,124	0.82%	0
ROSSEM		459	349	189	944	189	424	3	2,557	0.26%	0
Social Democrats and Progressives	SD&P	1,650	171	40	288	47	99	3	2,298	0.23%	0
Belgische Unie – Union Belge	BUB	267	175	72	515	150	172	15	1,366	0.14%	0
Party for the Disabled and Welfare	PVGW	324	116	50	250	56	135	1	932	0.09%	0
Valid votes		191,374	135,245	56,153	360,655	82,450	161,789	1,154	988,820	100.00%	20
Rejected votes		10,096	6,848	3,608	16,561	5,238	7,381	51	49,783	4.79%	
Total polled		201,470	142,093	59,761	377,216	87,688	169,170	1,205	1,038,603	91.76%	
Registered electors		219,954	153,864	64,917	412,867	94,574	184,162	1,536	1,131,874		
Turnout		91.60%	92.35%	92.06%	91.37%	92.72%	91.86%	78.45%	91.76%		

The following candidates were elected: Siegfried Bracke (N-VA), 64,481 votes; Peter Buysrogge (N-VA), 11,877 votes; Pieter De Crem (CD&V), 47,036 votes; Alexander De Croo (Open Vld), 78,073 votes; Peter Dedecker (N-VA), 24,384 votes; Christoph D'Haese (N-VA), 22,677 votes; Leen Dierick (CD&V), 24,185 votes; Egbert Lachaert (Open Vld), 16,182 votes; Barbara Pas (VB), 12,422 votes; Fatma Pehlivan (SP.A), 14,336 votes; Sarah Smeyers (N-VA), 31,700 votes; Ine Somers (Open Vld), 10,553 votes; Karin Temmerman (SP.A), 30,291 votes; Goedele Uyttersprot (N-VA), 18,266 votes; Carina Van Cauter (Open Vld), 24,945 votes; Dirk Van der Maelen (SP.A), 18,814 votes; Stefaan Van Hecke (Groen), 12,999 votes; Stefaan Vercamer (CD&V), 20,907 votes; Evita Willaert (Groen), 9,628 votes; and Veli Yüksel (CD&V), 16,635 votes.

Substitutions:

- Pieter De Crem (CD&V) was appointed to the federal government and was substituted by Sarah Claerhout (CD&V) on 14 October 2014.
- Alexander De Croo (Open Vld) was appointed to the federal government and was substituted by Katja Gabriëls (Open Vld) on 14 October 2014.

==== 2010 ====
Results of the 2010 federal election held on 13 June 2010:

Party		Votes per arrondissement							Total votes	%	Seats
Party		Aalst	Dender- monde	Eeklo	Ghent	Ouden- aarde	Sint- Niklaas	Expat- riates	Total votes	%	Seats
New Flemish Alliance	N-VA	53,355	41,129	14,354	90,401	17,970	51,639	201	269,049	28.15%	6
Open Flemish Liberals and Democrats	Open Vld	33,183	21,739	8,648	64,012	20,257	18,256	183	166,278	17.40%	4
Christian Democratic and Flemish	CD&V	24,474	21,690	11,327	50,385	13,763	25,418	94	147,151	15.40%	3
Socialist Party Different	SP.A	29,062	15,939	6,499	51,592	11,978	20,046	96	135,212	14.15%	3
Vlaams Belang	VB	28,671	17,664	6,267	33,650	7,624	23,885	56	117,817	12.33%	3
Groen	Groen	8,778	7,000	3,386	35,870	4,744	10,380	139	70,297	7.36%	1
List Dedecker	LDD	5,546	3,809	2,325	11,842	2,294	4,632	15	30,463	3.19%	0
Workers' Party of Belgium	PVDA	1,535	1,013	1,804	5,247	671	1,668	12	11,950	1.25%	0
Respect		1,042	2,025	214	1,420	314	613	2	5,630	0.59%	0
Left Socialist Party	LSP	349	223	117	785	147	284	2	1,907	0.20%	0
Valid votes		185,995	132,231	54,941	345,204	79,762	156,821	800	955,754	100.00%	20
Rejected votes		11,167	6,774	3,877	18,047	5,606	7,831	35	53,337	5.29%	
Total polled		197,162	139,005	58,818	363,251	85,368	164,652	835	1,009,091	91.31%	
Registered electors		216,506	151,395	64,188	399,067	92,856	180,228	883	1,105,123		
Turnout		91.07%	91.82%	91.63%	91.03%	91.94%	91.36%	94.56%	91.31%		

The following candidates were elected: Siegfried Bracke (N-VA), 10,940 votes; Mathias De Clercq (Open Vld), 60,291 votes; Pieter De Crem (CD&V), 39,666 votes; Herman De Croo (Open Vld), 36,988 votes; Peter Dedecker (N-VA), 9,108 votes; Ingeborg De Meulemeester (N-VA), 11,199 votes; Guy D'haeseleer (VB), 25,441 votes; Leen Dierick (CD&V), 22,499 votes; Barbara Pas (VB), 9,794 votes; Sarah Smeyers (N-VA), 21,182 votes; Ine Somers (Open Vld), 10,152 votes; Karin Temmerman (SP.A), 16,946 votes; Bruno Tuybens (SP.A), 12,611 votes; Karel Uyttersprot (N-VA), 13,279 votes; Carina Van Cauter (Open Vld), 17,769 votes; Dirk Van der Maelen (SP.A), 34,331 votes; Miranda Van Eetvelde (N-VA), 8,848 votes; Stefaan Van Hecke (Groen), 10,283 votes; Stefaan Vercamer (CD&V), 18,671 votes; and Tanguy Veys (VB), 5,381 votes.

Substitutions:

- Pieter De Crem (CD&V) was appointed to the federal government and was substituted by Jenne De Potter (CD&V) on 7 December 2011.

==== 2007 ====
Results of the 2007 federal election held on 10 June 2007:

Party		Votes per arrondissement							Total votes	%	Seats
Party		Aalst	Dender- monde	Eeklo	Ghent	Ouden- aarde	Sint- Niklaas	Expat- riates	Total votes	%	Seats
Christian Democratic and Flemish and New Flemish Alliance	CD&V-N-VA	44,953	38,371	18,111	90,220	22,107	46,652	170	260,584	26.70%	6
Open Flemish Liberals and Democrats	Open Vld	47,379	32,753	12,084	90,022	24,158	28,248	262	234,906	24.07%	5
Vlaams Belang	VB	42,477	26,368	8,639	53,950	11,970	37,794	133	181,331	18.58%	4
Socialist Party Different and Spirit	SP.A-Spirit	32,747	18,862	7,712	57,590	13,333	24,180	112	154,536	15.83%	3
Groen	Groen	9,463	7,319	3,585	34,917	4,631	10,388	135	70,438	7.22%	1
List Dedecker	LDD	11,602	9,476	4,140	21,566	4,604	9,499	22	60,909	6.24%	1
Workers' Party of Belgium	PVDA	1,219	923	1,730	3,920	480	1,356	16	9,644	0.99%	0
Committee for Another Policy	CAP	609	415	180	1,643	251	648	3	3,749	0.38%	0
Valid votes		190,449	134,487	56,181	353,828	81,534	158,765	853	976,097	100.00%	20
Rejected votes		8,860	5,532	3,228	14,523	4,559	6,569	27	43,298	4.25%	
Total polled		199,309	140,019	59,409	368,351	86,093	165,334	880	1,019,395	93.12%	
Registered electors		213,517	149,717	63,546	397,963	91,453	177,467	1,077	1,094,740		
Turnout		93.35%	93.52%	93.49%	92.56%	94.14%	93.16%	81.71%	93.12%		

The following candidates were elected: Pieter De Crem (CD&V-N-VA), 94,705 votes; Herman De Croo (Open Vld), 48,930 votes; Karel De Gucht (Open Vld), 95,628 votes; Martine De Maght (LDD), 7,832 votes; Guido De Padt (Open Vld), 19,598 votes; Guy D'haeseleer (VB), 32,983 votes; Leen Dierick (CD&V-N-VA), 22,034 votes; Peter Leyman (CD&V-N-VA), 31,557 votes; Sarah Smeyers (CD&V-N-VA), 21,182 votes; Bruno Stevenheydens (VB), 12,440 votes; Bruno Tuybens (SP.A-Spirit), 14,500 votes; Ilse Uyttersprot (CD&V-N-VA), 19,864 votes; Carina Van Cauter (Open Vld), 18,294 votes; Freya Van den Bossche (SP.A-Spirit), 58,987 votes; Francis Van den Eynde (VB), 14,238 votes; Dirk Van der Maelen (SP.A-Spirit), 19,511 votes; Stefaan Van Hecke (Groen), 7,905 votes; Gerda Van Steenberge (VB), 13,895 votes; Stefaan Vercamer (CD&V-N-VA), 21,713 votes; and Geert Versnick (Open Vld), 15,959 votes.

Substitutions:

- Gerda Van Steenberge (VB) resigned on 11 June 2007 and was substituted by Barbara Pas (VB).
- Pieter De Crem (CD&V-N-VA) was appointed to the federal government and was substituted by Lieve Van Daele (CD&V-N-VA) between 21 December 2007 and 16 January 2008; and by Jenne De Potter (CD&V-N-VA) from 17 January 2008.
- Karel De Gucht (Open Vld) was appointed to the federal government and was substituted by Mathias De Clercq (Open Vld) between 21 December 2007 and 17 July 2009.
- Peter Leyman (CD&V-N-VA) resigned on 16 January 2008 and was substituted by Lieve Van Daele (CD&V-N-VA).
- Guido De Padt (Open Vld) was appointed to the federal government and was substituted by Ine Somers (Open Vld) between 30 December 2008 and 17 July 2009.
- Freya Van den Bossche (SP.A-Spirit) resigned on 30 June 2009 and was substituted by Cathy Plasman (SP.A-Spirit) on 2 July 2009.
- Karel De Gucht (Open Vld) resigned on 17 July 2009 and was substituted by Mathias De Clercq (Open Vld) on 16 September 2009.
- Guido De Padt (Open Vld) resigned on 17 July 2009 and was substituted by Ine Somers (Open Vld) on 16 September 2009.

==== 2003 ====
Results of the 2003 federal election held on 18 May 2003:

Party		Votes per arrondissement							Total votes	%	Seats
Party		Aalst	Dender- monde	Eeklo	Ghent	Ouden- aarde	Sint- Niklaas	Expat- riates	Total votes	%	Seats
Flemish Liberals and Democrats	VLD	60,874	40,492	16,725	112,810	28,383	37,425	290	296,999	30.71%	7
Socialist Party Different and Spirit	SP.A-Spirit	42,935	29,306	12,690	75,146	17,038	36,211	87	213,413	22.07%	5
Christian Democratic and Flemish	CD&V	33,002	27,082	13,447	63,967	17,327	29,718	170	184,713	19.10%	4
Vlaams Blok	VB	34,205	23,032	7,528	51,863	10,489	34,923	126	162,166	16.77%	4
Agalev	Agalev	5,519	4,235	2,131	22,890	2,585	6,287	90	43,737	4.52%	0
New Flemish Alliance	N-VA	8,614	6,382	1,600	15,074	2,361	7,190	34	41,255	4.27%	0
Vivant	Vivant	1,745	1,132	493	3,970	775	1,713	14	9,842	1.02%	0
Liberal Appeal	LA	623	1,059	193	1,405	422	2,331	10	6,043	0.62%	0
Workers' Party of Belgium	PVDA	444	382	794	1,631	156	674	4	4,085	0.42%	0
Left Socialist Party	LSP	669	336	159	1,050	329	377	9	2,929	0.30%	0
Belgische Unie – Union Belge	BUB	315	178	101	720	169	341	4	1,828	0.19%	0
Valid votes		188,945	133,616	55,861	350,526	80,034	157,190	838	967,010	100.00%	20
Rejected votes		9,630	5,191	3,107	13,918	4,616	5,893	80	42,435	4.20%	
Total polled		198,575	138,807	58,968	364,444	84,650	163,083	918	1,009,445	93.43%	
Registered electors		211,136	147,564	62,718	394,421	89,879	173,635	1,038	1,080,391		
Turnout		94.05%	94.07%	94.02%	92.40%	94.18%	93.92%	88.44%	93.43%		

The following candidates were elected: Filip Anthuenis (VLD), 17,599 votes; Pieter De Crem (CD&V), 34,941 votes; Herman De Croo (VLD), 72,936 votes; Karel De Gucht (VLD), 30,972 votes; Magda De Meyer (SP.A-Spirit), 10,570 votes; Guido De Padt (VLD), 16,261 votes; Guy D'haeseleer (VB), 10,606 votes; Greta D'Hondt (CD&V), 23,909 votes; Hilde Dierickx (VLD), 12,545 votes; Fientje Moerman (VLD), 27,492 votes; Daan Schalck (SP.A-Spirit), 11,050 votes; Paul Tant (CD&V), 32,822 votes; Freya Van den Bossche (SP.A-Spirit), 105,875 votes; Jaak Van den Broeck (VB), 6,363 votes; Francis Van den Eynde (VB), 31,370 votes; Dirk Van der Maelen (SP.A-Spirit), 17,722 votes; Paul Van Grembergen (SP.A-Spirit), 17,566 votes; Tony Van Parys (CD&V), 58,333 votes; Gerda Van Steenberge (VB), 10,127 votes; and Guy Verhofstadt (VLD), 166,771 votes.

Substitutions:

- Guy Verhofstadt (VLD) was elected to the Senate and was substituted by Geert Versnick (VLD) on 21 May 2003.
- Paul Van Grembergen (SP.A-Spirit) resigned on 28 May 2003 after he was appointed to the government of Flemish Minister-President Bart Somers and was substituted by Annelies Storms (SP.A-Spirit).
- Gerda Van Steenberge (VB) resigned on 5 July 2004 and was substituted by Ortwin Depoortere (VB) on 8 July 2004.
- Freya Van den Bossche (SP.A-Spirit) was appointed to the federal government and was substituted by Cemal Çavdarlı (SP.A-Spirit) between 14 July 2003 and 14 September 2004; and by Dylan Casaer (SP.A-Spirit) from 15 September 2004.
- Fientje Moerman (VLD) was appointed to the federal government and was substituted by Guy Hove (VLD) between 14 July 2003 and 18 July 2004.
- Karel De Gucht (VLD) was appointed to the federal government and was substituted by Guy Hove (VLD) on 21 July 2004.
- Fientje Moerman (VLD) resigned on 30 July 2004 after he was appointed to the government of Flemish Minister-President Yves Leterme and was substituted by Ingrid Meeus (VLD).
- Daan Schalck (SP.A-Spirit) resigned on 10 September 2004 and was substituted by Cemal Çavdarlı (SP.A-Spirit) on 15 September 2004.
