= List of members of the Chamber of Representatives of Belgium, 2019–2024 =

Legislative term

This is a list of members of the Belgian Chamber of Representatives during the 55th legislature (2019–2024). These Members of Parliament were elected in the 2019 Belgian federal election.

== List ==
=== New Flemish Alliance ===
- Björn Anseeuw
- Theo Francken
- Darya Safai
- Peter De Roover
- Sophie De Wit
- Yngvild Ingels
- Michael Freilich
- Zuhal Demir
- Kathleen Depoorter
- Peter Buysrogge
- Frieda Gijbels
- Sander Loones
- Anneleen Van Bossuyt
- Kristien Van Vaerenbergh
- Bert Wollants

=== Ecolo ===
- Kristof Calvo
- Wouter De Vriendt
- Marie-Colline Leroy

=== Socialist Party ===
- Ahmed Laaouej
- Özlem Zengin
- Eliane Tillieux

=== Vlaams Belang ===
- Barbara Pas
- Tom Van Grieken
- Dries Van Langenhove

=== Reformist Movement ===
- Daniel Bacquelaine
- Marie-Christine Marghem
- Florence Reuter

=== Workers' Party ===
1. Nabil Boukili
2. Gaby Colebunders
3. Greet Daems
4. Roberto d'Amico
5. Steven De Vuyst
6. Raoul Hedebouw
7. Sofie Merckx
8. Peter Mertens
9. Nadia Moscufo
10. Marco Van Hees
11. Maria Vindevoghel
12. Thierry Warmoes

=== Christen-Democratisch en Vlaams ===
- Nahima Lanjri

=== Open Flemish Liberals and Democrats ===
- Maggie De Block
- Robby De Caluwé
- Patrick Dewael
- Christian Leysen
- Goedele Liekens

=== Vooruit ===
1. Melissa Depraetere
2. Karin Jiroflée
3. Bert Moyaers
4. Vicky Reynaert
5. Ben Segers
6. Joris Vandenbroucke
7. Gitta Vanpeborgh
8. Anja Vanrobaeys
9. Kris Verduyckt

=== Humanist Democratic Centre ===
1. Josy Arens
2. Georges Dallemagne
3. Catherine Fonck
4. Vanessa Matz
5. Maxime Prévot

=== DéFI ===
1. François De Smet
2. Sophie Rohonyi
