= East Flanders (Flemish Parliament constituency) =

- Flemish Parliament constituency
- East Flanders within Belgium

Current constituency
- Created: 2004
- Seats: 27

East Flanders is a parliamentary constituency in Belgium used to elect members of the Flemish Parliament since 2004. It corresponds to the province of East Flanders.

Article 26 of the Special Law on Institutional Reform of 1980 gives the Flemish Parliament itself the authority to define its electoral districts by decree. The arrondissemental constituencies were replaced by provincial ones by Special Decree of 30 January 2004. This and related provisions were coordinated into the Special Decree of 7 July 2006.

== Representatives ==
Name	Party	From	To
Andries Gryffroy	N-VA	2009	2014
Anne Marie Hoebeke	Open Vld	2004	2009
Bart Van Malderen	SP.A	2004	2014
Björn Rzoska	Groen	2009	2014
Boudewijn Bouckaert	LDD	2009	2014
Cindy Franssen	CD&V	2004	2014
Dany Vandenbossche	SP.A	2004	2009
Dirk De Cock	SLP	2004	2009
Egbert Lachaert	Open Vld	2009	2014
Elisabeth Meuleman	Groen	2009	2014
Elke Sleurs	N-VA	2009	2014
Erik Matthijs	CD&V	2004	2009
Erik Tack	VB	2004	2014
Fatma Pehlivan	SP.A	2009	2014
Fientje Moerman	Open Vld	2004	2014
Frans Wymeersch	VB	2004	2009
Freya Saeys	Open Vld	2009	2014
Freya Van den Bossche	SP.A	2009	2014
Gerda Van Steenberge	VB	2004	2014
Guy D'Haeseleer	VB	2009	2014
Helga Stevens	N-VA	2004	2014
Herman De Croo	Open Vld	2009	2014
Hilde Eeckhout	Open Vld	2004	2009
Ingeborg De Meulemeester	N-VA	2009	2014
Jan Roegiers	SP.A	2004	2014
Jean-Jacques De Gucht	Open Vld	2009	2014
Jenne De Potter	CD&V	2009	2014
Johan Deckmyn	VB	2004	2014
Joke Schauvliege	CD&V	2004	2009
Joris Vandenbroucke	SP.A	2009	2014
Jos De Meyer	CD&V	2004	2014
Jos Stassen	Groen	2004	2009
Karim Van Overmeire	N-VA	2004	2014
Koen Daniëls	N-VA	2009	2014
Kurt De Loor	SP.A	2004	2014
Marc Van De Vijver	CD&V	2009	2014
Marius Meremans	N-VA	2009	2014
Marnic De Meulemeester	Open Vld	2004	2014
Mathias De Clercq	Open Vld	2009	2014
Matthias Diependaele	N-VA	2009	2014
Miet Smet	CD&V	2004	2009
Miranda Van Eetvelde	N-VA	2009	2014
Monica Van Kerrebroeck	CD&V	2004	2009
Ortwin Depoortere	VB	2009	2014
Patricia De Waele	LDD	2009	2014
Patrick Lachaert	Open Vld	2004	2009
Paul Wille	Open Vld	2004	2009
Robrecht Bothuyne	CD&V	2009	2014
Sabine Vermeulen	N-VA	2009	2014
Sas van Rouveroij	Open Vld	2009	2014
Valerie Taeldeman	CD&V	2009	2014
Veli Yüksel	CD&V	2009	2014
Vera Dua	Groen	2004	2009
Vera Van der Borght	Open Vld	2004	2014
Werner Marginet	VB	2004	2009
