= Niels Tas =

Belgian politician (born 1983)

Member of the Chamber of Representatives
- Incumbent
- Assumed office 20 March 2025
- Preceded by: Joris Vandenbroucke
- Constituency: East Flanders

Personal details
- Born: 12 September 1983 (age 42) Dendermonde, Belgium
- Party: Vooruit

Niels E. M. Tas (born 12 September 1983) is a Belgian politician and member of the Chamber of Representatives. A member of Vooruit, he has represented East Flanders since March 2025.

Tas was born on 12 September 1983 in Dendermonde. He is a policy officer at The Learning Collective (Het leercollectief).

Tas has been a member of the municipal council in Dendermonde since 2007. He was leader of the Socialist Party Different (SP.A) group on the municipal council from 2009 to 2012 and from 2018 to 2024. He was a schepen (alderman) from 2013 to 2018 and from 2024. He contested the 2019 federal election as the SP.A's 3rd placed candidate in East Flanders but the party only won two seats in the constituency. He contested the 2024 federal election as Vooruit's first placed substitute candidate in East Flanders and received 3,639 preference votes. He was appointed to the Chamber of Representatives in March 2025 following the resignation of Joris Vandenbroucke.

Tas is married and has two children.

Electoral history of Niels Tas
Election	Constituency	Party	Votes	Result
2006 local	Dendermonde	Socialist Party Different-Spirit	500	Not elected
2012 local	Dendermonde	Socialist Party Different	609	Elected
2018 local	Dendermonde	Socialist Party Different	1,884	Elected
2019 federal	East Flanders	Socialist Party Different	5,634	Not elected
2024 local	Dendermonde	Vooruit	1,976	Elected
