= Maaike De Rudder =

Belgian politician (born 1993)

Maaike de Rudder
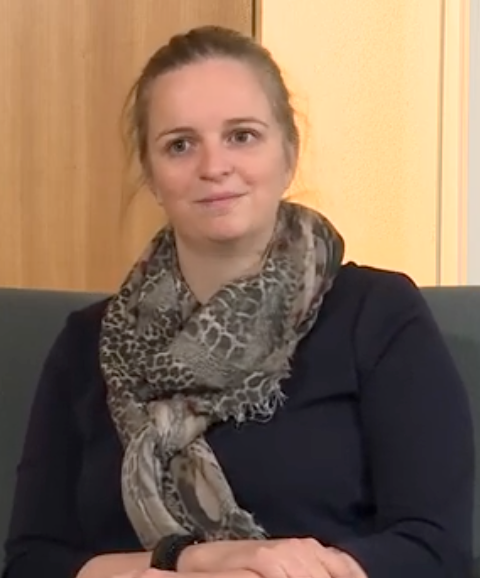

Member of the Flemish Parliament
- In office 18 June 2019 – 8 June 2024
- Constituency: East Flanders

Mayor of Sint-Gillis-Waas
- In office 2018 – 13 October 2024

Personal details
- Born: 31 May 1993 (age 33) Sint-Niklaas, Belgium
- Party: Christian Democratic and Flemish

Maaike de Rudder (born 31 May 1993) is a Belgian politician who served as a member of the Flemish Parliament from 2019 to 2024. She represented the constituency of East Flanders as a member of the Christian Democratic and Flemish (CD&V). She also served as the Mayor of Sint-Gillis-Waas from 2018 to 2024.

== Early life and career ==
De Rudder was born in Sint-Niklaas, Belgium.

== Political career ==
In 2018, De Rudder was elected mayor of Sint-Gillis-Waas, making her one of the youngest mayors in Belgium.

De Rudder was elected to the Flemish Parliament in the 2019 regional elections, representing East Flanders. During her tenure she served on several committees, including the Committee on Welfare, Public Health, Family and Poverty Reduction and the Committee on Culture, Youth, Sport and Media.

In 2024, De Rudder announced that she would not seek reelection to parliament, opting instead to focus on municipal politics. In the 13 October 2024 Sint-Gillis-Waas municipal election, she received 2,590 preference votes, the second highest of any candidate. Koen Daniëls, a candidate for the New Flemish Alliance, received 3,530 votes and subsequently became mayor.
