= Steven De Vuyst =

Belgian politician (born 1987)

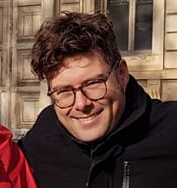
- De Vuyst in October 2019

Member of the Chamber of Representatives
- In office 20 June 2019 – 27 May 2024
- Constituency: East Flanders

Personal details
- Born: 13 April 1987 (age 38) Ghent, Belgium
- Party: Workers' Party of Belgium

Steven De Vuyst (born 13 April 1987) is a Belgian politician and former member of the Chamber of Representatives. A member of the Workers' Party of Belgium, he represented East Flanders from June 2019 to May 2024.

De Vuyst was born on 13 April 1987 in Ghent. He was a history teacher in Sint-Niklaas and also worked for Medics for the People (GVHV). He is a member of the General Union of Public Services (ACOD) trade union.

De Vuyst joined Comac, the Workers' Party of Belgium (PVDA)'s student wing, in 2005 and the PVDA in 2008. He contested the 2012 local election as the PVDA's seventh placed candidate in Zelzate but was not elected. However, he was appointed to the municipal council in January 2013 following the resignation of his father Philiep De Vuyst. He was re-elected at the 2018 local election. After the election PVDA formed an administration with the Socialist Party Different and De Vuyst was appointed Schepen (alderman) for youth, housing and climate change. He will be contesting the 2024 local election as the PVDA's mayoral candidate in Zelzate.

De Vuyst was parliamentary assistant to PVDA MPs Raoul Hedebouw and Marco Van Hees. He contested the 2014 federal election as the PVDA's first placed substitute candidate in East Flanders and received 1,136 preference votes. He was elected to the Chamber of Representatives at the 2019 federal election. He contested the 2024 federal election as the PVDA's first placed substitute candidate in East Flanders and received 3,365 preference votes.

Electoral history of Steven De Vuyst
Election	Constituency	Party	Votes	Result
2012 local	Zelzate	Workers' Party of Belgium	271	Not elected
2018 local	Zelzate	Workers' Party of Belgium	428	Elected
2019 federal	East Flanders	Workers' Party of Belgium	9,203	Elected
