= Anja Vanrobaeys =

Belgian politician (born 1968)

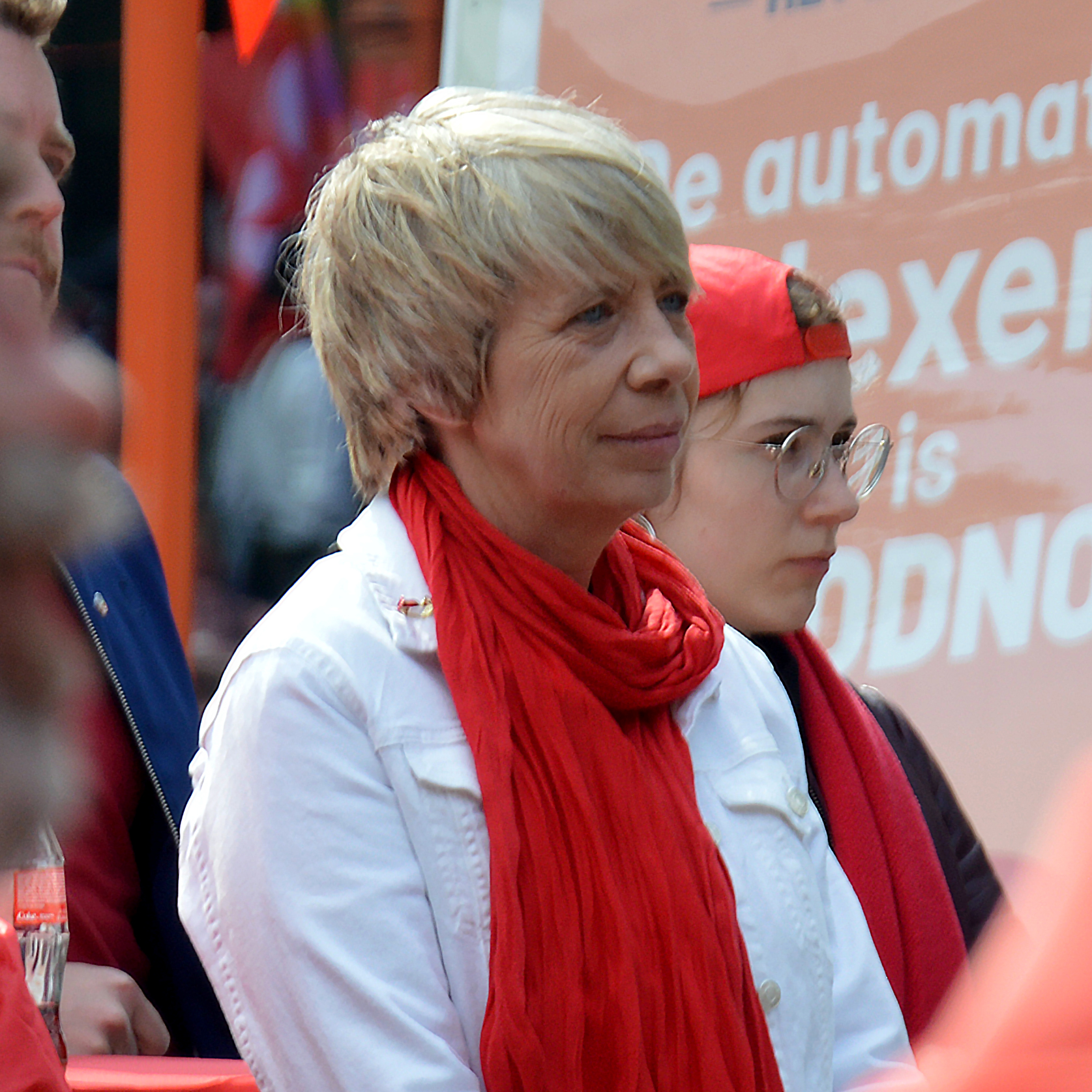
- Vanrobaeys in May 2022

Member of the Chamber of Representatives
- Incumbent
- Assumed office 20 June 2019
- Constituency: East Flanders

Personal details
- Born: 19 November 1968 (age 57) Lüdenscheid, Germany
- Party: Vooruit

Anja M. M. G. Vanrobaeys (born 19 November 1968) is a Belgian politician and member of the Chamber of Representatives. A member of Vooruit, she has represented East Flanders since June 2019.

Vanrobaeys was born on 19 November 1968 in Lüdenscheid, Germany. She has lived in Erpe since she was eight years old.

Vanrobaeys was elected to the municipal council in Erpe-Mere at the 2006 local election. She was re-elected at the 2012 and 2018 local elections. In March 2021 she announced that she was resigning from the municipal council in Erpe-Mere and moving to Aalst so that se can take part in politics there. She contested the 2009 regional election as the Socialist Party Different (SP.A)'s 22nd placed candidate in East Flanders but was not elected.

Vanrobaeys contested the 2010 federal election as the SP.A's 15th placed candidate in East Flanders but the party won only three seats in the constituency. She contested the 2014 federal election as the SP.A's second placed substitute candidate in East Flanders and received 3,478 preference votes. She was elected to the Chamber of Representatives at the 2019 federal election. She was re-elected at the 2024 federal election.

Electoral history of Anja Vanrobaeys
Election	Constituency	Party	Votes	Result
2006 local	Erpe-Mere	Socialist Party Different-Spirit-Groen	363	Elected
2009 regional	East Flanders	Socialist Party Different	3,149	Not elected
2010 federal	East Flanders	Socialist Party Different	3,560	Not elected
2012 local	Erpe-Mere	Socialist Party Different-Groen	403	Elected
2018 local	Erpe-Mere	Socialist Party Different-Groen	458	Elected
2019 federal	East Flanders	Socialist Party Different	8,527	Elected
2024 federal	East Flanders	Vooruit	8,756	Elected
