= Depoorter =

Depoorter is a surname. Notable people with the surname include:

- Bieke Depoorter (born 1986), Belgian photographer
- Kathleen Depoorter (born 1971), Belgian politician
- Richard Depoorter (1915–1948), Belgian racing cyclist
