= Roggeman =

Roggeman is a surname. Notable people with the surname include:

- Inge Roggeman (born 1981), Belgian cyclist
- Tomas Roggeman (born 1986), Belgian politician
- Tom Roggeman (1931–2018), American football player
- Willem Roggeman (born 1935), Belgian poet, novelist, and art critic
- Willy Roggeman (born 1934), Belgian writer and jazz musician
