= Brent Meuleman =

Belgian politician (born 1988)

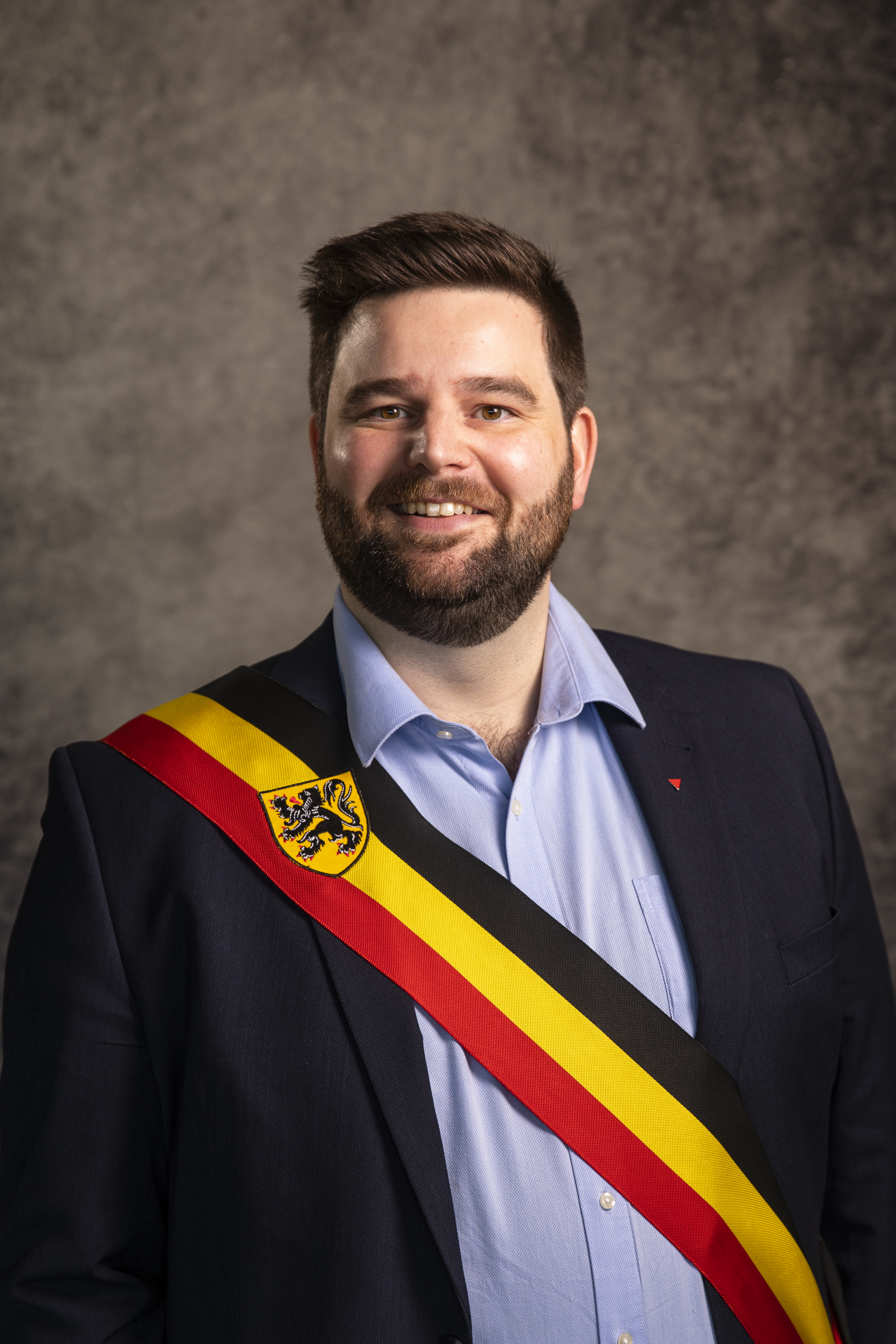
- Meuleman in February 2020

Member of the Chamber of Representatives
- Incumbent
- Assumed office 9 June 2024
- Constituency: East Flanders

Personal details
- Born: 17 March 1988 (age 38) Ghent, Belgium
- Party: Vooruit
- Education: Hogeschool Gent

Brent C. M. Meuleman (born 17 March 1988) is a Belgian politician and member of the Chamber of Representatives. A member of Vooruit, he has represented East Flanders since June 2024.

Meuleman was born on 17 March 1988 in Ghent. He is the son of Dirk Meuleman, a labourer at Sidmar, and Vera Herry, a childcare worker at a OCMW crèche. He was educated in Zelzate and obtained a teaching diploma at the Ledeganck campus of the Hogeschool Gent. Meuleman worked as a communications officer for the municipal council in Zelzate between 2009 and 2010. He was a worker at the BP oil refinery at the Port of Ghent. He then taught ethics at the Royal Atheneum in Zelzate.

Meuleman was elected to the municipal council in Zelzate at the 2012 local election. He was re-elected at the 2018 local election. After the election the Socialist Party Different (SP.A) formed an administration with the Workers' Party of Belgium, the first time the far-left party had joined a municipal government in Flanders, and Meuleman became mayor of Zelzate. Incumbent mayor Frank Bruggeman of the Flemish Liberals and Democrats had complained of irregularities in the vote count but this was dismissed by the Council for Electoral Disputes and the Council of State. Meuleman was sworn in as mayor on 16 January 2019.

Meuleman contested the 2014 federal election as the SP.A's third placed substitute candidate in East Flanders and received 2,675 preference votes. He contested the 2019 federal election as the SP.A's 18th placed candidate in East Flanders but was not elected. He was elected chairman of the East Flanders branch of Vooruit in June 2023. He was elected to the Chamber of Representatives at the 2024 federal election.

Electoral history of Brent Meuleman
Election	Constituency	Party	Votes	Result
2012 local	Zelzate	Socialist Party Different	302	Elected
2018 local	Zelzate	Socialist Party Different	1,334	Elected
2019 federal	East Flanders	Socialist Party Different	3,757	Not elected
2024 federal	East Flanders	Vooruit	5,581	Elected
