= Cemal Çavdarlı =

Turkish-Belgian politician

Cemal Çavdarlı (15 March 1966 - April 2024) is a binational Turkish-Belgian politician, formerly active in the Socialist Party – Differently (SP.A), since May 2010 in the Lijst Dedecker (LDD), a conservative liberal party and since April 2011 in the Islamic conservative Justice and Development Party (AKP) in Turkey.

== 1963-2003 - Life before political career ==
Born in Emirdağ (Turkey), he moved to Belgium with his mother in 1975, his father had earlier migrated to France in 1969, then to Belgium in 1972. He went back to Turkey to study at the Eskişehir İmam Hatip school (vocational high school for would-be imams) and came back in Belgium as an imam and religion teacher paid by the official Turkish Diyanet. He also studied at Ghent University. He was elected at the Belgian Muslim General Assembly on 13 December 1998, and became a member of the Muslim Executive of Belgium a few months later.

== 2003-2007 - Belgian Socialist member of Parliament ==
On 12 July 2003 he was sworn in at the Belgian Chamber of Representatives as a substitute to the elected SP.A MP Freya Van Den Bossche, who became a minister. He was candidate at the next federal elections in 2007 on the Senate list and was not elected.

During his term as a Belgian MP, he went back to Turkey in April 2005 for a few weeks to make his shortened (for emigrants) military service. When this was made public, there was a small controversy about the loyalty of dual citizens towards the Belgian State.

== 2010 - Unsuccessful Conservative candidate for the Belgian Parliament ==
When he was informed that he would - as in 2007 - not be put on an eligible place on the SP.A list for the 2010 federal elections he affiliated himself to the LDD and was put on the third place of that list for the West Flanders electoral circle. The LDD suffered a heavy defeat at these elections, only its president was elected in East Flanders, it won no seat elsewhere.

== 2011 - Islamic conservative candidate for the Turkish Parliament ==
In April 2011, he was officially announced as the fourth candidate on the list of the Islamic conservative Justice and Development Party (AKP) for the upcoming (12 June 2011) parliamentary elections in Turkey in the Eskişehir Province. At the previous elections in 2007, the AKP list won three of the six seats in this province. The party did not win more seats in 2011 and Cemal Çavdarlı was not elected. Out of five candidates from the Turkish emigration, only the Swiss Fazilet Dağcı Çığlık, who had already been elected in Erzurum in 2007 for the AKP, was elected, but neither the Belgian Cemal Çavdarlı nor the Germans (all from Köln) Turgut Öker (leader of the German Alevi together with Association and independent candidate in Istanbul for the Kurdish Peace and Democracy Party), Metin Keskin (an architect and CHP candidate in the province of Sivas) and Aydın Yardımcı (CEO of Aydin, a meat company in Köln, former member of the right-wing ANAP Party, Democratic Party candidate in Ankara).
