= Dendermonde-Sint-Niklaas (Chamber of Representatives constituency) =

Belgian political subdivision

Dendermonde-Sint-Niklaas was a constituency used to elect members of the Belgian Chamber of Representatives between 1995 and 2003.

== Representatives ==
Election	Representative (Party)	Representative (Party)	Representative (Party)	Representative (Party)	Representative (Party)	Representative (Party)
1995	Formed from a merger of Dendermonde and Sint-Niklaas					
1995	Filip Anthuenis (VLD)	Greta D'hondt (CVP)	Hunfred Schoeters (PS)	Jaak Van den Broeck (VB)	Jan Lenssens (CVP)	Marc Verwilghen (VLD)
1999	Filip Anthuenis (VLD)	Greta D'hondt (CVP)	Magda De Meyer (PS)	Jaak Van den Broeck (VB)	Ferdy Willems (VU)	Simonne Leen (Agalev)
