= Robby De Caluwé =

Belgian politician

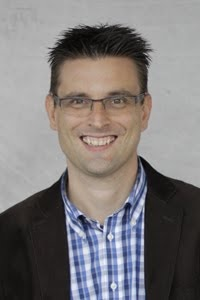
- Robby De Caluwé (picture: Barbara Baert)
- Born: 1 January 1975 (age 51); Lokeren
- Occupation: politician

Mayor of Moerbeke
- Incumbent
- Assumed office 2013
- Preceded by: Filip Marin

Personal details
- Party: Anders
- Website: http://www.robbydecaluwe.be

Robby De Caluwé (born 1 January 1975) is a Belgian politician for Anders (formerly Open Flemish Liberals and Democrats). He is mayor of Moerbeke-Waas since 2013 and member of the Belgian Federal Parliament since 2019.

== Biography ==
De Caluwé studied management between 1994 and 1997. He worked as a Branch Manager at SD Worx until 2011. In 2011 he started his own Human Resources company.

== Political career ==
In 1994, De Caluwé started his political career in Young VLD Moerbeke. Very soon, he became secretary, and later chairman. During a short period, he was also a member of the national party council from Open Vld. In 2010 he became chairman of Open Vld Moerbeke.

He started in local politics in Moerbeke and became member of the council after the elections in 2000. After his predecessor Filip Marin left the party, he was asked to pull the list for the elections in 2012. He obtained 860 preference votes and was by far the most popular politician in his city. In 2018, he became more popular and obtained 1,129 votes. This result made him the second most popular mayor in Waasland, after Michel Du Tré from Waasmunster.

During the federal elections of 2019, he was first successor. Since Mathias De Clercq did not take up his mandate, he became a Member of Parliament for the constituency of East Flanders. De Caluwé is a member of the committees "Health and Equal Chances" and "Naturalizations".

On 2 July 2020 he has been nominated president of the special committee charged with investigating Belgium's approach to the COVID-19 epidemic
