= Joris Vandenbroucke =

Belgian politician (born 1976)

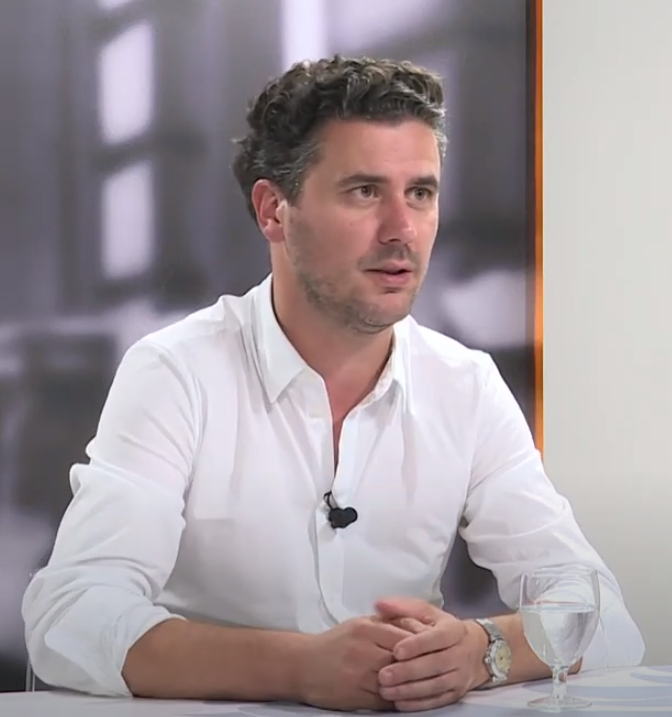
- Vandenbroucke in June 2018

Member of the Chamber of Representatives
- Incumbent
- Assumed office 20 June 2019
- Constituency: East Flanders

Member of the Flemish Parliament
- In office 17 June 2014 – 25 May 2019
- Preceded by: Daniël Termont
- Constituency: East Flanders
- In office 1 June 2005 – 6 June 2009
- Preceded by: Steve Stevaert
- Constituency: Limburg

Personal details
- Born: 7 December 1976 (age 49) Borgloon, Belgium
- Party: Vooruit
- Education: KU Leuven

Joris J. J. Vandenbroucke (born 7 December 1976) is a Belgian politician and member of the Chamber of Representatives. A member of Vooruit, he has represented East Flanders since June 2019. He was a member of the Flemish Parliament from June 2005 to June 2009 and from June 2014 to May 2019.

== Early life ==
Vandenbroucke was born on 7 December 1976 in Borgloon. He attended Montfortcollege Rotselaar boarding school where he was friend of Theo Francken. They were both members of the Katholieke Studentenactie (KSA). Vandenbroucke studied history and business economics at KU Leuven.

== People's Union ==
Vandenbroucke joined the People's Union (VU) whilst a student and was chairman of the Volksuniejongeren (VUJO), VU's youth wing, at KU Leuven. He was deputy spokesperson Flemish minister Johan Sauwens (VU) from 1999 to 2001. He was elected to the municipal council in Leuven at the 2000 local election.

== Spirit/Flemish Progressives ==
The VU split along ideological lines in 2001 and Vandenbroucke joined the centrist Toekomstgroep (Future Group), which would later become Spirit. He was spokesperson for Flemish minister of Gilbert Bossuyt (SP.A) from 2003 to 2004.

Vandenbroucke contested the 2004 regional election as the Socialist Party Different-Spirit electoral alliance's second placed substitute candidate in Limburg and received 4,967 preference votes. He was appointed to the Flemish Parliament in June 2005 following the resignation of Steve Stevaert.

Vandenbroucke moved from Borgloon to Beringen in 2005 in order to pursue politics there. He contested the 2006 local election as the SP.A-Spirit electoral alliance's 25th placed candidate in Beringen but was not elected. He contested the 2006 provincial election as the SP.A-Spirit electoral alliance's 10th placed candidate in Beringen but was not elected. He was appointed to the Public Centre for Social Welfare (OCMW) in Beringen in 2007 and the municipal council in Beringen in 2008.

Vandenbroucke left the Flemish Progressives (Vl.Pro) in December 2008 over its decision to end the electoral alliance with SP.A.

== Socialist Party Different/Vooruit ==
Vandenbroucke joined the SP.A in January 2009. He contested the 2009 regional election as the SP.A's fourth placed substitute candidate in Limburg and received 4,187 preference votes. He was chief of staff for Flemish minister Freya Van den Bossche (SP.A) from 2010 to 2014. In 2010 he moved to Ghent where his wife worked.

Vandenbroucke was elected to the provincial council in East Flanders at the 2012 provincial elections. He contested the 2014 regional election as the SP.A's first placed substitute candidate in East Flanders and received 4,125 preference votes. He was appointed to the Flemish Parliament in June 2014 following the resignation of Daniël Termont. He became leader of the SP.A group in Parliament in June 2015 after John Crombez became leader of SP.A.

Vandenbroucke contested the 2018 local election as the SP.A-Groen electoral alliance's ninth placed candidate in Ghent but was not elected. He contested the 2018 provincial election as SP.A's 10th placed candidate in Aalst-Oudenaarde but was not elected. He was appointed to the municipal council in Ghent in January 2019 after incumbent mayor Daniël Termont declined to take up his seat.

Vandenbroucke was elected to the Chamber of Representatives at the 2019 federal election. He became leader of the Vooruit group in the Chamber in November 2023 after Melissa Depraetere became interim chair of the party. He was re-elected at the 2024 federal election.

== Personal life ==
Vandenbroucke has two children and lives in Dampoort.

== Electoral history ==
Electoral history of Joris Vandenbroucke
Election	Constituency	Party	Votes	Result
2000 local	Leuven	People's Union-iD21		Elected
2006 local	Beringen	Socialist Party Different-Spirit	531	Not elected
2006 provincial	Limburg - Beringen	Socialist Party Different-Spirit	2,071	Not elected
2012 provincial	East Flanders - Ghent	Socialist Party Different	3,239	Elected
2018 local	Ghent	Socialist Party Different-Groen	2,473	Not elected
2018 provincial	East Flanders - Aalst-Oudenaarde	Socialist Party Different	2,520	Elected
2019 federal	East Flanders	Socialist Party Different	19,493	Elected
2024 federal	East Flanders	Vooruit	17,506	Elected
