= Barbara Bonte =

Belgian politician (born 1983)

Barbara Bonte MEP
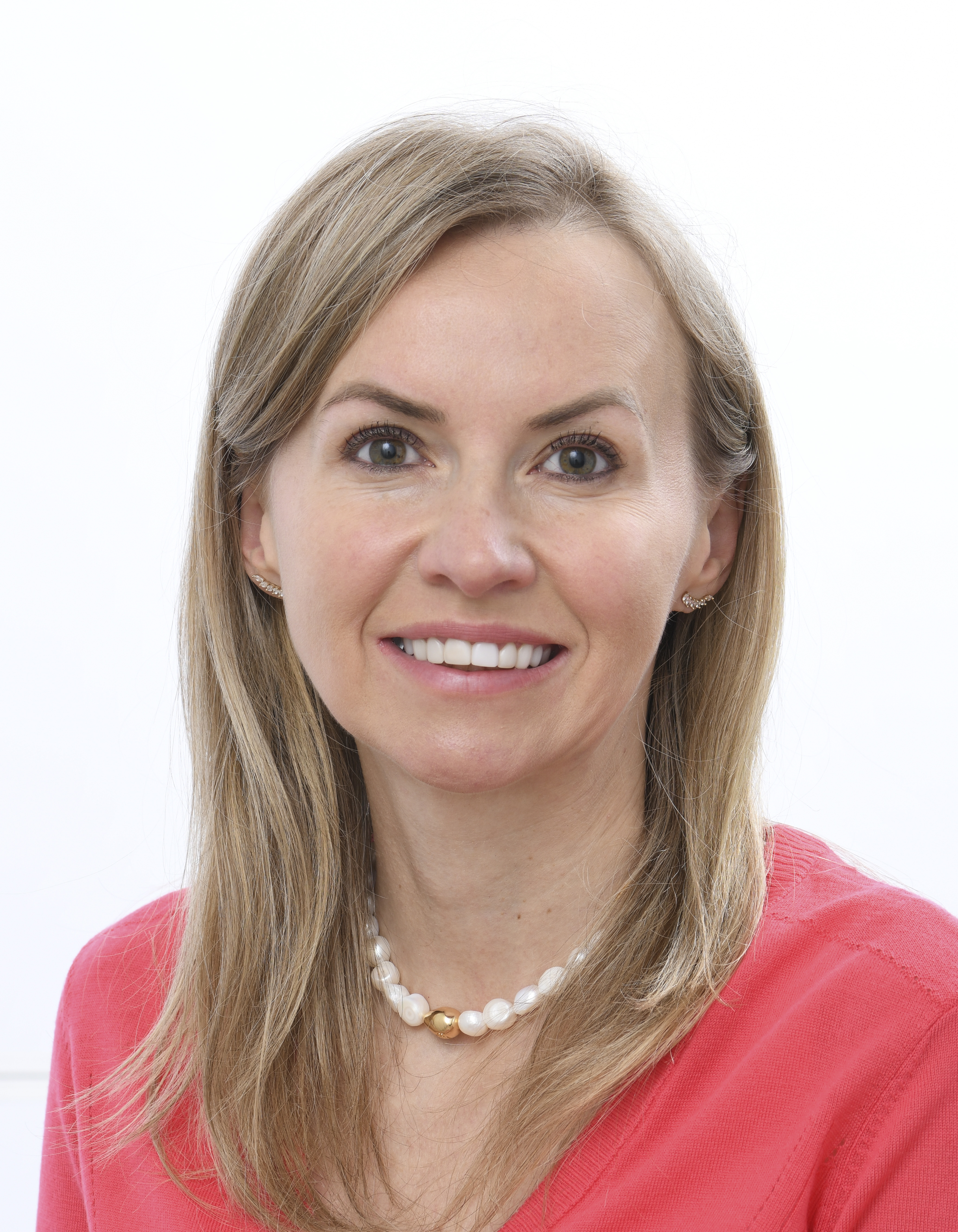
- Bonte in 2024

Member of the European Parliament for Belgium
- Incumbent
- Assumed office 16 July 2024

Member of the Flemish Parliament
- In office 17 June 2014 – 27 September 2015
- Succeeded by: Ortwin Depoortere

Personal details
- Born: 13 May 1983 (age 42)
- Party: Vlaams Belang
- Other political affiliations: Identity and Democracy Party

Barbara Bonte (born 13 May 1983) is a Belgian politician of Vlaams Belang who was elected member of the European Parliament in 2024. She was a member of the Flemish Parliament from 2014 to 2015.
