= Katja Gabriëls =

Belgian politician (born 1975)

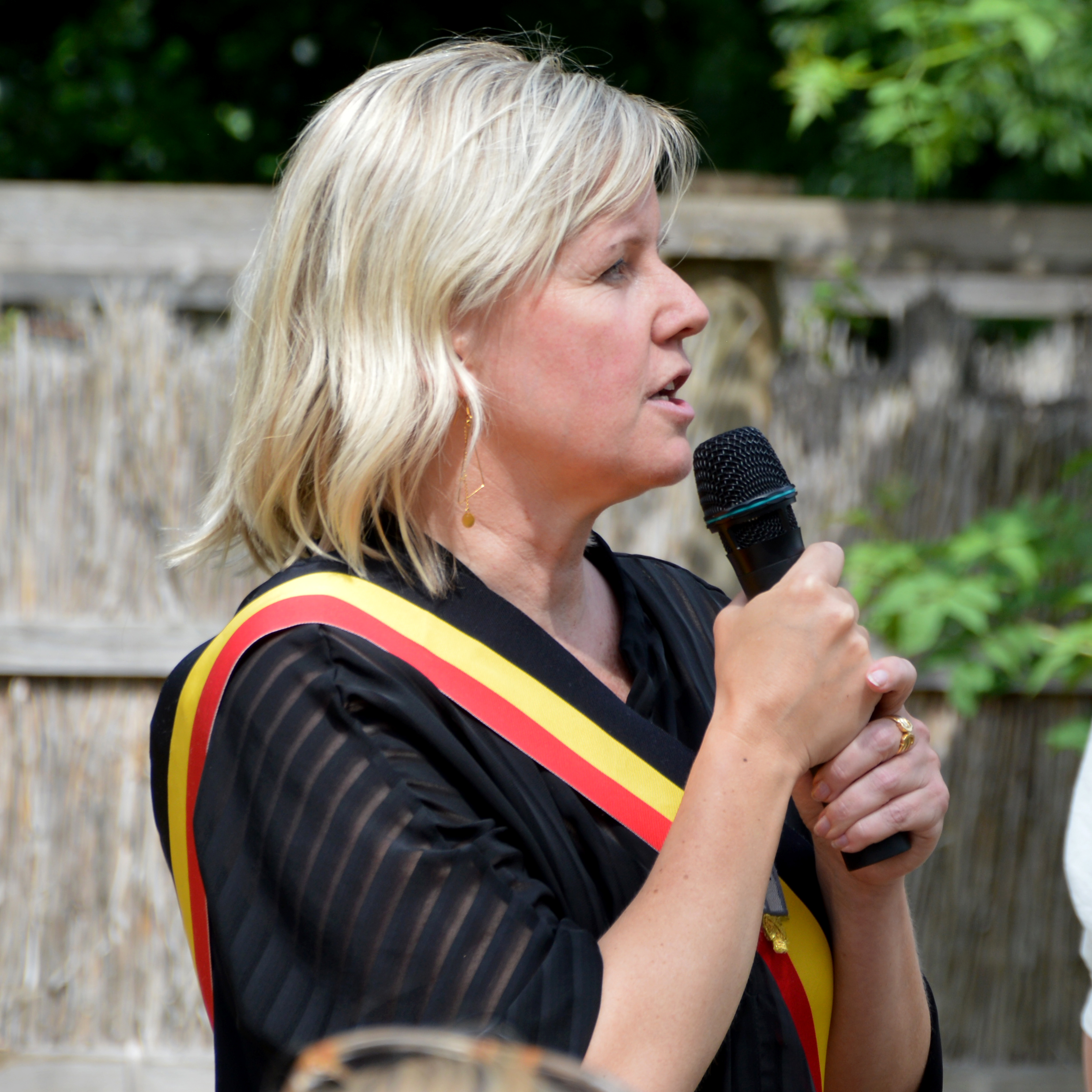
- Gabriëls in 2021

Member of the Chamber of Representatives
- Incumbent
- Assumed office 11 October 2014
- Preceded by: Alexander De Croo
- Constituency: East Flanders

Personal details
- Born: 13 February 1975 (age 51)
- Party: Anders

Katja Gabriëls (born 13 February 1975) is a Belgian politician of Anders (formerly Open Flemish Liberals and Democrats). She has been a member of the Chamber of Representatives since 2014, and has served as group leader of the Open Flemish Liberals and Democrats since 2024. Since 2007, she has served as mayor of Berlare.
