= Zelzate =

- Municipality
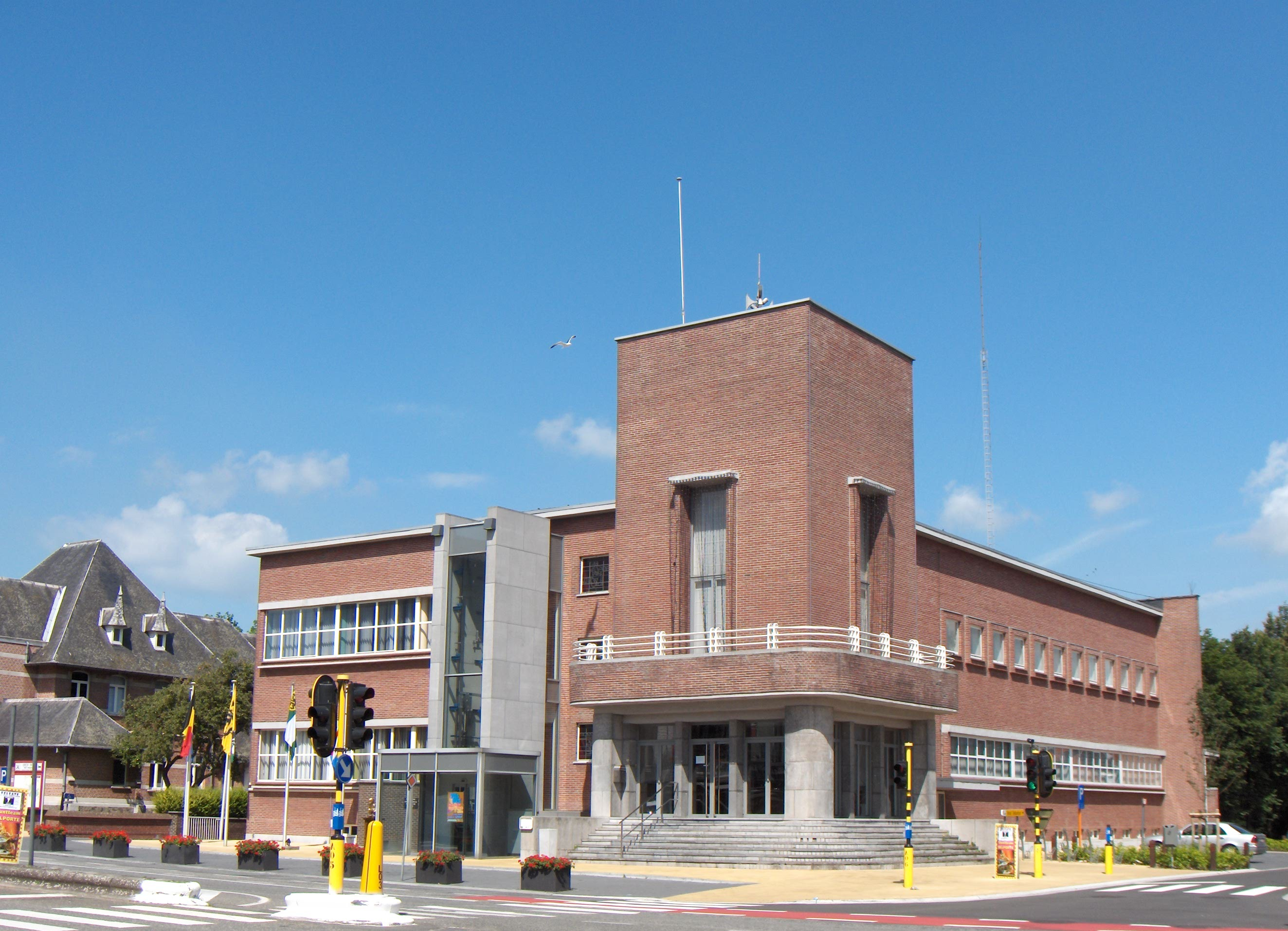
- Zelzate town hall

- Flag Coat of arms

- Location of Zelzate in East Flanders
- Interactive map of Zelzate
- Location in Belgium
- Coordinates: 51°12′N 03°49′E
- Country: Belgium
- Community: Flemish Community
- Region: Flemish Region
- Province: East Flanders
- Arrondissement: Eeklo

Government
  - Mayor: Brent Meuleman (Vooruit)
  - Governing parties: Vooruit, PVDA+

Area
  - Total: 13.77 km^{2} (5.32 sq mi)

Population (2018-01-01)
  - Total: 12,699
  - Density: 922.2/km^{2} (2,389/sq mi)
- Postal codes: 9060
- NIS code: 43018
- Area codes: 09
- Website: www.zelzate.be

Zelzate (Dutch pronunciation: [ˈzɛlzaːtə]) is a municipality located in the Belgian province of East Flanders. The municipality only comprises the town of Zelzate proper. In 2021, Zelzate had a total population of 13,124. The total area is 13.71 km^{2}.

Zelzate is divided into two parts by the Ghent–Terneuzen Canal. There is a concrete drawbridge and a tunnel to connect the two sides. Zelzate is known for the nearby polluting industry, which makes it the village with the lowest air quality in the country. Recently ArcelorMittal Ghent (Sidmar) made a major investment which resulted in an emission decrease of 90%.

== Notable citizens ==
- Eric Verpaele (b. Zelzate, 2 February 1952), writer
- Eddy Wally (b. Zelzate, 12 July 1932), singer

== Sister cities ==
The town is twinned with:

- Aubenas (France)
- Cesenatico (Italy)
- Delfzijl (Netherlands) (No longer twinned)
- Schwarzenbek (Germany)
- Sierre (Switzerland)
