= Robin Tonniau =

Belgian politician (born 1985)

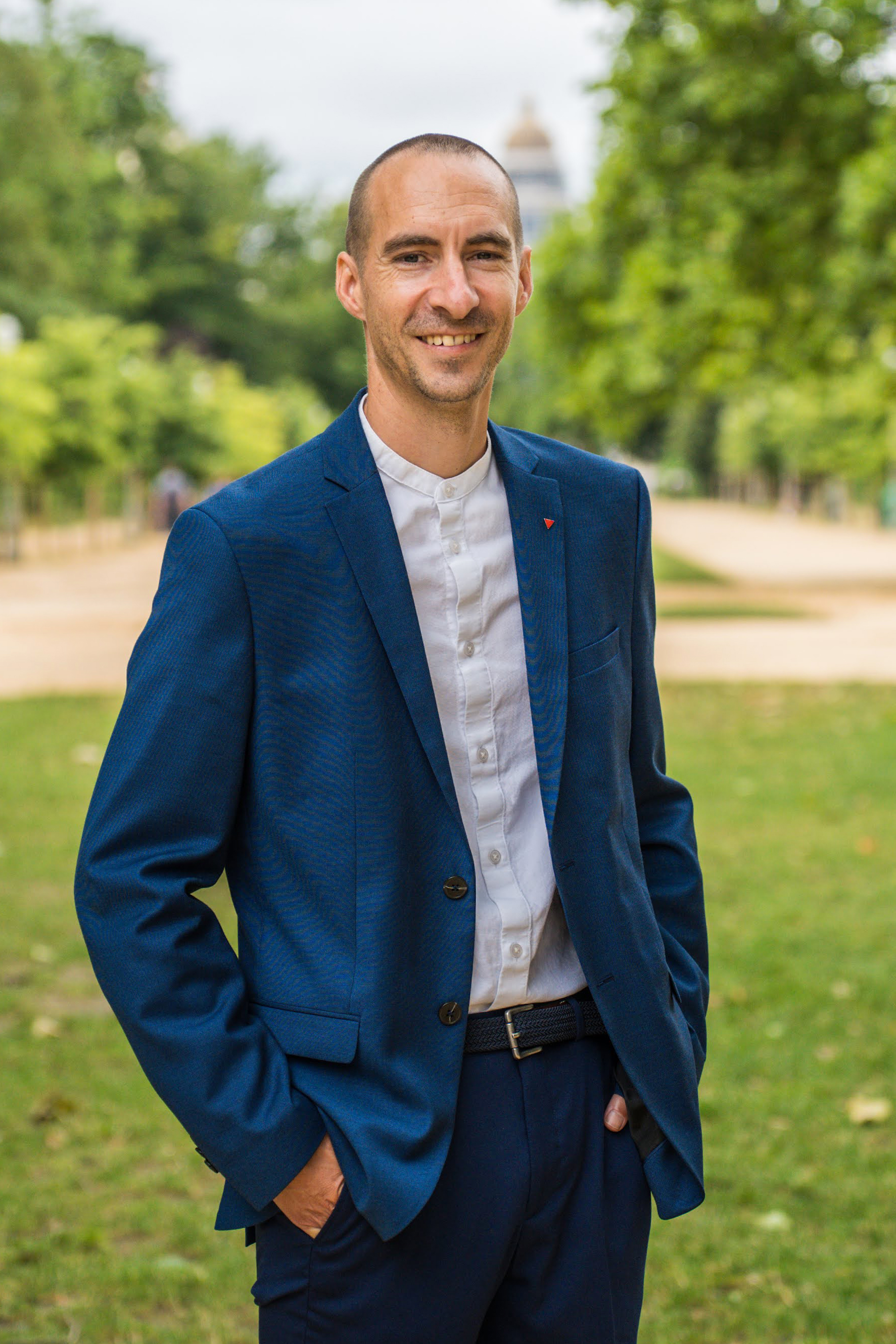
- Tonniau in July 2024

Member of the Chamber of Representatives
- Incumbent
- Assumed office 9 June 2024
- Constituency: East Flanders

Personal details
- Born: 3 May 1985 (age 40) Ronse, Belgium
- Party: Workers' Party of Belgium

Robin J. E. Tonniau (born 3 May 1985) is a Belgian politician and member of the Chamber of Representatives. A member of the Workers' Party of Belgium, he has represented East Flanders since June 2024.

Tonniau was born on 3 May 1985 in Ronse. He is an industrial worker and started working at the Volkswagen Vorst factory at the age of 18. He lost his job after production of Volkswagen models ceased at the factory. He held several jobs thereafter but eventually found employment at Volvo Car Gent.

Tonniau joined the Workers' Party of Belgium (PVDA) in 2014. He contested the 2018 local election as the PVDA's first placed candidate in Ronse but the party failed to win any seats in the municipality. He contested the 2019 federal election as the PVDA's 13th placed candidate in East Flanders but the party won only a single seat in the constituency. He was elected to the Chamber of Representatives at the 2024 federal election.

Tonniau is married and has two children.

Electoral history of Robin Tonniau
Election	Constituency	Party	Votes	Result
2018 local	Ronse	Workers' Party of Belgium	216	Not elected
2019 federal	East Flanders	Workers' Party of Belgium	1,725	Not elected
2024 federal	East Flanders	Workers' Party of Belgium	10,625	Elected
