= Leentje Grillaert =

Belgian politician (born 1980)

Member of the Chamber of Representatives
- Incumbent
- Assumed office 10 July 2024
- Constituency: East Flanders

Personal details
- Born: 5 September 1980 (age 45)
- Party: Christian Democratic and Flemish

Leentje Grillaert (born 5 September 1980) is a Belgian politician serving as a member of the Chamber of Representatives since 2024. From 2018 to 2024, she was a gedeputeerde of East Flanders.
