= Marius Meremans =

Belgian politician

Member of the Flemish Parliament
- Incumbent
- Assumed office 2019
- Preceded by: Lieven Dehandschutter

Personal details
- Born: 20 May 1967 (age 58) Dendermonde
- Party: N-VA (2001-); Volksunie (before 2001)

Marius Meremans (born 20 May 1967 in Dendermonde) is a Belgian politician for the N-VA party.

Meremans studied for a diploma in languages and worked as a schoolteacher in Dendermonde. He was a member of the former Volksunie (VU) party and served as a councilor in Dendermonde for the VU from 1995 to 1997. He later joined the N-VA faction of the party after the VU was dissolved. In 2013, he became a member of the Flemish Parliament after the resignation of Lieven Dehandschutter. He was re-elected in 2014 and 2019. In the Flemish Parliament, he serves on the Committees for Culture, Heritage, and Spatial Planning.
