= Tomas Roggeman =

Belgian politician

Member of the Chamber of Representatives
- Incumbent
- Assumed office 26 May 2019

Personal details
- Born: 1986 (age 39–40) Oudegem
- Citizenship: Belgium
- Party: New Flemish Alliance (N-VA)

Tomas Roggeman (born 30 October 1986) is a Belgian-Flemish politician and a member of the New Flemish Alliance. He has served as an MP in the Member of the Chamber of Representatives since 2019 and was chairman of the Jong N-VA, the youth wing of the N-VA.

== Biography ==
Roggeman graduated with a master's degree in history from Ghent University before beginning a doctoral degree at KU Leuven. He also worked as an associate teacher at the Vlerick Leuven Gent Management School. Between 2015 and 2019, he was chairman of the N-VA's youth wing Since 2012, he has served as a municipal councilor in Dendermonde. During the 2019 Belgian federal election, Roggeman was elected to the Chamber of Representatives for the East Flanders list.
