= Francesca Van Belleghem =

Belgian lawyer and politician

Member of the Chamber of Representatives
- Incumbent
- Assumed office 2024

Personal details
- Born: Francesca Van Belleghem; 6 January 1995 (age 31) Bruges, Belgium
- Party: Vlaams Belang
- Education: Catholic University of Leuven

Francesca Van Belleghem (born 6 January 1995) is a Belgian lawyer and politician of the Vlaams Belang party who has served as a member of the Belgian Chamber of Representatives since 2024 for the East Flanders constituency.

== Biography ==
Van Belleghem obtained a master's degree in law from the Catholic University of Leuven in 2018 followed by a degree taxation law in 2019. She worked as a lawyer in Aalst and Sint-Martens-Latem focusing on tax law before spending a year as a financial consultant for Deloitte in Antwerp.

She joined Vlaams Belang in 2021 and worked as an assistant to Barbara Pas. She was also a policy officer for the party on law and migration. In 2024, she published a book Migratiestop with VB leader Tom Van Grieken detailing the party's immigration policies. For the 2024 Belgian federal election, she stood for the East Flanders constituency and was elected to the Chamber of Representatives. She sits on the federal committees on Home Affairs, Security, Migration and Administrative Affairs.
