= Koen Daniëls =

Belgian politician

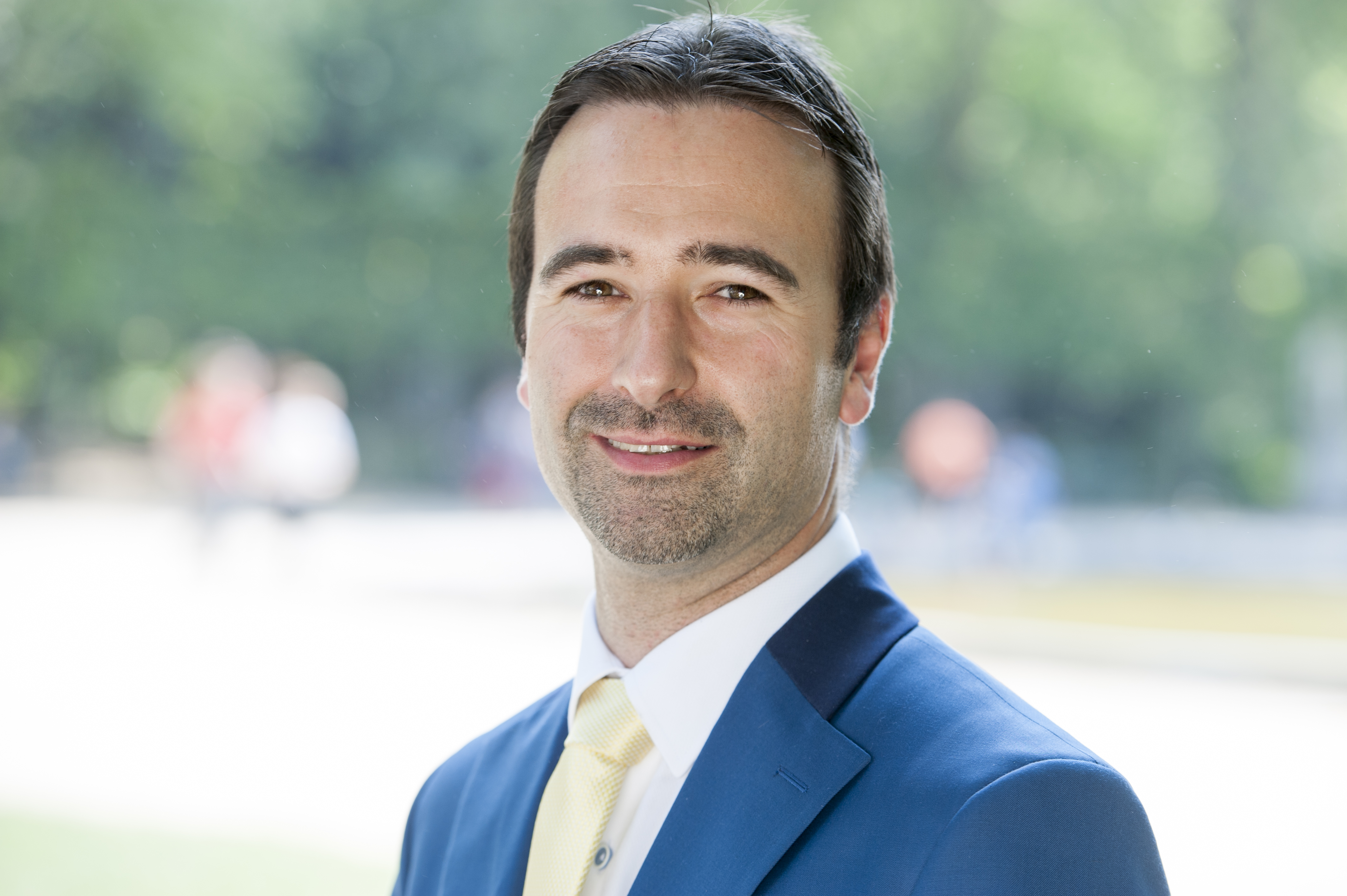

Member of the Flemish Parliament

Personal details
- Born: 17 May 1978 (age 47) Beveren
- Party: N-VA
- Occupation: politician

Koen Daniëls (born 17 May 1978) is a Belgian politician for the New Flemish Alliance (N-VA).

Daniëls became a member of the Flemish Parliament in 2014 on the East Flanders N-VA list. Because the N-VA mayor of Sint-Niklaas, Lieven Dehandschieter, did not take up his mandate in the parliament, Daniëls became a member of the Flemish Parliament in mid-June 2014 for the East Flanders electoral district . He is mainly concerned with education. In the 2019 elections, he was re-elected to the Flemish Parliament from third place on the East Flemish N-VA list. In the municipal elections of 2018, Daniëls was elected municipal councilor of Sint-Gillis-Waas.
