= Fientje Moerman =

Belgian politician

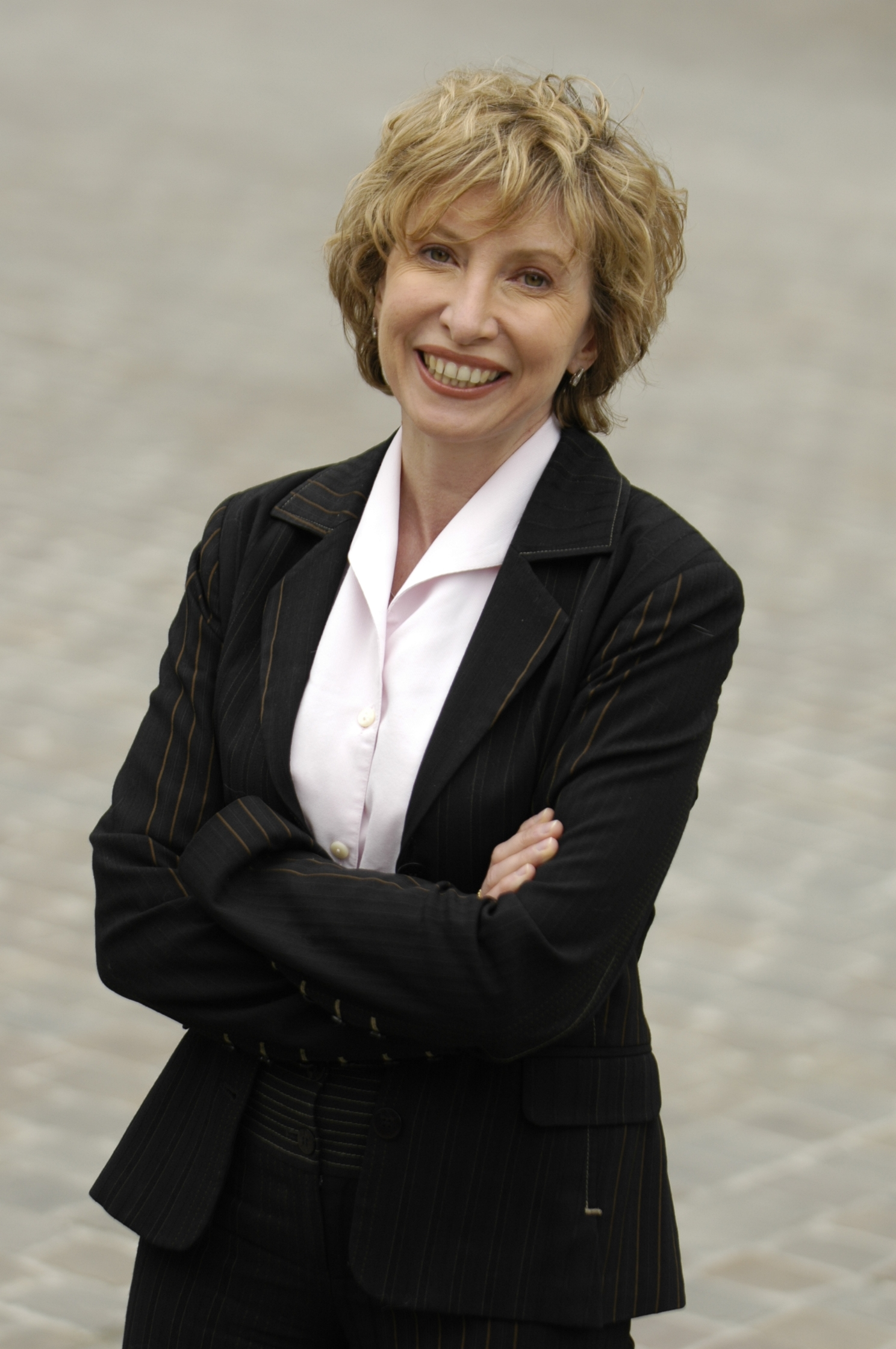
- Fientje Moerman
- Born: Joséphine Rebecca Marie Julienne Bertha Moerman; 19 October 1958 (age 67); Ghent, Belgium
- Occupations: politician, lawyer, judge

Joséphine Rebecca Marie Julienne Bertha "Fientje" Moerman (born 19 October 1958) is a Belgian liberal politician and currently a judge on the Constitutional Court of Belgium.

== Education ==
In 1981, Fientje Moerman obtained a master's degree in law. She studied law at the University of Ghent (Belgium) and Harvard University (United States).

== Professional career ==
She started her career as a lawyer in New York City and Brussels (1982–1984). Afterwards she became editor of economy and finances for the journal De Standaard (1984–1985). In the mid-1980s she was the spokeswoman of the European liberals in the European parliament and then a consultant of the French former-president Valéry Giscard d'Estaing (1985–1991). Afterwards she was a senior consultant in the European liberal fraction, was specialized in institutional reforms and relations with Israel and the Gulf States (1991–1995). During 1994–1995, she was a member of the Tindemans group. Between 1988 and 1995, she also was a municipal councillor and from 1995 up to 1999 alderman of Ghent for education. In 1999, she was elected to the Chamber of Representatives. In 2003, she joined the government of Verhofstadt II as Minister of Economy, Energy, Foreign Trade and Science Policy, but in July 2004, she left the Federal Government to become the Flemish Minister of Economy, Enterprises, Innovation, Science and Foreign Trade. She was also Deputy Minister-President of the Flemish Government.

== Hiring scandal and resignation ==
In August 2007, Moerman became embroiled in a scandal around the hiring of experts for her cabinet. Her former chief of staff Aernoudt accused her of tampering with the rules for public procurement. After a negative report around the case by the Flemish ombudsman, on 10 October 2007, Fientje Moerman resigned due to the fallout of the hiring scandal; she was replaced as vice-minister-president by Dirk Van Mechelen and as minister by Patricia Ceysens. After her resignation as minister she served as member of the Flemish Parliament (2008–2014). After the regional elections of 2014 Moerman returned to the European civil service (2014–2018).

== Judicial career ==
In 2018, Fientje Moerman was appointed by royal decree on18 March 2018 as a judge on the Constitutional Court of Belgium.

== Personal life ==
She identifies herself as an atheist.

== Sources ==
- Minister Fientje Moerman

Political offices
Preceded by Charles Picqué	Federal Minister of Economic Affairs; 2003–2004	Succeeded by Marc Verwilghen
Preceded by Annemie Neyts	Federal Minister of Foreign Trade; 2003–2004	Succeeded by Marc Verwilghen
Preceded by Patricia Ceysens	Flemish Minister of Economy; 2004–2007	Succeeded by Patricia Ceysens
Preceded by Patricia Ceysens	Flemish Minister of Foreign Trade; 2004–2007	Succeeded by Patricia Ceysens
Preceded by Charles Picqué	Federal Minister of Science Policy; 2003–2004	Succeeded by Marc Verwilghen
