= Lotte Peeters =

Belgian politician

- Incumbent
- Assumed office 9 June 2024

Member of the Chamber of Representatives

Personal details
- Born: Lotte Peeters; 9 July 1993 (age 33) Sint-Niklaas, Belgium
- Party: New Flemish Alliance
- Education: University of Ghent

Lotte Peeters (born 9 July 1993, in Sint-Niklaas) is a Belgian politician of the New Flemish Alliance party who has served as a member of the Member of the Chamber of Representatives since 2024 representing the East Flanders constituency.

== Biography ==
Peeters was born in 1993. She is the granddaughter of Walter Peeters, a former parliament federal member and the Volksunie party senator. Peeters obtained a degree in literature and modern foreign languages at the University of Ghent before completing a teacher training course. She then worked as a teacher of Dutch and German at a school in Lokeren.

She became active in politics after being elected as a municipal councilor for the New Flemish Alliance at the age of 19 in Hamme where she sat on the local committees for youth, culture and the environment. In the 2024 Belgian federal election, Peeters was elected to the Chamber of Representatives on the East Flanders list.
