= Alexander Van Hoecke =

Belgian politician

Member of the Chamber of Representatives
- Incumbent
- Assumed office 2024

Personal details
- Born: Alexander Van Hoecke; 3 May 1994 (age 32) Lokeren, Belgium
- Party: Vlaams Belang
- Education: Ghent University

Alexander Van Hoecke (born 3 May 1994 in Lokeren) is a Belgian politician of the Vlaams Belang party who has served in the Belgian Chamber of Representatives for the East Flanders constituency since 2024.

Van Hoecke graduated with a bachelor's and then a master's degree in international and European law at Ghent University. In 2020, he worked as a policy officer for Vlaams Belang in the Flemish Parliament on the areas of foreign affairs and energy. In 2023, he became the party's national press officer and media spokesperson.

During the 2024 Belgian federal election, Van Hoecke was elected to the Chamber of Representatives for the East Flanders region. He serves on the federal Justice Committee in parliament.
