= Filip Anthuenis =

Belgian politician (born 1965)

Senator
- In office 12 July 2007 – June 2011

Personal details
- Born: 28 November 1965 (age 60) Lokeren
- Party: Open VLD
- Education: Industriële Hogeschool
- Website: www.filipanthuenis.be

Filip Anthuenis (born 1965) is a Belgian politician and a member of the Open Flemish Liberals and Democrats. He was elected as a member of the Belgian Senate in 2007.

Filip Anthuenis graduated in Information Technology at the Industriële Hogeschool in Ghent. From 1995 until 2007, he was a member of the Belgian Chamber of Representatives. Since 2001, he is also the mayor of Lokeren.

== Honours ==
- 2003: Knight in the Order of Leopold.
- 2014: Officer of the Order of Leopold.
