= Werner Somers =

Belgian politician

Member of the Chamber of Representatives
- Incumbent
- Assumed office 2024

Personal details
- Born: Werner Somers; 24 January 1974 (age 52) Ninove, Belgium
- Party: Vlaams Belang
- Education: University of Ghent; Open University of the Netherlands; Vrije Universiteit Brussel

Werner Somers (born 24 January 1974 in Ninove) is a Belgian lawyer and politician of the Vlaams Belang party who was elected to the Belgian Chamber of Representatives in 2024.

== Biography ==
Somers was born in 1974 in Ninove. He is descended from the Seven Noble Houses of Brussels and remains a member of associations of the group. Somers graduated with a degree in the German language at the University of Ghent in 1996 followed by a master's degree in law at the Open University of the Netherlands where his thesis focused on the legal status of Taiwan. He first worked as a translator and then a lawyer at the European Court of Justice in Luxembourg. He finally graduated with a doctorate in Belgian law at the Vrije Universiteit Brussel in 2023.

While at the University of Ghent, he became active in the Nationalistische Studentenvereniging (NSV) and was a volunteer for the Vlaams Blok party faction in the Chamber of Representatives. In 2000, he was elected as a municipal councilor in Ninove for Forza Ninove (the local chapter of Vlaams Blok and later Vlaams Belang). He resigned as a councilor in 2016 citing difficulties with living abroad for his work. For the 2024 Belgian federal election he was elected to the Chamber of Representatives for the East Flanders region.
