= Christoph D'Haese =

Belgian politician (born 1967)

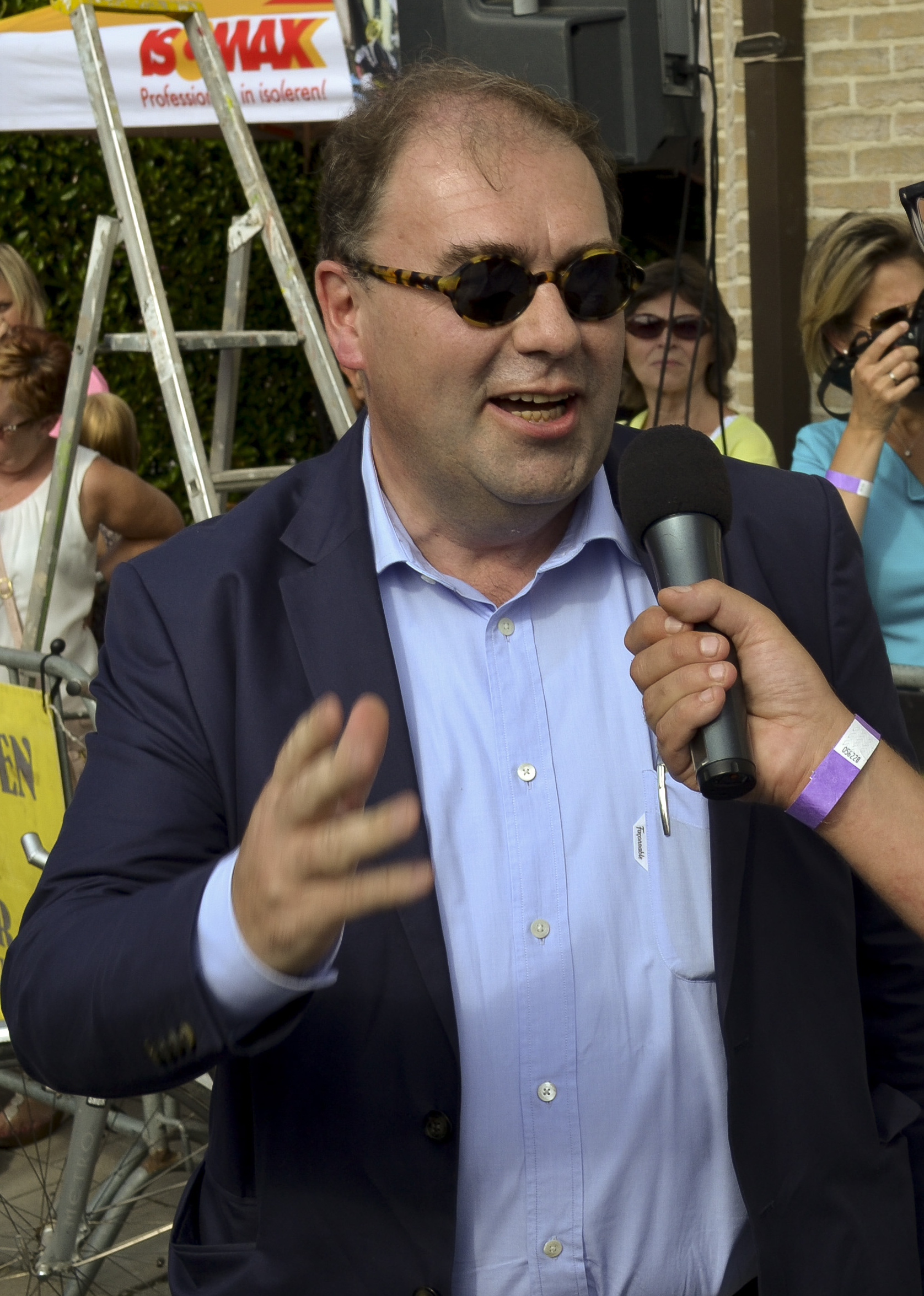

Mayor of Aalst
- Incumbent
- Assumed office 2013

Member of the Chamber of Representatives
- Incumbent
- Assumed office 2014

Personal details
- Born: 25 February 1967 (age 59) Aalst
- Party: N-VA (2011-); Open VLD (2006-2011)

Christoph D'Haese (born 25 February 1967) is a Belgian politician and is affiliated to the N-VA.

== Biography ==
D'Haese was born in 1967 in Aalst. He studied for a degree in law at the Catholic University of Leuven (KU-Leuven) and the University of Strasbourg. He worked as a lawyer specializing in criminal law and taught law at KU-Leuven. He also served on the Bar of Dendermonde until 2013. In 2006, he was elected to the municipal council of Aalst for the Open VLD party and became chairman of the local council. In 2011, he left the Open-VLD and joined the New Flemish Alliance. In 2014, he was elected as the Member of the Chamber of Representatives for the East Flanders constituency.

D'Haese has also served as the mayor of Aalst since 2013. In 2019, D'Haese became involved in a dispute with UNESCO after UNESCO threatened to remove the Aalst Carnival from its world list of cultural heritage due to what was seen as antisemitic imagery on a float at the carnival. D'Haese argued that the floats featured at the carnival were based on satire rather than racism; however, the float was condemned by fellow N-VA politician André Gantman, who is Jewish. Unia, the Belgian independent arbitrator for matters concerning discrimination, found that no laws had been broken. The incident led to widespread condemnation from multiple organizations, including the European Commission.
