= Peter Buysrogge =

Belgian politician (born 1976)

Member of the Chamber of Representatives
- Incumbent
- Assumed office 2014

Personal details
- Born: 1976 (age 49–50) Sinaai
- Citizenship: Belgium
- Party: New Flemish Alliance (N-VA)

Peter Buysrogge (born 1976) is a Belgian politician and a member of the Member of the Chamber of Representatives for the New Flemish Alliance party since 2014.

Buysrogge studied political science at Ghent University and worked as a secretary to former N-VA leader Geert Bourgeois. He has also served as an alderman for the city of Sint-Niklaas. In the federal elections of 2014, he was elected a member of the Chamber of Representatives. He was re-elected to the House in the elections of May 2019. After these elections he became chairman of the Parliamentary Defense Committee.
