= 2012 Belgian local elections =

- 14 October 2012

All 10 provincial councils All 589 municipal councils All 8 directly elected OCMW/CPAS councils All 9 Antwerp city district councils
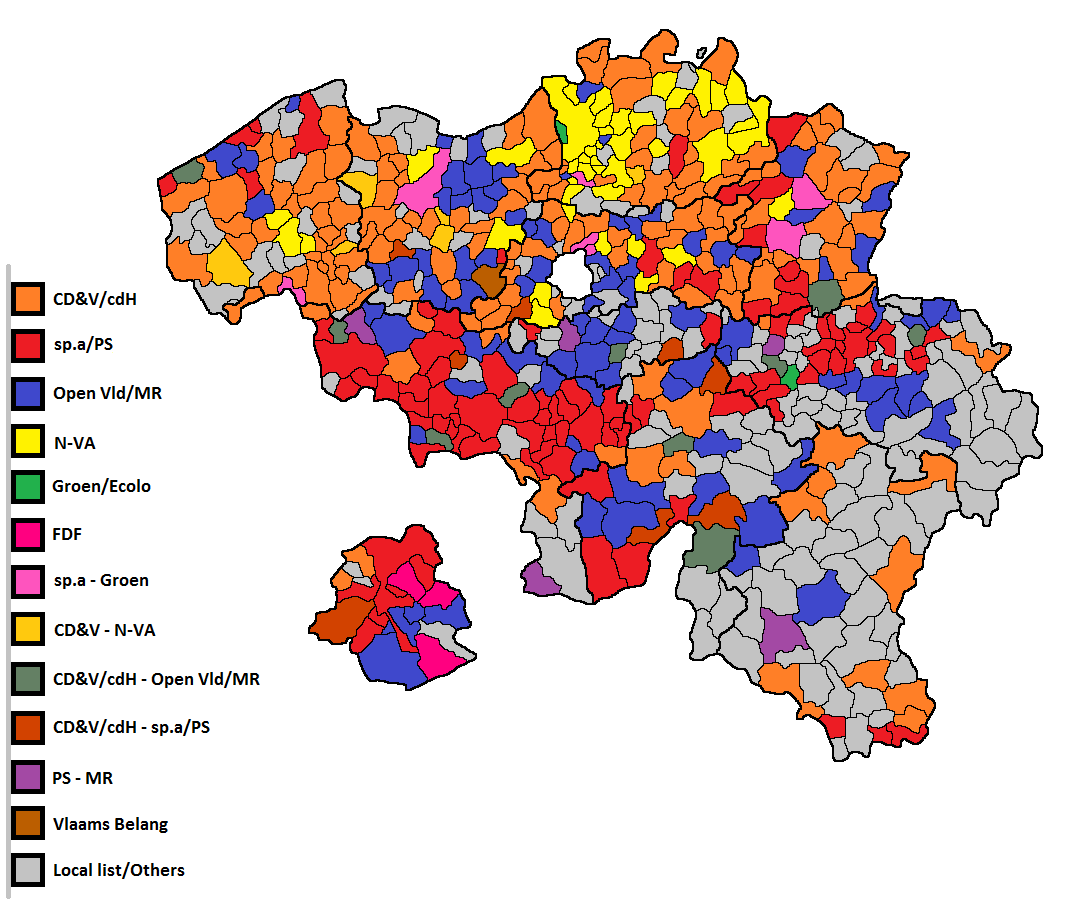

Map indicating the language areas and provinces of Belgium. Provinces are marked by the thinner black lines.: Dutch-speaking / French-speaking; German-speaking / Bilingual French/Dutch; Community: / Region: Flemish / Flanders; French and Flemish / Brussels; French / Wallonia; German-speaking / Wallonia

The Belgian provincial, municipal and district elections of 2012 took place on 14 October. As with the previous 2006 elections, these are no longer organised by the Belgian federal state but instead by the respective regions:

- Brussels with 19 municipalities
- Flanders with 5 provinces and 308 municipalities
  - In the city of Antwerp, elections were also held for its nine districts
- Wallonia with 5 provinces and 262 municipalities

In the municipalities with language facilities of Voeren, Comines-Warneton and the 6 of the Brussels Periphery, the aldermen and members of the OCMW/CPAS council are directly elected.

Mayors are not directly elected, instead the respective regional government (of Brussels, Flanders and Wallonia) appoint one of the elected municipal councillors. The councillors usually propose a candidate.

The result in Wallonia was largely a continuation of the major parties, without any big power shifts. In Flanders however, the nationalist party N-VA, which won in previous regional and federal elections, continued their success and became (one of) the largest party in many municipalities and the largest in three out of five provinces.

== Electoral system ==
=== Parties ===
National political parties are mostly separated by language community. A lot of municipalities have local parties as well as a presence of national parties. Here are the most important national parties:

- Dutch-speaking, generally contending in Flanders and Brussels: N-VA (nationalist), CD&V (Christian-democrats), sp.a (socialists), Open VLD (liberals), Groen (ecologists), Vlaams Belang (far-right), PvdA (Marxist)
- French-speaking, generally contending in Wallonia and Brussels: PS (socialists), MR (liberals), FDF (liberals), CdH (Christian-democrats), Ecolo (ecologists), FN (far-right), PTB (Marxist)
- German-speaking, generally contending in several German-speaking municipalities in Wallonia

=== Foreign residents ===
For the third time, non-Belgian EU residents may vote and be candidate for the municipal elections under the same conditions as Belgian residents, and for the second time non-Belgian non-EU residents may vote, but not be candidate, after 5 years residency. As voting is compulsory and Belgium may not impose voting on foreign residents, would-be voters from both categories have to fill a document and go to their municipal administration before August 1, 2012 to be included on the list of electors. Non-EU residents have to sign a document accepting to conform to Belgian laws and Constitution. The percentage of foreign residents who are enlisted as electors has severely declined from 2006 to 2012: from 20.9% to 14.85% for EU residents, from 15.7% to 6.30% for non-EU residents (still including Bulgarians and Rumanians in 2006).

== Brussels ==
The Brussels-Capital Region is made up of 19 municipalities (of which one is the City of Brussels) which are not part of any province.

In these municipalities, French-speaking parties are usually the largest ones, mostly PS and MR. FDF, previously forming a cartel with MR and also strong in Brussels municipalities, will now contend on its own, but dissidents from both former partners are contending on the other party's list, particularly in the municipalities where they are currently part of the majority coalition.

Dutch-speaking parties will in some municipalities form a cartel either with their French counterpart or in a larger "Mayor's List", as is the case this time between Ecolo and Groen! in all 19 municipalities, and with PS and SP.A in 17 out of 19. The only Dutch-speaking list with support from most Dutch-speaking parties is Samen (CD&V, Open VLD, SP.A and independents) in Auderghem. N-VA announced it will contend on its own in at least 10 out of the 19 municipalities. 78 Dutch-speaking Dutch-speaking candidates were elected this time in the municipal councils.

There were 613,768 registered voters, an increase of 21,746 compared to 2006. Despite compulsory voting, only 508,575 or 82.86% cast a vote, of which 29.370 were invalid votes (6.13% of votes cast). The lowest turnout was in Ixelles (80.11%), whereas Woluwe-Saint-Pierre featured the highest (87.27%). Molenbeek-Saint-Jean had the highest proportion of invalid votes (9.71%), whereas Woluwe-Saint-Pierre had the lowest (2.70%).

=== Results ===
Results are available via http://bruxelleselections2012.irisnet.be/

Municipality	Total seats	CDH (-CD&V)	Ecolo- Green	LB	MR- Open VLD	PS- sp.a	Flemish Interest	N-VA	FDF	Other
Anderlecht	47 (+2)	*	5	14		*	1			21 (PS-SP.A-CDH)
Auderghem	29 (+2)	1	4	23		2	-	-		1
Brussels	49 (+2)	10	7		10	18	-	1	3	
Etterbeek	35	4	6	17		5			3	
Evere	33 (+2)	3	4	16	6	*	-	1	4	
Forest	37 (+2)	3	7	-	10	14	-	-	3	
Ganshoren	27		2	11	6				1	7 (ProGanshoren)
Ixelles	43 (+2)	4	11	8	15	-	-	0	5	
Jette	35		4		5	10		1	1	12 (LBJ), 2 (Les Liberaux)
Koekelberg	27 (+2)	-	3	16	-	8	-	-	-	
Saint-Gilles	35	2	8	19	6	-	-	-	-	
Saint-Josse-ten-Noode	29 (+2)	5	5	16						3 (Bleus de St-Josse)
Schaerbeek	47	4	7	18	4	13	-	-		1
Sint-Agatha-Berchem	27		3		6	4		1	2	1 (Berch'm), 10 (LBR)
Sint-Jans-Molenbeek	43 (+4)	6	4	16	15	-	-	1		3
Uccle	41	3	7	-	21	5	-	-	5	
Watermael-Boitsfort	27	-	7	10	3	2	-	-	-	
Woluwe-Saint-Lambert	37 (+2)	3	3	24	6	1	-	-	-	
Woluwe-Saint-Pierre	33	-	3	14	-	1	-	-		15

== Flanders ==
The five provincial councils were up for election, as well as the municipal councils of all 308 municipalities along with the district councils in the city of Antwerp and the OCMW councils in seven municipalities with language facilities for French speakers.

=== Background and general trends ===
The nationalist party N-VA became the largest party in the 2010 federal election. It was expected that the party would now achieve a number of seats in many Flemish municipalities, which was indeed the case. Local lists include cartels between two parties and independents, varying from one municipality to another, e.g. SP.A and CD&V in the city of Antwerp, but SP.A and Groen! in the districts of Antwerp and in Ghent, Open VLD and Groen! (and a splinter group from the CD&V) in Mechelen.

Parties on the right, CD&V, Open VLD and Vlaams Belang, generally lose votes in previous elections whereas N-VA has grown a lot.

The socialist party SP.A is especially successful in large cities, but has slightly been losing votes in previous elections too.

The green party Groen remains stable with a relatively low percentage of votes.

Results are available via http://vlaanderenkiest.be/verkiezingen2012/

Voting being mandatory but unenforced, turnout was lowest in Antwerp city (85.56%), specifically the city centre district (82.98%), as well as Oostende (85.98%), followed mostly by the linguistically sensitive municipalities in the Brussels Periphery.

=== Provincial elections ===
The provincial councils of Antwerp, Flemish Brabant, East Flanders, West Flanders and Limburg were elected. The number of councillors has been reduced.

In East Flanders, Flemish Brabant and especially Antwerp, N-VA became the largest party in the province, followed by CD&V. In Limburg and West Flanders, CD&V remained the biggest party followed by N-VA.

Province	Total seats	CD&V	Vlaams Belang	Groen	N-VA	Open VLD	PVDA+	SP.A	UF
Antwerp	72 (▼12)	16.8 (13)	10.8 (7)	9.3 (6)	35.9 (27)	10.1 (7)	3.4 (2)	12.8 (10)	—
East Flanders	72 (▼12)	19.8 (15)	9.3 (6)	9 (6)	26.1 (21)	19.3 (15)	1.7 (0)	12.7 (9)	—
Flemish Brabant	72 (▼12)	19.5 (15)	6.7 (5)	9.6 (7)	25.8 (19)	16.8 (13)	1.2 (0)	12.1 (8)	7.1 (5)
Limburg	63 (▼12)	27.5 (18)	9.1 (6)	†	26.1 (17)	14.1 (9)	2.2 (0)	20.1 (13)†	—
West Flanders	72 (▼12)	27.6 (21)	7.7 (5)	7.5 (4)	25.3 (20)	13.4 (10)	1.3 (0)	15.8 (12)	—
Total	351 (▼60)								

Party	Votes	%	+/– (2006)	Seats	+/– (2006)
New Flemish Alliance (N-VA)	1,165,938	28.5	*	104	*
Christian Democratic and Flemish (CD&V)	877,019	21.5	*	82	*
Open Flemish Liberals and Democrats (Open VLD)	595,932	14.6	▼4.4	54	
Socialist Party–Different (SP.A)	580,078	11.5	▼7.7	51†	
Flemish Interest (VB)	365,439	8.9	▼12.6	29	
Green	314,538	7.7	▲0.1	24†	
Union des Francophones (UF)	48,920	1.2		5	▼1
Workers' Party of Belgium (PVDA+)	84,037	2.1	▲2.1	2	▲2
Other parties	55,284	1.4		—	
Valid votes	4,087,185				
Invalid votes					
Blanco votes					
Total				351	

† In Limburg: coalition SP.A - Groen. Only one of the 13 elected candidates (Hassan Amaghlaou) is a member of Groen.

=== Municipal elections ===
Below are the results for the municipal council elections of the eight most populous cities, which include the five provincial capitals.

==== Aalst ====
After the election, Christoph D'Haese became mayor of Aalst (in East Flanders), succeeding Ilse Uyttersprot.

Aalst City Council election, 2012
Party	Main candidate	Votes	%	±%
N-VA	Christoph D'Haese (15 seats won)	17,312	31.1%	
CD&V	Ilse Uyttersprot (8 seats won)	9,618	17.3%	
Open Vld	Jean-Jacques De Gucht (7 seats won)	9,616	17.3%	
sp.a	Ann Van de Steen (7 seats won)	9,114	16.4%	
Flemish Interest	Michel Van Brempt (4 seats won)	6,003	10.8%	–12
Groen	Andreas Verleysen (2 seats won)	3,268	5.9%	+1.2
PVDA-PTB	Romain Dierickx (no seats won)	661	1.2%	+0.5

==== Antwerp ====
A lot of attention goes to the city of Antwerp, where Bart De Wever, the president of N-VA, wants to become mayor and put an end to decades of socialist mayors, the current one being Patrick Janssens (sp.a). Christian-democrat CD&V and socialist sp.a will form one list. Also Wouter Van Besien (president of Groen) is contending for the position of mayor, and Filip Dewinter of extreme-right Vlaams Belang is campaigning in Antwerp. According to a poll, N-VA would get 42,9% of the votes, giving 26 out of 55 seats in the municipal party, and 46,5% would like to see De Wever become the new mayor.

Antwerp City Council election, 2012
Party	Main candidate	Votes	%	±%
N-VA	Bart De Wever (23 seats won)	102,795	37.7%	
sp.a-CD&V joint list	Patrick Janssens (17 seats won)	77,867	28.6%	
Flemish Interest	Filip Dewinter (5 seats won)	27,824	10.2%	
PVDA-PTB	Peter Mertens (4 seats won)	21,720	8.0%	+6.2
Groen	Meyrem Almaci (4 seats won)	21,658	7.9%	+3.2
Open Vld	Annemie Turtelboom (2 seats won)	15,098	5.5%	
Others	(no seats won)	5,473	2.0%	

==== Bruges ====
In Bruges (capital of West Flanders), the incumbent mayor Patrick Moenaert (CD&V), who led a coalition of CD&V/N-VA, SP.A and VLD (which were all represented parties except Groen and VB), quit so all possibilities remained open. Polls gave CD&V, SP.A and N-VA as major parties.

Bruges City Council election, 2012
Party	Main candidate	Votes	%	±%
sp.a	Renaat Landuyt (14 seats won)	21,567	26.8%	
CD&V	Dirk De fauw (13 seats won)	21,404	26.6%	
N-VA	Anne Minne-Soete (10 seats won)	15,948	19.8%	
Open Vld	Mercedes Van Volcem (5 seats won)	8,859	11.0%	
Groen	Sammy Roelant (3 seats won)	7,123	8.8%	+2.3
Flemish Interest	Alain Quataert (2 seats won)	4,350	5.4%	–10.8
Others	(no seats won)	1,327	1.7%	

==== Gent ====
In Ghent (capital of East Flanders), the incumbent mayor Daniël Termont is very popular. SP.A, his party, now formed a cartel with Groen. Polls predict the cartel will get about 43% of the votes. The parties Open VLD of Mathias De Clercq and N-VA of Siegfried Bracke follow after a gap.

Ghent City Council election, 2012
Party	Main candidate	Votes	%	±%
sp.a-Groen	Daniël Termont (25 seats won)	69,356	45.5%	
N-VA	Siegfried Bracke (9 seats won)	26,064	17.1%	
Open Vld	Mathias De Clercq (9 seats won)	25,167	16.5%	
CD&V	Veli Yüksel (4 seats won)	13,834	9.1%	
Flemish Interest	Johan Deckmyn (3 seats won)	9,966	6.5%	–11.5
PVDA-PTB	Tom De Meester (no seats won)	4,431	2.9%	+1.9
Others	(no seats won)	3,694	2.4%	

==== Hasselt ====
Hasselt City Council election, 2012
Party	Main candidate	Votes	%	±%
Helemaal Hasselt	Hilde Claes (15 seats won)	16,987	33.0%	
N-VA	Steven Vandeput (11 seats won)	13,130	25.5%	
CD&V	Ivo Belet (10 seats won)	21,404	26.6%	
Groei met Open Vld	Laurence Libert (4 seats won)	5,096	9.9%	
Flemish Interest	Katleen Martens (1 seat won)	2.845	5,5%	–8.4
Leefbaar Hasselt	Jan Marechal (no seats won)	1.677	3,3%	

==== Kortrijk ====
Vincent Van Quickenborne became mayor of Kortrijk (in West Flanders), with a coalition of Open Vld, N-VA and sp.a, defeating incumbent mayor Stefaan De Clerck and his CD&V, thereby ending a 150-year period of Catholic and Christian democratic mayors in the city.

Kortrijk City Council election, 2012
Party	Main candidate	Votes	%	±%
CD&V	Stefaan De Clerck (15 seats won)	16,666	33%	
Open Vld	Vincent Van Quickenborne (9 seats won)	10,771	21.3%	–0.2
N-VA	Rudolf Scherpereel (7 seats won)	8,247	16.3%	
sp.a	Philippe De Coene (6 seats won)	7,222	14.3%	
Groen	Bart Caron (2 seats won)	3,715	7.4%	+1.8
Flemish Interest	Maarten Seynaeve (2 seats won)	3,072	6.1%	–8.3
Others	(no seats won)	841	1.7%	

==== Leuven ====
In Leuven (capital of Flemish Brabant), polls indicated that SP.A, the party of incumbent mayor Louis Tobback, would still be the largest. N-VA, CD&V and Groen follow after a gap.

Leuven City Council election, 2012
Party	Main candidate	Votes	%	±%
sp.a	Louis Tobback (16 seats won)	18,300	31.4%	
N-VA	Danny Pieters (9 seats won)	11,091	19.0%	
CD&V	Carl Devlies (9 seats won)	10,780	18.5%	
Groen	Fatiha Dahmani (7 seats won)	9,008	15.5%	+4.2
Open Vld / LEUVEN+	Rik Daems (3 seats won)	4,561	7.8%	
Flemish Interest	Hagen Goyvaerts (1 seat won)	2,173	3.7%	–7.9
PVDA-PTB	Tine Van Rompuy (no seats won)	1,656	2.8%	+1.7
Others	(no seats won)	674	1.1%	

==== Mechelen ====
Bart Somers (Open Vld), mayor since 2001, continued after the elections with his "vld-Groen-m+ city list", but with N-VA and CD&V as coalition partners instead of sp.a. Sp.a became opposition, along with a significantly reduced Vlaams Belang.

Mechelen City Council election, 2012
Party	Main candidate	Votes	%	±%
vld-Groen-m+	Bart Somers (16 seats won)	17,900	33.9%	
N-VA	Marc Hendrickx (11 seats won)	12,244	23.2%	
sp.a	Caroline Gennez (8 seats won)	9,610	18.2%	
CD&V	Walter Schroons (5 seats won)	6,524	12.4%	
Flemish Interest	Frank Creyelman (3 seats won)	4,589	8.7%	–17.8
PVDA-PTB	Dirk Tuypens (no seats won)	1,610	3.0%	+2.4
Bewoners Partij	Jan Mussin (no seats won)	328	0.6%	

== Wallonia ==
PS and MR are generally the two largest parties, followed by Ecolo and CDH. In the province of Luxembourg, CDH is generally more successful. No major trends or shifts were expected nor happened.

Results are available via https://web.archive.org/web/20121015010835/http://elections2012.wallonie.be/results/fr/

=== Provincial elections ===
The provincial councils of Namur, Walloon Brabant, Liège, Hainaut and Luxembourg were elected. The number of councillors has been reduced.

Province	Total seats	CDH		CSP		Ecolo		FDF		MR		PFF-MR		PS		PTB+		SP	
Hainaut	56 (▼28)	14.39%	6 (▼9)	—		10.88%	4 (▼1)	2.3%	0	23.17%	16 (▼7)	—		39.68%	30 (▼8)	2.5%	0	—	
Liège	56 (▼28)	13.76%	7 (▼6)	1.72%	1 (▲1)	14.76%	8 (▼3)	1.7%	0	25.16%	16 (▼6)	1.74%	1 (▲1)	32.22%	20 (▼12)	4.71%	2 (▲2)	0.72%	1 (▲1)
Luxembourg	37 (▼10)	34.95%	14 (▼8)	—		11.58%	2 (▼1)	1.8%	0	26.06	11 (▼6)	—		23.03%	10 (▼4)	0.6%	0	—	
Namur	37 (▼19)	19.87%	8 (▼6)	—		13.97%	4 (▼3)	2.4%	0	29.79%	13 (▼4)	—		27.82%	12 (▼6)	2.1%	0	—	
Walloon Brabant	37 (▼19)	12.26%	5 (▼4)	—		16.29	6 (▼3)	4.78%	2 (▲2)	42.44%	17 (▼7)	—		17.33%	7 (▼5)	0.8%	0	—	
Total	223 (▼104)	16,96%*	40		1	13,17%	24	2,41%	2	27,71%*	73		1	31,99%*	79	2,77%	2		1

- * includes the votes of the German-speaking sister party of Liegé province

=== Municipal elections ===
City (Provincial capital)	CDH	Ecolo	MR	PS	Other
Arlon	11	4	6	8	—
Liège	7	6	11	22	3
Mons	3	3	8	29	2
Namur	16	6	10	15	—
Wavre	3	4	*	4	20 (LB)
