= Ortwin Depoortere =

Belgian politician

Member of the Chamber of Representatives
- Incumbent
- Assumed office 26 May 2019

Member of the Flemish Parliament
- In office 2015–2019

Member of the Chamber of Representatives
- In office 2004–2007

Personal details
- Born: 23 October 1970 (age 55) Izegem, Belgium
- Party: Vlaams Belang (2004-present); Vlaams Blok (1995-2004)

Ortwin Depoortere (born 23 October 1970) is a Belgian politician for the Vlaams Belang party who has twice served as a member of the Chamber of Representatives for the VB.

Depoortere was originally active in the NSV and then the former Vlaams Blok party. He was also a member of the Chamber of Representatives for the East Flanders electoral district from July 2004 until the 2007 elections for Vlaams Belang. In 2015, he was appointed to the Flemish Parliament to take over from former VB representative Barbara Bonte who resigned for personal reasons before taking her seat. In the 2019 Belgian federal election, Depoortere returned to the Chamber of Representatives.
