= Freya Van den Bossche =

Belgian politician

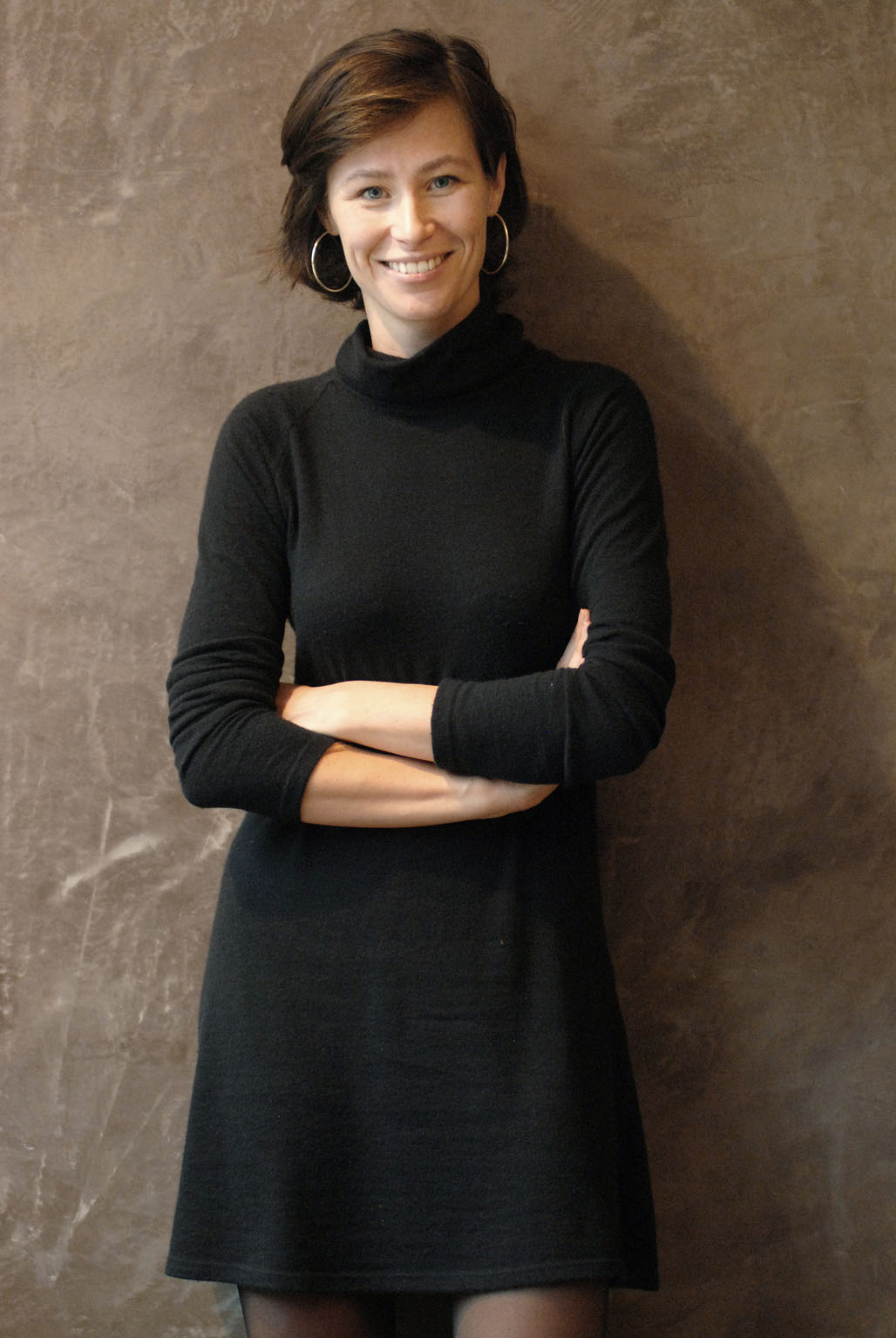

Speaker of the Flemish Parliament
- Incumbent
- Assumed office 8 January 2025
- Preceded by: Liesbeth Homans

Personal details
- Born: 26 March 1975 (age 51) Ghent, Belgium
- Spouse(s): Tobias Wurm (1999–2005); Dennis Van de Weghe (2006–2007); Willem Wallyn (2008–2015); Eva Vettenberg (2017?–)
- Children: 3
- Occupation: politician

Freya Van den Bossche (born 26 March 1975) is a Belgian (Flemish) politician and daughter of former Belgian politician Luc Van den Bossche. She is member of the SP.a political party, and she was Deputy Prime Minister and Minister of Budget and Consumer Protection in the Belgian federal government. She was the youngest ever minister appointed in Belgium.

== Education and career ==
Freya Van den Bossche followed her secondary education at the Royal Atheneum Voskenslaan in Ghent. She studied law from 1993 to 1995 at the University of Ghent, but did not obtain a degree, and ultimately graduated from the University of Ghent with a master's degree in Communication Sciences in 1999. From 1996 to 1997, she studied at the University of Amsterdam as part of an exchange programme.

In 2006, while she was vice-premier in the federal government, Knack, a prominent Flemish magazine in Belgium alleged that she had not written the obligatory thesis for her master's degree herself. Rather, due to the complexity of the thesis she submitted, Knack journalist Koen Meulenaere alleged that the thesis had actually been written by Frank De Moor, also a former Knack journalist and a friend of Freya Van den Bossche's father, the prominent socialist politician, Luc Van den Bossche. Knack posted a version of her thesis online, but offered no other proof. Freya Van den Bossche subsequently submitted a criminal complaint against Koen Meulenaere for slander and defamation. In response to a question posed by the Flemish newspaper Het Laatste Nieuws on whether she did in fact write her thesis, Ms. Van den Bossche replied: "Would that make a difference? I can show you my notes because I have nothing to hide". Knack ultimately removed the thesis from its website and ceased coverage of the matter.

From 1999 to 2000, she found employment as an Attachée, responsible for communication and drug-related problems, of the then Mayor of Ghent Frank Beke.

Freya first came to national attention in Belgium in a televised debating competition between candidates in a municipal election who were the children of well-known politicians.

== Federal minister ==
She was quickly promoted and was put on her Social Democrat Party's list in East Flanders for the federal parliament in 2003, attracting 105,000 votes. On 12 July 2003, she was appointed the youngest minister in Belgium's history appointed aged 28 as Minister of Environment, Consumer Affairs and Sustainable Development in Government Verhofstadt II. In July 2004, she became responsible for Work and Consumer Affairs. After the departure of Johan Vande Lanotte in October 2005, she was again promoted, this time to become the nation's Deputy Prime Minister and Minister of Budget and Consumer Affairs. She lost that position in 2008, when the government fell.

In a recent poll she was rated as the seventh most popular politician in Belgium. A Spanish newspaper included her in an internet poll of the world's most beautiful female politicians.

Time magazine wrote about her:

But by the time she ran for national parliament as a Flemish Socialist (SP.A) candidate in 2003, the law required that both sexes be represented in the top three slots on every party list – so her name was placed in a vote-getting position no novice male would have enjoyed. And part of her popularity, it must be said, has to do with her bright blue eyes and throaty voice. Van den Bossche regularly pops up on "sexiest Belgians" lists. "Some people assume I'm here because of my looks or because of parity laws," she says. "My job is to prove them wrong. Maybe these factors have helped, but I hope that in four years, people will be talking about my policies."

== Personal life ==
Van den Bossche has two daughters and one son. On 29 December 2006, Van den Bossche married Dennis Van de Weghe from Ghent, one of her former cabinet colleagues. The marriage did not last long, with the couple separating shortly after. She also has a son with Willem Wallyn. She is currently in a relationship with another woman, named Eva Vettenberg.
