= Mathias De Clercq =

Flemish politician

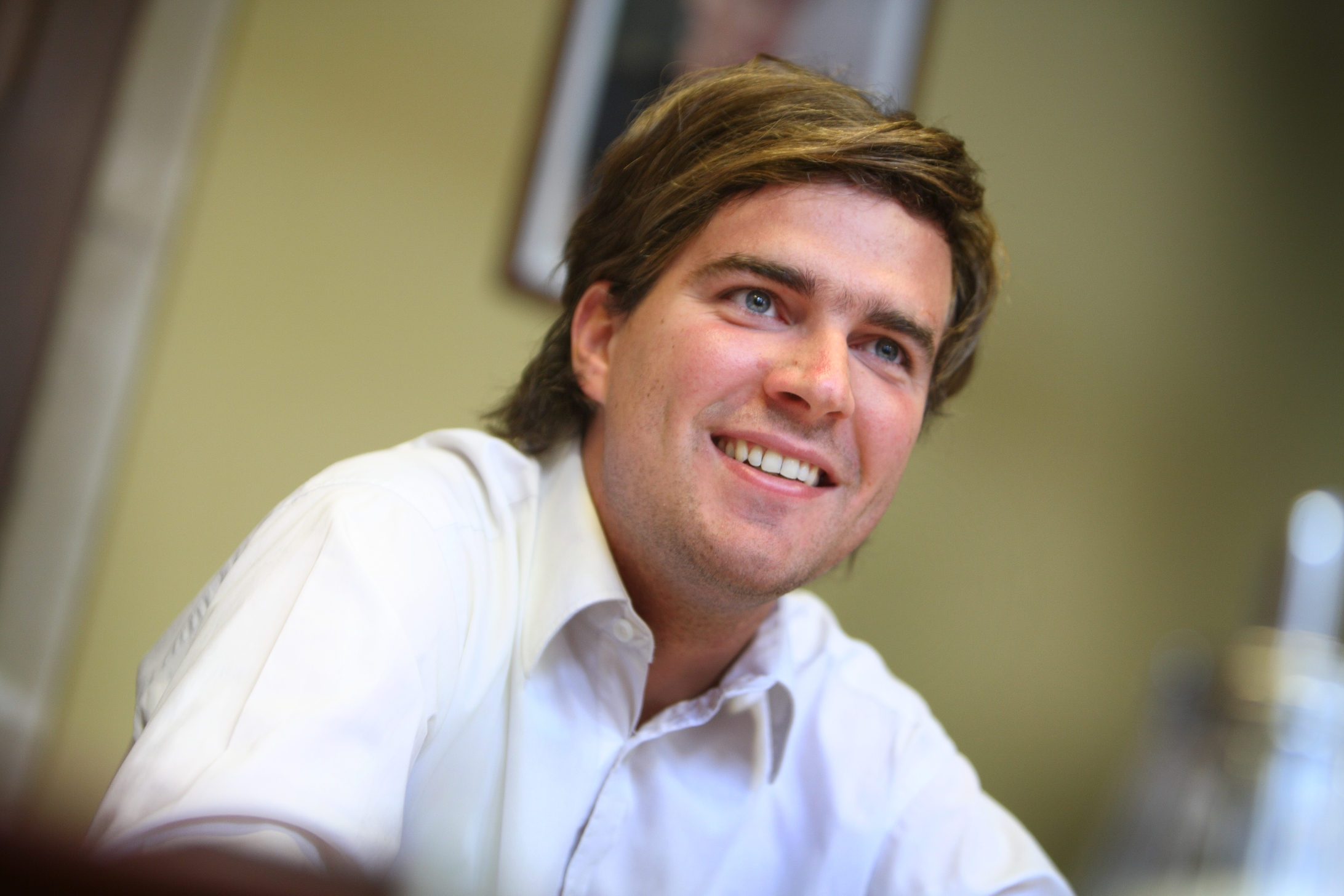
- Mathias De Clercq
- Born: Mathias De Clercq; 1981 (age 44–45); Ghent
- Occupation: politician
- Known for: Mayor of Ghent and President of Eurocities

Mathias Toon Cecil Willy De Clercq (born 26 December 1981, Ghent) is a Belgian politician. He is a member of the Flemish liberal party. At the moment he is the mayor of Ghent. From 2007 until 2014, he was a federal representative, and from 2014 until 2019, he was a Flemish representative. From 2007 until 2019, he was a schepen in Ghent. He belongs to the social liberal wing of his party.

De Clercq was born in Ghent, son of lawyer and alderman Yannick Frans de Clercq (1954), grand officer of the Order of Leopold II. He is the grandson of Viscount Willy De Clercq, a former European Commissioner.

Since June 2025 De Clercq has also served as President of the Eurocities network.
