= Kathleen Depoorter =

Belgian politician (born 1971)

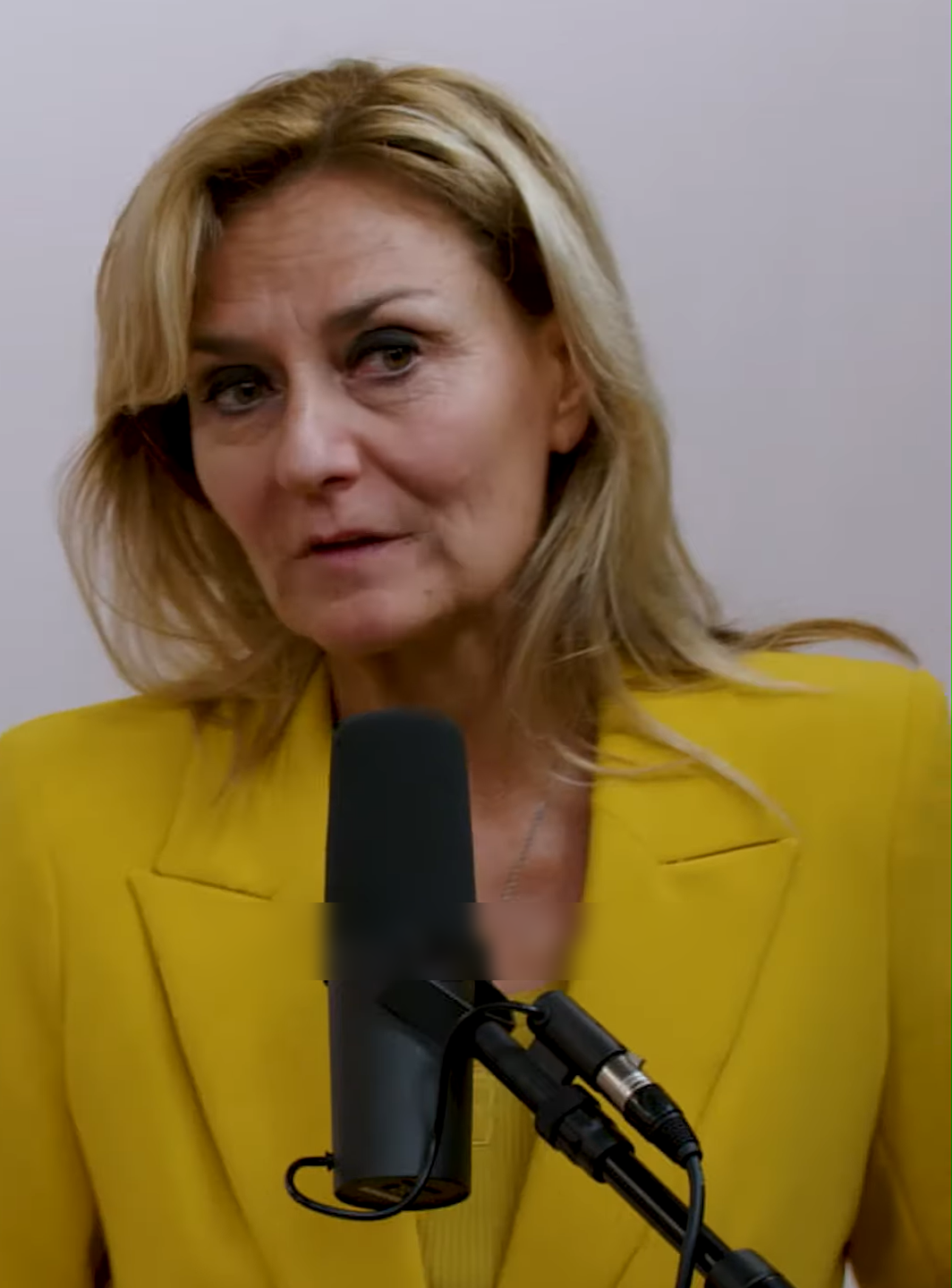

Member of the Chamber of Representatives
- Incumbent
- Assumed office 29 June 2019

Personal details
- Born: 1971 (age 54–55) Bruges
- Citizenship: Belgium
- Party: New Flemish Alliance (N-VA)

Kathleen Depoorter (born 5 September 1971) is a Belgian politician and a member of the Member of the Chamber of Representatives for the N-VA party.

== Biography ==
Since the municipal elections of 2012, Depoorter has been a municipal councilor for the N-VA in Evergem. She has also served as an alderman for finance and budget, public health, local economy, international cooperation and animal welfare in Evergem. In the 2018 municipal elections, she was re-elected as a municipal councilor and continued to serve as alderman with the same portfolio of competences. From 2017 to 2018 she was also a provincial councilor for East Flanders. Depoorter was elected a member of the Chamber of Representatives for the East Flanders electoral district in the elections of 26 May 2019.

Before entering politics, Depoorter was the manager and owner of a pharmacy store.
