= Preferential voting =

Election systems

Preferential voting or preference voting (PV) is a collective name in Australian English for several different, but related electoral systems – a subset of ranked voting. Many preferential voting systems originated in, or were refined in, state or national Australia.

As such, preferential voting may refer to any electoral system that allows a voter to indicate multiple preferences. As such, this includes systems in which an individual makes multiple, weighted votes for more than one candidate (or list) and/or contingent vote (i.e. any system other than plurality voting or anti-plurality voting).

== Types ==
- Instant-runoff voting, used in single member elections (e.g.) for the Australian House of Representatives.
- Single transferable vote, as used in many countries with proportional representation involving party lists, including (e.g.) elections for the Australian Senate.
  - Open list representation – a form of party-list proportional representation where the voter indicates their preferences for individual candidates instead of for a party list (and one of two options in elections for the Australian Senate).
- Optional preferential voting, in which a voter may opt to vote for only one candidate or list – (e.g.) this is an option available in elections for the Australian Senate
- Bucklin voting, a system used historically in some parts of the United States.

== See also ==
- Electoral system
- Rated voting
- Social choice theory
- Weighted voting
