= West Flanders (Chamber of Representatives constituency) =

Belgium parliamentary constituency

- West-Vlaanderen; Flandre-Occidentale; Westflandern
- Constituency for the Chamber of Representatives
- Location of West Flanders within Belgium
- Province: West Flanders
- Region: Flanders
- Population: 1,231,585 (2025)
- Electorate: 952,999 (2024)
- Area: 3,197 km^{2} (2024)

Current Constituency
- Created: 2003
- Seats: 16 (2003–present)
- Members: List: Jean-Marie Dedecker (NV-A); Franky Demon (CD&V); Maaike De Vreese (NV-A); Natalie Eggermont (PVDA); Annick Lambrecht (Vooruit); Nathalie Muylle (CD&V); Kurt Ravyts (VB); Axel Ronse (NV-A); Jeroen Soete (Vooruit); Dominiek Spinnewyn-Sneppe (VB); Matti Vandemaele (Groen); Vincent Van Quickenborne (Open Vld); Kristien Verbelen (VB); Charlotte Verkeyn (NV-A); Wouter Vermeersch (VB); Axel Weydts (Vooruit)
- Created from: List: Bruges; Kortrijk-Roeselare-Tielt; Veurne-Diksmuide-Ostend-Ypres

West Flanders (Dutch: West-Vlaanderen; French: Flandre-Occidentale; German: Westflandern) is one of the 11 multi-member constituencies of the Chamber of Representatives, the lower house of the Belgian Federal Parliament, the national legislature of Belgium. The constituency was established in 2003 following the re-organisation of constituencies across Belgium along provincial lines. It is conterminous with the province of West Flanders. The constituency currently elects 16 of the 150 members of the Chamber of Representatives using the open party-list proportional representation electoral system. At the 2024 federal election the constituency had 952,999 registered electors.

== Electoral system ==
West Flanders currently elects 16 of the 150 members of the Chamber of Representatives using the open party-list proportional representation electoral system. Seats are allocated using the D'Hondt method. Only parties that reach the 5% threshold in the constituency compete for seats.

Electors may vote for the list (party) or for individual candidates, either main candidates or substitute candidates or a combination, on the list. They may vote for as many candidates as there are seats in the constituency. Split-ticket voting (panachage) is not permitted and will result in the ballot paper being invalidated. The minimum number of votes a candidate must obtain to get elected - the quotient - is calculated as the total votes received by the party divided by the number of seats in the constituency plus one. Half the ballot papers where there are no votes for main candidates (i.e. the elector has voted for the list or for substitute candidates only) are redistributed amongst main candidates in the order they appear on the ballot paper so that the candidate's total votes (personal votes plus redistributed votes) equals the quotient. The seats won by the party are then allocated to the candidates with the most number of total votes.

== Election results ==
=== Summary ===
Election	Workers PVDA			Groen Groen / Agalev			Vooruit Vooruit / SP.A / SP.A-Spirit			Liberals & Democrats Open Vld / VLD			Christian Democrats CD&V			New Flemish N-VA / CD&V-N-VA			Vlaams Belang VB / VB		
Election	Votes	%	Seats	Votes	%	Seats	Votes	%	Seats	Votes	%	Seats	Votes	%	Seats	Votes	%	Seats	Votes	%	Seats
2024	44,129	5.34%	1	45,502	5.50%	1	137,422	16.62%	3	65,840	7.96%	1	121,447	14.68%	2	192,037	23.22%	4	202,800	24.52%	4
2019	29,205	3.62%	0	63,870	7.92%	1	118,512	14.70%	2	105,192	13.04%	2	142,512	17.67%	3	172,751	21.42%	4	164,427	20.39%	4
2014	13,397	1.66%	0	63,657	7.88%	1	142,406	17.63%	3	111,388	13.79%	2	175,669	21.74%	4	230,265	28.50%	6	38,232	4.73%	0
2010	6,489	0.83%	0	49,533	6.31%	1	118,803	15.13%	3	106,265	13.53%	2	180,702	23.01%	4	188,317	23.98%	4	71,200	9.07%	1
2007	4,621	0.57%	0	46,763	5.82%	1	131,764	16.39%	2	133,238	16.58%	3				274,888	34.20%	6	115,982	14.43%	2
2003	2,110	0.27%	0	25,577	3.22%	0	197,669	24.91%	4	172,307	21.72%	4	212,932	26.84%	5	55,292	6.97%	1	111,795	14.09%	2

(Figures in italics represent alliances.)

=== Detailed ===
==== 2024 ====
Results of the 2024 federal election held on 9 June 2024:

Party		Votes per arrondissement									Total Votes	%	Seats
Party		Bruges	Diks- muide	Kortrijk	Ostend	Roese- lare	Tielt	Veurne	Ypres	Expat- riates	Total Votes	%	Seats
Vlaams Belang	VB	41,076	10,528	47,661	27,577	28,721	17,543	9,204	19,178	1,312	202,800	24.52%	4
New Flemish Alliance	N-VA	47,864	6,809	46,488	25,053	23,603	14,764	12,815	13,269	1,372	192,037	23.22%	4
Vooruit	Vooruit	33,596	5,543	34,545	19,699	15,807	9,022	6,014	12,313	883	137,422	16.62%	3
Christian Democratic and Flemish	CD&V	28,607	6,540	28,010	9,827	17,337	12,115	5,219	13,042	750	121,447	14.68%	2
Open Flemish Liberals and Democrats	Open Vld	16,966	2,757	14,132	8,552	6,714	5,036	4,840	5,688	1,155	65,840	7.96%	1
Groen	Groen	13,596	1,104	11,321	5,780	4,623	2,546	1,804	3,190	1,538	45,502	5.50%	1
Workers' Party of Belgium	PVDA	9,291	1,338	12,427	7,383	5,169	2,884	1,874	3,328	435	44,129	5.34%	1
For You	VU	1,988	583	2,409	1,506	971	722	600	780	141	9,700	1.17%	0
Blank Party	PB	1,817	318	2,046	1,068	907	633	357	919	113	8,178	0.99%	0
Valid votes		194,801	35,520	199,039	106,445	103,852	65,265	42,727	71,707	7,699	827,055	100.00%	16
Rejected votes		8,091	2,030	9,663	5,093	5,060	3,213	2,072	4,269	324	39,815	4.59%	
Total polled		202,892	37,550	208,702	111,538	108,912	68,478	44,799	75,976	8,023	866,870	90.96%	
Registered electors		224,511	40,548	224,692	124,837	117,914	72,953	50,580	82,125	14,839	952,999		
Turnout		90.37%	92.61%	92.88%	89.35%	92.37%	93.87%	88.57%	92.51%	54.07%	90.96%		

The following candidates were elected: Jean-Marie Dedecker (N-VA), 58,603 votes; Franky Demon (CD&V), 15,199 votes; Melissa Depraetere (Vooruit), 63,917 votes; Maaike De Vreese (N-VA), 18,512 votes; Natalie Eggermont (PVDA), 9,224 votes; Annick Lambrecht (Vooruit), 10,263 votes; Nathalie Muylle (CD&V), 37,115 votes; Kurt Ravyts (VB), 8,410 votes; Axel Ronse (N-VA), 13,323 votes; Jeroen Soete (Vooruit), 7,454 votes; Dominiek Spinnewyn-Sneppe (VB), 10,122 votes; Matti Vandemaele (Groen), 5,357 votes; Vincent Van Quickenborne (Open Vld), 14,438 votes; Kristien Verbelen (VB), 10,532 votes; Charlotte Verkeyn (N-VA), 11,500 votes; and Wouter Vermeersch (VB), 35,200 votes.

Substitutions:

- Melissa Depraetere (Vooruit) was appointed to the regional government and was substituted by Axel Weydts (Vooruit) on 3 October 2024.

==== 2019 ====
Results of the 2019 federal election held on 26 May 2019:

Party		Votes per arrondissement									Total Votes	%	Seats
Party		Bruges	Diks- muide	Kortrijk	Ostend	Roese- lare	Tielt	Veurne	Ypres	Expat- riates	Total Votes	%	Seats
New Flemish Alliance	N-VA	44,396	6,564	37,859	22,763	21,739	13,756	13,410	12,036	228	172,751	21.42%	4
Vlaams Belang	VB	33,964	8,273	39,948	21,893	24,060	14,606	6,656	14,953	74	164,427	20.39%	4
Christian Democratic and Flemish	CD&V	37,110	6,733	34,191	11,210	19,524	13,935	6,089	13,611	109	142,512	17.67%	3
Socialist Party Different	SP.A	28,223	5,829	27,790	19,015	13,611	6,993	5,960	11,009	82	118,512	14.70%	2
Open Flemish Liberals and Democrats	Open Vld	24,366	4,364	27,071	14,694	10,807	7,298	6,007	10,370	215	105,192	13.04%	2
Groen	Groen	19,496	1,694	16,254	7,867	7,280	3,657	2,554	4,764	304	63,870	7.92%	1
Workers' Party of Belgium	PVDA	6,821	1,019	7,724	4,551	3,405	1,951	1,198	2,496	40	29,205	3.62%	0
DierAnimal		3,036	351	1,936	1,721	901	581	609	772	19	9,926	1.23%	0
Valid votes		197,412	34,827	192,773	103,714	101,327	62,777	42,483	70,011	1,071	806,395	100.00%	16
Rejected votes		9,199	2,313	10,613	5,445	5,603	3,988	2,140	4,903	63	44,267	5.20%	
Total polled		206,611	37,140	203,386	109,159	106,930	66,765	44,623	74,914	1,134	850,662	90.23%	
Registered electors		233,787	40,340	221,802	123,889	117,030	71,973	50,542	81,895	1,525	942,783		
Turnout		88.38%	92.07%	91.70%	88.11%	91.37%	92.76%	88.29%	91.48%	74.36%	90.23%		

The following candidates were elected: Björn Anseeuw (N-VA), 13,202 votes; Hendrik Bogaert (CD&V), 48,421 votes; John Crombez (SP.A), 55,678 votes; Jean-Marie Dedecker (N-VA), 40,781 votes; Wouter De Vriendt (Groen), 14,596 votes; Franky Demon (CD&V), 18,221 votes; Melissa Depraetere (SP.A), 12,601 votes; Nathalie Dewulf (VB), 11,593 votes; Yngvild Ingels (N-VA), 13,131 votes; Sander Loones (N-VA), 44,070 votes; Nathalie Muylle (CD&V), 23,067 votes; Kurt Ravyts (VB), 9,567 votes; Dominiek Spinnewyn-Sneppe (VB), 10,654 votes; Vincent Van Quickenborne (Open Vld), 40,292 votes; Kathleen Verhelst (Open Vld), 11,533 votes; and Wouter Vermeersch (VB), 31,127 votes.

Substitutions:

- John Crombez (SP.A) resigned on 17 September 2020 and was substituted by Vicky Reynaert (SP.A) on the same day.

==== 2014 ====
Results of the 2014 federal election held on 25 May 2014:

Party		Votes per arrondissement									Total Votes	%	Seats
Party		Bruges	Diks- muide	Kortrijk	Ostend	Roese- lare	Tielt	Veurne	Ypres	Expat- riates	Total Votes	%	Seats
New Flemish Alliance	N-VA	58,294	9,208	52,475	27,743	31,902	19,057	13,679	17,703	204	230,265	28.50%	6
Christian Democratic and Flemish	CD&V	40,957	8,267	45,765	13,848	23,553	18,370	7,174	17,581	154	175,669	21.74%	4
Socialist Party Different	SP.A	34,210	6,420	33,159	23,376	15,767	8,246	8,094	13,036	98	142,406	17.63%	3
Open Flemish Liberals and Democrats	Open Vld	26,542	5,277	26,225	16,087	11,757	7,473	6,867	10,960	200	111,388	13.79%	2
Groen	Groen	18,794	1,739	16,077	8,957	7,178	3,636	2,507	4,589	180	63,657	7.88%	1
Vlaams Belang	VB	8,889	1,632	9,155	5,176	5,323	3,170	1,472	3,363	52	38,232	4.73%	0
Libertair, Direct, Democratisch	LDD	5,491	1,606	5,032	7,213	2,892	1,889	2,199	2,074	18	28,414	3.52%	0
Workers' Party of Belgium	PVDA	3,106	475	3,905	1,755	1,605	890	479	1,167	15	13,397	1.66%	0
ROSSEM		753	155	503	413	365	217	109	294	1	2,810	0.35%	0
Belgische Unie – Union Belge	BUB	465	49	408	262	142	76	118	165	6	1,691	0.21%	0
Valid votes		197,501	34,828	192,704	104,830	100,484	63,024	42,698	70,932	928	807,929	100.00%	16
Rejected votes		9,871	2,395	10,921	5,415	6,103	4,040	2,134	4,870	61	45,810	5.37%	
Total polled		207,372	37,223	203,625	110,245	106,587	67,064	44,832	75,802	989	853,739	91.32%	
Registered electors		230,253	40,124	220,449	123,058	115,742	71,781	49,954	82,254	1,257	934,872		
Turnout		90.06%	92.77%	92.37%	89.59%	92.09%	93.43%	89.75%	92.16%	78.68%	91.32%		

The following candidates were elected: Hendrik Bogaert (CD&V), 58,649 votes; An Capoen (N-VA), 15,636 votes; Koenraad Degroote (N-VA), 17,699 votes; Franky Demon (CD&V), 16,394 votes; Roel Deseyn (CD&V), 20,413 votes; Wouter De Vriendt (Groen), 14,700 votes; Daphné Dumery (N-VA), 21,007 votes; Rita Gantois (N-VA), 14,696 votes; Sabien Lahaye-Battheu (Open Vld), 17,640 votes; Nathalie Muylle (CD&V), 25,767 votes; Alain Top (SP.A), 9,572 votes;Johan Vande Lanotte (SP.A), 68,898 votes; Ann Vanheste (SP.A), 12,149 votes; Vincent Van Quickenborne (Open Vld), 38,896 votes; Jan Vercammen (N-VA), 15,782 votes; and Brecht Vermeulen (N-VA), 37,005 votes.

==== 2010 ====
Results of the 2010 federal election held on 13 June 2010:

Party		Votes per arrondissement									Total Votes	%	Seats
Party		Bruges	Diks- muide	Kortrijk	Ostend	Roese- lare	Tielt	Veurne	Ypres	Expat- riates	Total Votes	%	Seats
New Flemish Alliance	N-VA	48,511	6,469	44,054	23,066	26,354	15,697	10,175	13,844	147	188,317	23.98%	4
Christian Democratic and Flemish	CD&V	39,838	9,697	45,003	14,684	24,670	17,862	7,583	21,252	113	180,702	23.01%	4
Socialist Party Different	SP.A	29,582	4,311	28,703	19,258	13,650	6,510	6,856	9,871	62	118,803	15.13%	3
Open Flemish Liberals and Democrats	Open Vld	26,371	4,977	25,973	14,135	11,102	8,228	6,509	8,848	122	106,265	13.53%	2
Vlaams Belang	VB	16,344	3,056	18,013	9,487	9,403	5,556	2,923	6,370	48	71,200	9.07%	1
List Dedecker	LDD	12,302	3,362	11,760	12,584	6,805	4,249	4,084	5,051	13	60,210	7.67%	1
Groen	Groen	14,197	1,363	12,277	7,424	5,468	2,818	2,457	3,438	91	49,533	6.31%	1
Workers' Party of Belgium	PVDA	1,407	227	2,024	810	725	383	338	574	1	6,489	0.83%	0
Freedom, Intimacy, Home, Work and Love	VITAL	581	88	514	459	236	101	76	202	2	2,259	0.29%	0
Left Socialist Party	LSP	326	55	348	245	142	84	124	118	1	1,443	0.18%	0
Valid votes		189,459	33,605	188,669	102,152	98,555	61,488	41,125	69,568	600	785,221	100.00%	16
Rejected votes		10,511	2,665	12,180	6,200	6,709	4,628	2,380	5,234	14	50,521	6.05%	
Total polled		199,970	36,270	200,849	108,352	105,264	66,116	43,505	74,802	614	835,742	91.23%	
Registered electors		221,838	39,281	217,967	120,886	114,101	70,820	48,868	81,651	695	916,107		
Turnout		90.14%	92.33%	92.15%	89.63%	92.26%	93.36%	89.03%	91.61%	88.35%	91.23%		

The following candidates were elected: Hendrik Bogaert (CD&V), 37,095 votes; Manu Beuselinck (N-VA), 10,466 votes; Geert Bourgeois (N-VA), 45,848 votes; Stefaan De Clerck (CD&V), 43,946 votes; Jean-Marie Dedecker (LDD), 32,514 votes; Koenraad Degroote (N-VA), 11,145 votes; Wouter De Vriendt (Groen), 11,302 votes; Daphné Dumery (N-VA), 13,717 votes; Sabien Lahaye-Battheu (Open Vld), 13,394 votes; Renaat Landuyt (SP.A), 38,216 votes; Yves Leterme (CD&V), 101,830 votes; Peter Logghe (VB), 10,563 votes; Nathalie Muylle (CD&V), 26,116 votes; Ann Vanheste (SP.A), 7,883 votes; Myriam Vanlerberghe (SP.A), 14,195 votes; and Vincent Van Quickenborne (Open Vld), 45,196 votes.

Substitutions:

- Geert Bourgeois (N-VA) was appointed to the federal government and was substituted by Bert Maertens (N-VA) between 20 July 2010 and 6 November 2012.
- Hendrik Bogaert (CD&V) was appointed to the federal government and was substituted by Roel Deseyn (CD&V) between 7 December 2011 and 14 December 2011; by Bercy Slegers between 15 December 2011 and 8 October 2013; and by Gerda Mylle (CD&V) from 8 October 2013.
- Yves Leterme (CD&V) resigned on 14 December 2011 and was substituted by Roel Deseyn (CD&V) on 15 December 2011.
- Manu Beuselinck (N-VA) resigned on 6 November 2012 and was substituted by Bert Maertens (N-VA) on 7 November 2012.
- Geert Bourgeois (N-VA) resigned on 8 November 2012 after he was appointed to the government of Flemish Minister-President Kris Peeters and was substituted by Cathy Coudyser (N-VA).
- Myriam Vanlerberghe (SP.A) resigned on 1 December 2012 and was substituted by Rosaline Mouton (SP.A) on 6 December 2012.
- Stefaan De Clerck (CD&V) resigned on 8 October 2013 and was substituted by Bercy Slegers (CD&V) on the same day.

==== 2007 ====
Results of the 2007 federal election held on 10 June 2007:

Party		Votes per arrondissement									Total Votes	%	Seats
Party		Bruges	Diks- muide	Kortrijk	Ostend	Roese- lare	Tielt	Veurne	Ypres	Expat- riates	Total Votes	%	Seats
Christian Democratic and Flemish and New Flemish Alliance	CD&V-N-VA	62,374	12,103	69,923	20,674	40,780	28,293	12,183	28,320	238	274,888	34.20%	6
Open Flemish Liberals and Democrats	Open Vld	34,417	5,908	31,587	19,080	13,291	9,433	8,775	10,578	169	133,238	16.58%	3
Socialist Party Different and Spirit	SP.A-Spirit	33,645	5,214	30,342	24,544	14,306	6,168	6,406	11,065	74	131,764	16.39%	2
Vlaams Belang	VB	29,010	4,389	29,036	15,548	14,845	8,563	4,972	9,503	116	115,982	14.43%	2
List Dedecker	LDD	21,008	4,537	18,346	15,741	10,610	6,687	6,362	7,081	31	90,403	11.25%	2
Groen	Groen	13,918	1,294	11,231	6,382	5,437	2,812	2,087	3,502	100	46,763	5.82%	1
Workers' Party of Belgium	PVDA	1,040	157	1,415	499	535	332	243	395	5	4,621	0.57%	0
Committee for Another Policy	CAP	549	114	751	262	284	161	100	173	0	2,394	0.30%	0
Belgische Unie – Union Belge	BUB	660	40	338	353	103	66	174	193	8	1,935	0.24%	0
Freedom, Intimacy, Home, Work and Love	VITAL	473	48	433	303	170	99	79	175	0	1,780	0.22%	0
Valid votes		197,094	33,804	193,402	103,386	100,361	62,614	41,381	70,985	741	803,768	100.00%	16
Rejected votes		8,778	2,467	10,265	5,430	5,684	3,879	2,159	4,705	28	43,395	5.12%	
Total polled		205,872	36,271	203,667	108,816	106,045	66,493	43,540	75,690	769	847,163	93.05%	
Registered electors		224,767	38,486	216,521	118,808	112,864	70,210	47,640	80,288	898	910,482		
Turnout		91.59%	94.24%	94.06%	91.59%	93.96%	94.71%	91.39%	94.27%	85.63%	93.05%		

The following candidates were elected: Hendrik Bogaert (CD&V-N-VA), 87,658 votes; Agnes Bruyninckx-Vandenhoudt (VB), 8,387 votes; Koen Bultinck (VB), 19,344 votes; Stefaan De Clerck (CD&V-N-VA), 54,243 votes; Jean-Marie Dedecker (LDD), 51,120 votes; Els De Rammelaere (CD&V-N-VA), 21,324 votes; Roel Deseyn (CD&V-N-VA), 30,309 votes; Wouter De Vriendt (Groen), 8,233 votes; Dalila Douifi (SP.A-Spirit), 13,559 votes; Luc Goutry (CD&V-N-VA), 39,684 votes; Sabien Lahaye-Battheu (Open Vld), 13,908 votes; Renaat Landuyt (SP.A-Spirit), 38,216 votes; Nathalie Muylle (CD&V-N-VA), 35,067 votes; Bart Tommelein (Open Vld), 13,220 votes; Vincent Van Quickenborne (Open Vld), 54,968 votes; and Ulla Werbrouck (LDD), 11,745 votes.

Substitutions:

- Agnes Bruyninckx-Vandenhoudt (VB) resigned on 19 June 2007 and was substituted by Peter Logghe (VB).
- Vincent Van Quickenborne (Open Vld) was appointed to the federal government and was substituted by Sofie Staelraeve (Open Vld) between 20 March 2008 and 1 July 2009.
- Stefaan De Clerck (CD&V-N-VA) was appointed to the federal government and was substituted by Patrick De Groote (CD&V-N-VA) on 30 December 2008.
- Bart Tommelein (Open Vld) resigned on 30 June 2009 and was substituted by Sofie Staelraeve (Open Vld) on 2 July 2009.
- Ulla Werbrouck (LDD) resigned on 30 June 2009 and was substituted by Paul Vanhie (LDD) on 2 July 2009.
- Vincent Van Quickenborne (Open Vld) was appointed to the federal government and was substituted by Roland Defreyne (Open Vld) on 2 July 2009.

==== 2003 ====
Results of the 2003 federal election held on 18 May 2003:

Party		Votes per arrondissement									Total Votes	%	Seats
Party		Bruges	Diks- muide	Kortrijk	Ostend	Roese- lare	Tielt	Veurne	Ypres	Expat- riates	Total Votes	%	Seats
Christian Democratic and Flemish	CD&V	45,930	9,916	57,681	16,173	29,072	23,632	8,357	21,940	231	212,932	26.84%	5
Socialist Party Different and Spirit	SP.A-Spirit	49,304	8,476	46,286	33,467	22,584	10,412	9,221	17,827	92	197,669	24.91%	4
Flemish Liberals and Democrats	VLD	46,137	7,025	38,955	23,815	18,274	12,341	11,524	14,022	214	172,307	21.72%	4
Vlaams Blok	VB	28,167	4,412	27,513	16,068	12,756	8,166	5,328	9,238	147	111,795	14.09%	2
New Flemish Alliance	N-VA	11,807	1,879	13,531	5,290	11,680	4,526	2,796	3,743	40	55,292	6.97%	1
Agalev	Agalev	8,623	665	6,067	2,825	2,832	1,393	1,144	1,980	48	25,577	3.22%	0
Vivant	Vivant	1,965	161	1,405	1,104	701	515	429	503	12	6,795	0.86%	0
Liberal Appeal	LA	884	156	575	674	378	176	446	319	15	3,623	0.46%	0
Safe Blue		642	66	340	799	146	96	139	139	8	2,375	0.30%	0
Workers' Party of Belgium	PVDA	492	68	661	240	176	174	118	177	4	2,110	0.27%	0
OMNIUM		407	42	599	177	133	78	59	118	3	1,616	0.20%	0
Freedom, Intimacy, Home, Work and Love	VITAL	329	48	319	223	142	78	63	120	3	1,325	0.17%	0
Valid votes		194,687	32,914	193,932	100,855	98,874	61,587	39,624	70,126	817	793,416	100.00%	16
Rejected votes		10,056	2,576	11,211	5,964	6,321	4,177	2,123	5,103	74	47,605	5.66%	
Total polled		204,743	35,490	205,143	106,819	105,195	65,764	41,747	75,229	891	841,021	93.76%	
Registered electors		221,277	37,540	215,265	115,820	111,205	69,107	45,671	80,160	959	897,004		
Turnout		92.53%	94.54%	95.30%	92.23%	94.60%	95.16%	91.41%	93.85%	92.91%	93.76%		

The following candidates were elected: Geert Bourgeois (N-VA), 30,976 votes; Koen Bultinck (VB), 7,406 votes; Stefaan De Clerck (CD&V), 98,671 votes; Philippe De Coene (SP.A-Spirit), 15,750 votes; Roel Deseyn (CD&V), 19,918 votes; Dalila Douifi (SP.A-Spirit), 17,009 votes; Luc Goutry (CD&V), 28,381 votes; Sabien Lahaye-Battheu (VLD), 15,419 votes; Renaat Landuyt (SP.A-Spirit), 43,985 votes; Pierre Lano (VLD), 17,294 votes; Yves Leterme (CD&V), 70,254 votes; Trees Pieters (CD&V), 23,556 votes; Bart Tommelein (VLD), 10,572 votes; Johan Vande Lanotte (SP.A-Spirit), 89,950 votes; Frank Vanhecke (VB), 36,150 votes; and Marc Verwilghen (VLD), 59,220 votes.

Substitutions:

- Frank Vanhecke (VB) was elected to the Senate and was substituted by Frieda Van Themsche (VB) on 21 May 2003.
- Stefaan De Clerck (CD&V) was elected to the Senate and was substituted by Hendrik Bogaert (CD&V) on 21 May 2003.
- Renaat Landuyt (SP.A-Spirit) resigned on 4 June 2003 after he was appointed to the government of Flemish Minister-President Bart Somers and was substituted by Geert Lambert (SP.A-Spirit).
- Johan Vande Lanotte (SP.A-Spirit) was appointed to the federal government and was substituted by Patrick Lansens (SP.A-Spirit) between 14 July 2003 and 16 October 2005.
- Marc Verwilghen (VLD) was appointed to the federal government and was substituted by Vincent Van Quickenborne (VLD) between 14 July 2003 and 29 July 2004; Miguel Chevalier (SP.A-Spirit) from 30 July 2004.
- Yves Leterme (CD&V) resigned on 6 July 2004 and was substituted by Nathalie Muylle (CD&V) on 8 July 2004.
- Geert Bourgeois (N-VA) resigned on 22 July 2004 and was substituted by Patrick De Groote (N-VA) on 30 July 2004.
