= Melissa Depraetere =

Belgian politician (born 1992)

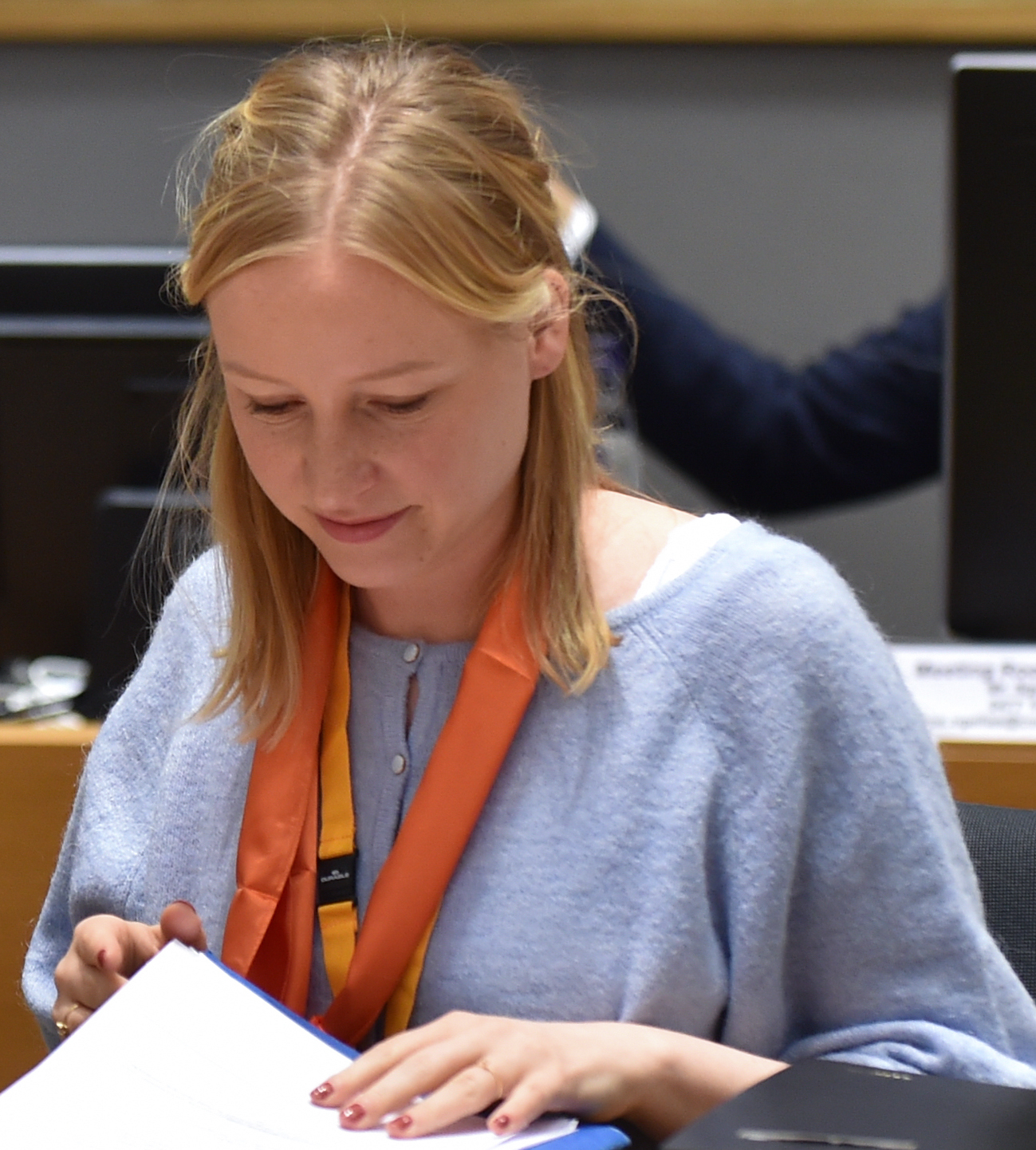
- Depraetere in 2024

Vice Minister-President of Flanders
- Incumbent
- Assumed office 30 September 2024 Serving with Ben Weyts and Hilde Crevits
- Prime Minister: Matthias Diependaele

Leader of Vooruit
- In office 17 November 2023 – 18 July 2024
- Preceded by: Conner Rousseau
- Succeeded by: Conner Rousseau

Member of the Chamber of Representatives of Belgium
- Incumbent
- Assumed office 20 June 2019
- Constituency: West Flanders

Personal details
- Born: 12 May 1992 (age 33) Kortrijk, West Flanders, Belgium
- Party: Vooruit

Melissa Depraetere (born 12 May 1992 in Kortrijk) is a Belgian politician and leader of Vooruit. She has been a Vice Minister-President of Flanders in the Diependaele Government since 2024, additionally serving as the Flemish Minister for Housing, Energy and Climate, Tourism, and Youth.

She has been a member of the Chamber of Representatives for West Flanders since 2019.

Before being elected, she was a parliamentary assistant to Alain Top, and a OCMW councillor in Harelbeke. Depraetere was also active in Chiro Flanders, a Belgian youth organisation.

In November 2018, it was announced that Depraetere would be in second place on the sp.a list for the 2019 election, behind then-party leader John Crombez. She won 12,601 votes and gained a seat in the Chamber of Representatives.

She is a member of the Committee for the Economy, Consumer Protection and the Digital Agenda, the COVID-19 Committee, and the Committee for Electoral Expenses.

== See also ==
- List of members of the Chamber of Representatives of Belgium, 2019–2024
- List of members of the Chamber of Representatives of Belgium, 2024–
