= Conner Rousseau =

Belgian politician (born 1992)

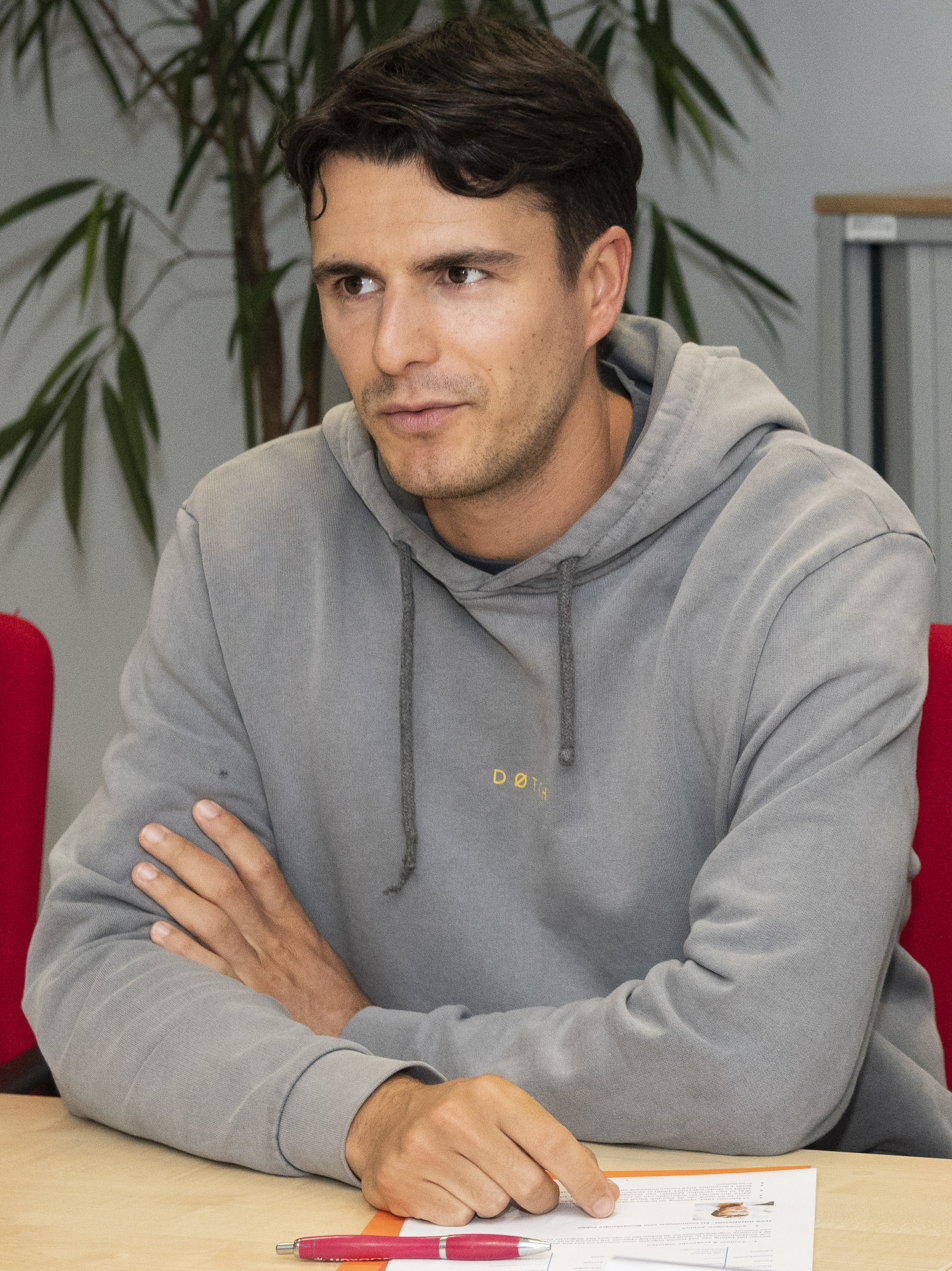
- Rousseau in 2023

Leader of Vooruit
- Incumbent
- Assumed office 18 July 2024
- Preceded by: Melissa Depraetere
- In office 8 November 2019 – 17 November 2023
- Preceded by: John Crombez
- Succeeded by: Melissa Depraetere

Member of the Flemish Parliament
- Incumbent
- Assumed office 18 June 2019

Personal details
- Born: 13 November 1992 (age 33) Sint-Niklaas, Belgium
- Citizenship: Belgian
- Party: Vooruit
- Education: Ghent University
- Occupation: Politician

Conner Rousseau (born 13 November 1992) is a Belgian politician and chairman of the social-democratic Flemish Vooruit party (formerly known as the sp.a). He became its chairman in November 2019 at the age of 26.

== Biography ==
Rousseau was born in Sint-Niklaas and is the son of former sp.a politician and university professor Christel Geerts who was the mayor of Sint-Niklaas and John Rousseau, a former basketball player. He studied law at Ghent University and then worked as an advisor to Flemish minister Freya Van den Bossche and then sp.a chairman John Crombez.

During the 2019 Belgian regional elections, Rousseau was elected to the Flemish Parliament on the East Flanders list. After his election, he announced his intention to run for leadership of the sp.a and succeeded Crombez in this role. In 2020, he announced his intention to change the name of the party from Socialistische Partij Anders (Socialist Party Differently) to Vooruit meaning "Forward". The motion was approved by party members and came into effect in 2021.

Rousseau caused some controversy when he was videoed dancing at a wedding party in July 2020, in Fréjus, France, without wearing a mask during the COVID-19 lockdown. Further controversy ensued in December 2022, when in an April 2022 interview he told HUMO, "I don't feel at home in Molenbeek." He added that "my message was that we need to improve the conditions in these neighbourhoods by investing in language, childcare and education."

In September 2023 Rousseau caused controversy about racist remarks he made about the Roma community while in discussion with police inspectors in Sint Niklaas. The police filed a report for racism and xenophobia. Later, he filed a petition in court for a publication ban regarding this matter. He resigned as leader of Vooruit on 17 November.

After his resignation as a member of parliament, Rousseau founded his one-man company The Extra Mile, through which he provided strategic advice and communication advice to companies, mainly in the Netherlands.

Rousseau was announced in November 2023 as the party leader in the East Flanders constituency in the Flemish elections. A provincial congress of the party in East Flanders was supposed to ratify this choice in January 2024, but in the end Rousseau decided to pass up the position of party leader, because he did not feel ready to play a prominent role in the campaign after the fuss surrounding his person. The party then offered him the place of list pusher on the Flemish list in the constituency of East Flanders, which Rousseau publicly accepted on 10 April. He declared that he would quit politics if he was not elected. In the 2024 Belgian federal election in June, he received the highest number of preference votes in East Flanders with 75,801 votes and was therefore elected. Rousseau then took his seat in the Flemish Parliament again.

After the elections, Melissa Depraetere decided not to stand as a candidate in the new presidential elections that were called at Vooruit, after which Rousseau applied to be re-elected as party chairman. After the closing of the candidatures, it turned out that Rousseau was the only candidate for the position. He was re-elected as president on 18 July 2024 with 94% of the votes.

In the 2024 Belgian local elections in October, Rousseau was the party leader for Vooruit in the city of Sint-Niklaas and thus a candidate for mayor. The socialists made solid progress and saw their number of seats more than double (from 5 to 12 seats), but the N-VA of outgoing mayor Lieven Dehandschutter remained the largest party in the city, so Rousseau could not claim the mayorship. A college of aldermen was then formed consisting of N-VA, Vooruit and CD&V. Rousseau did not join the college of mayor and aldermen, although he did take a seat in the city council.
