= Jeroen Soete =

Belgian politician (born 1983)

Member of the Chamber of Representatives
- Incumbent
- Assumed office 9 June 2024
- Constituency: West Flanders

Personal details
- Born: 26 December 1983 (age 42) Ostend, Belgium
- Party: Vooruit

Jeroen B. Soete (born 26 December 1983) is a Belgian politician and member of the Chamber of Representatives. A member of Vooruit, he has represented West Flanders since June 2024.

Soete was born on 26 December 1983 in Ostend. He worked for Flemish Secretary of state John Crombez and was later a parliamentary worker for Crombez. He was then chief of staff for Flemish MP Jurgen Vanlerberghe.

Soete was a member of the Socialist Party Different (SP.A)'s youth wing in Ostend. He was later chairman of the SP.A's local branch in West Flanders. He was appointed to the Public Centre for Social Welfare (OCMW) in January 2015. He contested the 2012 local election as the SP.A's 18th placed candidate in Ostend but was not elected. He was appointed to the municipal council in Ostend in September 2015 following the resignation of Franky De Block. He contested the 2018 local election as the Stadslijst's 10th placed candidate in Ostend but was not elected. He was elected to the Chamber of Representatives at the 2024 federal election.

Electoral history of Jeroen Soete
Election	Constituency	Party	Votes	Result
2012 local	Ostend	Socialist Party Different	461	Not elected
2018 local	Ostend	Stadslijst	589	Not elected
2024 federal	West Flanders	Vooruit	7,454	Elected
