= Annick Lambrecht =

Belgian politician (born 1969)

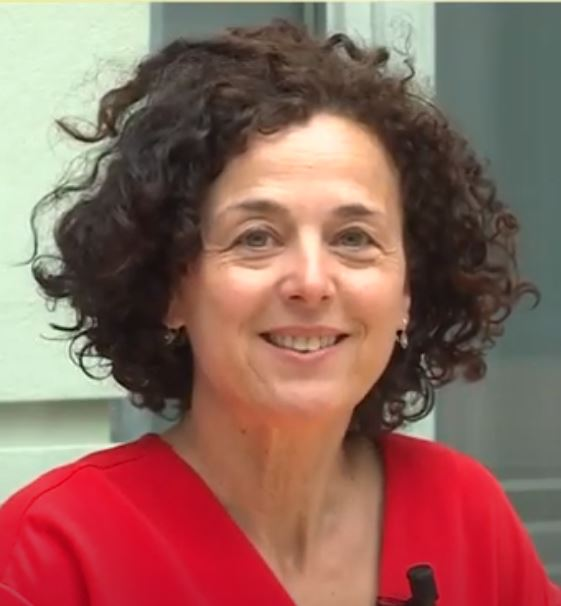
- Lambrecht in July 2019

Member of the Chamber of Representatives
- Incumbent
- Assumed office 9 June 2024
- Constituency: West Flanders
- In office 12 January 2017 – 23 May 2019
- Preceded by: Johan Vande Lanotte
- Constituency: West Flanders

Member of the Senate
- In office 4 July 2019 – 27 May 2024

Member of the Flemish Parliament
- In office 18 June 2019 – 8 June 2024
- Constituency: West Flanders

Personal details
- Born: 9 December 1969 (age 56) Sint-Amandsberg, Belgium
- Party: Vooruit
- Education: Sint-Aloysius School of Economics

Annick Lambrecht (born 9 December 1969) is a Belgian politician and member of the Chamber of Representatives. A member of Vooruit, she has represented West Flanders since June 2024. She had previously been a member of the Chamber of Representatives from January 2017 to May 2019. She was a member of the Senate from July 2019 to May 2024 and a member of the Flemish Parliament from June 2019 to June 2024.

Lambrecht was born on 9 December 1969 in Sint-Amandsberg. She has a degree in commercial sciences from the Sint-Aloysius School of Economics (EHSAL). She was a lecturer at the Hogeschool West-Vlaanderen for ten years.

Lambrecht was elected to the municipal council in Bruges at the 2006 local election. She became schepen (alderman) for personnel, mobility and sports from 2007 to 2017. She was re-elected at the 2012 and 2018 local elections. She was elected to the provincial council in West Flanders at the 2012 local elections.

Lambrecht contested the 2007 federal election as the Socialist Party Different (SP.A)'s 14th placed candidate in West Flanders but was not elected. She contested the 2014 federal election as the SP.A's first placed substitute candidate in West Flanders and received 8,728 preference votes. She was appointed to the Chamber of Representatives in January 2017 following the resignation of Johan Vande Lanotte. She was elected to the Flemish Parliament at the 2019 regional election. She was elected to the Senate by the Flemish Parliament in July 2019. She was elected to the Chamber of Representatives at the 2024 federal election.

Lambrecht is in a relationship with Renaat Landuyt and has two daughters.

Electoral history of Annick Lambrecht
Election	Constituency	Party	Votes	Result
2006 local	Bruges	Socialist Party Different	1,971	Elected
2007 federal	West Flanders	Socialist Party Different	6,249	Not elected
2012 local	Bruges	Socialist Party Different	4,677	Elected
2012 provincial	West Flanders - Bruges	Socialist Party Different	4,924	Elected
2018 local	Bruges	Socialist Party Different	2,942	Elected
2019 regional	West Flanders	Socialist Party Different	22,291	Elected
2024 federal	West Flanders	Vooruit	10,263	Elected
