= Tom Vandenkendelaere =

Belgian politician

Member of the European Parliament
- In office 6 November 2014 – 2019
- Incumbent
- Assumed office 2021

Personal details
- Born: 2 September 1984 (age 41) Roeselare
- Party: Christian Democratic and Flemish (CD&V)
- Website: eutom.eu

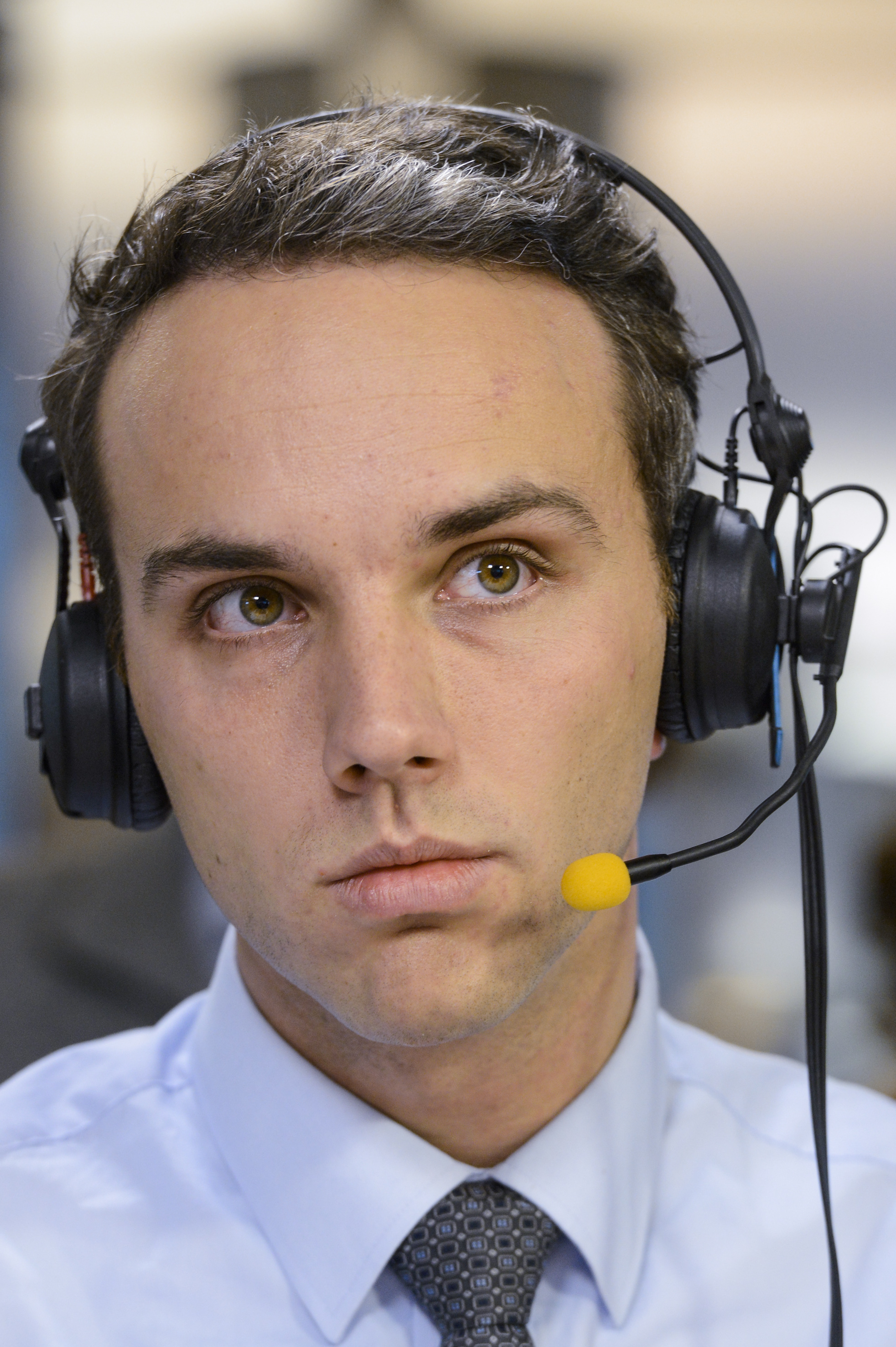
Belgium politician Tom Vandenkendelaere

Tom Vandenkendelaere (born 2 September 1984 in Roeselare) is a Belgian politician who has served as a Member of the European Parliament (MEP) from 2014 until 2019 and again since 2021. He is a member of the Christian Democratic and Flemish party (CD&V), which sits in the EPP Group.

== Political career ==
Vandenkendelaere was chairman of the CD&V youth wing from 2013 to 2014.

In 2014, Vandenkendelaere succeeded Marianne Thyssen, who became European Commissioner. In parliament, he served on the Committee on Economic and Monetary Affairs (ECON), the "Panama Papers" Inquiry Committee (PANA) and the delegation for relations with the People's Republic of China.

Since re-joining the parliament in 2021, Vandenkendelaere has been serving on the Committee on the Internal Market and Consumer Protection, the Committee on Agriculture and Rural Development, the Committee on Foreign Affairs, the Committee on Civil Liberties, Justice and Home Affairs and the Subcommittee on Security and Defence. In addition to his committee assignments, has been a member the parliament's delegation for relations with Iran and chairing the delegation to the NATO Parliamentary Assembly.

== Political positions ==
In October 2021, Vandenkendelaere initiated a nonbinding resolution in which a majority of the European Parliament denounced the “illegal arrest” and conviction of Rwandan politician Paul Rusesabagina and urged the EU to ramp up its efforts to secure his release.
