= Kurt Ravyts =

Belgian politician

Member of the Chamber of Representatives
- Incumbent
- Assumed office 2019

Personal details
- Born: 24 April 1968 (age 58) Bruges, Belgium
- Party: Vlaams Belang
- Education: Catholic University of Leuven

Kurt Ravyts (born 24 April 1968) is a Belgian politician and member of the Chamber of Representatives for the Flemish Vlaams Belang party.

Ravyts described himself as coming from a left-wing background and that his father was a Marxist, however as a student he developed an interest in Flemish nationalism and attended meetings of the NSV. He studied religion at the Catholic University of Leuven and worked as a teacher. In 1999, he started working as regional secretary for the then Vlaams Blok and then as an assistant for the Vlaams Belang fraction in the Flemish Parliament Ravyts was elected to parliament during the 2019 Belgian federal election for the West Flanders constituency. He is also a councilor for the West Flanders region.

He ran as a candidate for the Vlaams Belang party in the local elections on October 13, 2024, in the municipality of Zuienkerke.
