= Nathalie Muylle =

Belgian politician (born 1969)

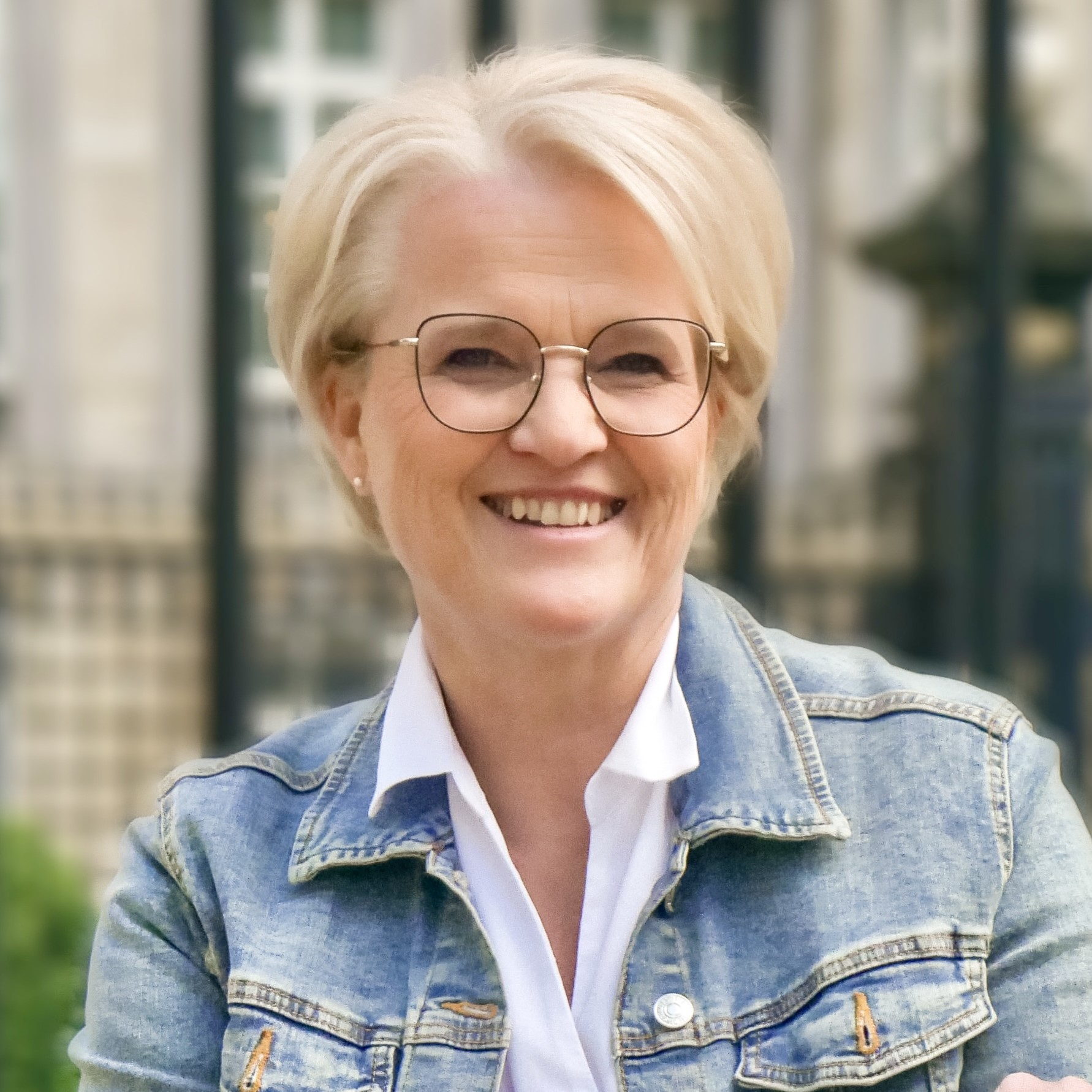
- Muylle in 2023

Minister of Labour, Economy and Consumer Affairs
- In office 3 October 2019 – 1 October 2020
- Prime Minister: Charles Michel; Sophie Wilmès
- Preceded by: Wouter Beke

Member of the Chamber of Representatives
- Incumbent
- Assumed office 8 July 2004
- Preceded by: Yves Leterme
- Constituency: West Flanders

Personal details
- Born: 8 February 1969 (age 57)
- Party: Christian Democratic and Flemish

Nathalie Muylle (born 8 February 1969) is a Belgian politician serving as a member of the Chamber of Representatives since 2004. From 2019 to 2020, she served as minister of labour, economy and consumer affairs.
