= Natalie Eggermont =

Belgian politician (born 1988)

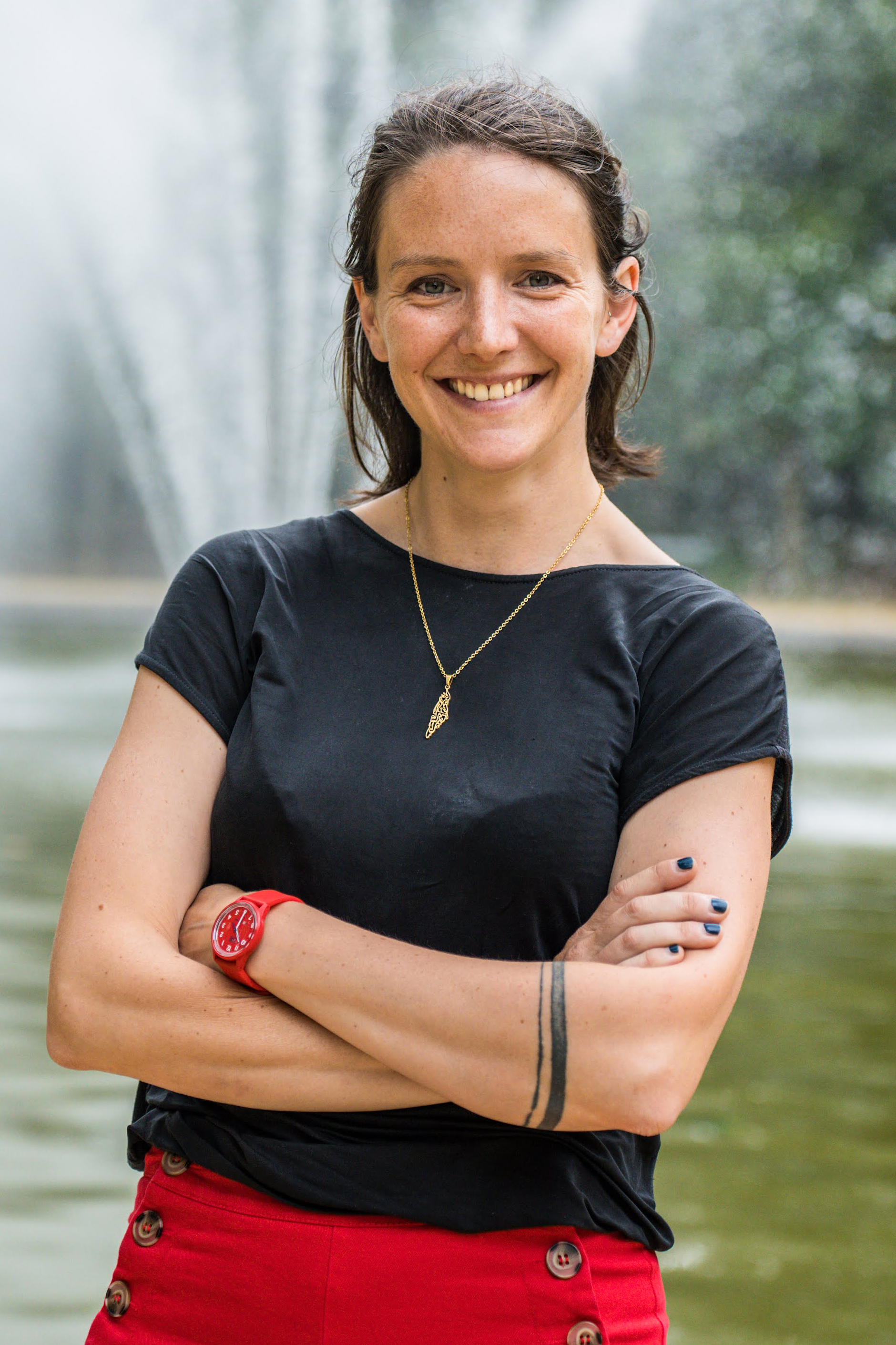
- Eggermont in July 2024

Member of the Chamber of Representatives
- Incumbent
- Assumed office 9 June 2024
- Constituency: West Flanders

Personal details
- Born: 30 September 1988 (age 38) Tremelo, Belgium
- Party: Workers' Party of Belgium
- Education: Ghent University

Natalie Eggermont (born 30 September 1988) is a Belgian physician, politician and member of the Chamber of Representatives. A member of the Workers' Party of Belgium, she has represented West Flanders since June 2024.

Eggermont was born on 30 September 1988 in Tremelo, Leuven. She studied medicine at Ghent University and trained to be an emergency physician at the University Hospital Brussels (AZ-VUB). She later worked as an emergency physician at Delta General Hospital (AZ Delta).

Eggermont became involved in climate activism whilst studying at Ghent University and was chairwoman of Climate Express. She organised the climate train to Warsaw for COP19 in 2013 and performed at the first Ecopolis at COP 21 in 2015. She is the author of Climate Express : Sporen van verandering (2015).

Eggermont contested the 2018 local election as the Workers' Party of Belgium (PVDA)'s fourth placed candidate for the municipal council in Kortrijk but the party failed to win any seats in the municipality. She contested the 2019 regional elections as the PVDA'a first placed candidate for the Flemish Parliament in West Flanders but the party failed to win any seats in the constituency. She was elected to the Chamber of Representatives at the 2024 federal election.

Eggermont has two children and lives in Kortrijk.

Electoral history of Natalie Eggermont
Election	Constituency	Party	Votes	Result
2018 local	Kortrijk	Workers' Party of Belgium	232	Not elected
2019 regional	West Flanders	Workers' Party of Belgium	5,447	Not elected
2024 federal	West Flanders	Workers' Party of Belgium	9,224	Elected
