= An Capoen =

Belgian pathologist and politician

Member of the Belgian Senate
- Incumbent
- Assumed office 9 June 2024

Member of the Chamber of Representatives
- In office 25 May 2014 – 26 May 2019

Personal details
- Born: 20 August 1982 (age 43) Roeselare, Belgium
- Party: N-VA

An Capoen (born 20 September 1982 in Roeselare) is a Belgian pathologist and politician of the New Flemish Alliance party. She currently serves as a co-opted Senator in the Belgian Senate and was a Member of the Chamber of Representatives between 2014 and 2019.

== Biography ==
Capoen is a daughter of former Volksunie senator Michel Capoen. She graduated with a degree in medicine in 2007 and then pathology in 2012 from the Catholic University of Leuven and worked as a pathology specialist at the UZ Leuven from 2007 to 2012, and then at the AZ St-Augustinus hospital in Veurne.

She was elected to the Belgian Chamber of Representatives during the 2014 Belgian federal election for the West Flanders constituency. As a member of parliament, Capoen focused on health care, social security and foreign policy. She lost her seat during the 2019 Belgian federal election to Vlaams Belang. After the 2024 Belgian federal election, she designated by the N-VA to sit in the Senate. She has also been a councilor for the N-VA in Bruges since 2018.
