= 2019 Belgian federal election =

- 26 May 2019
- All 150 seats in the Chamber of Representatives; 76 seats needed for a majority
- Turnout: 88.38% (▼0.99pp)
Party	Leader	Vote %	Seats	+/–
N-VA	Bart De Wever	16.03	25	−8
Vlaams Belang	Tom Van Grieken	11.95	18	+15
PS	Elio Di Rupo	9.46	20	−3
CD&V	Wouter Beke	8.89	12	−6
PVDA-PTB	Peter Mertens	8.62	12	+10
Open Vld	Gwendolyn Rutten	8.54	12	−2
MR	Charles Michel	7.56	14	−6
sp.a	John Crombez	6.71	9	−4
Ecolo	Jean-Marc Nollet & Zakia Khattabi	6.14	13	+7
Groen	Meyrem Almaci	6.10	8	+2
cdH	Maxime Prévot	3.70	5	−4
DéFI	Olivier Maingain	2.22	2	0
This lists parties that won seats. See the complete results below.
Results of the election by constituency
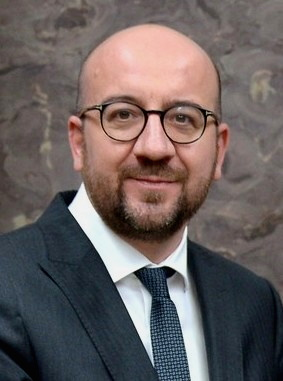

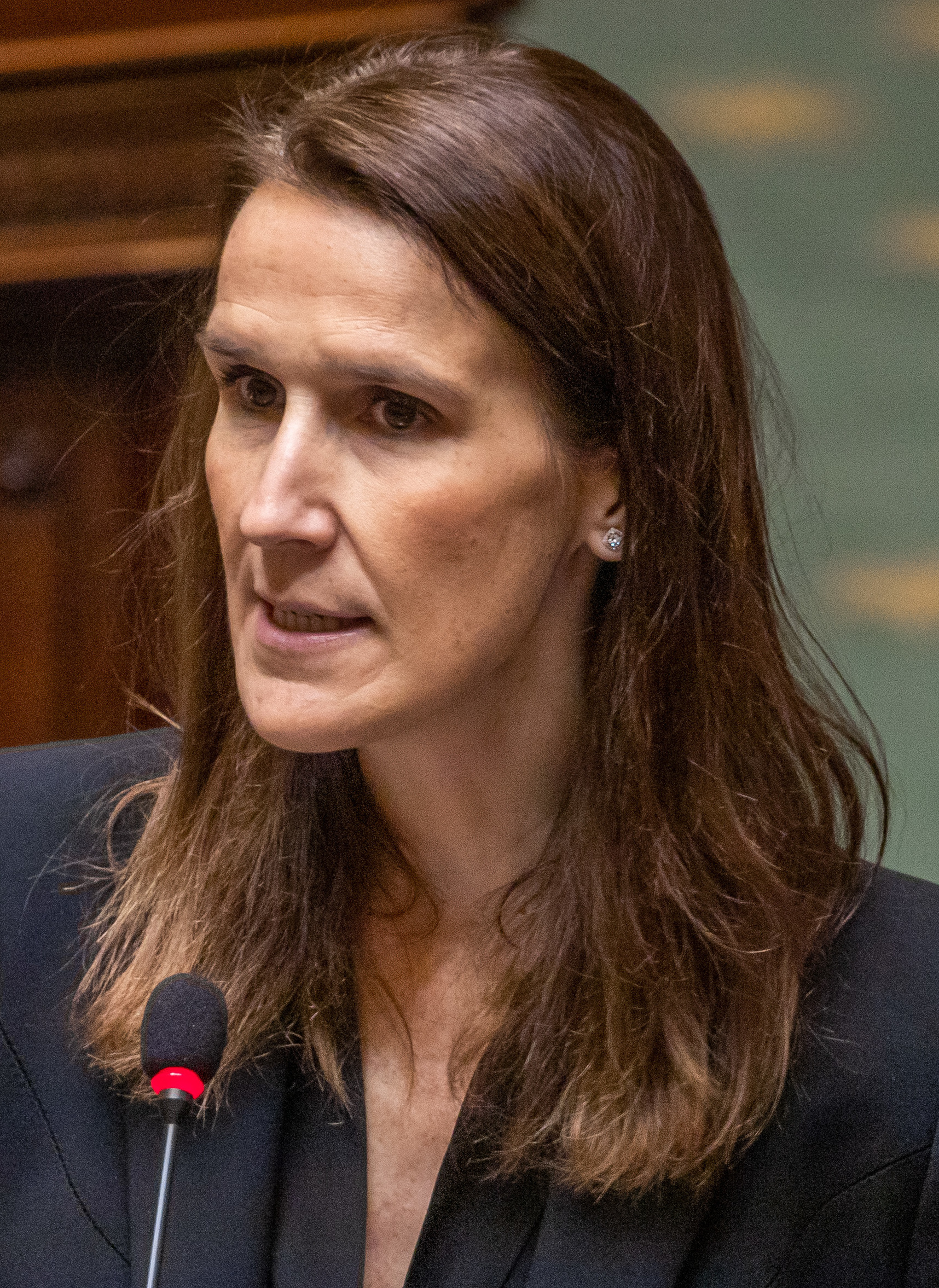
Federal Government before	Federal Government after
Michel II Government	Wilmès II Government

Federal elections were held in Belgium on 26 May 2019, alongside the country's European and regional elections. All 150 members of the Chamber of Representatives were elected from eleven multi-member constituencies.

The far right-wing Vlaams Belang (VB) saw a resurgence in Flanders, and with the New Flemish Alliance (NVA), parties subscribing to Flemish separatism and nationalism obtained nearly 50% of the vote in Flanders. The Belgian coalition of N-VA, CD&V, MR and Open VLD lost more than a quarter of its seats, the worst government punishment in 20 years.

In addition, gains for the far-left Workers' Party of Belgium (PVDA-PTB), and the green Ecolo party in Wallonia occurred. Overall, traditional parties suffered losses in both regions.

== Background ==
Following the 2014 elections, a centre-right government consisting of N-VA, CD&V, Open Vld and MR was formed, led by Prime Minister Charles Michel (MR). This government coalition was unique in several aspects: the N-VA participated for the first time, the MR was the only French-speaking party, and the French-speaking Socialist Party was not part of the government for the first time in 25 years.

Local elections were held on 14 October 2018. As such, the 2019 simultaneous regional, federal and European elections were held only several months after the local elections.

In early December 2018, a political crisis emerged regarding the Global Compact for Migration, which was supposed to be signed but sparked instead opposition from government party N-VA. As the three other government parties as well as a large majority in parliament supported the compact, N-VA left the government and the three other parties continued briefly as a minority cabinet (Michel II) with an unclear status. Prime Minister Michel ultimately offered his resignation to the King on 18 December 2018, who accepted it three days later. As regular elections were scheduled for May 2019 anyway, snap elections were only favoured by N-VA and Vlaams Belang and did not happen, and the minority cabinet continued as a caretaker government until the elections.

== Electoral system ==

The 150 members of the Chamber of Representatives were elected in 11 multi-member constituencies, being the ten provinces and Brussels, with between 4 and 24 seats. Seats are allocated using the D'Hondt method, with an electoral threshold of 5% per constituency.

Representatives elected from the five Flemish Region provinces, Antwerp (24), East Flanders (20), Flemish Brabant (15), Limburg (12) and West Flanders (16), automatically belonged to the Dutch-speaking language group in parliament, whereas those elected from the five provinces of Wallonia, Hainaut (18), Liège (15), Luxembourg (4), Namur (6) and Walloon Brabant (5), formed the French-speaking language group. The 15 members elected in Brussels could choose to join either group. Apportionment of seats is done every ten years in accordance with population data, last by royal order of 31 January 2013.

The 60-member Senate is composed of 50 representatives from the regional and community parliaments, plus 10 co-opted senators proportionally divided among parties based on the result of the federal election.

All Belgian citizens aged 18 or over were obligated to participate in the election. Non-Belgian citizens residing in Belgium (regardless of EU citizenship) could not vote, whereas Belgian citizens living abroad could register to vote.

== Date ==
The 2011–14 state reform changed several aspects regarding federal elections. Starting with the May 2014 election, which coincided with European Parliament and regional elections, the federal parliament is elected for a five-year term rather than a four-year term.

The federal elections would from then on always coincide with the European Parliament elections; snap federal elections would trigger a parliamentary term lasting until the next European Parliament elections. However, as of 2017, a law needed for this to take effect had not yet been enacted. Given the five-year term for all three elections, they all coincided in 2019 regardless, as no snap federal elections were called.

Additionally, de facto practice is to formally dissolve parliament and trigger new elections by Declaration of Revision of the Constitution shortly before regular expiry of the parliamentary term.

== Parties and leaders ==
Name		Ideology	Leader	2014 result	
Name		Ideology	Leader	Votes (%)	Seats
Flemish parties
N-VA	New Flemish Alliance; Nieuw-Vlaamse Alliantie	Flemish nationalism	Bart De Wever	20.3%	33 / 150
CD&V	Christian Democratic and Flemish; Christen-Democratisch en Vlaams	Christian democracy	Wouter Beke	11.6%	18 / 150
Open Vld	Open Flemish Liberals and Democrats; Open Vlaamse Liberalen en Democraten	Liberalism	Gwendolyn Rutten	9.8%	14 / 150
sp.a	Socialist Party Differently; Socialistische Partij Anders	Social democracy	John Crombez	8.8%	13 / 150
Groen	Green; Groen	Green politics	Meyrem Almaci	5.3%	6 / 150
VB	Flemish Interest; Vlaams Belang	Flemish nationalism	Tom Van Grieken	3.7%	3 / 150
Francophone parties
PS	Socialist Party; Parti Socialiste	Social democracy	Elio Di Rupo	11.7%	23 / 150
MR	Reformist Movement; Mouvement Réformateur	Liberalism	Charles Michel	9.6%	20 / 150
cdH	Humanist Democratic Centre; Centre démocrate humaniste	Christian democracy	Maxime Prévot	5.0%	9 / 150
Ecolo	Ecolo; Ecolo	Green politics	Jean-Marc Nollet & Zakia Khattabi	3.3%	6 / 150
DéFI	DéFI; DéFI	Regionalism	Olivier Maingain	1.8%	2 / 150
PP	People's Party; Parti populaire	Right-wing populism	Mischaël Modrikamen	1.5%	1 / 150
Bilingual parties
PVDA–PTB	Workers' Party of Belgium; Partij van de Arbeid van België; Parti du Travail de Belgique	Marxism	Peter Mertens	3.7%	2 / 150

=== Lead candidates ===
The following candidates are the first on the respective party list (lijsttrekker / tête de liste) per constituency.

==== Dutch-speaking constituencies ====
Party	Antwerp	East Flanders	Flemish Brabant	Limburg	West Flanders	Brussels
CD&V	Servais Verherstraeten	Pieter De Crem	Koen Geens	Wouter Beke	Hendrik Bogaert	Sabine de Bethune
Groen	Kristof Calvo	Stefaan Van Hecke	Jessika Soors	Barbara Creemers	Wouter De Vriendt	—N/a
N-VA	Jan Jambon	Anneleen Van Bossuyt	Theo Francken	Zuhal Demir	Sander Loones	Elias Kartout
Open Vld	Christian Leysen	Alexander De Croo	Maggie De Block	Patrick Dewael	Vincent Van Quickenborne	Mimi Crahaij
PVDA	Peter Mertens	Steven De Vuyst	Bea Knaepen	Ayse Yigit	Ilona Vandenberghe	
sp.a	Yasmine Kherbache	Joris Vandenbroucke	Karin Jiroflée	Meryame Kitir	John Crombez	
Vlaams Belang	Tom Van Grieken	Barbara Pas	Dries Van Langenhove	Annick Ponthier	Wouter Vermeersch	

==== French-speaking constituencies ====
Party	Hainaut	Liège	Luxembourg	Namur	Walloon Brabant	Brussels
cdH	Catherine Fonck	Vanessa Matz	René Collin	Maxime Prévot	Olivier Vanham	Joëlle Milquet
DéFI	Alexandra Dupire			Pierre-Yves Dupuis		François De Smet
Ecolo	Jean-Marc Nollet	Sarah Schlitz	Cécile Thibaut	Georges Gilkinet	Simon Moutquin	Zakia Khattabi
MR	Denis Ducarme	Daniel Bacquelaine	Benoit Piedboeuf	David Clarinval	Charles Michel	Didier Reynders
PP						
PS	Elio Di Rupo	Frédéric Daerden			André Flahaut	Ahmed Laaouej
PTB	Marco Van Hees	Raoul Hedebouw		Thierry Warmoes		Maria Vindevoghel

== Campaign ==
Despite leaving the government coalition in late 2018, it was the explicit ambition of N-VA to continue governing after the May 2019 election. In January 2019, the party put forward ex-minister Jan Jambon as candidate for Prime Minister should the party enter a coalition. A continuation of the "Swedish coalition" (Note: Named after blue for the Reform Movement and the Flemish Liberals and Democrats, yellow for the New Flemish Alliance and the cross for Christian Democratic and Flemish) (N-VA, MR, CD&V and Open Vld), potentially expanded with cdH, was a likely scenario. Outgoing Prime Minister Charles Michel (MR) was candidate to continue in his position.

Meanwhile, the French-speaking Socialist Party (PS) had the ambition to re-enter government as well, or "re-conquer" as formulated by leader Elio Di Rupo, after being in the opposition at federal level and being ousted from the Walloon government.

Additionally, there was speculation that the Flemish liberal and green parties (Open Vld and Groen) would favour cooperating, given Groen's recent rise and their local governing coalitions in cities like Mechelen, Gent and Oostende. However, their French-speaking counterparts, MR and Ecolo, are politically and ideologically further apart.

== Retiring incumbents ==
The following incumbent members of the Chamber of Representatives announced their retirement from (national) politics:

- Hans Bonte (sp.a, Flemish Brabant)
- Peter Dedecker (N-VA, East Flanders)
- Alain Mathot (PS, Liège)
- Laurette Onkelinx (PS, Brussels)
- Goedele Uyttersprot (N-VA, East Flanders)
- Dirk Van der Maelen (sp.a, East Flanders)
- Eric Van Rompuy (CD&V, Flemish Brabant)
- Peter Vanvelthoven (sp.a, Limburg)
- Jan Vercammen (N-VA, West Flanders)

== Results ==
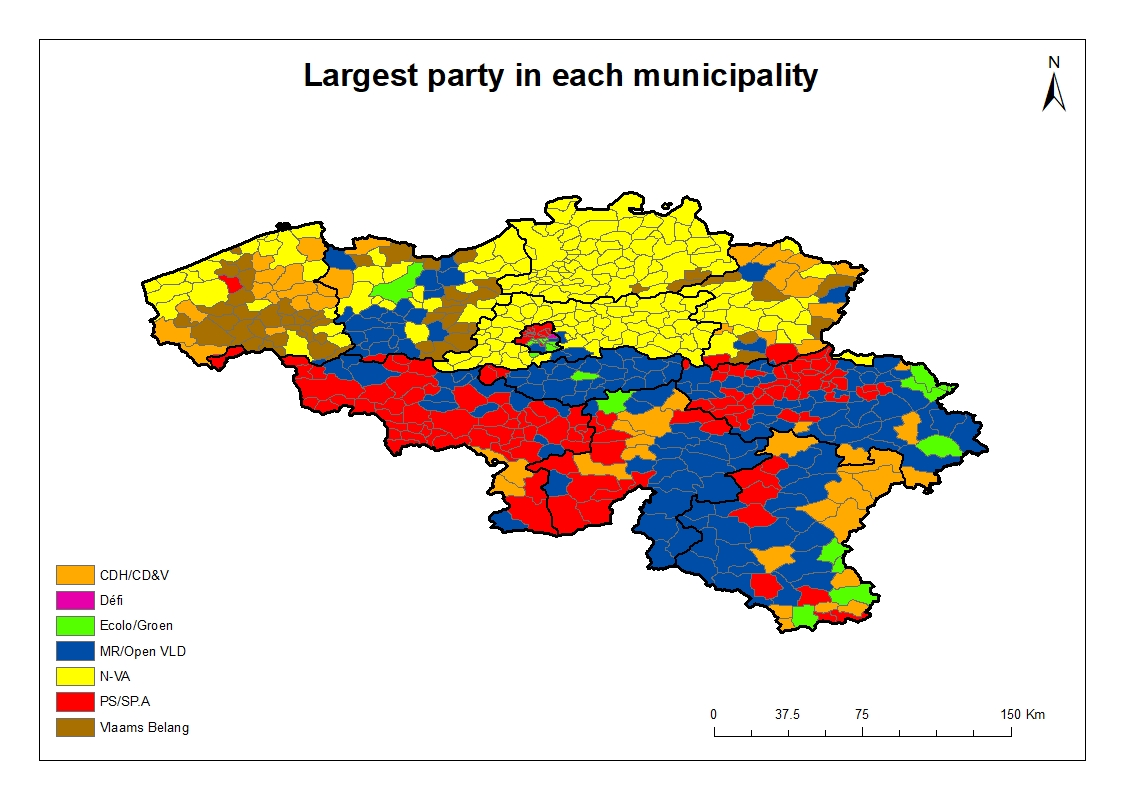
Map of the largest party in each municipality

Party	Votes	%	+/–	Seats	+/–
New Flemish Alliance	1,086,787	16.03	–4.23	25	–8
Vlaams Belang	810,177	11.95	+8.28	18	+15
Socialist Party	641,623	9.46	–2.21	20	–3
Christian Democratic and Flemish	602,520	8.89	–2.72	12	–6
Workers' Party of Belgium	584,621	8.62	+4.90	12	+10
Open Flemish Liberals and Democrats	579,334	8.54	–1.24	12	–2
Reformist Movement	512,825	7.56	–2.08	14	–6
Socialist Party Different	455,034	6.71	–2.12	9	–4
Ecolo	416,452	6.14	+2.84	13	+7
Groen	413,836	6.10	+0.78	8	+2
Humanist Democratic Centre	250,861	3.70	–1.28	5	–4
DéFI	150,394	2.22	+0.42	2	0
People's Party	75,096	1.11	–0.39	0	–1
DierAnimal	47,733	0.70	New	0	New
Destexhe Lists	42,712	0.63	New	0	New
Citizen Collective	21,092	0.31	New	0	New
La Droite	15,075	0.22	–0.16	0	0
Nation	10,583	0.16	0.00	0	0
Les Belges d'Abord	10,463	0.15	New	0	New
Agir	7,598	0.11	New	0	New
Pirate Party	7,521	0.11	–0.23	0	0
Democratic Solidarity Appeal	5,949	0.09	New	0	New
Lutte Ouvrière	5,735	0.08	+0.03	0	0
PRO De Burgerlobby	5,682	0.08	New	0	New
Wallonie Insoumise	5,354	0.08	New	0	New
BUB Belgische Unie	4,513	0.07	New	0	New
Peace and Solidarity Party	3,217	0.05	New	0	New
B.U.B	2,098	0.03	New	0	New
de coöperatie	1,732	0.03	New	0	New
Volt	1,669	0.02	New	0	New
Communist Party of Belgium	1,626	0.02	New	0	New
Turquoise	626	0.01	New	0	New
Total	6,780,538	100.00	–	150	0
Valid votes	6,780,538	93.93			
Invalid/blank votes	438,095	6.07			
Total votes	7,218,633	100.00			
Registered voters/turnout	8,167,709	88.38			
Source: IBZ

=== Results by region ===
==== Flanders ====
Party	Votes	%	Seats	+/–
New Flemish Alliance	1,086,787	25.56	25	−8
Vlaams Belang	810,177	19.05	18	+15
Christian Democratic and Flemish	602,520	14.17	12	−6
Open Flemish Liberals and Democrats	579,334	13.62	12	−2
Socialist Party Different	455,034	10.70	9	−4
Groen	413,836	9.73	8	+2
Workers' Party of Belgium	236,897	5.57	3	+3
Others	67,652	1.59	–	–
Total	4,252,237	100.00	87	–

==== Wallonia ====
Party	Votes	%	Seats	+/–
Socialist Party	641,623	25.38	20	−3
Reformist Movement	512,825	20.28	14	−6
Ecolo	416,452	16.47	13	+7
Workers' Party of Belgium	347,724	13.75	9	+7
Humanist Democratic Centre	250,861	9.92	5	−4
DéFI	150,394	5.95	2	0
People's Party	75,096	2.97	0	−1
Destexhe Lists	42,712	1.69	0	New
Others	90,614	3.58	–	–
Total	2,528,301	100.00	63	–

==== Brussels-Capital ====
Party	Votes	%	Seats	+/–
Ecolo–Groen	108,144	21.57	4	+2
Socialist Party–Socialist Party Different	100,195	19.98	3	−2
Reformist Movement	87,594	17.47	3	−1
Workers' Party of Belgium	61,589	12.28	2	+2
DéFI	51,544	10.28	2	0
Humanist Democratic Centre	29,161	5.82	1	−1
New Flemish Alliance	15,983	3.19	0	0
Destexhe Lists	12,879	2.57	0	New
Open Flemish Liberals and Democrats	11,511	2.30	–	0
People's Party	8,455	1.69	–	0
Vlaams Belang	7,824	1.56	0	0
Christian Democratic and Flemish	6,580	1.31	0	0
Total	501,459	100.00	15	–

=== Senate ===
Since the sixth state reform of 2011, the Senate is no longer directly elected. The regional parliaments elect 50 senators based on the results of the concurrent regional elections (the Flemish Parliament elects 29, the Parliament of the French Community elects ten, the Walloon Parliament elects eight, the Parliament of the Brussels-Capital Region elects two Francophone senators and the Parliament of the German-speaking Community elects one). The elected senators in turn co-opt 10 senators (six Dutch-speaking and four Francophone), making a total of 60 senators.

The distribution of seats among parties resulted as following:

Party	Seats			
Party	Elected	Co-opted	Total	+/–
New Flemish Alliance	8	1	9	–3
Vlaams Belang	6	1	7	+5
Socialist Party	6	1	7	–2
Reformist Movement (Note: Elected members included one German-speaking senator from the Party for Freedom and Progress.)	6	1	7	–1
Workers' Party (Note: The elected members included three Francophone senators and one Dutch-speaking one; the co-opted member was Francophone.)	4	1	5	+5
Christian Democratic and Flemish	4	1	5	–3
Open Flemish Liberals and Democrats	4	1	5	0
Ecolo	4	1	5	+2
Socialist Party Different	3	1	4	–1
Groen	3	1	4	+1
Humanist Democratic Centre	2	0	2	–2
Total	50	10	60	0

== Aftermath ==
The election once again exposed the deep linguistic, ethnic and regional divisions of Belgium, with the Dutch-speaking region of Flanders strongly voting for right-wing Flemish nationalist and separatist parties, and the French-speaking region of Wallonia strongly voting left.

In response to Vlaams Belang's surge in support there was speculation that the N-VA leader Bart De Wever could break the Cordon sanitaire imposed on the party, resulting in the two Flemish nationalist parties joining forces, by refusing to rule out talks with the VB, as their strong results could have made forming a coalition more difficult.

The People's Party, a small right-wing French-speaking party, dissolved on 18 June through an internal party vote in response to losing their only seat in the elections. Former party leader Mischaël Modrikamen blamed the "systematic exclusion of the People's Party from the political and media debate."

In the days following the election, King Philippe held consultations with all main party leaders, including Vlaams Belang party leader Tom Van Grieken. According to The Guardian, it was the first time a Belgian monarch had met a representative from a far-right party since 1936, when King Leopold III met the representatives of the Rexist Party.

On 30 May, King Philippe appointed Johan Vande Lanotte (sp.a) and Didier Reynders (MR), two experienced politicians with a long period of service, as informateurs. They reported on their progress by 6 June as expected, after which they were given some more time, with a new deadline of 17 June. After this deadline passed, another extension was granted until 1 July, and again until 29 July and one more extension until 9 September.

On 24 August the Belgian government decided to appoint Didier Reynders as European Commissioner. On 4 October 2019, King Philippe announced the end of the first phase of federal government formation talks, with the informateurs advising that a government of the N-VA, the Socialist Party and the Greens was the best option to pursue. The informateurs would report back to the king of the 4 November, following which a formateur will be appointed to introduce the third stage of government formation.

On 4 November, the two new informateurs, Rudy Demotte and Geert Bourgeois, offered their resignations to the King, as they could not break the political deadlock.

On 17 March 2020, the successor of Michel II Government, the Wilmès Government, had its mandate extended. Most parliamentary parties provided them external support in order to manage the coronavirus pandemic. Informal talks on forming a new government began in June 2020. Wilmès II government was eventually replaced by the permanent seven-party coalition — De Croo Government in October, with Wilmès becoming one of the deputy prime ministers.

== See also ==
- 2019 Belgian regional elections
