= Franky Demon =

Belgian politician (born 1976)

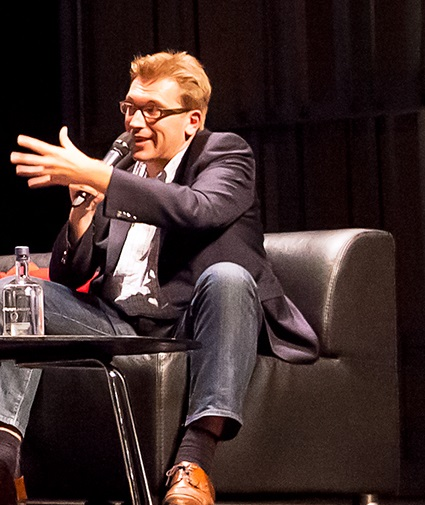
- Demon in 2014

Member of the Chamber of Representatives
- Incumbent
- Assumed office 19 June 2014
- Constituency: West Flanders

Personal details
- Born: 28 June 1976 (age 49)
- Party: Christian Democratic and Flemish

Franky Demon (born 28 June 1976) is a Belgian politician serving as a member of the Chamber of Representatives. A member of Christian Democratic and Flemish, he was first elected in 2014. He is concurrently a schepen of Bruges.
