= Dominiek Spinnewyn-Sneppe =

Belgian-Flemish politician

Member of the Chamber of Representatives
- Incumbent
- Assumed office 26 May 2019

Personal details
- Born: Dominiek Sneppe; 12 September 1973 (age 51); Bruges, Belgium
- Political party: Vlaams Belang

Dominiek Spinnewyn-Sneppe (born 12 September 1973) is a Belgian-Flemish politician who has served as an MP in the Chamber of Representatives for the Vlaams Belang party since May 2019.

Spinnewyn-Sneppe was born in Bruges, Belgium. Her family has been active in politics, her father-in-law Roger Spinnewyn was an early member of the Order of Flemish Militants (VMO) while her brother-in-law John Spinnewyn was a member of the Chamber of Representatives for the former Vlaams Blok party.

Spinnewyn-Sneppe worked as a teacher before becoming involved in politics. She has been a municipal councilor of Zedelgem since January 2007 for the Vlaams Belang and was a provincial councilor of West Flanders from 2018 to 2019. In the federal elections of May 2019, she was placed second on the VB's list for the West Flanders constituency and was elected to the Chamber of Representatives.

Shortly after her election to parliament, Spinnewyn-Sneppe caused controversy by making critical statements of same-sex marriage, LGBT rights and adoption by gay couples in a radio interview that were perceived as homophobic. Her opinions were condemned by VB leader Tom Van Grieken, who stated they did not reflect party policy, and other Flemish parties including the New Flemish Alliance. Spinnewyn-Sneppe subsequently expressed regret for the way in which she had phrased her remarks.
