= Nathalie Dewulf =

Belgian politician

Nathalie Dewulf (born 3 February 1974, Izegem) is a Belgian politician who has been an MP in the Chamber of Representatives for the Flemish nationalist Vlaams Belang party since 2019.

Dewulf first joined the Vlaams Belang in 2012 and became a councilor for the party in her hometown of Izegem in 2018. In 2019, she was elected to the Chamber of Representatives after being placed second on the list for the West Flanders constituency. Following her election, she was investigated by her party after an old Facebook post surfaced of her making a joke in which she favourably compared the movie character E.T. to Moroccan immigrants by posting “He came alone, he already had a bicycle, he learned our language and he wanted to go back home." Dewulf subsequently issued a public apology. In parliament, Dewulf tabled a motion which would allow heavily pregnant women to use disabled parking spaces.
