= Charlotte Verkeyn =

Belgian politician

- Incumbent
- Assumed office 9 June 2024

Member of the Chamber of Representatives

Personal details
- Born: Charlotte Fabienne Verkeyn; 6 January 1989 (age 37) Ostend, Belgium
- Party: New Flemish Alliance
- Education: University of Ghent

Charlotte Fabienne Verkeyn (born 6 January 1989 in Ostend) is a Belgian lawyer and politician of the New Flemish Alliance party. She has served as a Member of the Chamber of Representatives since 2024 for the West Flanders constituency.

== Biography ==
Verkeyn obtained a master's degree in law from the University of Ghent and has practiced as a professional lawyer in Ghent and Ostend since 2012.

In October 2012, she was elected as a municipal councilor in Ostend for the N-VA. Since 2019, she has been an alderman for the city focusing on matters related to transport. In the 2024 Belgian federal election, she was elected to the Chamber of Representatives for West Flanders.

Outside of politics, she is married to Belgian tennis player Niels Desein with whom she has a son. They live in Wondelgem.
