= Kristien Verbelen =

Belgian politician

Member of the Chamber of Representatives
- Incumbent
- Assumed office 2024

Personal details
- Born: Kristien Verbelen; 19 February 1982 (age 44) Eeklo, Belgium
- Party: Vlaams Belang
- Education: University of Ghent

Kristien Verbelen (born 19 February 1982 in Eeklo) is a Belgian politician of the Vlaams Belang party who was elected to the Belgian Chamber of Representatives in 2024.

== Biography ==
Verbelen studied business at the University of Ghent where she was active in the Nationalistische Studentenvereniging (NSV) organization and served as its president from 2005 to 2006. After graduating, she worked as a logistics manager for a cargo company and later as an international sales executive for a concrete manufacturer.

She became a member of Vlaams Belang through her time in the NSV and was chairwoman of the VB local branch in Oostkamp. For the 2024 Belgian federal election Verbelen was elected to the Chamber of Representatives for the West Flanders constituency. She serves on the defense committee in parliament.
