= Wouter Beke =

Belgian politician (born 1974)

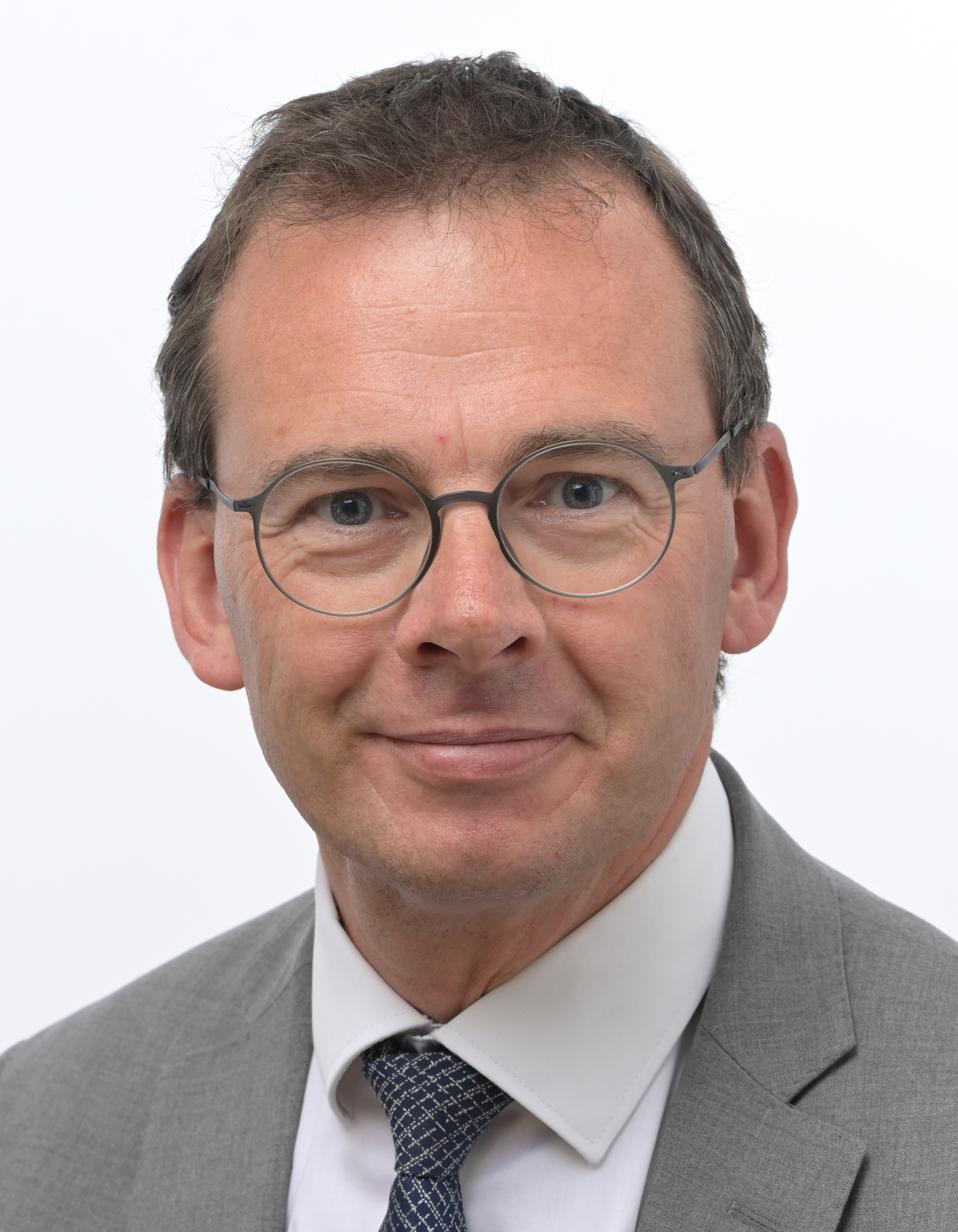
- Official portrait, 2024

Flemish Minister for Welfare, Public health, Family and Poverty reduction
- In office 2 October 2019 – 16 May 2022
- Preceded by: Jo Vandeurzen
- Succeeded by: Hilde Crevits

Leader of Christian Democratic and Flemish
- In office 23 June 2010 – 8 October 2019
- Preceded by: Marianne Thyssen
- Succeeded by: Joachim Coens
- In office 20 March 2008 – 15 May 2008
- Preceded by: Etienne Schouppe
- Succeeded by: Marianne Thyssen

Federal Minister for Work, Economy and Consumer Affairs
- In office 2 July 2019 – 2 October 2019
- Preceded by: Kris Peeters
- Succeeded by: Nathalie Muylle

Personal details
- Born: 9 August 1974 (age 52) Lommel, Belgium
- Party: CD&V
- Spouse: Leen Desmyter
- Children: 3
- Education: Vrije Universiteit Brussel; Catholic University of Leuven
- Website: Official website

Wouter Beke (born 9 August 1974) is a Belgian politician and a member of the CD&V. He was reelected as a member of the Belgian Senate in 2007. In 2014 he became a member of the Belgian Federal House of Representatives and was reelected in 2019. In July 2019 he succeeded Kris Peeters as Federal Minister for Work, Economy and Consumer affairs. He left the Belgian Federal Government in October 2019 to become Minister for Welfare, Public health, Family and Poverty reduction in the Flemish Regional Jambon Government.

Wouter Beke studied Social Law at the Vrije Universiteit Brussel and Political Sciences at the Katholieke Universiteit Leuven. He is a doctor in the Social Sciences.

While working as a researcher at the Leuven University, he entered politics in his municipality Leopoldsburg. He became a senator in 2004. Between 21 March 2008 and 15 May 2008, he was the temporary chairman of the CD&V.

In November 2013, Wouter Beke was reelected as chairman of the CD&V. He was reelected with 98.7% of the votes.

== Honours ==
- Belgium : Knight of the Order of Leopold on 6 June 2010

== Notes ==
Party political offices
Preceded by Etienne Schouppe	Leader of Christian Democratic and Flemish; Acting; 2008	Succeeded by Marianne Thyssen
Preceded by Marianne Thyssen	Leader of Christian Democratic and Flemish; 2010–2019	Succeeded by Joachim Coens
