= Christian Democratic and Flemish =

Christian Democratic and Flemish Christen-Democratisch en Vlaams
- Abbreviation: CD&V
- President: Sammy Mahdi
- Founded: 1968; 58 years ago (CVP); 2001; 25 years ago (CD&V)
- Preceded by: Christian Social Party
- Headquarters: Wetstraat 89; 1040 Brussels
- Membership (2017): ▼48,791
- Ideology: Christian democracy Social conservatism
- Political position: Centre to centre-right
- Regional affiliation: Christian Group
- European affiliation: European People's Party
- European Parliament group: European People's Party Group
- International affiliation: Centrist Democrat International
- Francophone counterpart: Les Engagés
- Germanophone counterpart: Christian Social Party
- Colours: Orange
- Chamber of Representatives Flemish seats: 11 / 87
- Senate Flemish seats: 5 / 35
- Flemish Parliament: 16 / 124
- Brussels Parliament Flemish seats: 1 / 17
- European Parliament Flemish seats: 2 / 12
- Flemish Provincial Councils: 40 / 175
- Benelux Parliament: 2 / 21

Website
- cdenv.be

Christian Democratic and Flemish (Dutch: Christen-Democratisch en Vlaams [ˌkrɪstə(n)deːmoːˈkraːtis ɛɱ ˈvlaːms], CD&V) is a Flemish Christian democratic political party in Belgium. The party has historical ties to both trade unionism (ACV) and trade associations (UNIZO) and the Farmer's League. Until 2001, the party was named the Christian People's Party (Christelijke Volkspartij [ˈkrɪstələkə ˈvɔlkspɑrˌtɛi], CVP).

It was traditionally the largest political party of Flanders, until it was overtaken by the New Flemish Alliance (N-VA) in the 2010s. CD&V participated in most governments and has generally the largest number of mayors. Most prime ministers of Belgium and minister-presidents of Flanders have been CD&V politicians. Herman Van Rompuy, the president of the European Council from 2009 to 2014, is one of the leading politicians of CD&V.

CD&V is a member of the European People's Party (EPP) and Centrist Democrat International.

== History ==
The history of the CD&V dates back to the 19th century. It originated in the 19th century Catholic Party. At the end of the century, the new fraction of Christian democrats shifted the focus of the party slightly to the left. In the interwar years the party was renamed Catholic Bloc. Then, the Christian Social Party (PSC-CVP) existed from 1945 until 1968. In 1968, the PSC-CVP was split into the French-speaking Christian Social Party (PSC, now Les Engagés) and Flemish Christian People's Party (Christelijke Volkspartij CVP). In 2001 the CVP changed its name to the CD&V.

The party was almost continually in power from its establishment until 1999, with the exception of 1954–1958. In 1999, the Flemish Liberals and Democrats (VLD) became the largest party in Belgium, and formed a majority purple government of liberals, social democrats and greens. The same happened in the Flemish Government, but with the addition of Flemish nationalists. In 2003 CD&V again lost the federal elections which continued the federal centre-left coalition, but this time without the Greens.

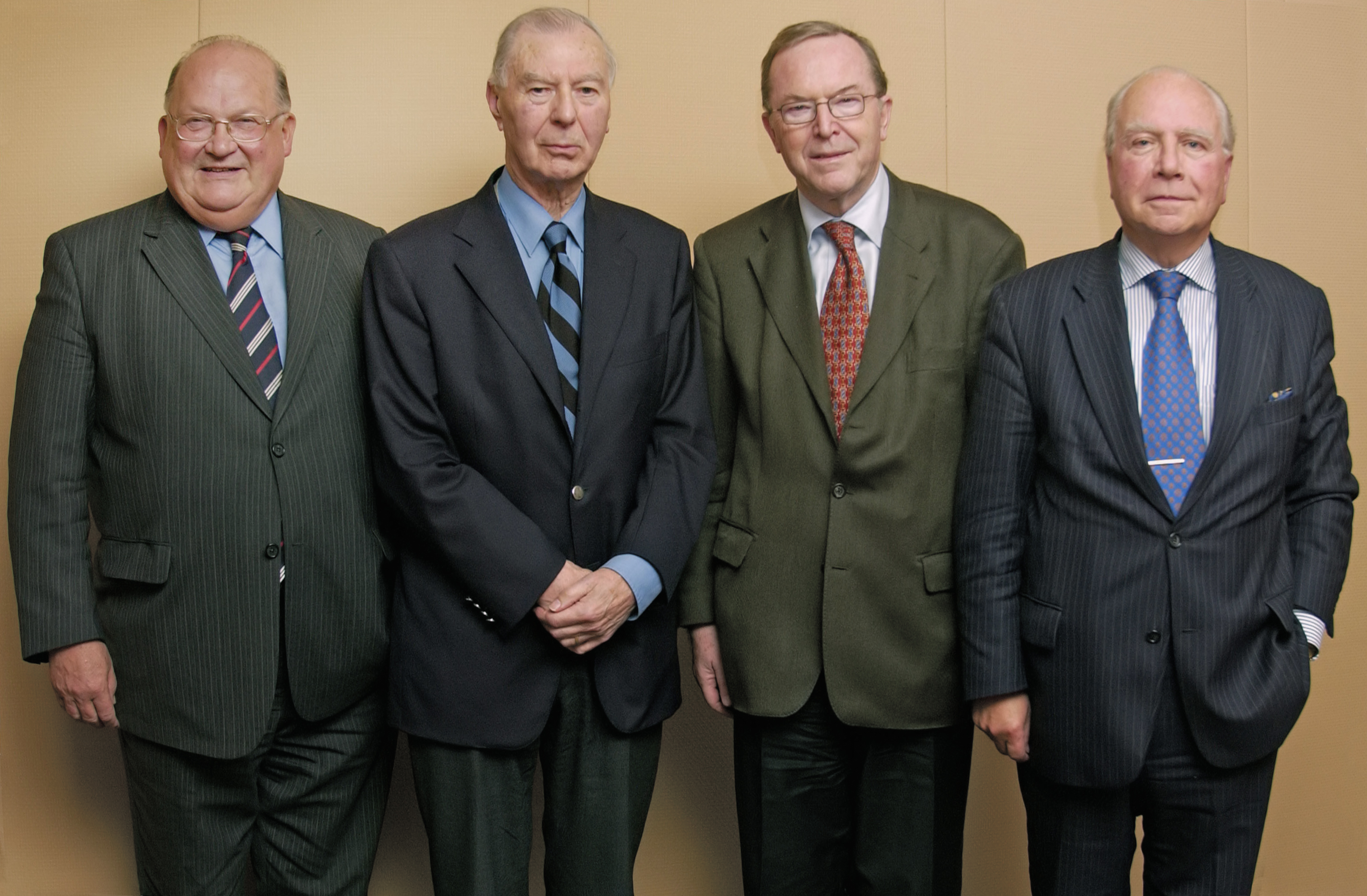
Former CVP Prime Ministers Dehaene, Tindemans, Martens and Eyskens in 2005

In 2004, Flemish elections were held and the CD&V once more became the largest political party by representation in the Flemish Parliament. Yves Leterme became Flemish minister-president. After successful local elections in 2006, the party became the largest party in the Belgian Chamber of Representatives after the federal elections of 2007. The CD&V led the subsequent coalition talks, which repeatedly stalled (see 2007–2008 Belgian government formation). On the 20 March 2008, a new federal government was finally assembled, led by Yves Leterme. Kris Peeters subsequently became the next minister-president of Flanders. From 30 December 2008 till 25 November 2009, Herman Van Rompuy led his first cabinet before becoming the first permanent president of the European Council. Afterwards, Yves Leterme led his second government.

In June 2009, Flemish elections were held and the CD&V remained the largest party of Flanders. Kris Peeters stayed as Flemish minister-president. The party also remained the largest Flemish party in the European Parliament after the 2009 European elections.

In 2010, the Open Flemish Liberals and Democrats (Open VLD) decided to step out of the federal coalition, consequently ending the government. The federal elections of 2010 resulted in a major loss of historic proportions for CD&V, largely due to votes lost to the Flemish-nationalist New Flemish Alliance. In the campaign, former prime minister Yves Leterme took a subtle step aside as frontrunner of the party. The president of the party, Marianne Thyssen, had pre-electorally stated that she was a candidate to become prime minister.

On 6 December 2011, the Di Rupo Government was formed, with the CD&V as the largest Flemish party.

During the local elections in 2012, CD&V managed to remain the largest Flemish party on the local level. It remained in the coalition of all five Flemish provinces and in three quarters of the municipalities. Almost half of these municipalities were subsequently led by CD&V mayors.

== Ideology ==
CD&V is a Flemish party that follows the principle of Christian democracy. Its core values include the importance of the family, promoting a respectful and warm society, and recognizing the intrinsic value of each individual. The party places a strong emphasis on well-being and health care, as well as the pursuit of an equitable income for all citizens. However, on the ethical front, CD&V holds conservative positions, particularly on issues such as abortion and euthanasia, where the party is reluctant to fast-track relaxations. Combining these conservative ethics with progressive socioeconomic policies, CD&V is often considered a "centre party". In its administrative activities, CD&V nurtures close ties with civil society, including trade unions, professional federations and various associations. In doing so, the party strives to represent the voice of rural areas and the agricultural sector.

== Members holding notable public offices ==
=== European politics ===
European Parliament
Name	Committees	Notes
Cindy Franssen	Employment and Social Affairs; Women's Rights and Gender Equality; Special Committee on Beating Cancer	
Tom Vandenkendelaere	Committee on the Internal Market and Consumer Protection; Subcommittee on Security and Defence	Replaces Kris Peeters, who became Vice-president of the EIB

=== Federal politics ===
Chamber of Representatives
Name	Notes	Name	Notes
(Antwerp Province) Servais Verherstraeten	Faction leader	(Antwerp Province) Jef Van den Bergh	
(Antwerp Province) Nahima Lanjri		(Flemish Brabant) Koen Geens	
(Flemish Brabant) Els Van Hoof		(Limburg (Belgium)) Steven Matheï	Replaces Wouter Beke, who became Flemish Minister
(Limburg (Belgium)) Nawal Farih		(East Flanders) Jan Briers	
(East Flanders) Leen Dierick		(West Flanders) Nathalie Muylle	
(West Flanders) Hendrik Bogaert		(West Flanders) Franky Demon	

Senate
Type	Name	Notes
Co-opted Senator	(Brussels) Baroness Sabine de Bethune	Faction leader
Community Senator	(Flemish Brabant) Peter Van Rompuy	Son of Herman Van Rompuy
Community Senator	(Flemish Brabant) Karin Brouwers	
Community Senator	(Antwerp Province) Orry Van de Wauwer	
Community Senator	(West Flanders) Martine Fournier	

Belgian Federal De Croo Government
Public Office	Name	Function
Deputy Prime Minister	Vincent Van Peteghem	Finance and the Coordination of the fight against fraud
Minister	Annelies Verlinden	the Interior, Institutional Reforms and Democratic Renewal
Secretary of State	Sammy Mahdi	Asylum and Migration

=== Regional politics ===
Flemish Parliament
Name	Notes	Name	Notes
(Flemish Brabant) Peter Van Rompuy	Fraction Leader	(Flemish Brabant) Karin Brouwers	Community Senator
(Flemish Brabant) Katrien Partyka	Mayor of Tienen	(Limburg (Belgium)) Jo Brouns	Mayor of Kinrooi
(Limburg (Belgium)) Lode Ceyssens	Mayor of Oudsbergen	(Limburg (Belgium)) Vera Jans	
(Antwerp Province) Orry Van de Wauwer	Community Senator	(Antwerp Province) Tinne Rombouts	
(Antwerp Province) Katrien Schryvers		(Antwerp Province) Koen Van den Heuvel	Mayor of Puurs-Sint-Amands
(East Flanders) Joke Schauvliege		(East Flanders) Stijn De Roo	Replaces Vincent Van Peteghem, who became Federal Minister
(East Flanders) Robrecht Bothuyne		(East Flanders) Maaike De Rudder	Mayor of Sint-Gillis-Waas
(West Flanders) Martine Fournier	Community Senator	(West Flanders) Brecht Warnez	Replace Hilde Crevits, who became Flemish Minister
(West Flanders) Bart Dochy	Mayor of Ledegem	(West Flanders) Loes Vandromme	
(West Flanders) Kurt Vanryckeghem	Mayor of Waregem		

Flemish Government Jambon
Public Office	Name	Function
Vice minister-president	Hilde Crevits	Economy, Employment, Social Economy, Innovation and Agriculture
Minister	Wouter Beke	Welfare, Health, Family and Poverty Reduction
Minister	Benjamin Dalle	relations with Brussels, Media and Youth

Parliament of the Brussels-Capital Region
Name	Notes
Bianca Debaets	

== Election results ==
=== Chamber of Representatives ===
Results for the Chamber of Representatives, in percentages for the Kingdom of Belgium. From 1971 to 1999: CVP figures. 2003: CD&V figures. 2007: CD&V/N-VA figures. From 2010 onwards: CD&V figures.

Election	Votes	%	Seats	+/-	Government
1971	967,701	18.3	47 / 212		Coalition
1974	1,222,646	23.2	50 / 212	▲3	Coalition
1977	1,460,757	26.2	56 / 212	▲6	Coalition
1978	1,447,112	26.1	57 / 212	▲1	Coalition
1981	1,165,239	19.3	43 / 212	▼14	Coalition
1985	1,291,244	21.3	49 / 212	▲6	Coalition
1987	1,195,363	19.4	43 / 212	▼6	Coalition
1991	1,036,165	16.8	39 / 212	▼4	Coalition
1995	1,042,933	17.2	29 / 150	▼10	Coalition
1999	875,967	14.1	22 / 150	▼7	Opposition
2003	870,749	13.3	21 / 150	▼1	Opposition
2007 (Note: In coalition with N-VA; 30 seats won by CD&V/N-VA)	1,234,950	18.5	25 / 150	▲4	Coalition
2010	707,986	10.9	17 / 150	▼8	Coalition
2014	783,060	11.6	18 / 150	▲1	Coalition
2019	602,520	8.9	12 / 150	▼6	Coalition
2024	557,392	7.9	11 / 150	▼1	Coalition

=== Senate ===
Election	Votes	%	Seats	+/-
1971 (Note: In coalition with Christian Social Party)	1,547,853	29.7	12 / 106	
1974	1,219,811	25.5	27 / 106	▲15
1977	1,446,806	26.2	28 / 106	▲1
1978	1,420,777	25.9	29 / 106	▲1
1981	1,149,353	19.3	22 / 106	▼7
1985	1,260,113	21.0	25 / 106	▲3
1987	1,169,377	19.2	22 / 106	▼3
1991	1,028,699	16.8	20 / 106	▼2
1995	1,009,656	16.8	7 / 40	▼13
1999	913,508	14.7	6 / 40	▼1
2003	832,849	12.7	6 / 40	0
2007 (Note: In coalition with N-VA; 9 seats won by CD&V/N-VA)	1,287,389	19.4	8 / 40	▲2
2010	646,375	10.0	4 / 40	▼4

=== Regional ===
==== Brussels Parliament ====
Election	Votes	%		Seats	+/-	Government
Election	Votes	D.E.C.	Overall	Seats	+/-	Government
1989	18,523		4.2 (#6)	4 / 75		Coalition
1995	13,586		3.3 (#6)	3 / 75	▼1	Coalition
1999	14,284	23.6 (#2)	2.3 (#6)	3 / 75	0	Coalition
2004 (Note: In coalition with N-VA; 3 seats won by CD&V/N-VA)	10,482	16.8 (#4)	2.3 (#9)	3 / 89	0	Coalition
2009	7,696	14.8 (#4)	1.7 (#9)	3 / 89	0	Coalition
2014	6,105	11.4 (#5)	1.3 (#13)	2 / 89	▼1	Coalition
2019	5,231	7.5 (#6)	1.1 (#14)	1 / 89	▼1	Opposition
2024	5,102	6.3 (#8)	1.0 (#15)	1 / 89	0	TBD

==== Flemish Parliament ====
Election	Votes	%	Seats	+/-	Government
1995	1,010,505	26.8 (#1)	37 / 124		Coalition
1999	857,732	22.1 (#1)	30 / 124	▼7	Opposition
2004 (Note: In coalition with N-VA; 35 seats won by CD&V/N-VA)	1,060,580	26.1 (#1)	29 / 124	▼1	Coalition
2009	939,873	22.9 (#1)	31 / 124	▲2	Coalition
2014	860,685	20.5 (#2)	27 / 124	▼4	Coalition
2019	652,766	15.4 (#3)	19 / 124	▼8	Coalition
2024	571,137	13.0 (#4)	16 / 124	▼3	Coalition

=== Provincial ===
Election	Votes	%	Councilors
1994			152 / 401
2000			128 / 411
2006	1,231,655	30.6	136 / 411
2012	877,019	21.5	82 / 351
2018	822,488	19.7	40 / 175

=== European Parliament ===
Election	List leader	Votes	%		Seats	+/-	EP Group
Election	List leader	Votes	D.E.C.	Overall	Seats	+/-	EP Group
1979	Leo Tindemans	1,607,941	48.09 (#1)	29.54	7 / 24	New	EPP
1984	Leo Tindemans	1,132,682	32.53 (#1)	19.80	4 / 24	▼3	EPP
1989	Leo Tindemans	1,247,075	34.08 (#1)	21.14	5 / 24	▲1	EPP
1994	Leo Tindemans	1,013,266	27.43 (#1)	16.98	4 / 25	▼1	EPP
1999	Miet Smet	839,720	21.68 (#2)	13.49	3 / 25	▼1	EPP-ED
2004 (Note: In coalition with N-VA; 4 seats won by CD&V/N-VA)	Jean-Luc Dehaene	1,131,119	28.15 (#1)	17.43	3 / 24	0	EPP-ED
2009	Jean-Luc Dehaene	948,123	23.26 (#1)	14.43	3 / 22	0	EPP
2014	Marianne Thyssen	840,814	19.96 (#3)	12.56	2 / 21	▼1	EPP
2019	Kris Peeters	617,651	14.53 (#4)	9.17	2 / 21	0	EPP
2024	Wouter Beke	594,968	13.20 (#3)	8.84	2 / 22	0	EPP

== Presidents ==
CVP/PSC

- 1945–1947 Gilbert Mullie
- 1947–1949 Paul Willem Segers
- 1949–1959 Jef De Schuyffeleer
- 1959–1961 Fred Bertrand
- 1961–1963 Jozef De Saeger
- 1963–1968 Robert Vandekerckhove

CVP

- 1968–1972 Robert Vandekerckhove
- 1972–1979 Wilfried Martens
- 1979–1982 Leo Tindemans
- 1982–1988 Frank Swaelen
- 1988–1993 Herman Van Rompuy
- 1993–1996 Johan Van Hecke
- 1996–1999 Marc Van Peel
- 1999–2001 Stefaan De Clerck

CD&V

- 2001–2003 Stefaan De Clerck
- 2003–2004 Yves Leterme
- 2004–2007 Jo Vandeurzen
- 2007–2008 Etienne Schouppe
- 2008–2008 Wouter Beke
- 2008–2010 Marianne Thyssen
- 2010–2019 Wouter Beke
- 2019 Cindy Franssen & Griet Smaers (ad interim)
- 2019–2022 Joachim Coens
- 2022–present Sammy Mahdi

Until 1968 this lists gives the president of the Flemish part of the unitary CVP/PSC. The party changed its name from CVP to CD&V on 29 September 2001.

== See also ==
- Christene Volkspartij
- Graves de communi re
