= Wouter Vermeersch =

Belgian-Flemish politician

Member of the Chamber of Representatives
- Incumbent
- Assumed office 26 May 2019

Personal details
- Born: Wouter Vermeersch; 8 November 1984 (age 41) Courtrai, Belgium
- Party: LDD (Before 2017); Vlaams Belang (2017–present)
- Education: University of Antwerp

Wouter Vermeersch (born 8 November 1984, Courtrai) is a Belgian politician from Flanders for the Vlaams Belang party and a member of the Chamber of Representatives.

== Biography ==
Vermeersch studied a degree in engineering at the University of Antwerp. He worked as an auditor for Deloitte and then as a professional manager of companies specializing in green energy

He first became involved in politics when he joined the LDD party led by Jean-Marie Dedecker and helped to set up the LDD's youth wing JongLibertairen. During the 2007 Belgian regional elections he stood as a candidate for the LDD in the Flemish Parliament but was not elected. In 2017 Vermeersch left LDD and became an adviser to the Europe of Nations and Freedom group in the European Parliament and subsequently joined Vlaams Belang. Since January 2019, he has been a councilor in Courtrai where he is also the leader of the VB's local chapter. In the federal elections in May 2019, Vermeersch was elected to the Chamber of Representatives and headed the VB's list for the West Flanders constituency.
