= Vooruit (political party) =

Onward Vooruit
- President: Conner Rousseau
- Founded: 1978; 48 years ago
- Preceded by: Belgian Socialist Party
- Headquarters: Keizerslaan 13, Brussels
- Youth wing: Jongsocialisten
- Membership (2014): ▼49,703
- Ideology: Social democracy
- Political position: Centre-left
- European affiliation: Party of European Socialists
- European Parliament group: Progressive Alliance of Socialists and Democrats
- International affiliation: Progressive Alliance
- Francophone counterpart: Socialist Party
- Colours: Red
- Chamber of Representatives: 13 / 87
- Senate (Flemish seats): 4 / 35
- Flemish Parliament: 18 / 124
- Brussels Parliament (Flemish seats): 2 / 17
- European Parliament (Flemish seats): 2 / 12
- Flemish Provincial Councils: 18 / 175

Website
- vooruit.org
- Politics of Belgium; Political parties; Elections; Formerly; Socialist Party; Socialistische Partij (1978–2001); Socialist Party Differently; Socialistische Partij Anders (2001–2021)

Vooruit (Dutch pronunciation: [voːrˈœyt], lit. 'Forward') is a Flemish social democratic political party in Belgium.

The party was founded following the linguistic split of the unitary Belgian Socialist Party in 1978, which also produced the Francophone Socialist Party. It was formerly known as the Socialist Party (1978–2001: Socialistische Partij, SP) and subsequently "Socialist Party Alternative" (2001–2021: Socialistische Partij Anders, SP.A) until 2021, when its current name was adopted.

From December 2011 to September 2014, the party was part of the Di Rupo Government, along with its Francophone counterpart. In 2020, it re-entered federal government as part of the De Croo Government. The party has been a part of the Flemish Government several times.

== History ==
=== Since 1978 ===
The party was the big winner in the 2003 election, running on the SP.A–Spirit joint list (cartel) with the social-liberal party Spirit. Their share of the vote went up from 9% (of the total Belgian vote) to almost 15%, a second place in the number of votes. The main victim of this resurgence was the Green! party (formerly known as Agalev). SP.A was part of the "purple" federal coalitions of Prime Minister Guy Verhofstadt from 12 July 1999 until 10 June 2007, which contained both the Flemish and Francophone liberal and social-democratic parties.

In 2004, the SP.A along with its partner Spirit lost the elections for the Flemish Parliament. Although they won more seats in comparison to the Flemish elections of 1999, their percentage of the vote compared to the successful 2003 federal elections was considerably down. The reputation of then party leader Steve Stevaert took a beating too.

The party was briefly led by Caroline Gennez, after former president Steve Stevaert left to become governor of Limburg. Johan Vande Lanotte, who served as Minister of the Budget in the federal Government, was elected President and resigned as minister to become President on 17 October 2005. He resigned 11 June 2007, after SP.A–Spirit lost the elections for the federal parliament of 10 June 2007. In these federal elections, the cartel won 14 out of 150 seats in the Chamber of Representatives and 4 out of 40 seats in the Senate. Afterwards, Caroline Gennez was elected President by the party members.

As of May 2009, SP.A was in opposition in federal politics. Unlike its Francophone counterpart, the Socialist Party (PS), SP.A was not a participant in the Leterme II Government.

In January 2009, the party had apparently changed its name to Socialists and Progressive Differently (Dutch: Socialisten en Progressieven Anders). This name change was retracted and the party baseline was changed from Social Progressive Alternative (Dutch: Sociaal Progressief Alternatief) to Socialists and Progressive Differently (Dutch: Socialisten en Progressieven Anders).

In the 2010 federal election, SP.A won 13 seats with 9% of the overall vote. The party was a member of the Di Rupo Government formed on 6 December 2011, until the elections in 2014. In the elections for the Chamber of Representatives on 25 May 2014, SP.A scored again 9% and received 13 seats, in contrast to their francophone Socialist Party counterparts, who lost 3 seats and whose share of the vote decreased by 2%. In the Flemish Parliament, SP.A have 18 representatives, deriving from around 14% of the vote—this is a small reduction on the 2009 parliament, where SP.A had 19 seats, deriving from 15% of the popular vote. From 2009–2014, SP.A participated in the Flemish Government, in an uneasy coalition with the CD & V and the N-VA. From 2014 onwards, SP.A formed part of the opposition in Flanders, as the regional government reflected the Flemish component of the federal administration, consisting of coalition of the Open-VLD, CD & V and the N-VA.

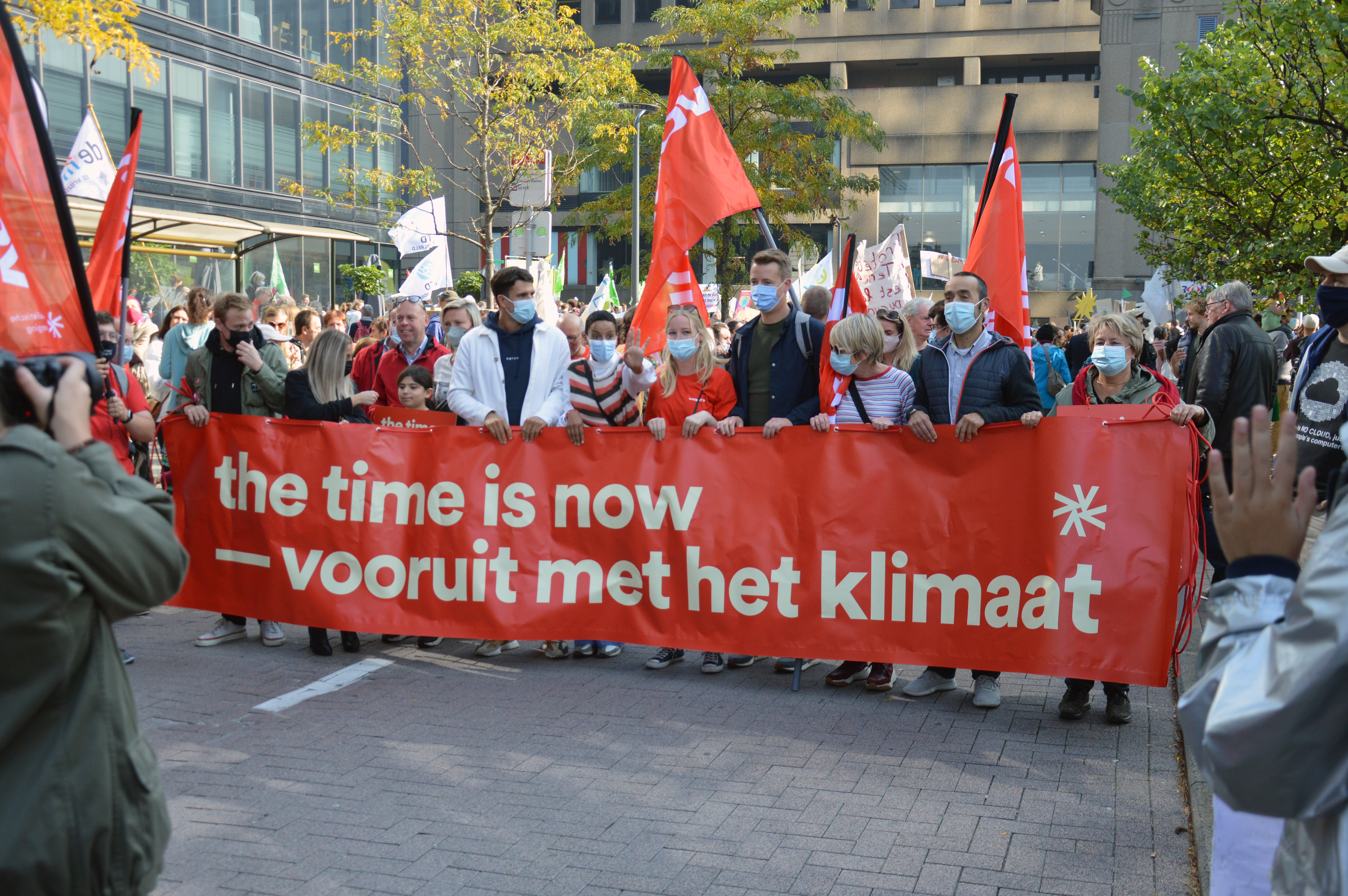
Leaders and representatives at a climate march, October 2021

In January 2018, the party advocated for a "new socialism" and a "new equality". In September 2020, party leader Conner Rousseau announced a renaming of the party to Vooruit ("Forward"). The new name was made official on 21 March 2021.

== Political views ==
Vooruit is a centre-left Flemish social democratic party. Equal opportunities and solidarity are central to the party. The party strives to ensure that those who earn the most or own the greatest wealth also pay the highest taxes so that the government can meet the needs of people who are less fortunate. Vooruit focuses on protecting the purchasing power of ordinary citizens. It opposes cuts in social security and advocates investment, especially in education and health care.

== Symbols ==
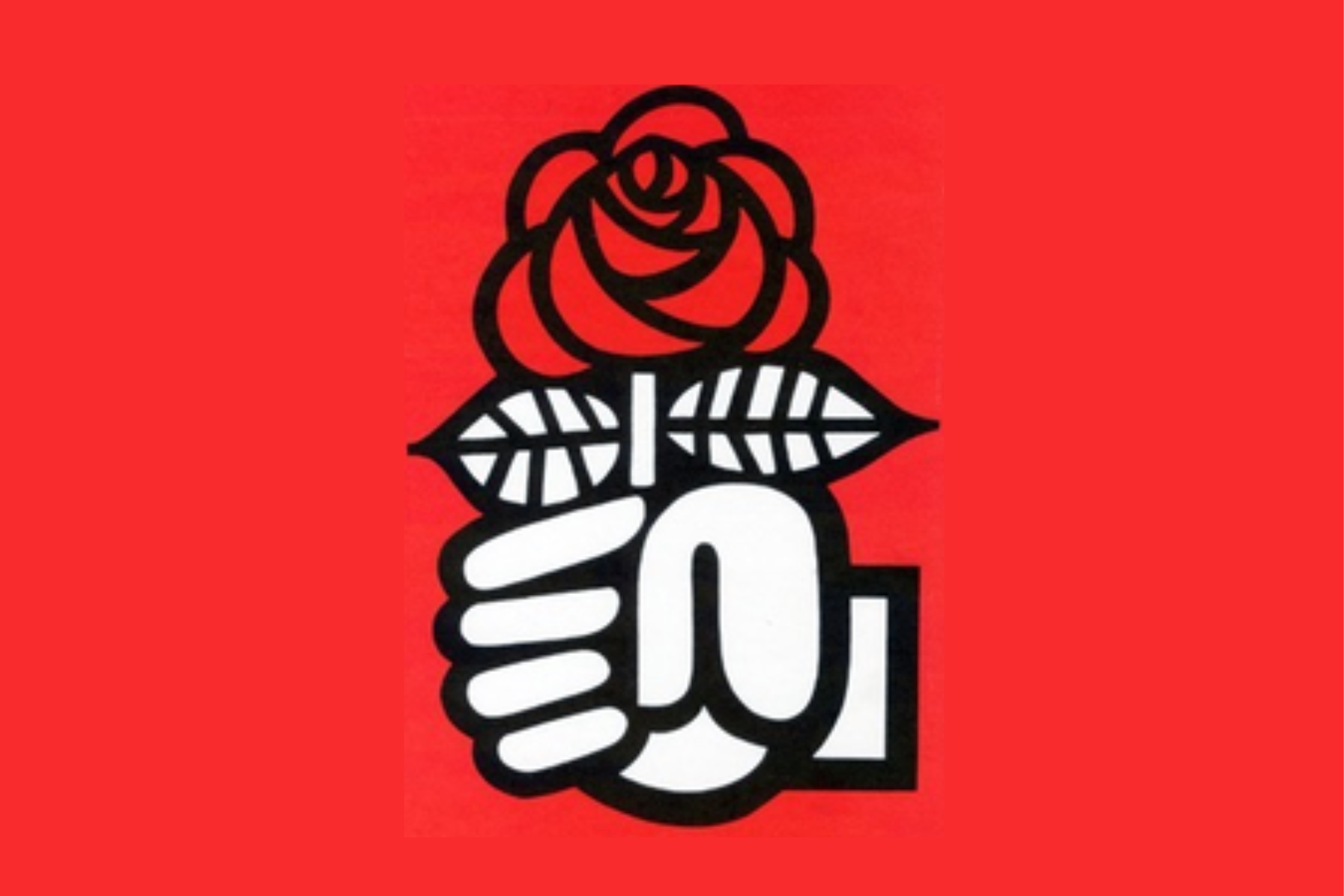
Flag of BSP (1973–1978)

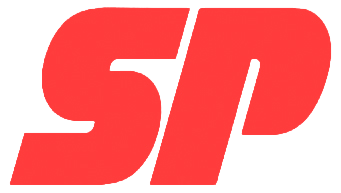
Logo of Socialist Party (1978–2001)

Logo of SP.A (2001–2010)

Logo of SP.A (2010–2018)

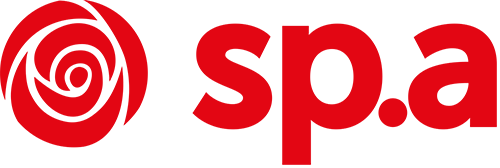
Logo of SP.A (2018–2021)

Logo of VOORUIT (2021–)

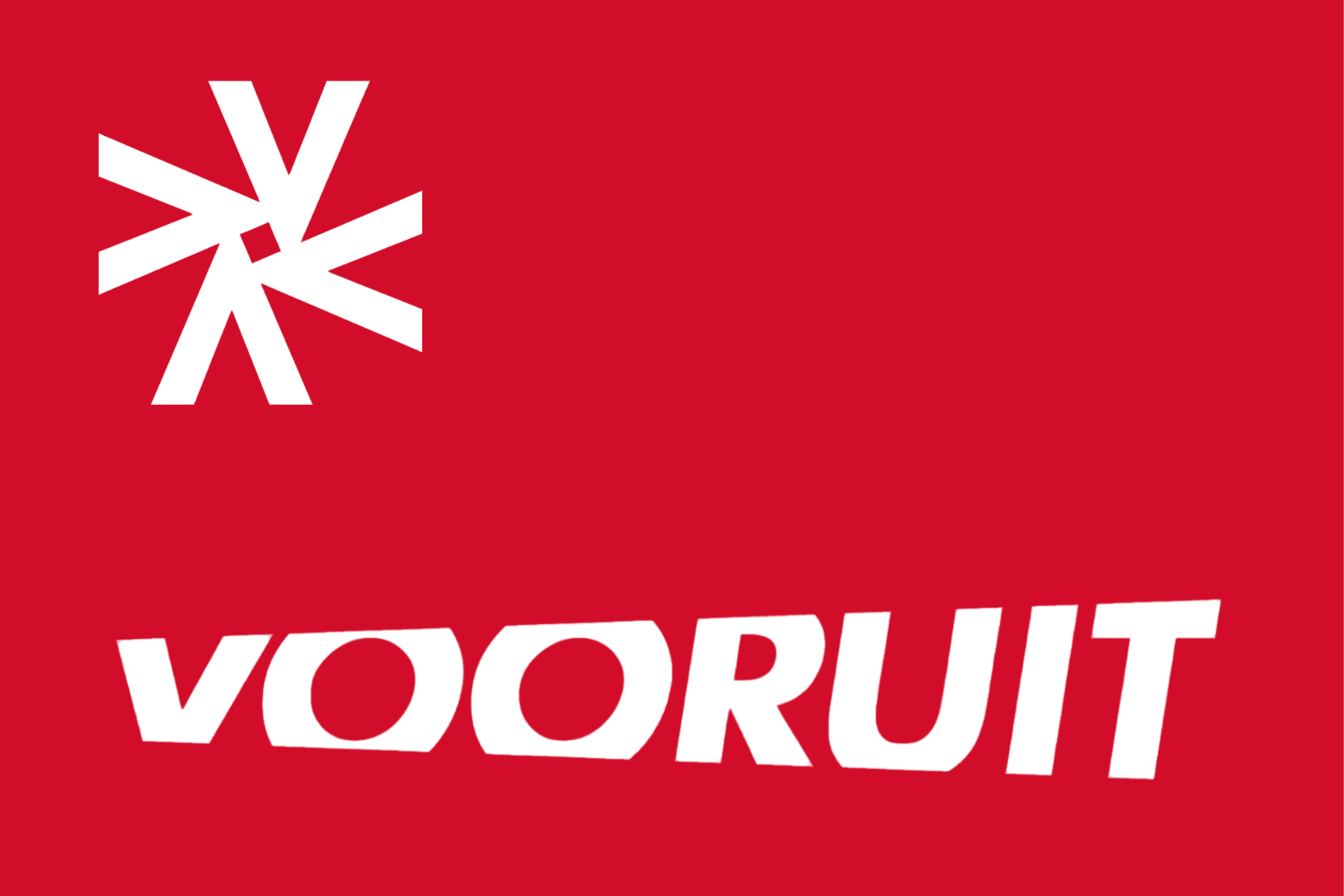
Flag of Vooruit (2021–)

== Presidents ==
Party presidents
Period	President	Vice-President
1978–1989	Karel Van Miert	N/A
1989–1994	Frank Vandenbroucke	N/A
1994–1998	Louis Tobback	N/A
1998–1999	Fred Erdman	N/A
1999–2003	Patrick Janssens	N/A
2003–2005	Steve Stevaert	Caroline Gennez
2005	Caroline Gennez (ad interim)	N/A
2005–2007	Johan Vande Lanotte	Caroline Gennez
2007–2011	Caroline Gennez	Dirk Van der Maelen
2011–2015	Bruno Tobback	Joke Quintens
2015–2019	John Crombez	Stephanie Van Houtven
2019–2023	Conner Rousseau	Funda Oru
2023–2024	Melissa Depraetere (ad interim)	Funda Oru
2024–present	Conner Rousseau	Funda Oru

== Members holding notable public offices ==
=== European politics ===
European Parliament
Name	Committees
Kathleen Van Brempt	International Trade

=== Federal politics ===
Chamber of Representatives
Name	Notes	Name	Notes
(West Flanders) Melissa Depraetere	Faction leader	(West Flanders) Vicky Reynaert	
(Antwerp Province) Jan Bertels		(Antwerp Province) Ben Segers	
(Limburg (Belgium)) Bert Moyaers		(Limburg (Belgium)) Kris Verduyckt	
(East Flanders) Anja Vanrobaeys		(East Flanders) Joris Vandenbroucke	
(Flemish Brabant) Karine Jiroflée			

Senate
Type	Name	Notes
Co-opted Senator	(Brussels) Bert Anciaux	Faction leader
Community Senator	(East Flanders) Kurt De Loor	
Community Senator	(Flemish Brabant) Katia Segers	
Community Senator	(West Flanders) Annick Lambrecht	

Belgian Federal De Croo Government
Public Office	Name	Function
Deputy Prime Minister	Frank Vandenbroucke	Social Affairs and Public Health
Minister	Meryame Kitir	Development Cooperation and Urban Policy

=== Regional politics ===
Flemish Parliament
Name	Notes	Name	Notes
(Brussels) Hannelore Goeman	Fraction Leader	(East Flanders) Conner Rousseau	Party President
(East Flanders) Kurt De Loor	Community Senator	(East Flanders) Freya Van den Bossche	
(West Flanders) Annick Lambrecht	Community Senator	(West Flanders) Steve Vandenberghe	Mayor of Bredene
(West Flanders) Maxim Veys		(Flemish Brabant) Katia Segers	Community Senator
(Flemish Brabant) Bruno Tobback		(Antwerp Province) Caroline Gennez	
(Antwerp Province) Hannes Anaf		(Limburg (Belgium)) Els Robeyns	Mayor of Wellen
(Limburg (Belgium)) Ludwig Vandenhove			

Parliament of the Brussels-Capital Region
Name	Notes
Fouad Ahidar	
Els Rochette	
Hilde Sabbe	

Brussels Regional Government Vervoort II
Public Office	Name	Function
Minister	Pascal Smet	Urbanism, European and International Affairs, Foreign Trade, Fire Fighting and Emergency Medical Assistance

=== Provincial politics ===
Provincial Council
Province	Percentage	Seats
Antwerp	12,80%	10 / 72
Limburg	20,10%°	13 / 63
East Flanders	12,70%	9 / 72
Flemish Brabant	12,10%	8 / 72
West Flanders	15,80%	12 / 72

° In Limburg, SP.A formed a cartel with Groen.

== Election results ==
=== Chamber of Representatives ===
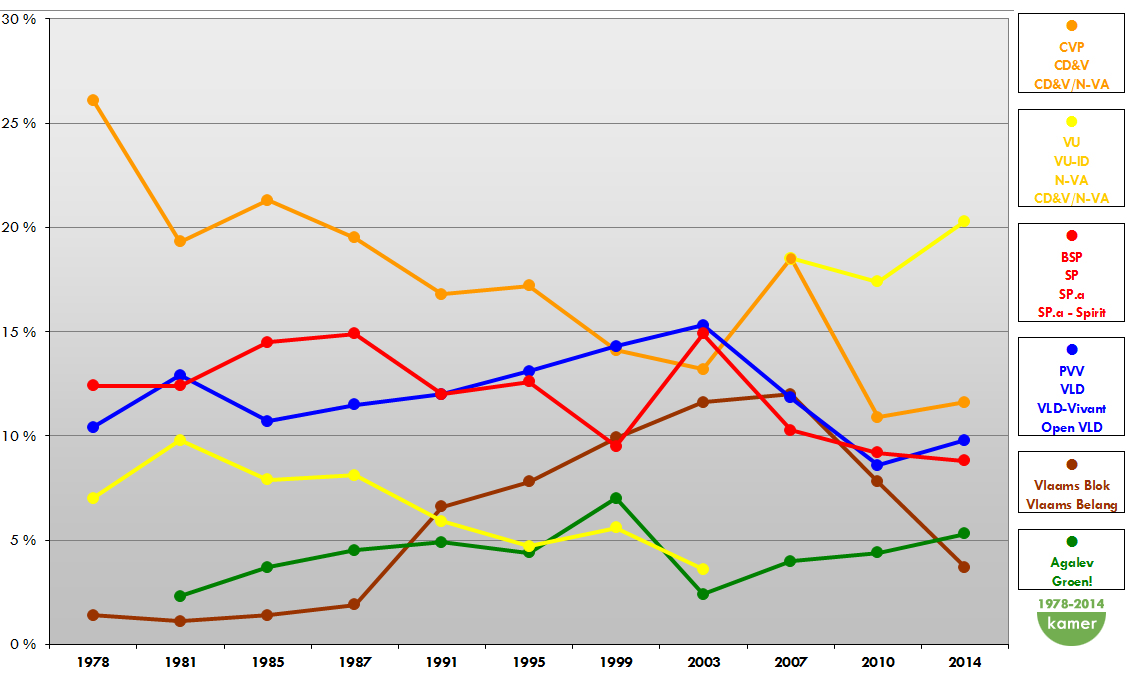
The main six Flemish political parties and their results for the Chamber of Representatives from 1978 to 2014 in percentages for the complete kingdom

Election	Votes	%	Seats	+/-	Government
1978	684,976	12.4	26 / 212		Coalition
1981	744,593	12.4	26 / 212		Opposition
1985	882,200	14.6	32 / 212	▲6	Opposition
1987	915,432	14.9	32 / 212	0	Coalition
1991	737,976	12.0	28 / 212	▼4	Coalition
1995	762,444	12.6	20 / 150	▼8	Coalition
1999	593,372	9.5	14 / 150	▼6	Coalition
2003*	979,750	14.9	23 / 150	▲9	Coalition
2007	684,390	10.3	14 / 150	▼9	Opposition
2010	602,867	9.2	13 / 150	▼1	Coalition
2014	595,190	8.8	13 / 150	0	Opposition
2019	455,034	6.7	9 / 150	▼4	External support (2020)
2019	455,034	6.7	9 / 150	▼4	Coalition (2020-2025)
2024	566,436	8.1	13 / 150	▲4	Coalition

=== Senate ===
Election	Votes	%	Seats	+/-
1978	678,776	12.4	13 / 106	
1981	732,126	12.3	13 / 106	0
1985	868,624	14.5	16 / 106	▲3
1987	896,294	14.7	17 / 106	▲1
1991	730,274	11.9	14 / 106	▼3
1995	792,941	13.2	6 / 40	▼8
1999	550,657	8.9	4 / 40	▼2
2003 (Note: In cartel with Spirit)	1,013,560	15.5	7 / 40	▲3
2007	665,342	10.0	4 / 40	▼3
2010	613,079	9.5	4 / 40	0

=== Regional ===
==== Brussels Parliament ====
Election	Votes	%		Seats	+/-	Government
Election	Votes	D.E.C.	Overall	Seats	+/-	Government
1995	11,710		2.7 (#9)	2 / 75		Coalition
1995	9,987		2.4 (#9)	2 / 75	0	Coalition
1999 (Note: In cartel with Agalev)	13,223	21.8 (#4)	3.1 (#8)	2 / 75	0	Coalition
2004	11,052	17.7 (#3)	2.4 (#8)	3 / 89	▲1	Coalition
2009	10,085	19.5 (#2)	2.2 (#6)	4 / 89	▲1	Opposition
2014	10,450	19.5 (#2)	2.3 (#8)	3 / 89	▼1	Coalition
2019	10,540	15.1 (#3)	2.3 (#10)	3 / 89	0	Coalition
2024	8,045	10.0 (#6)	1.6 (#11)	2 / 89	▼1	Coalition

==== Flemish Parliament ====
Election	Votes	%	Seats	+/-	Government
1995	733,703	19.4 (#3)	25 / 124		Coalition
1999	582,419	15.0 (#4)	19 / 124	▼6	Coalition
2004 (Note: In coalition with Spirit; 25 seats won by SP.A/Spirit)	799,325	19.7 (#4)	22 / 124	▲3	Coalition
2009	627,852	15.3 (#3)	19 / 124	▼3	Coalition
2014	587,903	14.0 (#4)	18 / 124	▼1	Opposition
2019	438,589	10.3 (#5)	13 / 124	▼5	Opposition
2024	606,406	13.8 (#3)	18 / 124	▲5	Coalition

=== European Parliament ===
Election	List leader	Votes	%		Seats	+/-	EP Group
Election	List leader	Votes	D.E.C.	Overall	Seats	+/-	EP Group
1979	Karel Van Miert	698,889	20.90 (#2)	12.84	3 / 24	New	SOC
1984	Karel Van Miert	979,702	28.13 (#2)	17.12	4 / 24	▲1	SOC
1989	Marc Galle	733,242	20.04 (#2)	12.43	3 / 24	▼1	SOC
1994	Freddy Willockx	651,371	17.63 (#3)	10.92	3 / 25	0	PES
1999	Frank Vandenbroucke	550,237	14.21 (#4)	8.89	2 / 25	▼1	PES
2004 (Note: Run in a joint list with Spirit.)	Mia De Vits	716,317	17.83 (#3)	11.04	3 / 24	▲1	PES
2009	Kathleen Van Brempt	539,393	13.23 (#4)	8.21	2 / 22	▼1	S&D
2014	Kathleen Van Brempt	555,354	13.18 (#4)	8.30	1 / 21	▼1	S&D
2019	Kathleen Van Brempt	434,002	10.21 (#6)	6.45	1 / 21	0	S&D
2024	Bruno Tobback	570,067	12.64 (#4)	8.47	2 / 22	▲1	S&D
