= Hendrik Bogaert =

Belgian politician

- Born: 30 August 1968 (age 58); Bruges, Belgium
- Occupation: Politician

Hendrik Bogaert (born 30 August 1968) is a Belgian politician from Flanders and member of the Christian Democratic and Flemish party (CD&V). Since 2003, he is member of the Belgian Chamber of Representatives. He studied Master in Economics at KU Leuven and an MBA at Harvard Business School. He has been mayor of Jabbeke.

On 6 December 2011, he became Secretary of State for Civil Service and Modernisation of Public Services in the Di Rupo I Government.

On 19 December 2023, he revealed in De Afspraak, to found a new party called Redelijk Rechts (Reasonable Right).
