= John Crombez =

Belgian politician

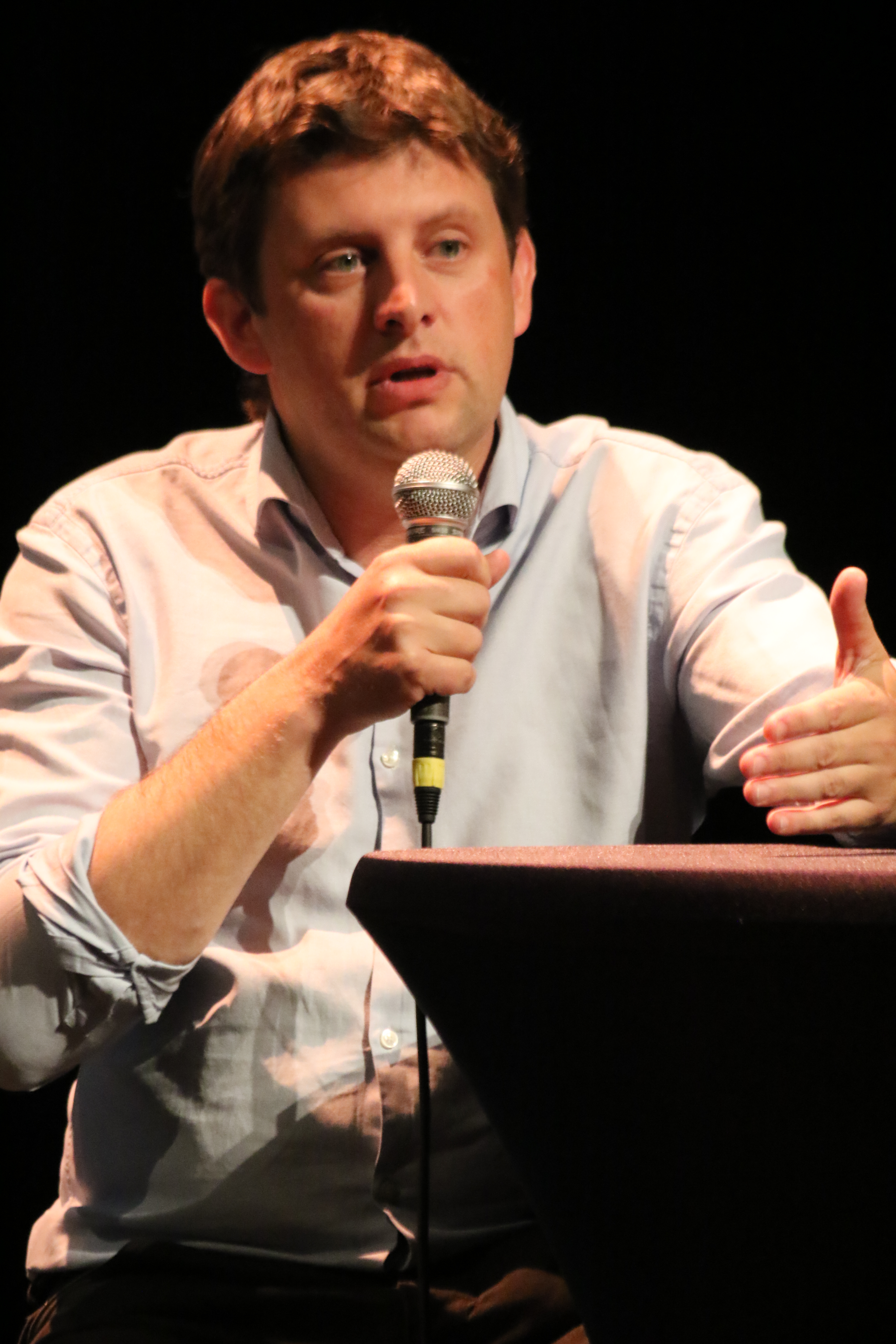

Leader of the Socialist Party Differently

Personal details
- Born: 19 September 1973 (age 52) Ostend, Belgium
- Party: Vooruit (political party)
- Occupation: Politician
- Website: Official website

John Crombez (born 19 September 1973) is a Belgian politician. He was leader of the Socialist Party Differently (sp.a) from 2015 to 2019. In the Di Rupo Government (2011–2014) he was Secretary of State for combatting fraud.

In 2009, Crombez was elected to the Flemish Parliament, where he was parliamentary leader from July 2010 to December 2011 and has been again since September 2014.

Crombez studied economics at Ghent University.
