= Benelux Parliament =

Parliament

Benelux Interparliamentary Assembly: Benelux Interparlementaire Assemblee (Dutch); Assemblée interparlementaire Benelux (French)

Type
- Type: Unicameral

History
- Founded: 5 November 1955

Leadership
- President: Francine Closener, SGD
- Vice-President: Yves Evrard, Liberal
- Vice-President: Pim van Ballekom, Liberal

Structure
- Seats: 49 members; 21 from Belgium; 21 from the Netherlands; 7 from Luxembourg
- Political groups: CRD (17) (Note: Belgium: N-VA (4) CD&V (2) LE (2) CSP (1) Netherlands: CDA (2) CU (1) BBB (1) OPNL (1) Luxembourg: CSV (2) ADR (1)); Liberal (14) (Note: Belgium: MR (4) Netherlands: D66 (4) VVD (4) Luxembourg: DP (2)); SGD (10) (Note: Belgium: Vooruit (2) PS (2) Netherlands: GL–PvdA (3) SP (1) Luxembourg: DG (1) LSAP (1)); VB–PVV (7) (Note: Belgium: VB (3) Netherlands: PVV (4)); Non-attached (1) (Note: Belgium: PVDA-PTB (1))

Meeting place
- Various places in Belgium, the Netherlands and Luxembourg

Website
- beneluxparl.eu

The Benelux Interparliamentary Assembly, commonly known as the Benelux Parliament, is one of the institutions of the Benelux Union. The assembly was established through an agreement signed by Belgium, the Netherlands and Luxembourg on 5 November 1955, which means it had already existed for three years when the Benelux Union was established on 3 February 1958. The Benelux Parliament provides the governments with advice on economic and transnational cooperation. Its recommendations may also concern other matters if common interests or current events so dictate. The parliament also keeps the three governments informed about the opinions that move in the parliamentary assemblies from which its members originate.

In its session on 12 and 13 June 2009, the Benelux Parliament unanimously adopted a recommendation to modernise its way of working and to review the agreement signed between the three Benelux states. After some years of discussions about the extension of the competences of the Benelux Parliament, a new agreement was signed on 20 January 2015. It strengthened the right to interpellation and improved the parliament's ways of working. An extension of its competences to include a right of decision was not included. This new agreement changed the parliament's official name from the previous Benelux Interparliamentary Consultative Council to its current official name.

== Members ==
The Benelux Parliament consists of 49 members: 21 delegates from Belgium, 21 delegates of the States General of the Netherlands, and 7 delegates of the Chamber of Deputies of Luxembourg. The Belgian members are elected from amongst the members of the Chamber of Representatives and the parliaments of the communities and regions. (Note: 10 from the Chamber of Representatives, 5 from the Flemish Parliament, 2 from the Parliament of the French Community, 2 from the Parliament of Wallonia, 1 from the Parliament of the Brussels-Capital Region, and 1 from the Parliament of the German-speaking Community.) For each of the 49 members, there is a substitute member who can replace that member if necessary.

=== Political groups ===
The members of the Benelux Parliament are divided into four political groups. The Christian group includes members of CD&V, the CSP, Les Engagés (LE), and the N-VA from Belgium; the BBB, the CDA, the Christian Union (CU), and OPNL from the Netherlands; and the CSV and the ADR from Luxembourg. The Socialists, Greens and Democrats (SGD) group includes members of Vooruit and the PS from Belgium; Pro and the SP from the Netherlands; and The Greens (DG) and the LSAP from Luxembourg. The Liberal group includes members of the MR from Belgium; the VVD and D66 from the Netherlands; and the DP from Luxembourg. Vlaams Belang (VB) from Belgium and the PVV from the Netherlands form their own joint group.

The PVDA-PTB from Belgium does not belong to any group. In the past, FVD, JA21, and the PvdD from the Netherlands were not part of any group. The SGD included GroenLinks and PvdA from the Netherlands and Ecolo and Groen from Belgium.

Political groups in the Benelux Parliament
Name	Parliamentary leader	Ideologies	Seats
Christian Group with Regionalists and Democratic Allies	Theo Bovens	Christian democracy Conservatism	17 / 49
Liberal Group	Jan Schoonis	Liberalism	14 / 49
Socialists, Greens and Democrats	Patrick Prévot	Social democracy Green politics Democratic socialism	10 / 49
Vlaams Belang–Party for Freedom	Barbara Pas	Nationalism; Right-wing populism	7 / 49
Non-attached members	—	—	1 / 49

=== List of members ===
As of April 2026:

Name	Country	Legislative body	Party	Group
Barbara Agostino	Luxembourg	Chamber of Deputies	DP	Liberal
Bente Becker	Netherlands	House of Representatives	VVD	Liberal
Djuna Bernard	Luxembourg	Chamber of Deputies	DG	SGD
Valérie Bluge	Belgium	Parliament of Wallonia	MR	Liberal
Nabil Boukili	Belgium	Chamber of Representatives	PVDA-PTB	Non-attached
Theo Bovens	Netherlands	Senate	CDA	CDR
Judith Bühler	Netherlands	House of Representatives	CDA	CRD
Francine Closener	Luxembourg	Chamber of Deputies	LSAP	SGD
Geoffroy Coomans de Brachène	Belgium	Parliament of the Brussels-Capital Region	MR	Liberal
Patricia Creutz-Vilvoye	Belgium	Parliament of the German-speaking Community	CSP	CRD
Robert Croll	Netherlands	Senate	D66	Liberal
Johan Deckmyn	Belgium	Flemish Parliament	VB	VB–PVV
Daan de Kort	Netherlands	House of Representatives	VVD	Liberal
Peter De Roover	Belgium	Chamber of Representatives	N-VA	CRD
Anthony Dufrane	Belgium	Chamber of Representatives	MR	Liberal
Yves Evrard	Belgium	Parliament of the French Community	MR	Liberal
Marjolein Faber	Netherlands	House of Representatives	PVV	VB–PVV
Anne-Catherine Goffinet	Belgium	Parliament of the French Community	LE	CRD
Gusty Graas	Luxembourg	Chamber of Deputies	DP	Liberal
Karolien Grosemans	Belgium	Flemish Parliament	N-VA	CRD
Rik Janssen	Netherlands	Senate	SP	SGD
Françoise Kemp	Luxembourg	Chamber of Deputies	CSV	CRD
Michel Lemaire	Luxembourg	Chamber of Deputies	ADR	CRD
Nicole Maes	Netherlands	House of Representatives	VVD	Liberal
Steven Matheï	Belgium	Chamber of Representatives	CD&V	CRD
Octavie Modert	Luxembourg	Chamber of Deputies	CSV	CRD
Kurt Moons	Belgium	Chamber of Representatives	VB	VB–PVV
Ismaël Nuino	Belgium	Chamber of Representatives	LE	CRD
Katrien Partyka	Belgium	Flemish Parliament	CD&V	CRD
Barbara Pas	Belgium	Chamber of Representatives	VB	VB–PVV
Patrick Prévot	Belgium	Chamber of Representatives	PS	SGD
Artie Ramsodit-de Graaf	Netherlands	Senate	GL–PvdA	SGD
Jan Schoonis	Netherlands	House of Representatives	D66	Liberal
Patrick Spies	Belgium	Parliament of Wallonia	PS	SGD
Hendrik-Jan Talsma	Netherlands	Senate	CU	CRD
Robert van Asten	Netherlands	House of Representatives	D66	Liberal
Pim van Ballekom	Netherlands	Senate	VVD	Liberal
Wim Van der Donckt	Belgium	Chamber of Representatives	N-VA	CRD
Auke van der Goot	Netherlands	Senate	OPNL	CRD
Roel van Gurp	Netherlands	House of Representatives	GL–PvdA	SGD
Alexander van Hattem	Netherlands	Senate	PVV	VB–PVV
Ton van Kesteren	Netherlands	Senate	PVV	VB–PVV
Karl Vanlouwe	Belgium	Flemish Parliament	N-VA	CRD
Rachel van Meetelen	Netherlands	House of Representatives	PVV	VB–PVV
Elly van Wijk	Netherlands	Senate	BBB	CRD
Kris Verduykt	Belgium	Flemish Parliament	Vooruit	SGD
Marc Vervuurt	Netherlands	House of Representatives	D66	Liberal
Axel Weydts	Belgium	Chamber of Representatives	Vooruit	SGD
Vacancy	Netherlands	House of Representatives	GL–PvdA	SGD

== Meeting place ==
The meeting place of the Benelux Parliament rotates among Belgium, the Netherlands and Luxembourg. Each of these countries hosts the plenary meetings of the Benelux Parliament for two consecutive years. The secretariat of the Benelux Parliament is located in Brussels, Belgium.

Rotation scheme
Luxembourg	Belgium	Netherlands
2013–2014	2015–2016	2017–2018
2019–2020	2021–2022	2023–2024
2025–2026	2027–2028	2029–2030
