= Hainaut (Chamber of Representatives constituency) =

Parliamentary constituency in Belgium

- Henegouwen; Hennegau
- Constituency for the Chamber of Representatives
- Location of Hainaut within Belgium
- Province: Hainaut
- Region: Wallonia
- Population: 1,365,328 (2025)
- Electorate: 963,104 (2024)
- Area: 3,813 km^{2} (2024)

Current Constituency
- Created: 2003
- Seats: List: 17 (2024–present); 18 (2014–2024); 19 (2003–2014)
- Members: List: Hugues Bayet (PS); Georges-Louis Bouchez (MR); Hervé Cornillie (MR); Roberto d'Amico (PTB); Ludivine Dedonder (PS); Denis Ducarme (MR); Anthony Dufrane (MR); Jean-François Gatelier (LE); Paul Magnette (PS); Julien Matagne (LE); Sofie Merckx (PTB); Marie Meunier (PS); Patrick Prévot (PS); Julie Taton (MR); Éric Thiébaut (PS); Aurore Tourneur (LE); Ayşe Yiğit (PTB)
- Created from: List: Charleroi-Thuin; Mons-Soignies; Tournai-Ath-Mouscron

Hainaut (Dutch: Henegouwen; German: Hennegau) is one of the 11 multi-member constituencies of the Chamber of Representatives, the lower house of the Belgian Federal Parliament, the national legislature of Belgium. The constituency was established in 2003 following the re-organisation of constituencies across Belgium along provincial lines. It is conterminous with the province of Hainaut. The constituency currently elects 17 of the 150 members of the Chamber of Representatives using the open party-list proportional representation electoral system. At the 2024 federal election the constituency had 963,104 registered electors.

== Electoral system ==
Hainaut currently elects 17 of the 150 members of the Chamber of Representatives using the open party-list proportional representation electoral system. Seats are allocated using the D'Hondt method. Only parties that reach the 5% threshold in the constituency compete for seats.

Electors may vote for the list (party) or for individual candidates, either main candidates or substitute candidates or a combination, on the list. They may vote for as many candidates as there are seats in the constituency. Split-ticket voting (panachage) is not permitted and will result in the ballot paper being invalidated. The minimum number of votes a candidate must obtain to get elected - the quotient - is calculated as the total votes received by the party divided by the number of seats in the constituency plus one. Half the ballot papers where there are no votes for main candidates (i.e. the elector has voted for the list or for substitute candidates only) are redistributed amongst main candidates in the order they appear on the ballot paper so that the candidate's total votes (personal votes plus redistributed votes) equals the quotient. The seats won by the party are then allocated to the candidates with the most number of total votes.

== Election results ==
=== Summary ===
| Election | Workers PTB | | | Ecolo Ecolo | | | Socialists PS | | | Democratic Federalists DéFI / FDF | | | Reformists MR | | | Les Engagés LE / CDH | | | Chez Nous Chez Nous / PP | | | National Front FN | | |
| Election | Votes | % | Seats | Votes | % | Seats | Votes | % | Seats | Votes | % | Seats | Votes | % | Seats | Votes | % | Seats | Votes | % | Seats | Votes | % | Seats |
|---|---|---|---|---|---|---|---|---|---|---|---|---|---|---|---|---|---|---|---|---|---|---|---|---|
| 2024 | 103,339 | 13.97% | 3 | 36,750 | 4.97% | 0 | 213,501 | 28.86% | 6 | 15,189 | 2.05% | 0 | 192,759 | 26.05% | 5 | 114,559 | 15.48% | 3 | 22,039 | 2.98% | 0 | | | |
| 2019 | 114,243 | 15.64% | 3 | 89,898 | 12.30% | 3 | 250,146 | 34.24% | 8 | 27,484 | 3.76% | 0 | 116,528 | 15.95% | 3 | 58,695 | 8.03% | 1 | 24,719 | 3.38% | 0 | | | |
| 2014 | 38,194 | 5.17% | 1 | 43,488 | 5.89% | 1 | 303,085 | 41.04% | 9 | 14,382 | 1.95% | 0 | 153,301 | 20.76% | 5 | 76,812 | 10.40% | 2 | 32,158 | 4.35% | 0 | | | |
| 2010 | 12,136 | 1.68% | 0 | 67,993 | 9.41% | 2 | 348,184 | 48.18% | 11 | | | | 126,608 | 17.52% | 4 | 82,924 | 11.47% | 2 | 19,852 | 2.75% | 0 | 20,129 | 2.79% | 0 |
| 2007 | 6,376 | 0.86% | 0 | 78,777 | 10.61% | 2 | 254,070 | 34.23% | 7 | | | | 199,859 | 26.93% | 6 | 104,565 | 14.09% | 3 | | | | 58,408 | 7.87% | 1 |
| 2003 | 5,606 | 0.77% | 0 | 46,400 | 6.39% | 1 | 320,144 | 44.07% | 10 | | | | 159,487 | 21.96% | 5 | 87,975 | 12.11% | 2 | | | | 52,332 | 7.20% | 1 |

(Figures in italics represent alliances.)

=== Detailed ===
==== 2024 ====
Results of the 2024 federal election held on 9 June 2024:

| Party | | Votes per arrondissement | | | | | | | | | Total votes | % | Seats |
| Party | | Ath | Charle- roi | La Lou- vière | Mons | Mous- cron | Soig- nies | Thuin | Tournai | Expat- riates | Total votes | % | Seats |
|---|---|---|---|---|---|---|---|---|---|---|---|---|---|
| Socialist Party | PS | 18,413 | 67,685 | 23,287 | 43,669 | 7,644 | 15,339 | 12,497 | 22,496 | 2,471 | 213,501 | 28.86% | 6 |
| Reformist Movement | MR | 22,864 | 46,440 | 17,081 | 37,205 | 8,311 | 18,134 | 18,245 | 21,747 | 2,732 | 192,759 | 26.05% | 5 |
| Les Engagés | LE | 15,544 | 24,722 | 10,471 | 17,777 | 6,226 | 10,702 | 11,704 | 16,180 | 1,233 | 114,559 | 15.48% | 3 |
| Workers' Party of Belgium | PTB | 9,039 | 32,818 | 13,240 | 19,493 | 4,872 | 8,046 | 5,877 | 9,131 | 823 | 103,339 | 13.97% | 3 |
| Ecolo | Ecolo | 4,649 | 7,124 | 2,525 | 6,273 | 3,065 | 3,731 | 2,232 | 5,426 | 1,725 | 36,750 | 4.97% | 0 |
| Chez Nous | Chez Nous | 2,088 | 6,755 | 2,118 | 3,519 | 1,518 | 1,692 | 1,623 | 2,247 | 479 | 22,039 | 2.98% | 0 |
| DéFI | DéFI | 2,061 | 4,415 | 1,468 | 2,638 | 467 | 1,434 | 1,108 | 1,356 | 242 | 15,189 | 2.05% | 0 |
| New Flemish Alliance | N-VA | 2,082 | 3,772 | 1,370 | 2,116 | 908 | 1,106 | 943 | 1,587 | 300 | 14,184 | 1.92% | 0 |
| Blank Party | PB | 1,694 | 3,714 | 1,129 | 2,397 | 531 | 1,196 | 977 | 1,424 | 162 | 13,224 | 1.79% | 0 |
| Citizen Collective | CC | 729 | 2,292 | 650 | 1,040 | 300 | 661 | 633 | 624 | 272 | 7,201 | 0.97% | 0 |
| Workers' Struggle | LO | 408 | 1,386 | 559 | 770 | 332 | 326 | 297 | 442 | 160 | 4,680 | 0.63% | 0 |
| Belgische Unie – Union Belge | BUB | 350 | 693 | 251 | 388 | 141 | 160 | 125 | 213 | 105 | 2,426 | 0.33% | 0 |
| Valid votes | | 79,921 | 201,816 | 74,149 | 137,285 | 34,315 | 62,527 | 56,261 | 82,873 | 10,704 | 739,851 | 100.00% | 17 |
| Rejected votes | | 7,178 | 23,483 | 8,490 | 15,834 | 4,992 | 5,169 | 5,135 | 8,636 | 801 | 79,718 | 9.73% | |
| Total polled | | 87,099 | 225,299 | 82,639 | 153,119 | 39,307 | 67,696 | 61,396 | 91,509 | 11,505 | 819,569 | 85.10% | |
| Registered electors | | 98,482 | 268,470 | 96,008 | 180,947 | 44,288 | 77,152 | 70,998 | 105,070 | 21,689 | 963,104 | | |
| Turnout | | 88.44% | 83.92% | 86.08% | 84.62% | 88.75% | 87.74% | 86.48% | 87.09% | 53.05% | 85.10% | | |

The following candidates were elected: Hugues Bayet (PS), 9,016 votes; Georges-Louis Bouchez (MR), 79,447 votes; Hervé Cornillie (MR), 8,246 votes; Jean-Luc Crucke (LE), 32,308 votes; Roberto d'Amico (PTB), 6,078 votes; Ludivine Dedonder (PS), 29,525 votes; Denis Ducarme (MR), 19,205 votes; Anthony Dufrane (MR), 12,475 votes; Jean-François Gatelier (LE), 6,317 votes; Paul Magnette (PS), 90,198 votes; Sofie Merckx (PTB), 18,587 votes; Marie Meunier (PS), 9,478 votes; Patrick Prévot (PS), 9,798 votes; Julie Taton (MR), 23,633 votes; Éric Thiébaut (PS), 12,990 votes; Aurore Tourneur (LE), 11,015 votes; and Ayşe Yiğit (PTB), 5,531 votes.

Substitutions:

- Jean-Luc Crucke (LE) was appointed to the federal government and was substituted by Julien Matagne (LE) on 4 February 2025.

==== 2019 ====
Results of the 2019 federal election held on 26 May 2019:

| Party | | Votes per arrondissement | | | | | | | | | Total votes | % | Seats |
| Party | | Ath | Charle- roi | La Lou- vière | Mons | Mous- cron | Soig- nies | Thuin | Tournai | Expat- riates | Total votes | % | Seats |
|---|---|---|---|---|---|---|---|---|---|---|---|---|---|
| Socialist Party | PS | 23,290 | 71,003 | 29,734 | 57,188 | 8,318 | 18,589 | 15,468 | 26,302 | 254 | 250,146 | 34.24% | 8 |
| Reformist Movement | MR | 16,186 | 26,305 | 8,455 | 20,383 | 5,059 | 11,639 | 11,736 | 16,531 | 234 | 116,528 | 15.95% | 3 |
| Workers' Party of Belgium | PTB | 9,203 | 38,395 | 15,160 | 22,442 | 3,642 | 8,665 | 7,076 | 9,598 | 62 | 114,243 | 15.64% | 3 |
| Ecolo | Ecolo | 10,642 | 19,767 | 6,456 | 18,407 | 6,488 | 8,391 | 6,398 | 12,969 | 380 | 89,898 | 12.30% | 3 |
| Humanist Democratic Centre | CDH | 6,543 | 11,792 | 4,429 | 10,651 | 6,200 | 4,322 | 7,783 | 6,885 | 90 | 58,695 | 8.03% | 1 |
| DéFI | DéFI | 3,923 | 9,631 | 2,273 | 4,006 | 584 | 2,382 | 1,885 | 2,769 | 31 | 27,484 | 3.76% | 0 |
| People's Party | PP | 2,346 | 9,081 | 2,180 | 4,448 | 992 | 1,650 | 1,982 | 2,003 | 37 | 24,719 | 3.38% | 0 |
| Vlaams Belang | VB | 1,408 | 2,078 | 756 | 1,446 | 644 | 564 | 468 | 876 | 6 | 8,246 | 1.13% | 0 |
| Destexhe List | | 826 | 2,634 | 745 | 1,538 | 218 | 1,063 | 618 | 530 | 5 | 8,177 | 1.12% | 0 |
| Citizen Collective | CC | 1,641 | 1,860 | 679 | 1,493 | 729 | 518 | 436 | 630 | 6 | 7,992 | 1.09% | 0 |
| Agir | | 421 | 2,240 | 485 | 1,221 | 245 | 429 | 430 | 421 | 24 | 5,916 | 0.81% | 0 |
| The Right | | 379 | 2,169 | 579 | 1,249 | 278 | 410 | 366 | 480 | 6 | 5,916 | 0.81% | 0 |
| Workers' Struggle | LO | 528 | 1,634 | 791 | 1,187 | 333 | 406 | 366 | 486 | 4 | 5,735 | 0.78% | 0 |
| Nation | | 480 | 1,590 | 487 | 725 | 434 | 346 | 287 | 984 | 8 | 5,341 | 0.73% | 0 |
| Communist Party of Belgium | PCB | 109 | 702 | 196 | 274 | 58 | 93 | 91 | 98 | 5 | 1,626 | 0.22% | 0 |
| Valid votes | | 77,925 | 200,881 | 73,405 | 146,658 | 34,222 | 59,467 | 55,390 | 81,562 | 1,152 | 730,662 | 100.00% | 18 |
| Rejected votes | | 7,256 | 23,612 | 8,144 | 15,690 | 5,131 | 5,716 | 5,410 | 9,178 | 97 | 80,234 | 9.89% | |
| Total polled | | 85,181 | 224,493 | 81,549 | 162,348 | 39,353 | 65,183 | 60,800 | 90,740 | 1,249 | 810,896 | 86.01% | |
| Registered electors | | 96,112 | 265,624 | 94,020 | 192,359 | 44,507 | 74,113 | 69,701 | 104,602 | 1,751 | 942,789 | | |
| Turnout | | 88.63% | 84.52% | 86.74% | 84.40% | 88.42% | 87.95% | 87.23% | 86.75% | 71.33% | 86.01% | | |

The following candidates were elected: Hugues Bayet (PS), 14,387 votes; Roberto d'Amico (PTB), 4,552 votes; Ludivine Dedonder (PS), 16,663 votes; Elio Di Rupo (PS), 125,009 votes; Denis Ducarme (MR), 24,959 votes; Catherine Fonck (CDH), 19,333 votes; Marie-Colline Leroy (Ecolo), 8,410 votes; Marie-Christine Marghem (MR), 14,079 votes; Sofie Merckx (PTB), 8,912 votes; Jean-Marc Nollet (Ecolo), 16,676 votes; Özlem Özen (PS), 10,791 votes; Patrick Prévot (PS), 13,615 votes; Daniel Senesael (PS), 11,843 votes; Caroline Taquin (MR), 13,119 votes; Éric Thiébaut (PS), 14,791 votes; Marco Van Hees (PTB), 16,271 votes; Albert Vicaire (Ecolo), 2,818 votes; and Laurence Zanchetta (PS), 7,038 votes.

Substitutions:

- Jean-Marc Nollet (Ecolo) resigned on 18 September 2019 and was substituted by Laurence Hennuy (Ecolo) on 3 October 2019.
- Elio Di Rupo (PS) resigned on 19 September 2019 after he was appointed Minister-President of Wallonia and was substituted by Philippe Tison (PS).
- Ludivine Dedonder (PS) was appointed to the federal government and was substituted by Leslie Leoni (PS) on 1 October 2020.
- Marie-Colline Leroy (Ecolo) was appointed to the federal government and was substituted by Louis Mariage (Ecolo) on 11 May 2023.

==== 2014 ====
Results of the 2014 federal election held on 25 May 2014:

| Party | | Votes per arrondissement | | | | | | | | Total votes | % | Seats |
| Party | | Ath | Charle- roi | Mons | Mous- cron | Soig- nies | Thuin | Tournai | Expat- riates | Total votes | % | Seats |
|---|---|---|---|---|---|---|---|---|---|---|---|---|
| Socialist Party | PS | 22,060 | 91,258 | 67,292 | 11,871 | 41,047 | 36,544 | 32,565 | 448 | 303,085 | 41.04% | 9 |
| Reformist Movement | MR | 14,341 | 40,413 | 25,452 | 6,816 | 23,430 | 20,337 | 22,257 | 255 | 153,301 | 20.76% | 5 |
| Humanist Democratic Centre | CDH | 5,398 | 18,210 | 13,957 | 8,300 | 11,178 | 10,254 | 9,423 | 92 | 76,812 | 10.40% | 2 |
| Ecolo | Ecolo | 3,387 | 11,389 | 7,929 | 2,957 | 6,776 | 4,516 | 6,405 | 129 | 43,488 | 5.89% | 1 |
| Workers' Party of Belgium | PTB | 1,455 | 16,031 | 7,377 | 811 | 5,984 | 4,075 | 2,443 | 18 | 38,194 | 5.17% | 1 |
| People's Party | PP | 1,945 | 13,753 | 5,549 | 754 | 4,054 | 4,279 | 1,795 | 29 | 32,158 | 4.35% | 0 |
| Debout Les Belges! | | 960 | 10,225 | 6,444 | 582 | 2,677 | 2,205 | 1,513 | 28 | 24,634 | 3.34% | 0 |
| Make Way Clear | | 573 | 5,729 | 3,410 | 649 | 2,164 | 1,799 | 1,132 | 11 | 15,467 | 2.09% | 0 |
| Francophone Democratic Federalists | FDF | 947 | 5,101 | 2,755 | 417 | 2,290 | 1,659 | 1,198 | 15 | 14,382 | 1.95% | 0 |
| The Right | | 382 | 2,265 | 1,265 | 427 | 822 | 920 | 704 | 19 | 6,804 | 0.92% | 0 |
| Pirate | | 406 | 1,376 | 1,085 | 352 | 1,123 | 513 | 1,044 | 8 | 5,907 | 0.80% | 0 |
| Wallonia First | | 279 | 1,928 | 902 | 256 | 613 | 507 | 428 | 13 | 4,926 | 0.67% | 0 |
| Nation | | 157 | 1,192 | 560 | 251 | 520 | 294 | 789 | 4 | 3,767 | 0.51% | 0 |
| Workers' Struggle | LO | 186 | 1,129 | 734 | 204 | 577 | 388 | 320 | 1 | 3,539 | 0.48% | 0 |
| Anti-Sharia Party | P+ | 73 | 947 | 718 | 34 | 186 | 195 | 97 | 4 | 2,254 | 0.31% | 0 |
| Rassemblement Wallonie France | RWF | 113 | 729 | 410 | 46 | 295 | 304 | 158 | 3 | 2,058 | 0.28% | 0 |
| New Alternative Wallonia | NWA | 77 | 681 | 298 | 66 | 154 | 277 | 117 | 3 | 1,673 | 0.23% | 0 |
| Left Movement | MG | 155 | 568 | 241 | 63 | 178 | 196 | 257 | 4 | 1,662 | 0.23% | 0 |
| Walloon Front | FW | 62 | 920 | 202 | 69 | 142 | 150 | 85 | 3 | 1,633 | 0.22% | 0 |
| Walloon Rally | RW | 139 | 561 | 330 | 59 | 133 | 221 | 143 | 12 | 1,598 | 0.22% | 0 |
| Belgische Unie – Union Belge | BUB | 36 | 199 | 147 | 37 | 134 | 67 | 64 | 4 | 688 | 0.09% | 0 |
| General Movement of Young; Disadvantaged Workers | MGJOD | 30 | 192 | 82 | 21 | 48 | 45 | 42 | 0 | 460 | 0.06% | 0 |
| Valid votes | | 53,161 | 224,796 | 147,139 | 35,042 | 104,525 | 89,745 | 82,979 | 1,103 | 738,490 | 100.00% | 18 |
| Rejected votes | | 4,468 | 22,852 | 14,432 | 5,062 | 9,354 | 8,258 | 8,695 | 101 | 73,222 | 9.02% | |
| Total polled | | 57,629 | 247,648 | 161,571 | 40,104 | 113,879 | 98,003 | 91,674 | 1,204 | 811,712 | 87.59% | |
| Registered electors | | 64,208 | 286,339 | 186,435 | 44,866 | 128,479 | 110,451 | 104,404 | 1,550 | 926,732 | | |
| Turnout | | 89.75% | 86.49% | 86.66% | 89.39% | 88.64% | 88.73% | 87.81% | 77.68% | 87.59% | | |

The following candidates were elected: Philippe Blanchart (PS), 8,860 votes; Christian Brotcorne (CDH), 8,700 votes; Olivier Chastel (MR), 41,921 votes; Paul-Olivier Delannois (PS), 8,271 votes; Laurent Devin (PS), 12,889 votes; Elio Di Rupo (PS), 181,964 votes; Denis Ducarme (MR), 15,142 votes; Jean-Jacques Flahaux (MR), 8,061 votes; Catherine Fonck (CDH), 24,645 votes; Benoît Friart (MR), 8,597 votes; Marie-Christine Marghem (MR), 21,088 votes; Éric Massin (PS), 12,935 votes; Jean-Marc Nollet (Ecolo), 7,936 votes; Özlem Özen (PS), 11,961 votes; Daniel Senesael (PS), 16,113 votes; Éric Thiébaut (PS), 12,935 votes; Marco Van Hees (PTB), 5,488 votes; and Fabienne Winckel (PS), 8,899 votes.

Substitutions:

- Marie-Christine Marghem (MR) was appointed to the federal government and was substituted by Richard Miller (MR) on 14 October 2014.

==== 2010 ====
Results of the 2010 federal election held on 13 June 2010:

| Party | | Votes per arrondissement | | | | | | | | Total votes | % | Seats |
| Party | | Ath | Charle- roi | Mons | Mous- cron | Soig- nies | Thuin | Tournai | Expat- riates | Total votes | % | Seats |
|---|---|---|---|---|---|---|---|---|---|---|---|---|
| Socialist Party | PS | 24,302 | 110,505 | 78,015 | 11,890 | 46,240 | 41,490 | 35,509 | 233 | 348,184 | 48.18% | 11 |
| Reformist Movement | MR | 12,078 | 31,658 | 21,396 | 5,561 | 20,474 | 16,315 | 18,983 | 143 | 126,608 | 17.52% | 4 |
| Humanist Democratic Centre | CDH | 5,555 | 23,295 | 12,460 | 8,399 | 11,648 | 11,131 | 10,346 | 90 | 82,924 | 11.47% | 2 |
| Ecolo | Ecolo | 4,694 | 19,782 | 10,874 | 5,003 | 10,365 | 7,414 | 9,698 | 163 | 67,993 | 9.41% | 2 |
| National Front | FN | 1,019 | 8,582 | 3,462 | 928 | 2,378 | 2,044 | 1,707 | 9 | 20,129 | 2.79% | 0 |
| People's Party | PP | 1,302 | 8,086 | 2,681 | 647 | 3,130 | 2,494 | 1,495 | 17 | 19,852 | 2.75% | 0 |
| Wallonia First | | 883 | 4,795 | 2,297 | 960 | 1,724 | 1,558 | 1,536 | 42 | 13,795 | 1.91% | 0 |
| Workers' Party of Belgium | PTB | 660 | 4,770 | 2,533 | 402 | 2,147 | 1,046 | 570 | 8 | 12,136 | 1.68% | 0 |
| National Front+ | FN+ | 527 | 4,962 | 2,021 | 557 | 1,292 | 1,258 | 934 | 2 | 11,553 | 1.60% | 0 |
| Rassemblement Wallonie France | RWF | 573 | 4,622 | 1,901 | 318 | 1,512 | 1,538 | 938 | 12 | 11,414 | 1.58% | 0 |
| Left Front | | 259 | 1,888 | 1,211 | 238 | 835 | 559 | 445 | 7 | 5,442 | 0.75% | 0 |
| Wallon+ | W+ | 155 | 620 | 269 | 77 | 218 | 183 | 156 | 1 | 1,679 | 0.23% | 0 |
| Socialist Movement Plus | | 46 | 247 | 163 | 38 | 121 | 358 | 57 | 1 | 1,031 | 0.14% | 0 |
| Valid votes | | 52,053 | 223,812 | 139,283 | 35,018 | 102,084 | 87,388 | 82,374 | 728 | 722,740 | 100.00% | 19 |
| Rejected votes | | 3,874 | 21,236 | 11,269 | 4,756 | 8,340 | 7,641 | 7,932 | 60 | 65,108 | 8.26% | |
| Total polled | | 55,927 | 245,048 | 150,552 | 39,774 | 110,424 | 95,029 | 90,306 | 788 | 787,848 | 87.61% | |
| Registered electors | | 62,313 | 282,449 | 173,611 | 44,637 | 124,995 | 107,563 | 102,861 | 859 | 899,288 | | |
| Turnout | | 89.75% | 86.76% | 86.72% | 89.11% | 88.34% | 88.35% | 87.79% | 91.73% | 87.61% | | |

The following candidates were elected: Ronny Balcaen (Ecolo), 2,298 votes; Philippe Blanchart (PS), 9,774 votes; Juliette Boulet (Ecolo), 7,192 votes; Christian Brotcorne (CDH), 8,665 votes; Colette Burgeon (PS), 11,828 votes; Olivier Chastel (MR), 30,868 votes; Rudy Demotte (PS), 38,702 votes; Laurent Devin (PS), 12,599 votes; Elio Di Rupo (PS), 203,758 votes; Denis Ducarme (MR), 10,578 votes; Anthony Dufrane (PS), 9,195 votes; Catherine Fonck (CDH), 22,482 votes; Jacqueline Galant (MR), 18,256 votes; Marie-Christine Marghem (MR), 13,559 votes; Patrick Moriau (PS), 15,867 votes; Özlem Özen (PS), 9,687 votes; Franco Seminara (PS), 6,684 votes; Éric Thiébaut (PS), 16,307 votes; and Christiane Vienne (PS), 12,191 votes.

Substitutions:

- Rudy Demotte (PS) resigned on 18 June 2010 and was substituted by Olivier Henry (PS) on 6 July 2010.
- Elio Di Rupo (PS) was appointed Prime Minister of Belgium and was substituted by Bruno Van Grootenbrulle (PS) between 7 December 2011 and 9 January 2013; by Laurence Meire (PS) between 10 January 2013 and 17 September 2013; and by Manuella Senecaut (PS) from 17 September 2013.
- Olivier Chastel (MR) was appointed to the federal government and was substituted by Olivier Destrebecq (MR) on 7 December 2011.
- Anthony Dufrane (PS) resigned on 3 January 2013 and was substituted by Bruno Van Grootenbrulle (PS).
- Patrick Moriau (PS) died on 20 July 2013 and was substituted by Laurence Meire (PS) on 17 September 2013.

==== 2007 ====
Results of the 2007 federal election held on 10 June 2007:

| Party | | Votes per arrondissement | | | | | | | | Total votes | % | Seats |
| Party | | Ath | Charle- roi | Mons | Mous- cron | Soig- nies | Thuin | Tournai | Expat- riates | Total votes | % | Seats |
|---|---|---|---|---|---|---|---|---|---|---|---|---|
| Socialist Party | PS | 19,448 | 74,066 | 59,556 | 10,311 | 34,513 | 28,327 | 27,504 | 345 | 254,070 | 34.23% | 7 |
| Reformist Movement | MR | 16,943 | 57,264 | 34,886 | 8,633 | 30,289 | 24,977 | 26,581 | 286 | 199,859 | 26.93% | 6 |
| Humanist Democratic Centre | CDH | 6,402 | 30,832 | 18,251 | 8,637 | 13,525 | 14,535 | 12,256 | 127 | 104,565 | 14.09% | 3 |
| Ecolo | Ecolo | 4,607 | 25,209 | 14,152 | 4,771 | 10,614 | 9,331 | 9,878 | 215 | 78,777 | 10.61% | 2 |
| National Front | FN | 2,592 | 24,331 | 11,437 | 2,574 | 6,754 | 6,487 | 4,209 | 24 | 58,408 | 7.87% | 1 |
| Communist Party of Wallonia | PC | 598 | 3,628 | 1,950 | 647 | 1,516 | 1,038 | 1,264 | 13 | 10,654 | 1.44% | 0 |
| Rassemblement Wallonie France | RWF | 715 | 3,297 | 2,049 | 316 | 1,121 | 1,428 | 870 | 9 | 9,805 | 1.32% | 0 |
| Workers' Party of Belgium | PTB | 126 | 2,923 | 1,136 | 77 | 1,524 | 427 | 159 | 4 | 6,376 | 0.86% | 0 |
| Wallon | | 142 | 1,349 | 522 | 207 | 467 | 525 | 255 | 31 | 3,498 | 0.47% | 0 |
| Walloon Party | | 128 | 1,150 | 517 | 122 | 475 | 487 | 245 | 15 | 3,139 | 0.42% | 0 |
| National Force (Belgium) | | 130 | 1,221 | 535 | 142 | 350 | 324 | 218 | 8 | 2,928 | 0.39% | 0 |
| Vivant | | 138 | 1,050 | 346 | 124 | 355 | 192 | 348 | 8 | 2,561 | 0.35% | 0 |
| Federal Christian Democrats | CDF | 157 | 721 | 495 | 142 | 344 | 254 | 345 | 7 | 2,465 | 0.33% | 0 |
| New Belgian Front | FNB | 111 | 954 | 404 | 124 | 271 | 276 | 214 | 1 | 2,355 | 0.32% | 0 |
| Committee for Another Policy | CAP | 104 | 360 | 415 | 50 | 227 | 108 | 160 | 10 | 1,434 | 0.19% | 0 |
| Union | | 37 | 377 | 136 | 44 | 91 | 90 | 81 | 0 | 856 | 0.12% | 0 |
| Rights and Freedoms of Citizens | DLC | 21 | 111 | 134 | 13 | 119 | 36 | 27 | 3 | 464 | 0.06% | 0 |
| Valid votes | | 52,399 | 228,843 | 146,921 | 36,934 | 102,555 | 88,842 | 84,614 | 1,106 | 742,214 | 100.00% | 19 |
| Rejected votes | | 3,845 | 20,806 | 11,512 | 4,952 | 8,222 | 7,570 | 7,962 | 117 | 64,986 | 8.05% | |
| Total polled | | 56,244 | 249,649 | 158,433 | 41,886 | 110,777 | 96,412 | 92,576 | 1,223 | 807,200 | 89.75% | |
| Registered electors | | 61,066 | 280,807 | 179,094 | 45,698 | 122,479 | 106,083 | 102,749 | 1,380 | 899,356 | | |
| Turnout | | 92.10% | 88.90% | 88.46% | 91.66% | 90.45% | 90.88% | 90.10% | 88.62% | 89.75% | | |

The following candidates were elected: Marie Arena (PS), 20,187 votes; Juliette Boulet (Ecolo), 4,843 votes; Christian Brotcorne (CDH), 11,330 votes; Colette Burgeon (PS), 9,105 votes; Olivier Chastel (MR), 67,180 votes; Patrick Cocriamont (FN), 9,448 votes; Jean-Luc Crucke (MR), 15,406 votes; Rudy Demotte (PS), 28,807 votes; Elio Di Rupo (PS), 138,276 votes; Denis Ducarme (MR), 11,393 votes; Christian Dupont (PS), 11,387 votes; Jean-Jacques Flahaux (MR), 9,156 votes; Catherine Fonck (CDH), 25,685 votes; Jacqueline Galant (MR), 21,743 votes; Marie-Christine Marghem (MR), 18,479 votes; Patrick Moriau (PS), 14,908 votes; Jean-Marc Nollet (Ecolo), 20,362 votes; Véronique Salvi (CDH), 14,647 votes; and Éric Thiébaut (PS), 9,965 votes.

Substitutions:

- Marie Arena (PS) resigned after she was appointed Minister-President of the French Community and was substituted by Camille Dieu (PS) between 5 July 2007 and 19 July 2007; and by Bruno Van Grootenbrulle (PS) between 9 October 2007 and 20 March 2008.
- Elio Di Rupo (PS) resigned after he was appointed Minister-President of Wallonia and was substituted by Bruno Van Grootenbrulle (PS) between 5 July 2007 and 20 July 2007.
- Catherine Fonck (CDH) was appointed to the Government of the French Community and was substituted by David Lavaux (CDH) between 5 July 2007 and 24 June 2009; and by Hélène Couplet-Clément (CDH) between 2 July 2009 and 16 July 2009.
- Rudy Demotte (PS) resigned after he was appointed Minister-President of Wallonia and Minister-President of the French Community and was substituted by Camille Dieu (PS) between 9 October 2007 and 24 June 2009.
- Olivier Chastel (MR) was appointed Secretary of State in the federal government and was substituted by Olivier Destrebecq (MR) between 20 March 2008 and 24 June 2009; and by Françoise Colinia (MR) from 2 July 2019.
- Marie Arena (PS) was appointed to the federal government and was substituted by Bruno Van Grootenbrulle (PS) between 22 March 2008 and 24 June 2009; and by Isabelle Privé (PS) between 25 June 2009 and 16 July 2009.
- Jean-Luc Crucke (MR) resigned on 23 June 2009 and was substituted by Olivier Destrebecq (MR) on 25 June 2009.
- Rudy Demotte (PS) resigned on 23 June 2009 and was substituted by Camille Dieu (PS) on 25 June 2009.
- Elio Di Rupo (PS) resigned on 23 June 2009 and was substituted by Bruno Van Grootenbrulle (PS) on 25 June 2009.
- Christian Dupont (PS) resigned on 23 June 2009 and was substituted by Philippe Blanchart (PS) on 25 June 2009.
- Véronique Salvi (CDH) resigned on 23 June 2009 and was substituted by David Lavaux (CDH) on 25 June 2009.
- Jean-Marc Nollet (Ecolo) was appointed to the Government of Wallonia and was substituted by Ronny Balcaen (Ecolo) on 16 July 2009.

==== 2003 ====
Results of the 2003 federal election held on 18 May 2003:

| Party | | Votes per arrondissement | | | | | | | | Total votes | % | Seats |
| Party | | Ath | Charle- roi | Mons | Mous- cron | Soig- nies | Thuin | Tournai | Expat- riates | Total votes | % | Seats |
|---|---|---|---|---|---|---|---|---|---|---|---|---|
| Socialist Party | PS | 25,369 | 100,976 | 69,759 | 10,810 | 44,130 | 35,019 | 33,780 | 301 | 320,144 | 44.07% | 10 |
| Reformist Movement | MR | 13,025 | 43,785 | 28,771 | 6,674 | 24,126 | 21,339 | 21,502 | 265 | 159,487 | 21.96% | 5 |
| Humanist Democratic Centre | CDH | 4,821 | 23,705 | 15,528 | 9,580 | 11,402 | 11,101 | 11,729 | 109 | 87,975 | 12.11% | 2 |
| National Front | FN | 2,404 | 22,716 | 10,138 | 2,433 | 5,895 | 5,170 | 3,552 | 24 | 52,332 | 7.20% | 1 |
| Ecolo | Ecolo | 2,523 | 13,492 | 9,366 | 3,793 | 6,056 | 4,596 | 6,395 | 179 | 46,400 | 6.39% | 1 |
| Rassemblement Wallonie France | RWF | 605 | 3,194 | 1,942 | 452 | 1,138 | 1,570 | 1,103 | 22 | 10,026 | 1.38% | 0 |
| Vivant | Vivant | 490 | 4,145 | 1,116 | 578 | 1,089 | 690 | 966 | 18 | 9,092 | 1.25% | 0 |
| Federal Christian Democrats | CDF | 555 | 2,219 | 1,225 | 373 | 1,066 | 1,369 | 1,451 | 40 | 8,298 | 1.14% | 0 |
| Vlaams Blok | VB | 541 | 1,565 | 1,144 | 742 | 1,051 | 567 | 578 | 10 | 6,198 | 0.85% | 0 |
| Communist Party of Wallonia | PC | 216 | 2,043 | 1,333 | 223 | 850 | 452 | 483 | 9 | 5,609 | 0.77% | 0 |
| Workers' Party of Belgium | PTB | 150 | 2,897 | 1,019 | 128 | 713 | 425 | 266 | 8 | 5,606 | 0.77% | 0 |
| Socialist Movement | MS | 64 | 382 | 277 | 38 | 330 | 3,242 | 82 | 1 | 4,416 | 0.61% | 0 |
| New Belgian Front | FNB | 155 | 1,335 | 545 | 459 | 428 | 382 | 343 | 1 | 3,648 | 0.50% | 0 |
| Nation | | 117 | 1,116 | 415 | 474 | 280 | 225 | 468 | 5 | 3,100 | 0.43% | 0 |
| French People United in a National; Action of Co-operation and Emancipation | FRANCE | 150 | 848 | 722 | 199 | 477 | 277 | 353 | 9 | 3,035 | 0.42% | 0 |
| Liberal Challenge | DL | 67 | 535 | 153 | 51 | 88 | 94 | 58 | 6 | 1,052 | 0.14% | 0 |
| Valid votes | | 51,252 | 224,953 | 143,453 | 37,007 | 99,119 | 86,518 | 83,109 | 1,007 | 726,418 | 100.00% | 19 |
| Rejected votes | | 3,962 | 20,721 | 12,871 | 5,253 | 8,400 | 7,734 | 9,417 | 184 | 68,542 | 8.62% | |
| Total polled | | 55,214 | 245,674 | 156,324 | 42,260 | 107,519 | 94,252 | 92,526 | 1,191 | 794,960 | 90.18% | |
| Registered electors | | 59,628 | 275,559 | 176,422 | 45,641 | 117,767 | 103,000 | 102,258 | 1,294 | 881,569 | | |
| Turnout | | 92.60% | 89.15% | 88.61% | 92.59% | 91.30% | 91.51% | 90.48% | 92.04% | 90.18% | | |

The following candidates were elected: Marie Arena (PS), 40,747 votes; Chantal Bertouille (MR), 11,671 votes; Colette Burgeon (PS), 10,282 votes; Olivier Chastel (MR), 22,133 votes; Anne-Marie Corbisier-Hagon (CDH), 12,361 votes; Rudy Demotte (PS), 35,384 votes; Camille Dieu (PS), 7,645 votes; Elio Di Rupo (PS), 151,964 votes; Daniel Féret (FN), 8,739 votes; Jacqueline Galant (MR), 11,849 votes; Hervé Hasquin (MR), 28,531 votes; Jean-Pol Henry (PS), 8,667 votes; Marie-Christine Marghem (MR), 9,926 votes; Éric Massin (PS), 6,275 votes; Patrick Moriau (PS), 22,952 votes; Jean-Marc Nollet (Ecolo), 8,564 votes; Sophie Pécriaux (PS), 8,368 votes; Annick Saudoyer (PS), 8,128 votes; and Jean-Jacques Viseur (CDH), 17,660 votes.

Substitutions:

- Chantal Bertouille (MR) resigned on 21 May 2003 and was substituted by Denis Ducarme (MR).
- Anne-Marie Corbisier-Hagon (CDH) resigned on 3 June 2003 and was substituted by Catherine Fonck (CDH).
- Marie Arena (PS) was appointed to the Government of Wallonia and was substituted by Bruno Van Grootenbrulle (PS) between 26 June 2003 and 13 July 2003.
- Hervé Hasquin (MR) resigned after he was appointed Minister-President of Wallonia and was substituted by Françoise Colinia (MR) between 26 June 2003 and 30 June 2004; and by Alex Tromont (MR) between 8 July 2004 and 18 July 2004.
- Jean-Marc Nollet (Ecolo) was appointed to the Government of the French Community and was substituted by Gérard Gobert (Ecolo) between 26 June 2003 and 18 July 2004.
- Marie Arena (PS) was appointed to the federal government and was substituted by Bruno Van Grootenbrulle (PS) between 14 July 2003 and 18 July 2004.
- Rudy Demotte (PS) was appointed to the federal government and was substituted by Alisson De Clercq (PS) between 14 July 2003 and 18 July 2004.
- Olivier Chastel (MR) was appointed to the Government of the French Community and was substituted by Jean-Luc Crucke (MR) between 19 February 2004 and 28 June 2004; and by Robert Hondermarcq (MR) between 1 July 2004 and 18 July 2004.
- Daniel Féret (FN) resigned on 29 June 2004 and was substituted by Patrick Cocriamont (FN) on 1 July 2004.
- Rudy Demotte (PS) resigned on 19 July 2004 and was substituted by Bruno Van Grootenbrulle (PS) on 21 July 2004.
- Marie Arena (PS) resigned after she was appointed Minister-President of the French Community and was substituted by Alisson De Clercq (PS) from 21 July 2004.
- Catherine Fonck (CDH) was appointed to the Government of the French Community and was substituted by Damien Yzerbyt (CDH) between 30 July 2004 and 19 April 2005; and by David Lavaux (CDH) from 21 April 2005.
- Elio Di Rupo (PS) resigned after he was appointed Minister-President of Wallonia and was substituted by Yvon Harmegnies (PS) on 11 October 2005.
