= Hervé Cornillie =

Belgian politician (born 1979)

Member of the Chamber of Representatives
- Incumbent
- Assumed office 10 July 2024
- Constituency: Hainaut

Member of the Parliament of Wallonia
- In office 16 September 2019 – 13 January 2022
- Preceded by: Jean-Luc Crucke
- Succeeded by: Jean-Luc Crucke
- Constituency: Tournai-Ath-Mouscron

Personal details
- Born: 7 October 1979 (age 46)
- Party: Reformist Movement

Hervé Cornillie (born 7 October 1979) is a Belgian politician of the Reformist Movement serving as a member of the Chamber of Representatives since 2024. From 2019 to 2022, he was a member of the Parliament of Wallonia.
