= List of protected heritage sites in Estinnes =

This table shows an overview of the protected heritage sites in the Walloon town Estinnes. This list is part of Belgium's national heritage.

Object	Year/architect	Town/section	Address	Coordinates	Number^{?}	Image
Chapel of Our Lady of Cambron ^{(nl)} ^{(fr)}		Estinnes	Estinnes-au-Mont	50.402581°N 4.101536°E	56085-CLT-0001-01 Info	Kapel Notre-Dame de Cambron
St. Martin's Church and walls ^{(nl)} ^{(fr)}		Estinnes	Estinnes-au-Val	50.411738°N 4.104304°E	56085-CLT-0002-01 Info	Kerk Saint-Martin en ommuring
Site formed by the spot "Le Mas" ^{(nl)} ^{(fr)}		Estinnes	Rouveroy	50.351356°N 4.031907°E	56085-CLT-0003-01 Info	
Parts of the thirteenth to the eighteenth century of the seminar Bonne Esperance ^{(nl)} ^{(fr)}		Estinnes	Vellereille-les-Brayeux	50.386163°N 4.141982°E	56085-CLT-0005-01 Info	Delen uit de dertiende tot de achttiende eeuw van de seminarie Bonne Espérance
The facades and roofs and the surrounding wall of the farm and the ensemble of the farm and the nearby church (Saint-Martin) ^{(nl)} ^{(fr)}		Estinnes	rue A. Brogniez n°6, Estinnes	50.351452°N 4.119499°E	56085-CLT-0009-01 Info	De gevels en daken en de omliggende muur van de boerderij en het ensemble van de boerderij en de nabijgelegen kerk (Saint-Martin)
The totality of the church of Saint-Remi ^{(nl)} ^{(fr)}		Estinnes	Estinnes	50.357446°N 4.065003°E	56085-CLT-0010-01 Info	
Ensemble of the buildings of the old abbey of Good Hope ('Bonne Esperance'), including the abbey farm ^{(nl)} ^{(fr)}		Estinnes		50.386163°N 4.141982°E	56085-PEX-0001-01 Info	Ensemble van de gebouwen van de oude abdij van de Goede Hoop ('Bonne-Espérance'), met inbegrip van de abdijhoeve

== See also ==
- List of protected heritage sites in Hainaut (province)
- Estinnes
