= Roberto d'Amico (politician) =

Belgian politician (born 1967)

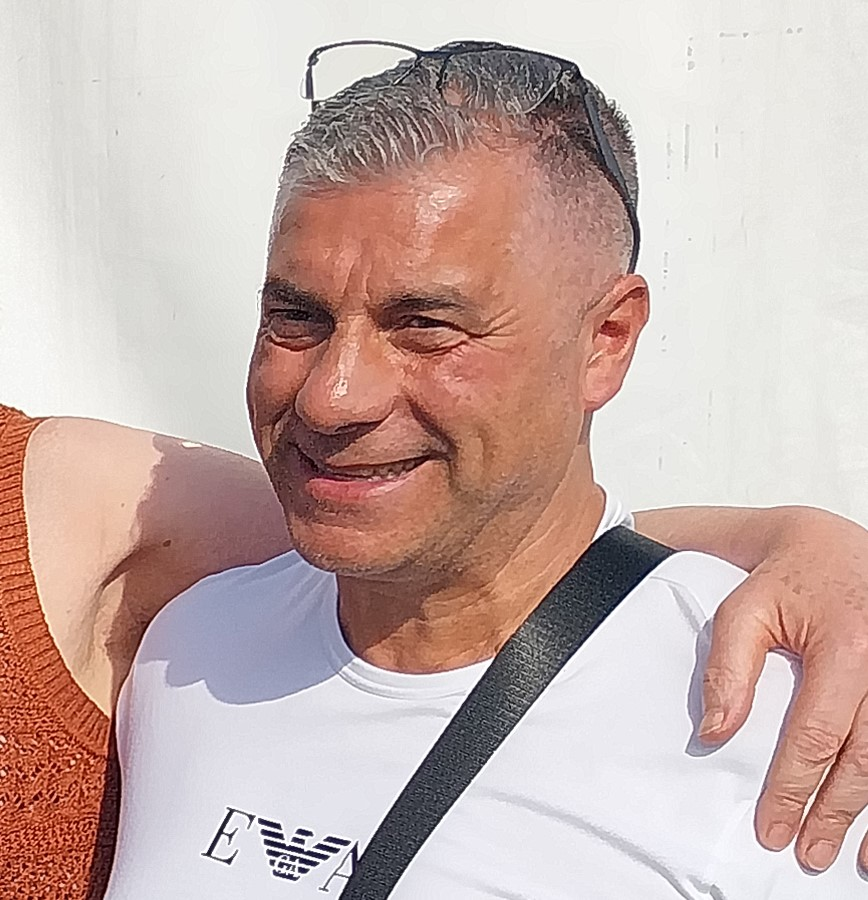
- D'Amico in September 2023

Member of the Chamber of Representatives
- Incumbent
- Assumed office 20 June 2019
- Constituency: Hainaut

Personal details
- Born: 7 May 1967 (age 58) Charleroi, Belgium
- Party: Workers' Party of Belgium

Roberto d'Amico (born 7 May 1967) is a Belgian trade unionist, politician and member of the Chamber of Representatives. A member of the Workers' Party of Belgium, he has represented Hainaut since June 2019.

D'Amico was born on 7 May 1967 in Charleroi. He studied computer science at university before dropping out. He then worked for Caterpillar in Gosselies as an electrician for over three decades. He was encouraged by his father, a communist, to join a trade union. He became active in trade union activities and was a General Labour Federation of Belgium (FGTB) official at the Caterpillar factory. After the Caterpillar factory closed, D'Amico worked as a social worker for two years.

D'Amico was elected to the municipal council in Charleroi at the 2018 local election. He was elected to the Chamber of Representatives at the 2019 federal election. He was re-elected at the 2024 federal election.

Electoral history of Roberto d'Amico
Election	Constituency	Party	Votes	Result
2018 local	Charleroi	Workers' Party of Belgium	677	Elected
2019 federal	Hainaut	Workers' Party of Belgium	4,552	Elected
2024 federal	Hainaut	Workers' Party of Belgium	6,078	Elected
