= Sofie Merckx =

Belgian politician (born 1974)

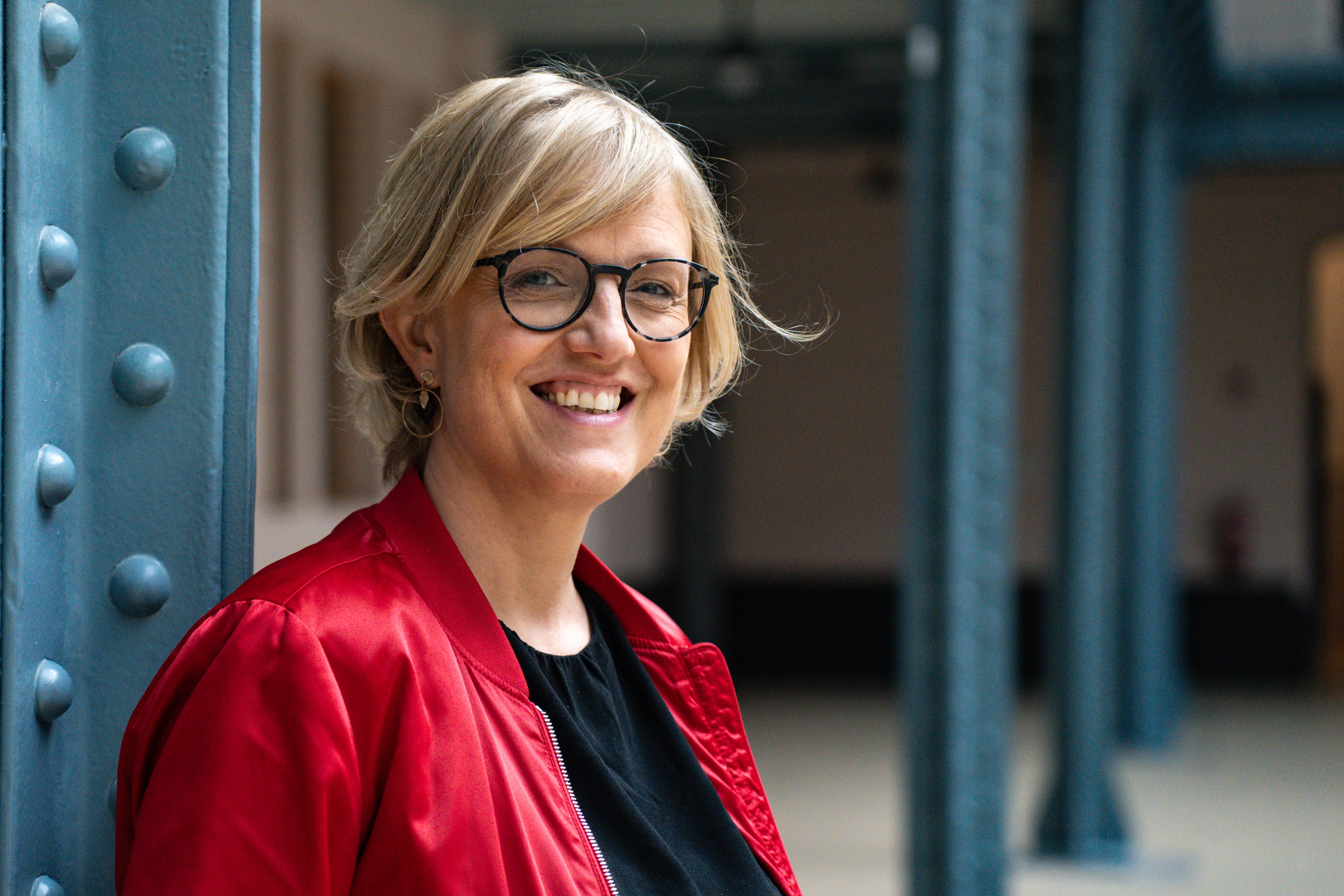
- Merckx in May 2024

Member of the Chamber of Representatives
- Incumbent
- Assumed office 20 June 2019
- Constituency: Hainaut

Personal details
- Born: 14 November 1974 (age 51) Wilrijk, Belgium
- Party: Workers' Party of Belgium
- Education: University of Antwerp; Université libre de Bruxelles

Sofie J. E. Merckx (born 14 November 1974) is a Belgian physician, politician and member of the Chamber of Representatives. A member of the Workers' Party of Belgium, she has represented Hainaut since June 2019.

Merckx was born on 14 November 1974 in Wilrijk. She grew up in the Hoboken neighbourhood of Antwerp and Dutch is her mother tongue. Her father Kris Merckx, a general practitioner and a communist, was one of the founders of the All Power to the Workers (AMADA), the precursor to the Workers' Party of Belgium (PTB), and Medics for the People (MPLP). She studied medicine at the University of Antwerp and the Université libre de Bruxelles. She moved to Charleroi in Wallonia in the late 1990s for her internship with MPLP. She has lived in Wallonia since then and has worked as a general practitioner at the MPLP's health centre in Marcinelle.

Merckx was elected to the municipal council in Charleroi at the 2012 local election. She was re-elected at the 2018 local election. She was elected to the Chamber of Representatives at the 2019 federal election. In January 2022 she succeeded Raoul Hedebouw as the PTB's group leader in the Chamber of Representatives. She was re-elected at the 2024 federal election.

Merckx has three children.

Electoral history of Sofie Merckx
Election	Constituency	Party	Votes	Result
2012 local	Charleroi	Workers' Party of Belgium	1,187	Elected
2018 local	Charleroi	Workers' Party of Belgium	4,163	Elected
2019 federal	Hainaut	Workers' Party of Belgium	8,912	Elected
2024 federal	Hainaut	Workers' Party of Belgium	18,587	Elected
