= Jean-François Gatelier =

Belgian politician (born 1971)

Member of the Chamber of Representatives
- Incumbent
- Assumed office 10 July 2024
- Constituency: Hainaut

Personal details
- Born: 31 January 1971 (age 55)
- Party: Les Engagés

Jean-François Gatelier (born 31 January 1971) is a Belgian politician serving as a member of the Chamber of Representatives since 2024. He has served as mayor of Sivry-Rance since 2006.
