= Croix-lez-Rouveroy =

Village in Estinnes, Wallonia, Belgium

Coordinates: 50.36152°N 4.07692°E

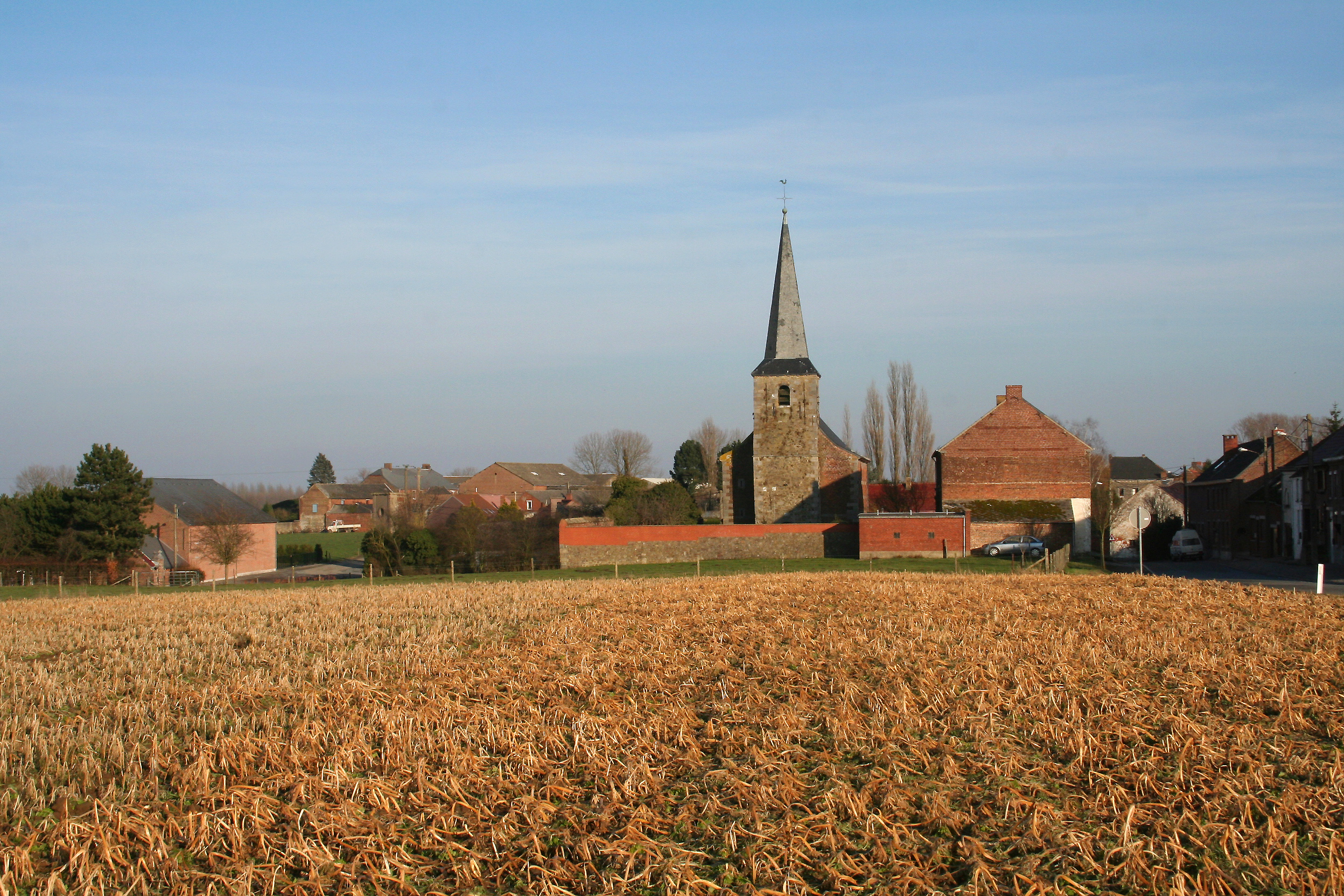
A view of Croix-lez-Rouveroy

Croix-lez-Rouveroy (French pronunciation: [kʁwa le ʁuvʁwa], lit. 'Croix near Rouveroy'; Picard: Èl Crwè) is a village of Wallonia and a district of the municipality of Estinnes, located in the province of Hainaut.

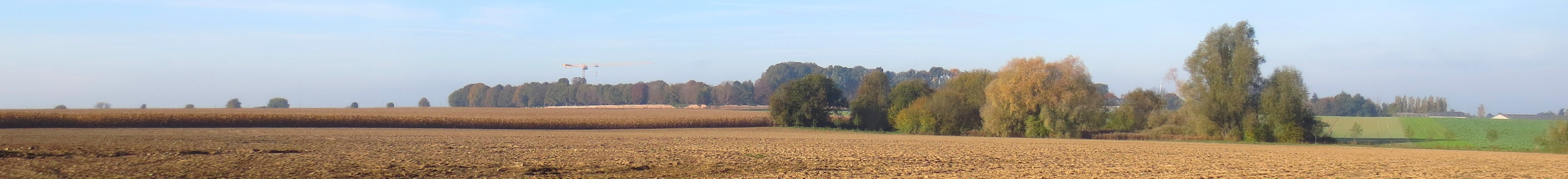
Panorama of Croix-lez-Rouveroy
