= Pim van Ballekom =

Dutch politician

- Pim van Ballekom in 2017

Member of the Senate
- Incumbent
- Assumed office 11 June 2019

Personal details
- Born: Wilhelmus Thomas van Ballekom; 2 December 1954 (age 71) Best, Netherlands
- Party: VVD
- Children: 2
- Education: Leiden University

Wilhelmus Thomas "Pim" van Ballekom (born 2 December 1954) is a Dutch politician, who is a member of the People's Party for Freedom and Democracy (VVD). He has been a member of the Dutch Senate since 11 June 2019.

== Biography ==
Van Ballekom was born on 2 December 1954 in Best. He attended secondary school at the Sint-Joris College in Eindhoven, and subsequently obtained both a bachelor's degree in law, and a master's degree in political science at Leiden University. Van Ballekom then worked at the Permanent Representation of the Kingdom of the Netherlands to the European Union and the Dutch Ministry of Finance. From 1997 to 2001, he was a member of the executive board of the European Bank for Reconstruction and Development. Between 2001 and 2004, he was deputy head of the cabinet of European Commissioner Frits Bolkestein, and from 2004 to 2006, he was a special advisor to the European Commission.

From 2006 to 2010, Van Ballekom was head of the finance department of the Permanent Representation of the Kingdom of the Netherlands to the European Union. He then worked as director of International Relations at the Algemene Pensioengroep for two years. Between 2012 and 2018, Van Ballekom was vice-president of the European Investment Bank. On 11 June 2019, he was sworn in as a member of the Senate for the People's Party for Freedom and Democracy (VVD). He served as president of the Benelux Parliament from 17 March 2023 to 1 January 2025.

== Personal life ==
Van Ballekom is married and has two children; a daughter and a son.
