= Éric Thiébaut =

Belgian politician (born 1969)

Member of the Chamber of Representatives
- Incumbent
- Assumed office 28 June 2007
- Constituency: Hainaut

Personal details
- Born: 30 June 1969 (age 56)
- Party: Socialist Party

Éric Thiébaut (born 30 June 1969) is a Belgian politician of the Socialist Party serving as a member of the Chamber of Representatives since 2007. He has served as mayor of Hensies since 2001.
