= Marie Meunier =

Belgian politician (born 1992)

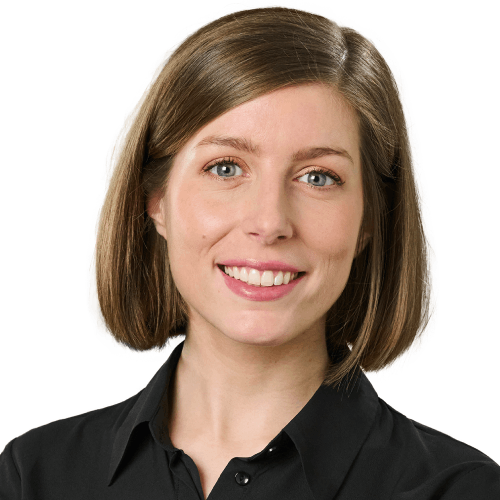

Member of the Chamber of Representatives
- Incumbent
- Assumed office 10 July 2024
- Constituency: Hainaut

Personal details
- Born: 11 April 1992 (age 34)
- Party: Socialist Party

Marie Meunier (born 11 April 1992) is a Belgian politician of the Socialist Party serving as a member of the Chamber of Representatives since 2024. Until 2024, she was the head of the Public Centre for Social Welfare of Mons.
