= Colette Burgeon =

Belgian politician (born 1957)

Collette Burgeon
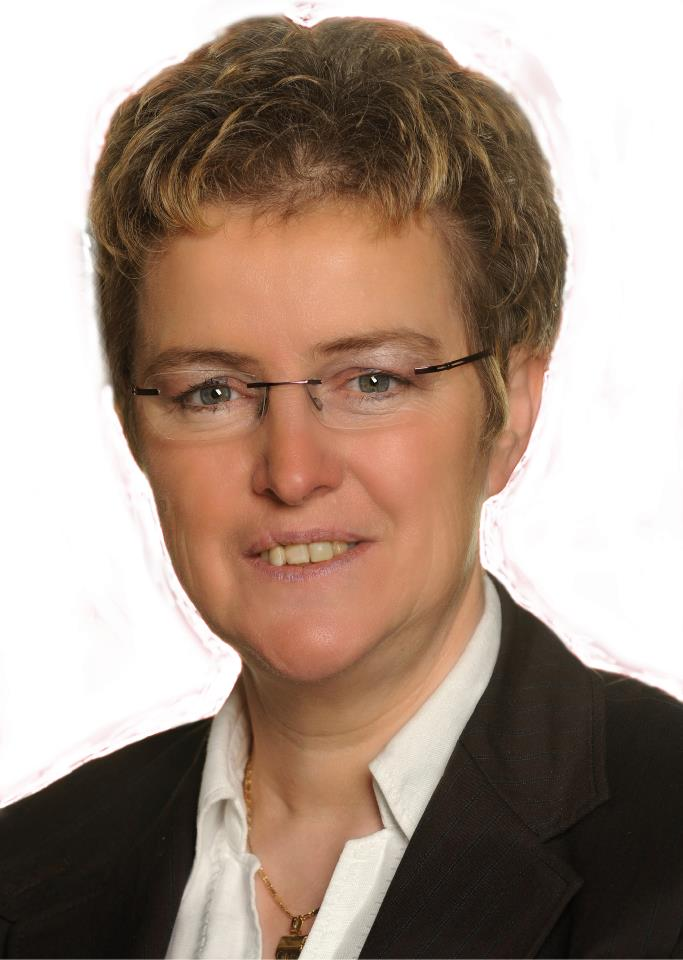

Member of the Chamber of Representatives of Belgium
- In office 1985–2014

Member of the Walloon Regional Council
- In office 1985–1995

Personal details
- Born: 11 February 1957 (age 69) Hainaut, Belgium
- Party: Parti Socialiste

Colette Burgeon (born 11 February 1957 in Hainaut, Belgium) is a Belgian politician and member of the Parti Socialiste. She is the sister of Willy Burgeon.

== Career ==
Burgeon served from 1985 to 1995 on the Walloon Regional Council. She was a member of the Chamber of Representatives from 1985 to 1995 for Soignies, from 1995 to 2003 for Mons-Soignies, and from 2003 to 2014 for Hainaut. Burgeon was the Second Vice-President of the Chamber from 2007 to 2010, and has also been the commissioner for gender equality in the Belgian Parliament.
