= Ayşe Yiğit =

Belgian politician (born 1972)

Member of the Chamber of Representatives
- Incumbent
- Assumed office 9 June 2024
- Constituency: Hainaut

Member of the Senate
- In office 2019–2024

Personal details
- Born: 1 October 1972 (age 54) Çaykara, Turkey
- Party: Workers' Party of Belgium
- Education: Ege University

Ayşe Yiğit (born 1 October 1972) is a Belgian politician and member of the Chamber of Representatives. A member of the Workers' Party of Belgium, she has represented Hainaut since June 2024. She had previously been a member of the Senate from 2019 to 2024.

Yiğit was born on 1 October 1972 in Taşlıgedik, Çaykara, Turkey. Her father Niyazi Yiğit migrated to Limburg in the mid-1980s to teach and later brought his family to Belgium. Yiğit then returned to Turkey to finish her education, graduating with a degree in communication sciences and journalism from Ege University. She settled in Belgium permanently in 1998. She is a translator and interpreter and has worked for Babel Vlaamse Tolkentelefoon, Flemish Integration Agency.

Yiğit joined the Workers' Party of Belgium (PTB) in 2015 and was active in its women's wing, Marianne (now Zelle). She contested the 2018 local election as the PTB's first placed candidate for the municipal council in Houthalen-Helchteren but the party failed to win any seats in the municipality. She contested the 2019 federal election as the PTB's first placed candidate in Limburg but the party failed to win any seats in the constituency. She was co-opted to the Senate in July 2019. She was elected to the Chamber of Representatives at the 2024 federal election.

Yiğit has a daughter and son.

Electoral history of Ayşe Yiğit
Election	Constituency	Party	Votes	Result
2018 local	Houthalen-Helchteren	Workers' Party of Belgium	207	Not elected
2019 federal	Limburg	Workers' Party of Belgium	8,604	Not elected
2024 federal	Hainaut	Workers' Party of Belgium	5,531	Elected
