= Aurore Tourneur =

Belgian politician (born 1980)

Member of the Chamber of Representatives
- Incumbent
- Assumed office 10 July 2024
- Constituency: Hainaut

Personal details
- Born: 22 June 1980 (age 45)
- Party: Les Engagés

Aurore Tourneur (born 22 June 1980) is a Belgian politician serving as a member of the Chamber of Representatives since 2024. She has served as mayor of Estinnes since 2012.

== See also ==
- List of members of the Chamber of Representatives of Belgium, 2024–
