= Hensies =

Municipality in Hainaut Province, Wallonia, Belgium

Hensies Hinzi (Picard)
- Municipality
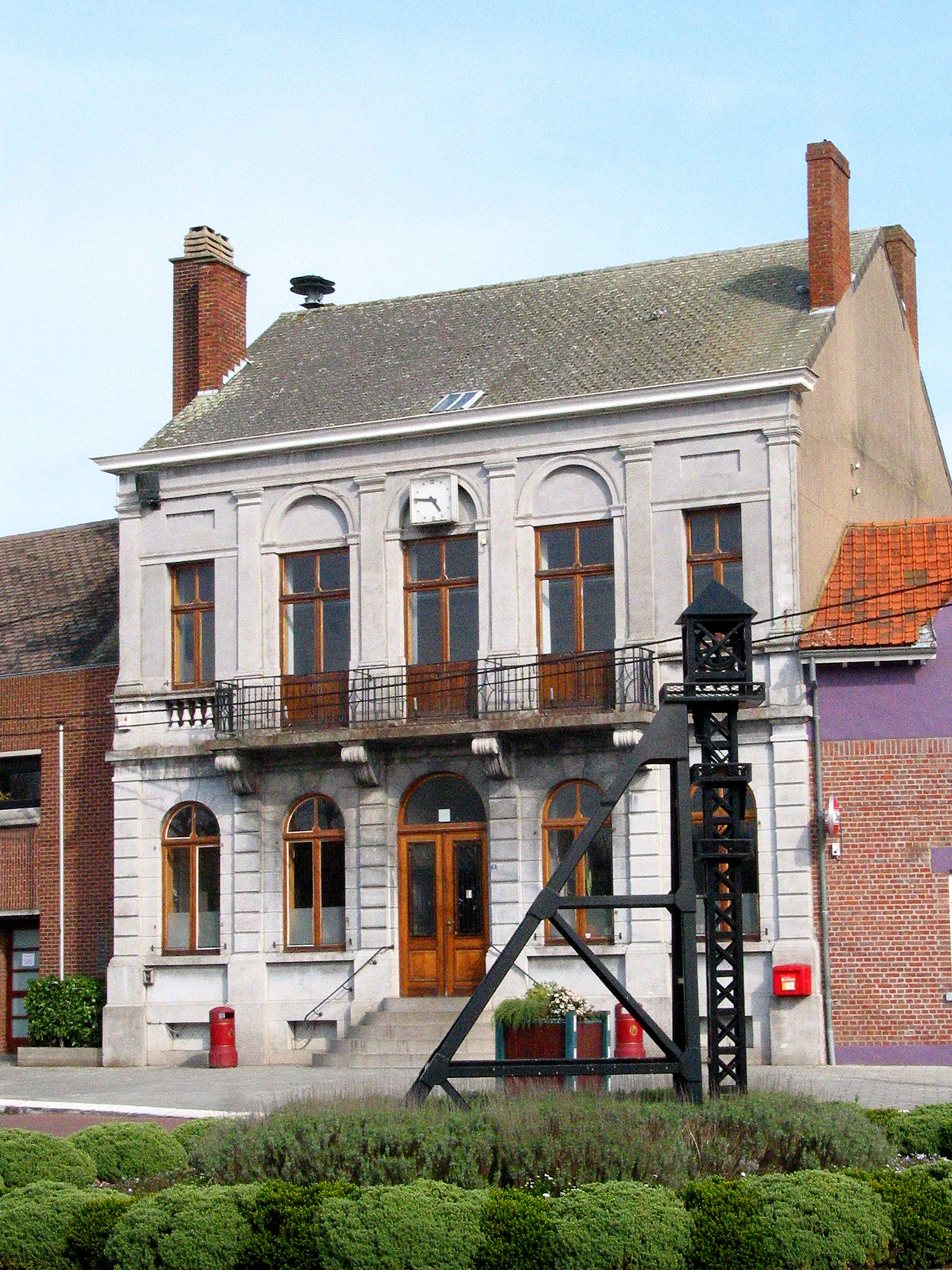
- Hensies town hall

- Flag Coat of arms

- Location of Hensies in Hainaut
- Interactive map of Hensies
- Location in Belgium
- Coordinates: 50°26′N 03°40′E
- Country: Belgium
- Community: French Community
- Region: Wallonia
- Province: Hainaut
- Arrondissement: Mons

Government
  - Mayor: Éric Thiébaut (PS) (Équipe du Bourgmestre)
  - Governing party: Équipe du Bourgmestre (PS + cdH)

Area
  - Total: 26.41 km^{2} (10.20 sq mi)

Population (2018-01-01)
  - Total: 6,828
  - Density: 258.5/km^{2} (669.6/sq mi)
- Postal codes: 7350
- NIS code: 53039
- Area codes: 065
- Website: www.hensies.be

Hensies (French pronunciation: [ɑ̃zi]; Picard: Hinzi; Walloon: Inzî) is a municipality of Wallonia located in the province of Hainaut, Belgium.

It has 6,857 inhabitants, as of January 1, 2017. The total area is 25.99 km^{2}, giving a population density of 258 inhabitants per km^{2}.

The municipality consists of the following districts: Hainin, Hensies, Montrœul-sur-Haine, and Thulin.

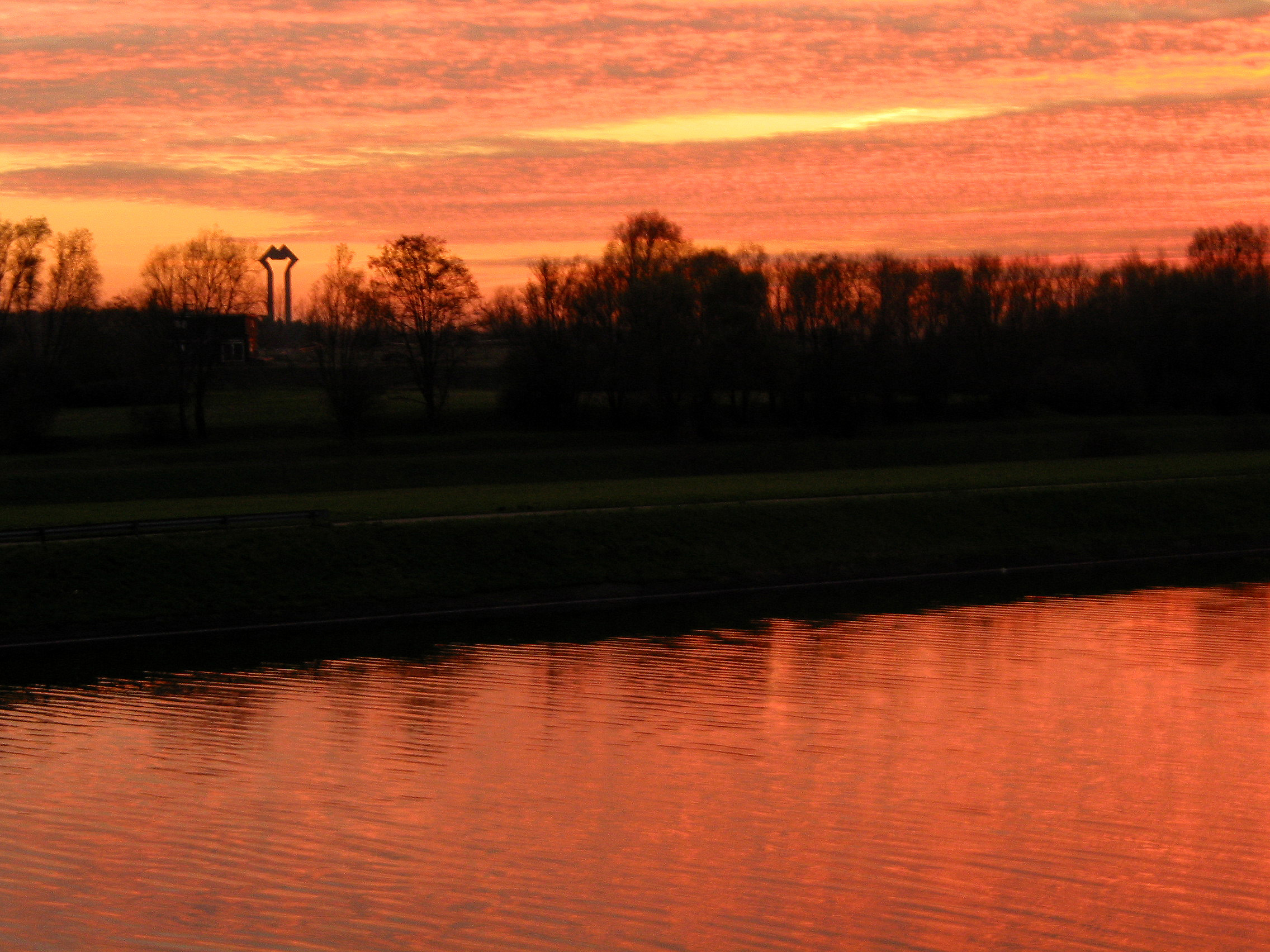
Hensies: the Pommeroeul-Condé canal at sunset
