= Barbara Agostino =

Luxembourgish politician (born 1982)

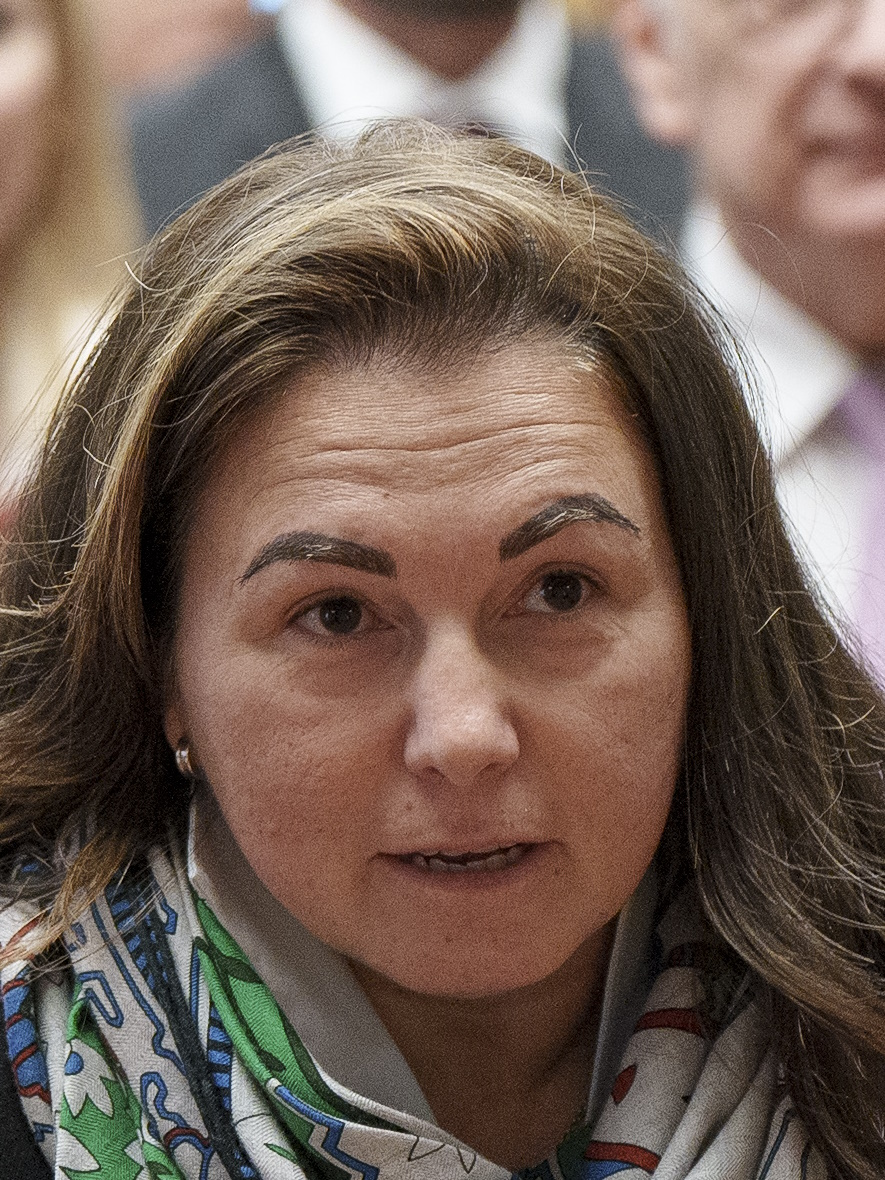
- Agostino in 2023

Member of the Benelux Parliament
- Incumbent
- Assumed office 21 November 2023
- Parliamentary group: Liberal

Member of the Chamber of Deputies
- Incumbent
- Assumed office 21 November 2023
- Preceded by: Herself
- Constituency: South

Member of the Chamber of Deputies
- In office 27 June 2023 – 24 October 2023
- Preceded by: Max Hahn
- Succeeded by: Herself
- Constituency: South

Personal details
- Born: 6 July 1982 (age 44) Esch-sur-Alzette, Luxembourg
- Party: Democratic Party (DP)
- Domestic partner: Tilly Metz
- Occupation: Politician; entrepreneur; footballer

Barbara Agostino (born 6 July 1982) is a Luxembourgish entrepreneur, former footballer and politician from the Democratic Party (DP). She has been a member of the Chamber of Deputies and the Benelux Parliament since 2023.

== Early and personal life ==
The daughter of Italian immigrants, Agostino was in a relationship with Green MEP Tilly Metz.
