= Marco Van Hees =

Belgian politician (born 1964)

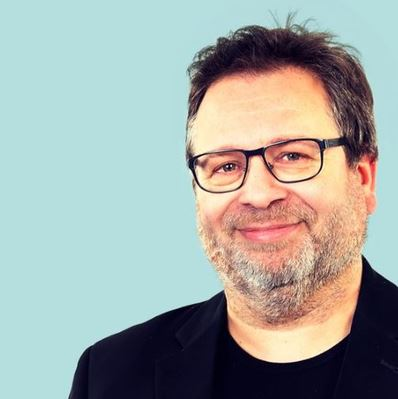

Member of the Chamber of Representatives
- In office 19 June 2014 – 27 May 2024
- Constituency: Hainaut

Personal details
- Born: 15 March 1964 (age 62) Berchem-Sainte-Agathe, Belgium
- Party: Workers' Party of Belgium
- Education: Université libre de Bruxelles

Marco G. Van Hees (born 15 March 1964) is a Belgian tax specialist, politician and former member of the Chamber of Representatives. A member of the Workers' Party of Belgium, he represented Hainaut from June 2014 to May 2024.

Van Hees was born on 15 March 1964 in Berchem-Sainte-Agathe. He has degree in political sciences from the Université libre de Bruxelles. He worked briefly for ASLK/CGER before becoming a civil servant at Federal Public Service Finance. He was also a trade union representative for the General Labour Federation of Belgium (FGTB). He was a journalist at Solidaire, the Workers' Party of Belgium (PTB)'s magazine, for many years and has written several books.

Van Hees contested the 2010 federal election as the PTB's first placed candidate in the French speaking electoral college but the party failed to win any seats in the Senate electoral college. He was elected to the Chamber of Representatives at the 2014 federal election. He was re-elected at the 2024 federal election He contested the 2024 federal election as the PTB's 17th placed candidate in Hainaut but was not re-elected.

Van Hees lives in Morlanwelz and has two children. He plays the guitar in a band called Flying Shoes.

Electoral history of Marco Van Hees
Election	Constituency	Party	Votes	Result
2010 federal	French speaking	Workers' Party of Belgium	7,405	Not elected
2014 federal	Hainaut	Workers' Party of Belgium	5,488	Elected
2019 federal	Hainaut	Workers' Party of Belgium	16,271	Elected
2024 federal	Hainaut	Workers' Party of Belgium	3,404	Not elected

== Works ==
- La fortune des Boël: un énorme patrimoine, une immense dette sociale [The fortune of the Boëls: A huge heritage, a huge social debt] (in French). Brussels, Belgium: Éditions Aden. 2006. ISBN 9782930402352.
- Didier Reynders: l'homme qui parle à l'oreille des riches [Didier Reynders: The man who whispers in the ears of the rich] (in French). Brussels, Belgium: Éditions Aden. 2007. ISBN 9782930402451.
- Le Frankenstein fiscal du Dr Reynders : tout ce que vous n'auriez jamais dû savoir sur les intérêts notionnels [Dr. Reynders' Fiscal Frankenstein: Everything You Never Should Have Known About Notional Interest] (in French). Brussels, Belgium: Éditions Aden. 2008. ISBN 9782930402710.
- Banques qui pillent, banques qui pleurent: enquête sur les profits et crises des banques belges [Banks that plunder, banks that cry: Investigation into Belgian bank profits and crises] (in French). Brussels, Belgium: Éditions Aden. 2010. ISBN 9782805900419.
- Les riches aussi ont le droit de payer des impôts [The rich too, have the right to pay taxes] (in French). Brussels, Belgium: Éditions Aden. 2013. ISBN 9782805920417.
- —— & Reyniers, Jan (2013). Belastingparadijs België [Tax haven Belgium] (in Dutch). Antwerp, Belgium: EPO. ISBN 9789491297571.
