= Estinnes =

Municipality in Hainaut Province, Wallonia, Belgium

Estinnes L' Estene (Picard)
- Municipality
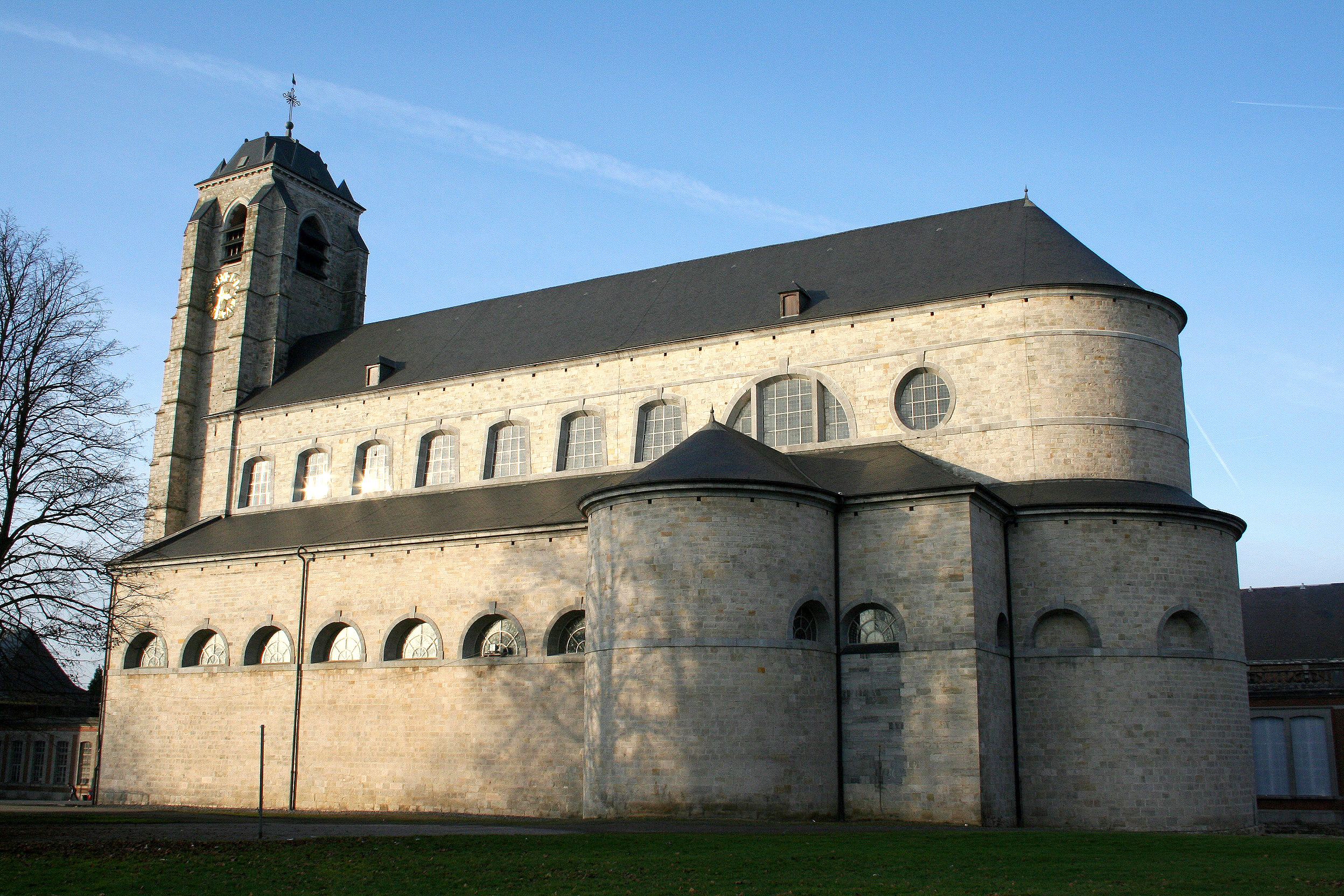
- Basilica of Notre-Dame de Bonne-Espérance

- Flag Coat of arms

- Location of Estinnes in Hainaut
- Interactive map of Estinnes
- Location in Belgium
- Coordinates: 50°24′N 04°06′E
- Country: Belgium
- Community: French Community
- Region: Wallonia
- Province: Hainaut
- Arrondissement: La Louvière

Government
  - Mayor: Aurore Tourneur
  - Governing parties: EMC, cdH, MR

Area
  - Total: 73.29 km^{2} (28.30 sq mi)

Population (2018-01-01)
  - Total: 7,715
  - Density: 105.3/km^{2} (272.6/sq mi)
- Postal codes: 7120
- NIS code: 58003
- Area codes: 064
- Website: www.estinnes.be

Estinnes (French pronunciation: [ɛstin]; Picard: L' Estene) is a municipality of Wallonia located in the province of Hainaut, Belgium.

On 1 January 2006, Estinnes had a total population of 7,413. The total area is 72.73 km^{2} which gives a population density of 102 inhabitants per km^{2}.

The municipality consists of the following districts: Croix-lez-Rouveroy, Estinnes-au-Mont, Estinnes-au-Val, Faurœulx, Haulchin, Peissant, Rouveroy, Vellereille-les-Brayeux, and Vellereille-le-Sec.

Estinnes was the location, on 1 March 744, of the second reform council organized by Saint Boniface.

Near Estinnes is a wind farm with 11 wind turbines of Enercon E-126 type, 198.5 metres (651 ft) high.

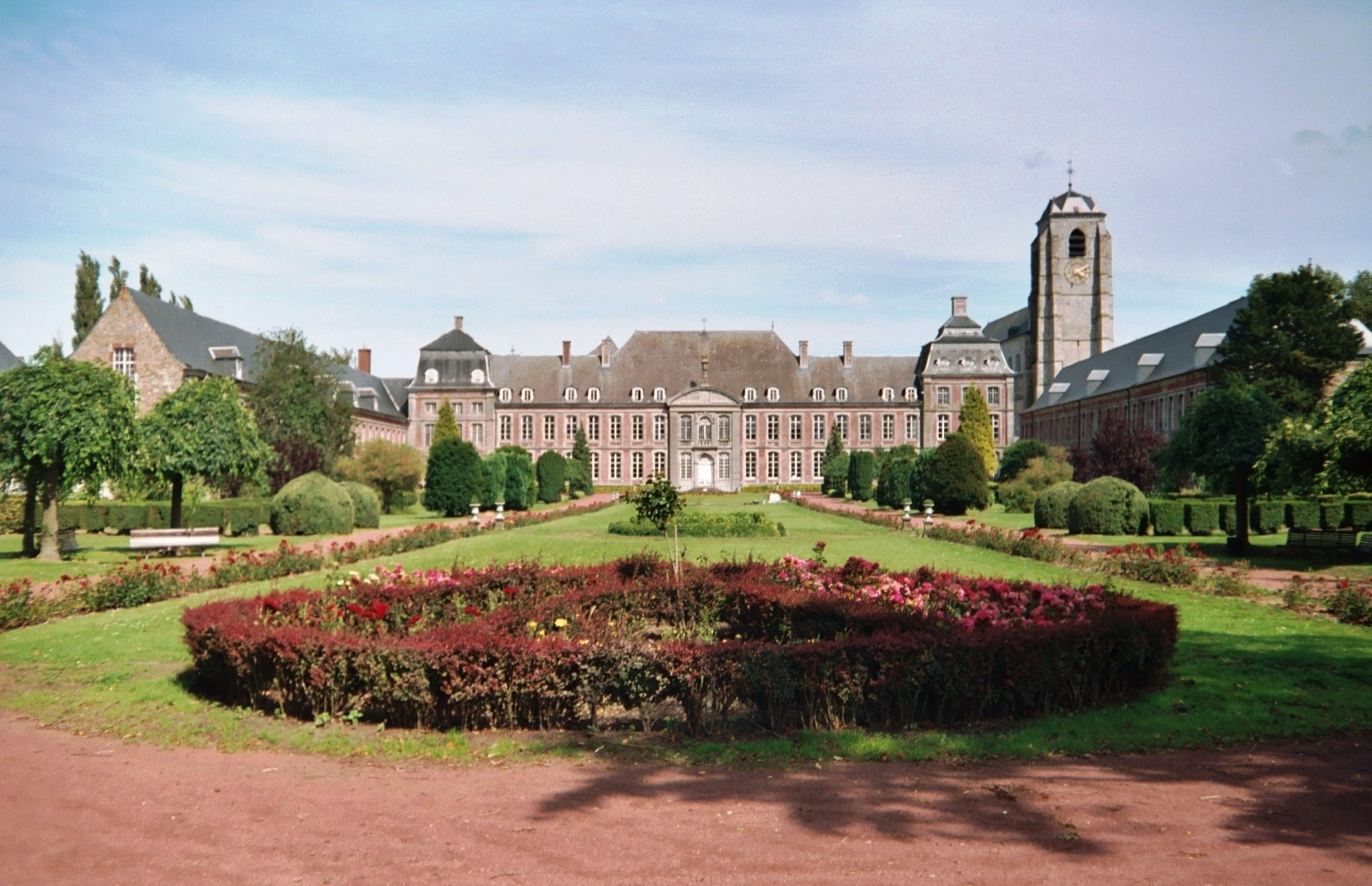
View of Bonne-Espérance Abbey (1130), in Estinnes (Vellereille-les-Brayeux)
