= Hugues Bayet =

Belgian politician

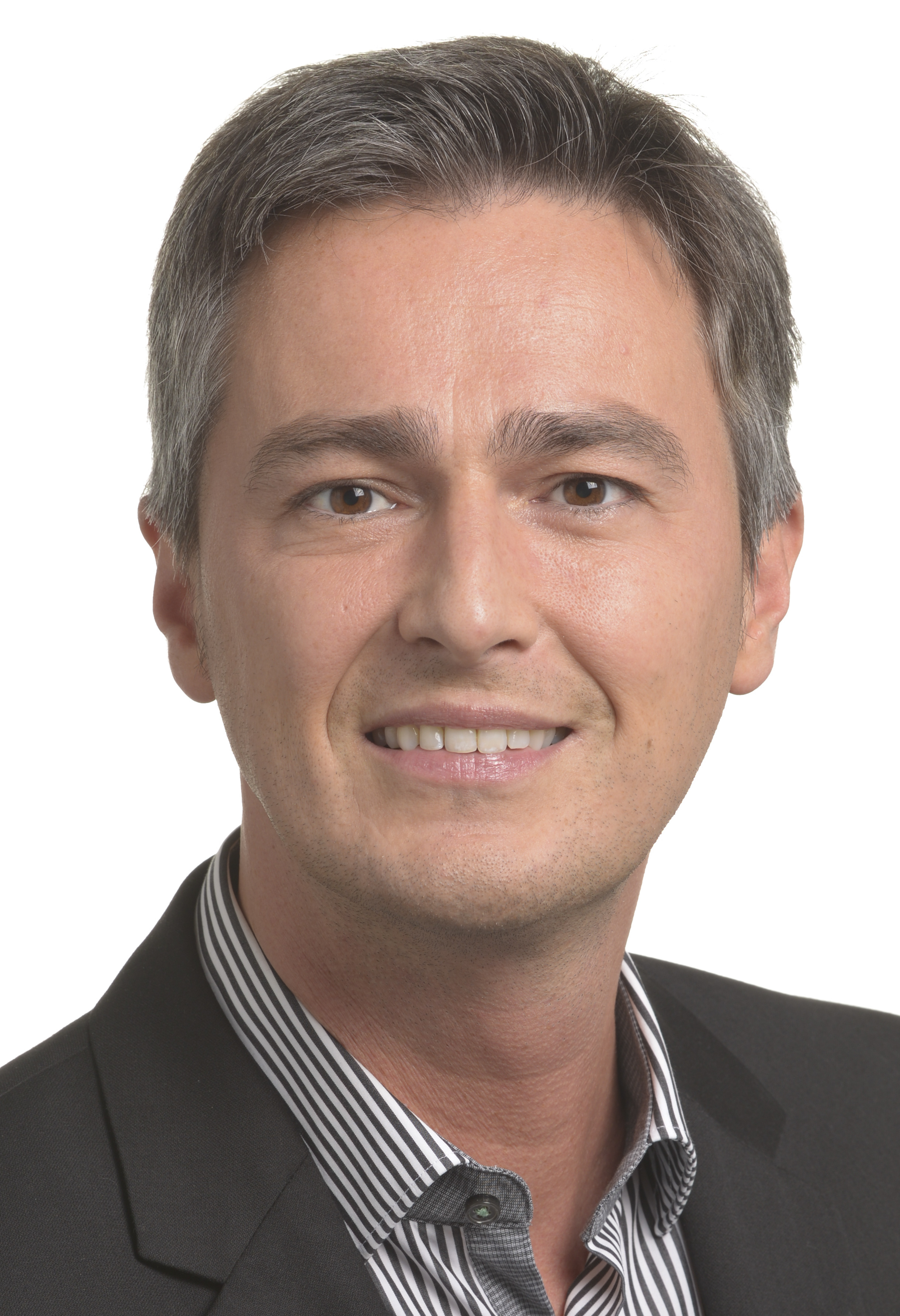

Member of the European Parliament
- In office 1 July 2014 – 2019
- Constituency: Belgian French-speaking electoral college

Personal details
- Born: 12 April 1975 (age 50) Farciennes, Belgium
- Party: Socialist Party
- Occupation: Politician

Hugues Bayet is a Belgian politician of the Socialist Party. He is a former Member of the European Parliament and the mayor of Farciennes.

Since the 2014 European elections, Bayet has been a Member of the European Parliament, representing the Belgian French-speaking electoral college. He has since been serving on the Committee on Economic and Monetary Affairs. From 2015 until 2016, he was a member of the Special Committee on Tax Rulings and Other Measures Similar in Nature or Effect (TAXE). In 2016, he joined the Parliament's Committee of Inquiry into Money Laundering, Tax Avoidance and Tax Evasion (PANA) that investigated the Panama Papers revelations and tax avoidance schemes more broadly.

Bayet was elected to the Belgian Federal Parliament in the 2024 Belgian federal election.
