= Jan Schoonis =

Dutch politician

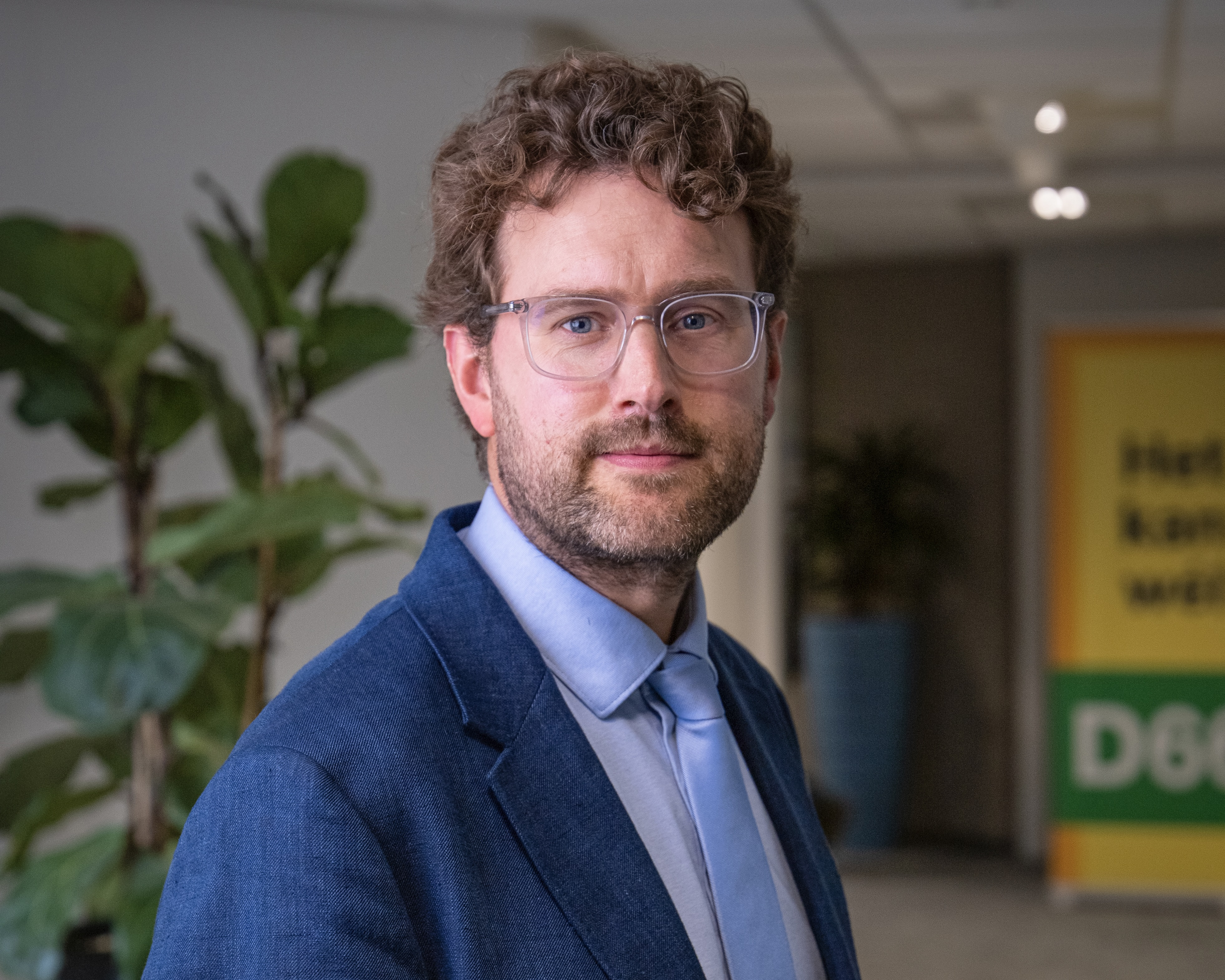
- Schoonis (2026)

Member of the House of Representatives
- Incumbent
- Assumed office 12 November 2025

Personal details
- Born: 13 March 1981 (age 45)
- Party: Democrats 66

Jan Schoonis (born 13 March 1981) is a Dutch politician who was elected to the Dutch House of Representatives in the 2025 general election. A member of the Democrats 66, Schoonis was ranked 21st on the party list for the general election and won a seat in the House of Representatives as the D66 won 26 seats.
