= Anthony Dufrane =

Belgian politician (born 1977)

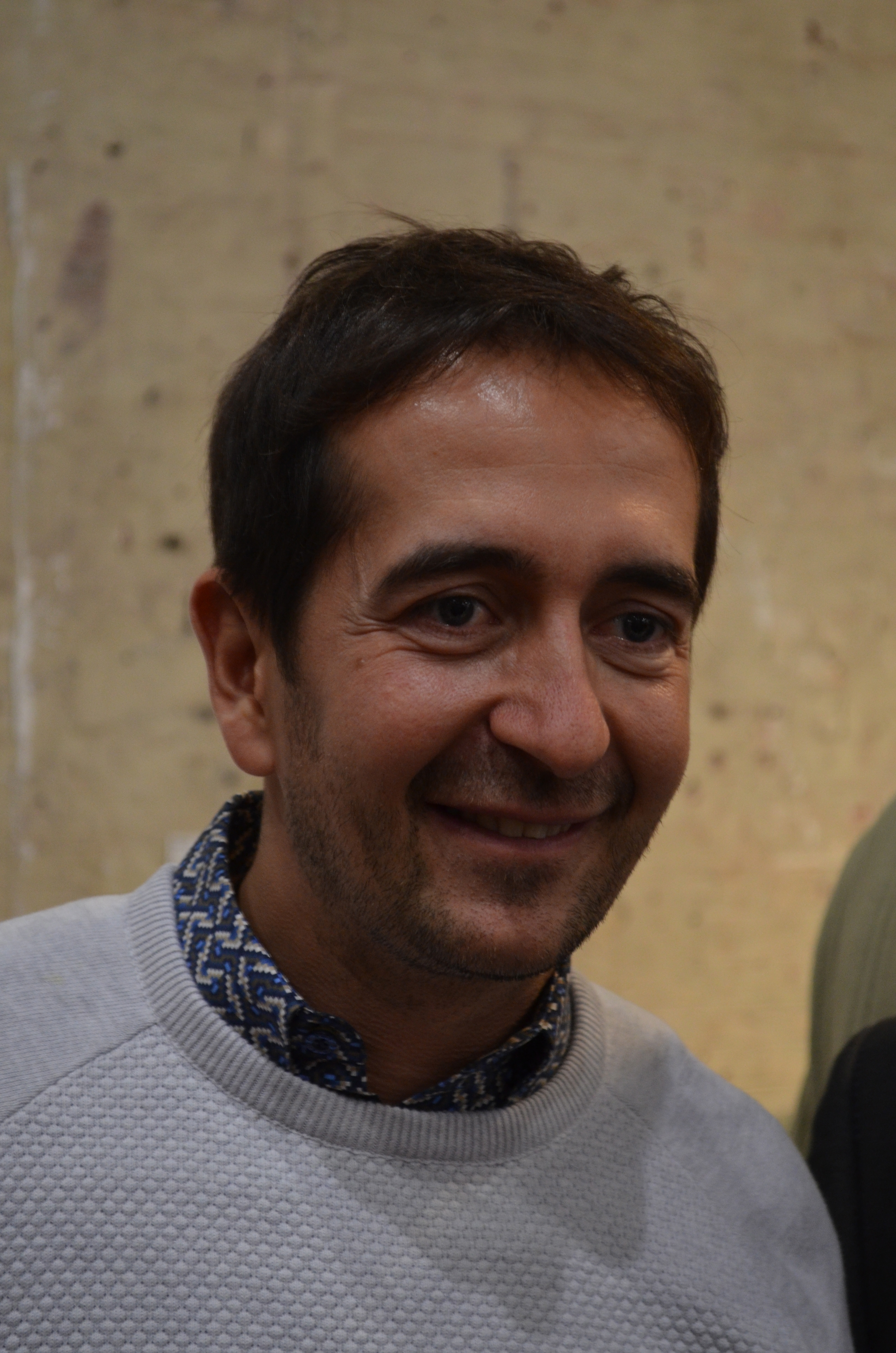
- Dufrane in 2015

Member of the Chamber of Representatives
- Incumbent
- Assumed office 10 July 2024
- Constituency: Hainaut
- In office 6 July 2010 – 14 October 2012
- Succeeded by: Bruno Van Grootenbrulle
- Constituency: Hainaut

Personal details
- Born: 10 July 1977 (age 48)
- Party: Reformist Movement (since 2024); Socialist Party (1999–2024)

Anthony Dufrane (born 10 July 1977) is a Belgian politician of the Reformist Movement. He has been a member of the Chamber of Representatives since 2024, having previously served from 2010 to 2012. From 2014 to 2019, he was a member of the Parliament of Wallonia. Until 2024, he was a member of the Socialist Party.
