= Ludivine Dedonder =

Belgian politician (born 1977)

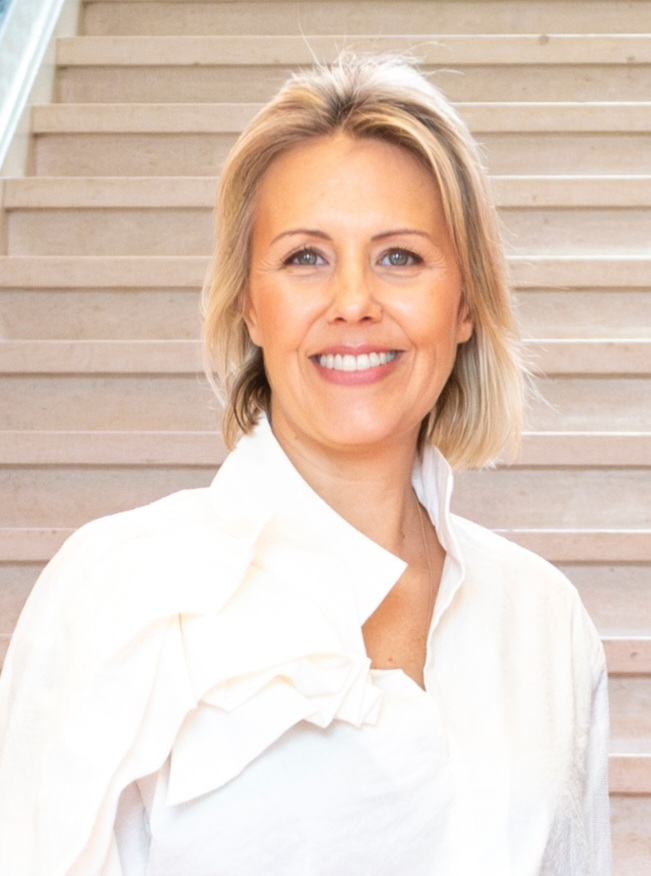
- Dedonder in 2024

Minister of Defence
- In office 1 October 2020 – 3 February 2025
- Monarch: Philippe
- Prime Minister: Alexander De Croo
- Preceded by: Philippe Goffin
- Succeeded by: Theo Francken (as Minister of Defence and Foreign Trade)

Personal details
- Born: 17 March 1977 (age 49) Tournai, Belgium
- Party: Socialist Party (francophone)
- Education: University of Liège

Ludivine Dedonder (born 17 March 1977) is a Belgian politician of the Socialist Party (PS) who served as Minister of Defence in the government of Prime Minister Alexander De Croo from 2020 to 2025.

She was elected to the Belgian Federal Parliament in the 2024 Belgian federal election.
