= Jean-Luc Crucke =

Belgian politician (born 1962)

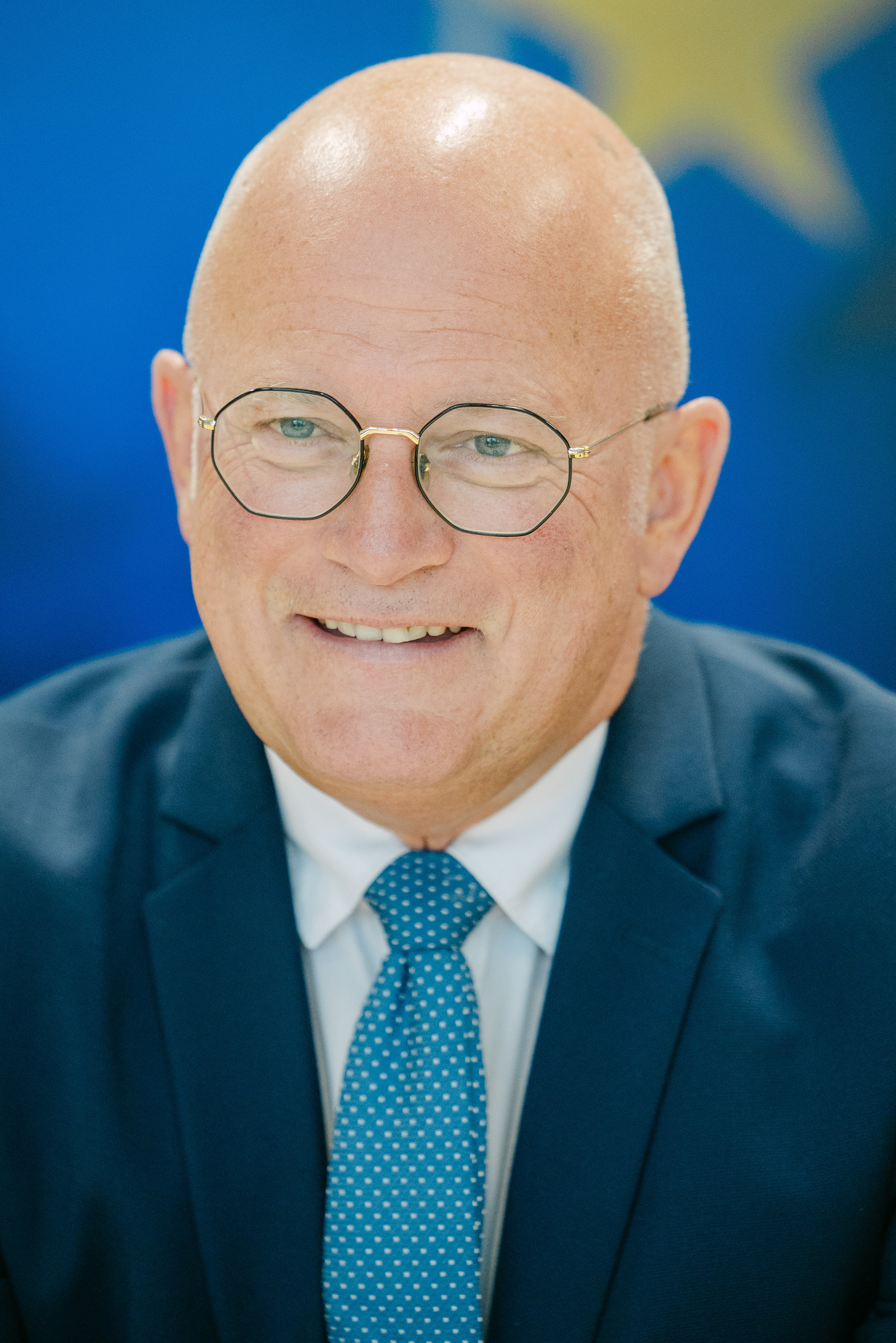
- Jean-Luc Crucke in 2025

Minister of Mobility and Climate
- Incumbent
- Assumed office 3 February 2025
- Prime Minister: Bart De Wever
- Preceded by: Georges Gilkinet (as Minister of Mobility); Zakia Khattabi (as Minister of Climate)

Member of the Chamber of Representatives
- In office 10 July 2024 – 3 February 2025
- Constituency: Hainaut
- In office 28 June 2007 – 25 June 2009
- Constituency: Hainaut

Minister of Finance, Budget and Airports of Wallonia
- In office 28 July 2017 – 13 January 2022
- Preceded by: Christophe Lacroix
- Succeeded by: Adrien Dolimont

Member of the Parliament of Wallonia
- Incumbent
- Assumed office 26 May 2019
- In office 25 June 2009 – 28 July 2017
- In office 13 June 2004 – 28 June 2007

Mayor of Frasnes-lez-Anvaing
- In office 13 June 1997 – 14 October 2018
- Preceded by: Jean-Baptiste Delhaye
- Succeeded by: Carine De Saint Martin

Personal details
- Born: 29 October 1962 (age 63) Ronse, Belgium
- Party: LE (2023–present)
- Other political affiliations: MR (1984–2023)
- Children: 2
- Education: Saint-Louis University; UCLouvain
- Occupation: Lawyer; politician

Jean-Luc Crucke (born 29 October 1962) is a Belgian politician of Les Engagés who has been serving as the Minister of Mobility and Climate in the De Wever Government since February 2025. He previously was a member of the Chamber of Representatives from 2024 until 2025, having previously served from 2007 to 2009. From 2017 to 2022, he was a minister in the government of Wallonia. Until 2023, he was a member of the Reformist Movement.
