= Marc Vervuurt =

Dutch politician (born 1993)

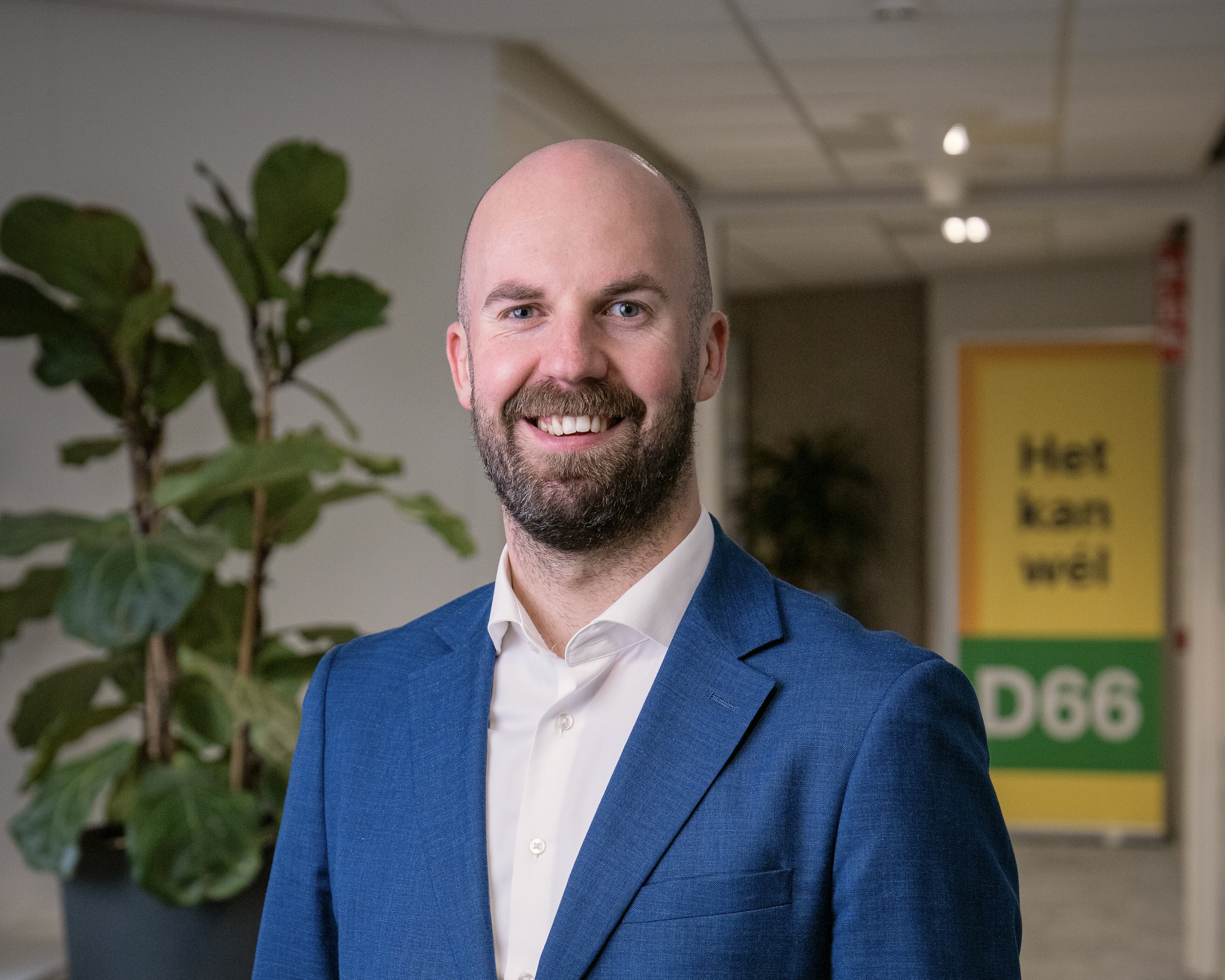
- Vervuurt in 2026

Member of the House of Representatives
- Incumbent
- Assumed office 12 November 2025

Personal details
- Born: 1993 (age 32–33)
- Party: Democrats 66 (since 2017)

Marc Vervuurt (born 1993) is a Dutch politician who was elected member of the House of Representatives in 2025. He has been a municipal councillor of Venlo since 2022.
