= Mons-Soignies (Chamber of Representatives constituency) =

Mons-Soignies was a constituency used to elect members of the Belgian Chamber of Representatives between 1995 and 2003.

== Representatives ==
Election	Representative (Party)	Representative (Party)	Representative (Party)	Representative (Party)	Representative (Party)	Representative (Party)
1995	Formed from a merger of Bergen and Soignies					
1995	Colette Burgeon (PS)	Yvon Harmegnies (PS)	Richard Biefnot (PS)	Jacques Lefevre (cdH)	Jean-Pierre Viseur (Ecolo)	Jean-Paul Moerman (PRL)
1999	Colette Burgeon (PS)	Yvon Harmegnies (PS)	Jean Depreter (PS)	Jacques Lefevre (cdH)	Gérard Gobert (Ecolo)	Robert Hondermarcq (PRL)
