= Isabelle Privé =

Belgian politician

Personal details
- Born: 8 June 1972 (age 53)
- Party: Socialist

Isabelle Privé (born 8 June 1972 in Charleroi) is a Belgian politician from the Socialist Party (PS) and former member of parliament.

== Biography ==
Privately, she became an employee at the Socialist Mutualities in Lessen.

Her first entry into politics was at the 1999 Belgian federal election. She became politically active for the PS and was elected municipal councillor of Lessen for this party in 2000. From 2001 to 2015 she was alderman there, with responsibilities including Culture and Heritage. Privé was also a provincial councillor of Hainaut Province from 2000 to 2009.

In 2009 she was briefly a member of the Chamber of Representatives, replacing Marie Arena. In May 2014 she was in eleventh (unelectable) place on the PS Chamber party list for the province of Hainaut.

She became chairwoman of the Socialist Foresighted Women's section (Rebelle) in Lessen and director of the social housing company Habitat du Pays Vert.

She is an alderman.
