= Artie Ramsodit =

Dutch politician

Member of the Senate
- Incumbent
- Assumed office 13 June 2023

Personal details
- Born: Nalinidevi Urmila Ramsodit; 19 February 1975 (age 51) Paramaribo, Suriname
- Party: PvdA (until 2026); PRO (from 2026)
- Children: 1
- Education: University of Amsterdam; University of Twente; Tilburg University

Nalinidevi Urmila "Artie" Ramsodit-de Graaf (born 19 February 1975) is a Dutch politician for Progressief Nederland (PRO) and government official. She has been a member of the Dutch Senate since 13 June 2023, having previously served as a municipal councilor in Haarlem from 2010 to 2017.

== Biography ==
Artie Ramsodit was born on 19 February 1976 in Paramaribo, and is of Indo-Surinamese descent. She came to the Netherlands with her parents at a very young age and grew up in Haarlem and the Rotterdam region. After finishing secondary school, she went on to study Public Administration at the University of Twente. A year later, she also began studying law at the University of Amsterdam. After obtaining her degree in public administration, she began working at the Dutch Ministry of Economic Affairs. During her time there, she also completed her law studies. Ramsodit later transferred to the Ministry of the Interior and Kingdom Relations. At these ministries, she held the positions of policy advisor and manager. After meeting a person there who was conducting doctoral research, Ramsodit decided to pursue a PhD focusing on policing as well. She pursued her PhD at Tilburg University from 2006 to 2014.

In 2010, Ramsodit became a member of the municipal council of Haarlem. As a municipal councilor, she held a portfolio which included housing, employment, youth, and economy. On February 16, 2017, she left the council to conduct research in Bangalore for a period.

Ramsodit is a member of the governing bodies of various organizations. She serves on the boards of several different organizations, including the University of Applied Sciences Leiden. She is also the owner of CitySolutions.nl, a start-up that is part of the Humanities Lab of the faculty of humanities at the University of Amsterdam. Since June 13, 2023, she has been a member of the Dutch Senate, where she wore a sari, a traditional Hindu garment, during her inauguration ceremony.

== Personal life ==
Ramsodit is married and has a son.
