= Patrick Prévot =

Belgian politician (born 1983)

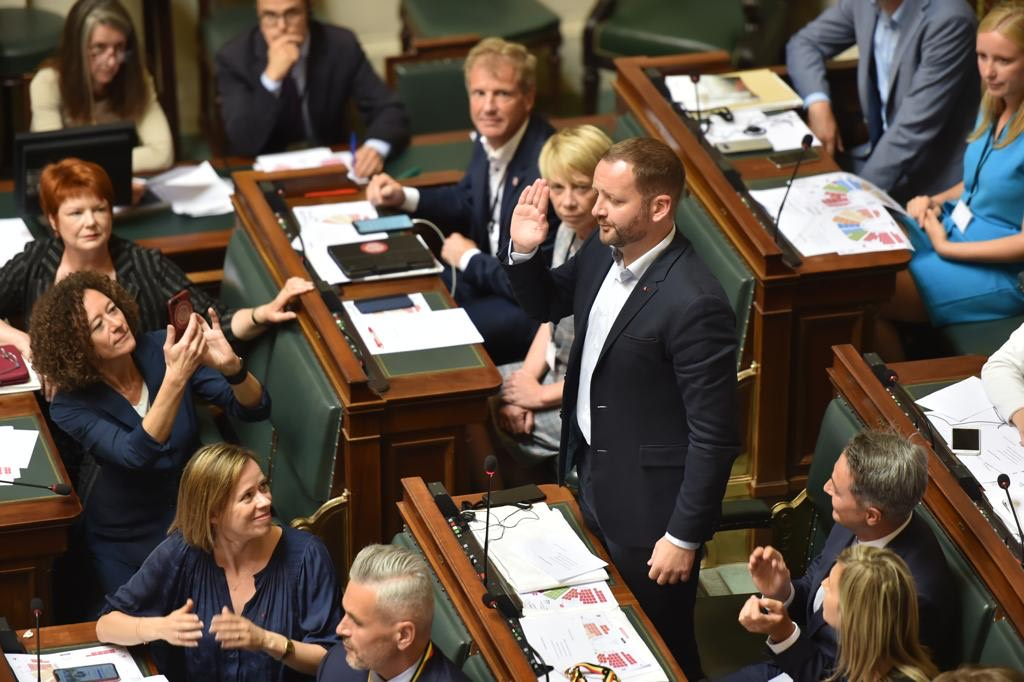
- Prévot in 2019

Member of the Chamber of Representatives
- Incumbent
- Assumed office 20 June 2019
- Constituency: Hainaut

Member of the Senate
- In office 19 June 2014 – 19 June 2019
- Nominated by: Parliament of the French Community

Personal details
- Born: 21 April 1983 (age 42)
- Party: Socialist Party

Patrick Prévot (born 21 April 1983) is a Belgian politician of the Socialist Party serving as a member of the Chamber of Representatives since 2019. From 2014 to 2019, he was a member of the Senate and the Parliament of Wallonia.
