= Revolution Movement! (Belgium) =

Belgian political group

Revolution Movement Mouvement Révolution!
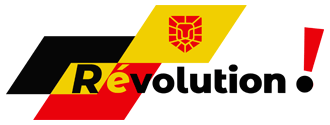
- President: Laurent Louis
- Founded: 2013 / 2025
- Dissolved: 2015
- Headquarters: La Louvière
- Ideology: Nationalism; Conservatism; E-democracy; Anti-establishment; Euroscepticism; Anti-NATO; Anti-Zionism; Antisemitism
- Political position: Far-right
- Colors: Gold

Website
- mouvement-revolution.be

Révolution!, formerly known as Debout Les Belges! (French pronunciation: [dəbu le bɛlʒ]; Belgians, Rise up!), is a French-speaking political movement in Belgium, founded and led by former Belgian MP Laurent Louis, who was previously associated with the right-wing party People's Party and then the Islamist party ISLAM.

== History ==
=== 2011-2015 ===
When he left the People's Party in 2011, Laurent Louis founded the Movement for Freedom and Democracy (Mouvement pour la liberté et la démocratie), which aimed to establish participatory democracy and put an end to political parties. In 2013, the movement was dissolved for a brief period when Laurent Louis joined the ISLAM party.

In 2014, he relaunched the MLD under the name Debout les Belges (Stand Up, Belgians). The new party adopted a socially conservative, Belgian nationalist, anti-Zionist, Eurosceptic and republican agenda.

The party was associated with French comedian Dieudonné and the quenelle gesture which he has popularized, often considered a subversive allusion to the Nazi salute. Although its leader has criticized Alain Soral, another important leader of Reconciliation Nationale. The group has been accused of antisemitism and a planned gathering of notable anti-Zionists organized by Louis was banned in 2014.

In the 2014 Belgian federal election, DLB obtained 0.86% of the votes in the Chamber of Representatives, placing the party just below the People's Party with 1.52%. For the Regional elections, the party obtained 0.81% in Wallonia. In Brussels, DLB obtained 2.3%, surpassing the People's Party (1.94%) and ISLAM (1.7%). However, the party did not win any seats anywhere.

The party was finally dissolved in 2015 following internal conflicts and legal proceedings.

=== Since 2025 ===
Between 2015 and 2025, Laurent Louis made several attempts to launch a new political party alongside his activities in cryptocurrencies for which he had been in trouble with the law but never convicted. It was finally in 2025 that he officially launched his new political movement, with Laurence Kayser following his victory in court against Opaline Meunier.

Révolution focuses on establishing e-democracy through Web3 technologies and the abolition of all political parties. At the same time, the movement promotes its anti-Zionist and Eurosceptic positions and advocates leaving NATO and the WHO.

== Election results ==
=== Chamber of Representatives ===
Election	Votes	%	Seats	+/−	Government
2014	58,043	0.86	0 / 150	New	Extra-parliamentary

=== Walloon Parliament ===
Election	Votes	%	Seats	+/−	Government
2014	16,618	0.81	0 / 75	New	Extra-parliamentary

=== Brussels Parliament ===
Election	Votes	%	Seats	+/−	Government
2014 (French language group)	9,424	2.30	0 / 72	New	Extra-parliamentary

== Website ==
- Debout Les Belges! website
- Mouvement Révolution website
