= 2014 Belgian federal election =

- 25 May 2014
- All 150 seats in the Chamber of Representatives; 76 seats needed for a majority
- Turnout: 89.37%
Party	Leader	Vote %	Seats	+/–
N-VA	Bart De Wever	20.26	33	+6
PS	Elio Di Rupo	11.67	23	−3
CD&V	Wouter Beke	11.61	18	+1
Open Vld	Gwendolyn Rutten	9.78	14	+1
MR	Charles Michel	9.64	20	+2
sp.a	Bruno Tobback	8.83	13	0
Groen	Wouter Van Besien	5.32	6	+1
cdH	Benoît Lutgen	4.98	9	0
PVDA-PTB	Peter Mertens	3.72	2	+2
Vlaams Belang	Gerolf Annemans	3.67	3	−9
Ecolo	Olivier Deleuze & Emily Hoyos	3.30	6	−2
FDF	Olivier Maingain	1.80	2	New
PP	Mischaël Modrikamen	1.50	1	0
This lists parties that won seats. See the complete results below.
Results by constituency
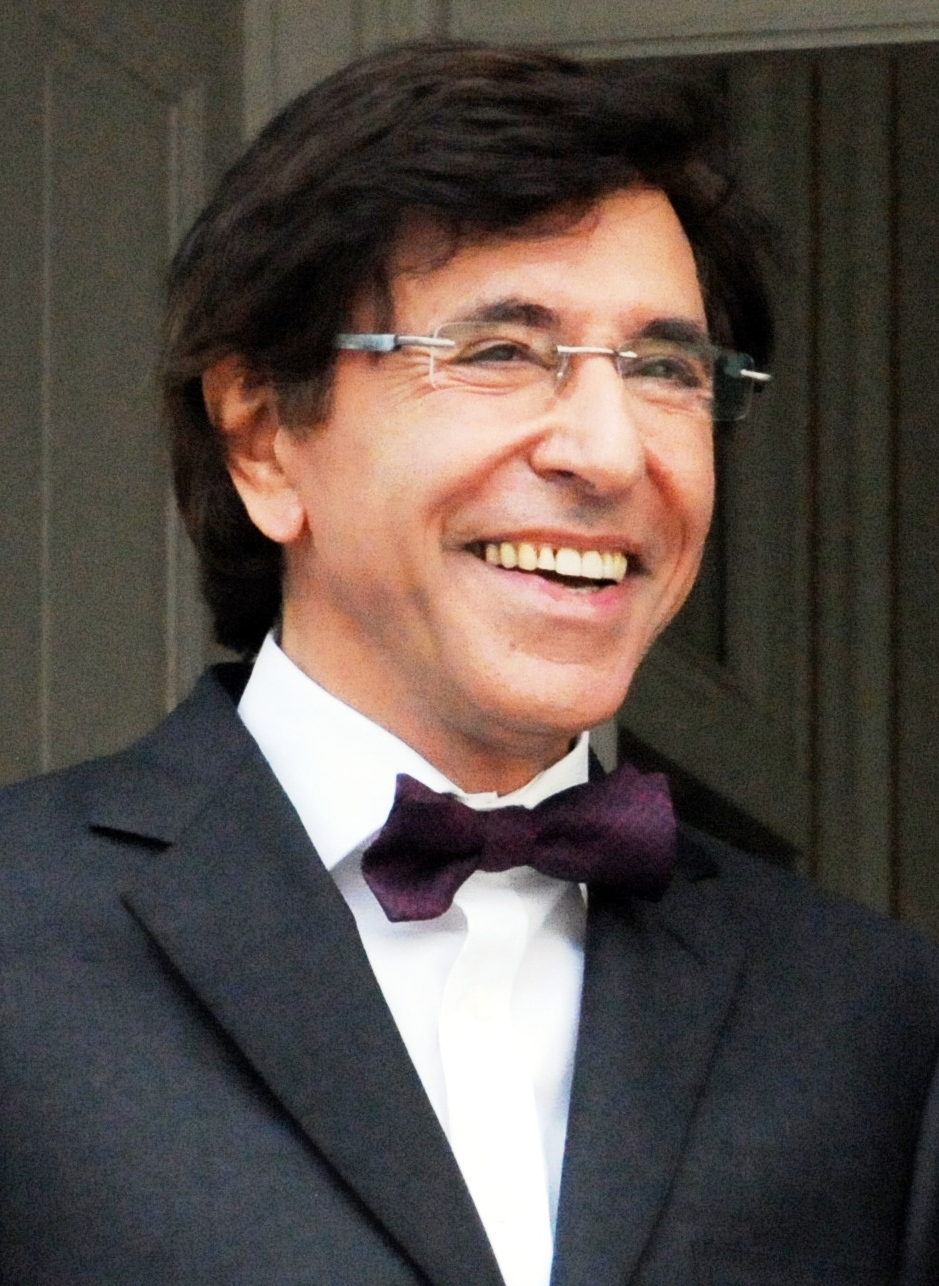

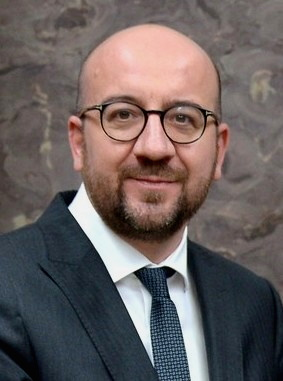
Federal Government before	Federal Government after
Di Rupo Government	Michel I Government

Federal elections were held in Belgium on 25 May 2014. All 150 members of the Chamber of Representatives were elected, whereas the Senate was no longer directly elected following the 2011–2012 state reform. These were the first elections held under King Philippe's reign.

== Date ==
As part of the state reform adopted 19 December 2013, the date of election will from now on coincide with the European elections, which the Council of the EU has scheduled for 22–25 May 2014. The regional elections in Belgium already constitutionally coincide with the European elections, consequently Belgians will vote for three elections on the same day.

On 25 April 2014, a declaration to amend the Constitution was adopted, formally dissolving parliament and triggering new elections within 40 days.

== Electoral system ==

The 150 members of the Chamber of Representatives are elected in 11 multi-member constituencies, being the ten provinces and Brussels, with between 4 and 24 seats. Seats are allocated using the d'Hondt method, with an electoral threshold of 5% per constituency. Apportionment of seats is done every ten years, last by royal order of 31 January 2013, based on the population figures of 28 May 2012.

Representatives elected from the five Flemish Region provinces, Antwerp (24), East Flanders (20), Flemish Brabant (15), Limburg (12) and West Flanders (16), automatically belong to the Dutch-speaking language group in parliament, whereas those elected from the five provinces of Wallonia, Hainaut (18), Liège (15), Luxembourg (4), Namur (6) and Walloon Brabant (5), form the French-speaking language group. The 15 members elected in Brussels may choose to join either group, though de facto only French-speaking parties reach the threshold.

The 60-member Senate is composed of 50 representatives from the regional and community parliaments, plus 10 co-opted senators proportionally divided among parties based on the result of the federal election.

=== Voters ===
All Belgian citizens aged 18 or over are obligated to participate in the election. Foreigners residing in Belgium (regardless of EU citizenship) cannot vote, whereas Belgian citizens living abroad may register to vote. Following the sixth state reform, they can no longer freely choose in which constituency their vote counts; instead the municipality is objectively defined by statutory criteria. Since the previous elections were snap elections, there was more preparation time now, allowing for significantly increased use of the option compared to 2010.

The electoral roll was fixed per 1 March 2014.

	2014	2010	Difference
Eligible Belgians residing in Belgium	7,879,874	7,725,463	+154,411 (+2.00%)
Eligible Belgians residing abroad	128,902	42,089	+86,813 (+206.26%)
voted in-person or by proxy in a municipality in Belgium	20,241	9,741	+10,500 (+107.79%)
voted in-person or by proxy in the Belgian diplomatic or consular post where they registered	19,080	13,089	+5,991 (+45.77%)
voted by mail	89,581	19,259	+70,322 (+365.14%)
Total	8,008,776	7,767,552	+241,224 (+3.11%)

151 Flemish municipalities and 2 Brussels municipalities voted electronically; the remaining 157 Flemish and 17 Brussels and all 262 Walloon municipalities voted by paper ballot.

=== Timetable ===
25 February	Start of the "waiting period" (sperperiode) running until the day of the election, during which political propaganda and expenses are strictly regulated
1 March	The electoral roll is fixed by municipal authorities
25 April	The Parliament adopts a declaration to amend the Constitution, formally dissolving parliament and triggering elections within 40 days
10 May	Final day for the official announcement of the election and the convocation letter to voters
21 May	Polling day for Belgians residing abroad in the embassies and consular posts
25 May	Polling day (from 8am until 2pm, or until 4pm where voting is done electronically)
19 June	Constitutive session of the newly elected Chamber of Representatives

== Background and reforms since last election ==
The previous 2010 election resulted in a victory for Flemish nationalist N-VA. The coalition formation stalemate went on for a record-breaking 541 days. Eventually, the negotiating parties agreed upon a sixth Belgian state reform and the Di Rupo Government was finally formed on 6 December 2011 and comprised PS, MR, CD&V, Open VLD, sp.a and cdH.

The state reform has the following consequences for the election in 2014:

- The controversial electoral constituency of Brussels-Halle-Vilvoorde no longer exists; rather, each province plus the federal capital now has its own constituency, and voter discrimination has been abolished.
- The Senate will no longer be directly elected.
- The term length will be increased from 4 years to 5 years, and the election will always coincide with the European Parliament election.

== Election campaign ==
The campaign topics largely focused on socio-economic reforms: job creation and unemployment, tax reform, pensions, ... This campaign also featured an unprecedented level of quantified programmes by political parties. For example, the N-VA released its "V plan" and CD&V its "3D plan".

One week before the election day, former CD&V Prime Minister Jean-Luc Dehaene suddenly died while in France. Several debates were cancelled, and CD&V as well as all other Flemish parties suspended their campaign for a few days.

=== Jewish Museum shooting ===
On 24 May, the day before the elections, a shooting occurred at the Belgian Jewish Museum in Brussels, with three people reported dead. Self-described anti-Zionist MP Laurent Louis suggested that the attack could be a false flag operation seeking to discredit him and his political party (Debout les Belges, or "Stand Up, Belgians") on the eve of the elections.

== Political parties ==
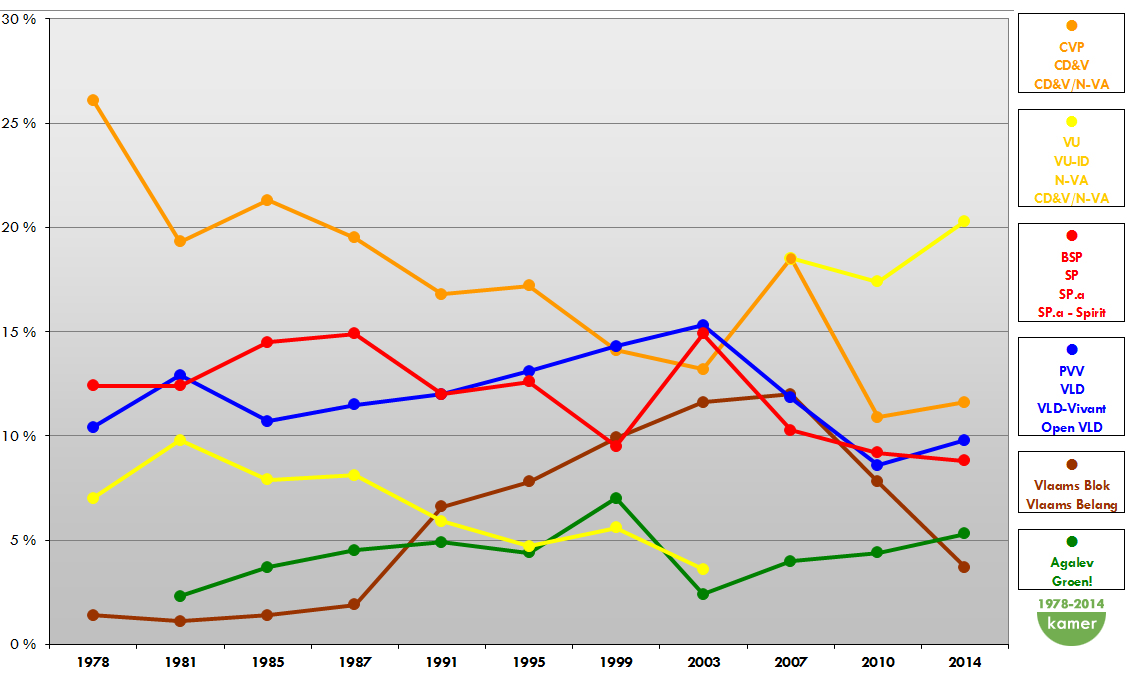
The primary six Flemish political parties and their results for the House of Representatives (Kamer). From 1978 to 2014, in percentages for the complete 'Kingdom'.

=== Current situation ===
In 2010, ten parties won seats in the Belgian Senate: Christen-Democratisch en Vlaams (CD&V), Centre Démocrate Humaniste (cdH), Socialistische Partij Anders (sp.a), Parti Socialiste (PS), Open Vld, Mouvement Réformateur (MR), Groen, Ecolo, New Flemish Alliance (N-VA) and Vlaams Belang. In the Chamber of Representatives, the People's Party (PP) and Libertarian, Direct, Democratic (LDD) each also won one seat.

During the legislation, the Francophone Democratic Federalists (FDF) separated from the MR party and are now represented in the Chamber with 3 representatives, but have no Senators. The PP Member of Parliament left the party and became an independent. One Vlaams Belang member of the Chamber and one Vlaams Belang member of the Senate left their party and decided to become independents.

Thus, currently the ten major parties are represented in both the Chamber and the Senate; in addition, LDD and FDF are represented in the Chamber of Representatives.

However, most of the major parties only operate in the Dutch-speaking or in the French-speaking constituencies. Voters who live in the provinces of Antwerp, East Flanders, Flemish Brabant, Limburg or West Flanders can only vote for CD&V, Groen, N-VA, Open VLD, sp.a and Vlaams Belang, apart from the minor parties – except when a French-speaking party would present a list in one of these provinces, which has not happened except for a FDF and a PP list in Flemish Brabant. In the provinces of Hainaut, Liège, Luxembourg, Namur and Walloon Brabant, voters can only vote for cdH, Ecolo, MR and PS, apart from the minor parties – except when a Dutch-speaking party would present a list in one of these provinces, which has not happened in this elections.

In the constituency of Liège, the German-speaking parties CSP, Ecolo, PFF and SP all form one list with their French-speaking counterparts; the name of these lists only mention the French-speaking party. Therefore, the CSP politicians are on the cdH list, the Ecolo ones on the Ecolo list, PFF on the MR list and SP on the PS list. The other German-speaking parties (ProDG and Vivant) do not present a list due to their marginal chance of getting a seat in Parliament.

In the constituency of Brussels-Capital, Ecolo and Groen formed one list under the name Ecolo. CD&V, N-VA, Open Vld, sp.a and Vlaams Belang will each present a single list.

LDD only presented a list in West Flanders. FDF presented a list in all Walloon constituencies, in Brussels-Capital and in Flemish Brabant. PVDA-PTB presented a list in all eleven constituencies of Belgium, making it one of the few parties which are represented in the whole of Belgium.

=== Main candidates ===
The following candidates are the first on the respective party list (lijsttrekker / tête de liste) per constituency.

==== Dutch-speaking constituencies ====
Party	Antwerp	East Flanders	Flemish Brabant	Limburg	West Flanders	Brussels
Major parties
CD&V	Servais Verherstraeten	Pieter De Crem	Koen Geens	Wouter Beke	Hendrik Bogaert	Benjamin Dalle
Groen	Meyrem Almaci	Stefaan Van Hecke	Anne Dedry	Katrijn Conjaerts	Wouter De Vriendt	Annalisa Gadaleta (3rd on ECOLO list)
N-VA	Bart De Wever	Siegfried Bracke	Theo Francken	Steven Vandeput	Brecht Vermeulen	Luc Demullier
Open Vld	Annemie Turtelboom	Alexander De Croo	Maggie De Block	Patrick Dewael	Vincent Van Quickenborne	Thomas Ryckalts
sp.a	Monica De Coninck	Karin Temmerman	Hans Bonte	Peter Van Velthoven	Johan Vande Lanotte	Maité Morren
Vlaams Belang	Filip Dewinter	Barbara Pas	Philip Claeys	Bert Schoofs	Peter Logghe	Hilde Roossens
Minor parties
LDD	—N/a	—N/a	—N/a	—N/a	Jean-Marie Dedecker	—N/a
PVDA+	Peter Mertens	Tom De Meester	Sander Vandecapelle	Kim De Witte	Filip Desmet	Benjamin Pestieau
BUB	Vincent Massaut	Bic Verbiest	Marie-Luce Lovinfosse	Tonnie Brichard	Mileen Verpoorten	Hans Van de Cauter
Pirate Party	Christophe Cop	Jonas De Koning	—N/a	Jo Vols	—N/a	—N/a

==== French-speaking constituencies ====
Party	Hainaut	Liège	Luxembourg	Namur	Walloon Brabant	Brussels
Major parties
cdH	Catherine Fonck	Melchior Wathelet	Benoît Lutgen	Benoît Dispa	Cédric du Monceau	Francis Delpérée
Ecolo	Jean-Marc Nollet	Muriel Gerkens	Cécile Thibaut	Georges Gilkinet	Marcel Cheron	Zakia Khattabi
FDF	Christophe Verbist	Hugues Lannoy	Serge Saintes	Monique Felix	Amaury Alexandre	Olivier Maingain
MR	Olivier Chastel	Daniel Bacquelaine	Dominique Tilmans	Sabine Laruelle	Charles Michel	Didier Reynders
PS	Elio Di Rupo	Willy Demeyer	Philippe Courard	Jean-Marc Delizée	André Flahaut	Laurette Onkelinx
Minor parties
PTB	Marco Van Hees	Raoul Hedebouw	Jonathan Taffarel	Thierry Warmoes	Liza Lebrun	Benjamin Pestieau
PP	Mischaël Modrikamen	Aldo Carcaci	Michel Renquin	Nathalie Strubbe	Michaël Debast	Tatiana Hachimi
BUB	Romuald Joly	Nicolas Jacquemin	Jo Conter	Adrien Mertens	Dimitri Parée	Hans van de Cauter
Pirate Party	Paul Bossu	Paul Thunissen	—N/a	—N/a	—N/a	—N/a

== Opinion polling ==
The results of the opinion polls are usually split into separate numbers for the three Belgian regions. Below, they are transposed to national figures.

Date(s) conducted	Newspaper	N-VA	PS	CD&V	MR	sp.a	Open Vld	VB	CDH	Ecolo	Groen	Others	Lead
15 April 2014	La Libre Belgique	20.6%	10.2%	10.7%	8.4%	8.5%	8.7%	6.4%	3.7%	3.9%	4.9%	14.0%	9.9% over CD&V
11 October 2013	De Standaard	17.6%	–	12.0%	–	8.4%	8.7%	6.7%	–	–	6.3%	40.4%	5.6% over CD&V
6 September 2013	La Libre Belgique	22.3%	10.8%	10.9%	8.8%	7.6%	7.5%	7.2%	4.7%	4.7%	4.4%	11.2%	11.4% over CD&V
1 September 2013	Le Soir	19.3%	11.3%	10.8%	8.7%	8.0%	8.9%	7.5%	4.5%	4.3%	4.0%	12.5%	8.0% over PS
16 June 2013	Le Soir	22.0%	10.5%	9.9%	8.3%	8.7%	8.3%	5.9%	4.6%	4.7%	4.8%	12.1%	11.5% over PS
25 May 2013	La Libre Belgique	20.6%	10.2%	10.0%	8.9%	8.9%	8.1%	8.1%	4.7%	5.4%	4.1%	11.0%	10.4% over PS
25 May 2013	De Standaard	20.2%	–	10.9%	–	9.3%	6.4%	6.7%	–	–	6.0%	40.5%	9.3% over CD&V
24 March 2013	Le Soir	21.2%	11.8%	10.5%	8.6%	8.6%	7.8%	6.6%	5.0%	4.4%	4.9%	10.7%	9.4% over PS
16 March 2013	Het Laatste Nieuws	21.0%	–	9.4%	–	8.5%	7.5%	7.0%	–	–	5.2%	41.4%	11.6% over CD&V
22 February 2013	La Libre Belgique	24.3%	10.8%	8.8%	9.0%	9.3%	6.2%	4.2%	4.6%	4.7%	5.4%	12.7%	13.5% over PS
14 October 2012	Provincial election 2012	18.0%	11.7%	13.5%	10.2%	8.6%	9.2%	5.6%	6.2%	4.8%	5.3%	6.7%	4.5% over CD&V
14 September 2012	De Standaard	22.6%	–	11.5%	–	9.0%	6.7%	5.9%	–	–	4.9%	39.4%	11.1% over CD&V
10 June 2010	Federal election 2010	17.4%	13.7%	10.8%	9.3%	9.2%	8.6%	7.8%	5.5%	4.8%	4.4%	8.4%	3.7% over PS

== Results ==
At the Flemish side, Vlaams Belang and LDD suffered major losses; their votes went to N-VA, which increased its position as largest party. CD&V, Open Vld and Groen gained slightly as well, while sp.a lost slightly.

At the French-speaking side, PS, cdH and Ecolo suffer losses while MR gained as well as newcomers PTB-GO! and FDF.

Party	Votes	%	+/–	Seats	+/–
New Flemish Alliance	1,366,397	20.26	+2.86	33	+6
Parti Socialiste	787,058	11.67	–2.03	23	–3
Christen-Democratisch en Vlaams	783,040	11.61	+0.76	18	+1
Open Vlaamse Liberalen en Democraten	659,571	9.78	+1.14	14	+1
Mouvement Réformateur	650,260	9.64	+0.36	20	+2
Socialistische Partij Anders	595,466	8.83	–0.41	13	0
Groen	358,947	5.32	+0.94	6	+1
Centre démocrate humaniste	336,184	4.98	–0.54	9	0
Vlaams Belang	247,738	3.67	–4.09	3	–9
Ecolo	222,524	3.30	–1.50	6	–2
Parti du Travail de Belgique-GO !	132,943	1.97	New	2	New
Francophone Democratic Federalists	121,384	1.80	New	2	New
Partij van de Arbeid+	118,333	1.75	+0.94	0	0
People's Party	102,581	1.52	+0.23	1	0
Debout Les Belges!	58,043	0.86	New	0	New
Libertair, Direct, Democratisch	28,414	0.42	–1.89	0	–1
La Droite	26,035	0.39	New	0	New
Pirate Party	23,169	0.34	New	0	New
Faire place Nette	15,467	0.23	New	0	New
ISLAM	13,719	0.20	New	0	New
Belgian Union	12,103	0.18	–0.14	0	0
ROSSEM	11,680	0.17	New	0	New
Wallonie d'Abord	11,221	0.17	–0.39	0	0
Nation	10,216	0.15	New	0	New
Pirate	9,845	0.15	New	0	New
Rassemblement Wallonie France	7,394	0.11	–0.44	0	0
Mouvement de Gauche	4,529	0.07	New	0	New
Lutte Ouvrière	3,539	0.05	New	0	New
PP Partipensionnes	3,178	0.05	–0.06	0	0
Front Wallon	3,080	0.05	New	0	New
New Alternative Wallonia	2,785	0.04	New	0	New
Sociaal Democraten & Progressieven	2,298	0.03	New	0	New
PP	2,281	0.03	New	0	New
P+	2,254	0.03	New	0	New
Valeurs Libérales Citoyennes	2,028	0.03	New	0	New
Walloon Rally	1,598	0.02	New	0	New
Gauches Communes	1,445	0.02	New	0	New
Vox Populi Belgica	1,280	0.02	New	0	New
Égalitaires !	953	0.01	New	0	New
Partij Voor Gehandicapten en Welzijn	932	0.01	New	0	New
Parti Libertarien	750	0.01	New	0	New
MGJOD	460	0.01	New	0	New
CIM	430	0.01	New	0	New
MOVE	400	0.01	New	0	New
Agora Erasmus	382	0.01	New	0	New
LaLutte-DeStrijd	213	0.00	New	0	New
Total	6,744,547	100.00	–	150	0
Valid votes	6,744,547	94.23			
Invalid/blank votes	412,951	5.77			
Total votes	7,157,498	100.00			
Registered voters/turnout	8,008,776	89.37			
Source: IBZ

=== In detail ===
Dutch-speaking constituencies																Bilingual constituency		
Party	Antwerp			East Flanders			Flemish Brabant			Limburg			West Flanders			Brussels		
Party	Votes	Perc.	Seats	Votes	Perc.	Seats	Votes	Perc.	Seats	Votes	Perc.	Seats	Votes	Perc.	Seats	Votes	Perc.	Seats
N-VA	449,531	39.38	11	306,309	31.03	6	192,698	28.37	5	174,030	31.39	5	230,265	28.50	6	13,240	2.65	0
CD&V	183,636	16.09	4	177,178	17.95	4	112,251	16.53	3	125,962	22.72	3	175,669	21.74	4	8,193	1.64	0
OPEN VLD	116,892	10.24	2	178,911	18.12	4	170,128	25.05	4	68,713	12.39	2	111,388	13.79	2	13,294	2.66	0
SP.A	132,096	11.57	3	131,607	13.33	3	81,254	11.96	2	98,194	17.71	2	142,406	17.63	3	9,633	1.93	0
GROEN	112,477	9.85	2	90,144	9.13	2	59,096	8.70	1	33,244	6.00	0	63,657	7.88	1	ECOLO		
VL. BELANG	79,852	7.00	2	61,523	6.23	1	28,857	4.25	0	34,020	6.14	0	38,232	4.73	0	5,165	1.03	0
PTB/PVDA+	51,638	4.52	0	26,294	2.66	0	12,664	1.86	0	14,253	2.57	0	13,397	1.66	0	PTB/PVDA–GO!		
Total	1,141,541	100.00	24	987,205	100.00	20	679,125	100.00	15	554,454	100.00	12	807,929	100.00	16			
French-speaking constituencies																Bilingual constituency		
Party	Hainaut			Liège			Luxembourg			Namur			Walloon Brabant			Brussels		
Party	Votes	Perc.	Seats	Votes	Perc.	Seats	Votes	Perc.	Seats	Votes	Perc.	Seats	Votes	Perc.	Seats	Votes	Perc.	Seats
PS	303,085	41.04	9	187,934	30.00	5	37,373	22.02	1	83,361	27.83	2	51,359	21.41	1	124,053	24.86	5
MR	153,304	20.76	5	158,062	25.23	5	41,346	24.36	1	84,788	28.31	2	97,741	40.75	3	115,049	23.05	4
CDH	76,812	10.40	2	81,789	13.05	2	56,702	33.41	2	48,135	16.07	1	26,335	10.98	0	46,508	9.32	2
ECOLO	43,489	5.89	1	56,902	9.08	1	13,471	7.94	0	29,186	9.74	1	27,356	11.40	1	52,147	10.45	2
PTB/PVDA–GO!	38,194	5.17	1	50,609	8.08	1	4,003	2.36	0	14,559	4.86	0	6,449	2.69	0	19,142	3.84	0
FDF	14,382	1.95	0	13,917	2.22	0	2,811	1.66	0	8,367	2.79	0	11,198	4.67	0	55,323	11.08	2
PP	32,158	4.35	0	32,237	5.15	1	6,980	4.11	0	13,029	4.35	0	9,544	3.98	0	8,651	1.73	0
Total	738,496	100.00	18	601,826	100.00	15	169,719	100.00	4	299,512	100.00	6	239,869	100.00	5	499,082	100.00	15

=== Senate ===
2014 marked the first year when the Senate was no longer directly elected, since the sixth state reform of 2011. Now, the regional parliaments elect 50 senators based on the results of the concurrent regional elections (the Flemish Parliament elects 29, the Parliament of the French Community elects ten, the Walloon Parliament elects eight, the Parliament of the Brussels-Capital Region elects two Francophone senators and the Parliament of the German-speaking Community elects one). The elected senators in turn co-opt 10 senators (six Dutch-speaking and four Francophone), making a total of 60 senators.

The distribution of seats among parties resulted as following:

Party	Seats			
Party	Elected	Co-opted	Total	+/–
New Flemish Alliance	10	2	12	+3
Socialist Party	8	1	9	+2
Christian Democratic and Flemish	7	1	8	+4
Reformist Movement	7	1	8	+4
Open Flemish Liberals and Democrats	4	1	5	+1
Socialist Party Differently	4	1	5	–1
Humanist Democratic Centre	3	1	4	+2
Ecolo	2	1	3	–1
Groen	2	1	3	+2
Vlaams Belang	2	0	2	–1
Party for Freedom and Progress	1	0	1	+1
Total	50	10	60	–11

== Government formation ==
On 27 May, King Philippe nominated Bart De Wever (N-VA) as informateur, meaning he is tasked with finding enough points of agreement for a possible coalition.

After five months of discussions, a centre-right coalition of four parties (CD&V, Open Vld, MR and N-VA) came to agreement on 7 October with Walloon Charles Michel as prime minister. Yet it is a Flanders-focused coalition that excludes Socialists from the government for the first time in 26 years. Michel would be Belgium's youngest prime minister after the 28 hours of discussions over achieving a balanced budget by 2018. The announcement was made by party colleague and Budget Minister Olivier Chastel on Twitter: "Charles Michel becomes prime minister."
