= Suzanne André =

Belgian cartoonist and painter

- Born: December 28, 1909; Saint-Gilles
- Died: March 12, 1997 (aged 87); Forest
- Occupation: Painter, illustrator, cartoonist, comics artist, comics writer
- Employer: Line; Ons Volkske; Tintin
- Style: Bande dessinée
- Spouse(s): Francis André

Suzanne André (December 28, 1909 – March 12, 1997) was a Belgian cartoonist and painter.

André was born Suzanne Caroline Isabelle Catteau on December 28, 1909, in Saint-Gilles, Belgium. In 1934, she married artist and writer Francis André.

After World War II, André began drawing comics and became one of Belgium's few female comics artists at the time. She contributed to the girls' magazine Annette from 1945 to 1948, drawing the stories Le Chevalier sans Visage (1946) and Le Dernier Voyage du San Diego (1947). She worked on the socialist newspaper Le Peuple, illustrating their children's page Les Jeunes. There, she drew the educational series Histoire Illustrée des Travailleurs from 1947 to 1948, each week telling a story from working class history. She became one of the few women to publish in the magazine Tintin, contributing single page historical biographies to both Tintin and Line in the late 1940s and 1950s.

Suzanne André died on March 12, 1997, in Forest, Belgium.
