= Laurent Louis =

Belgian politician (born 1980)

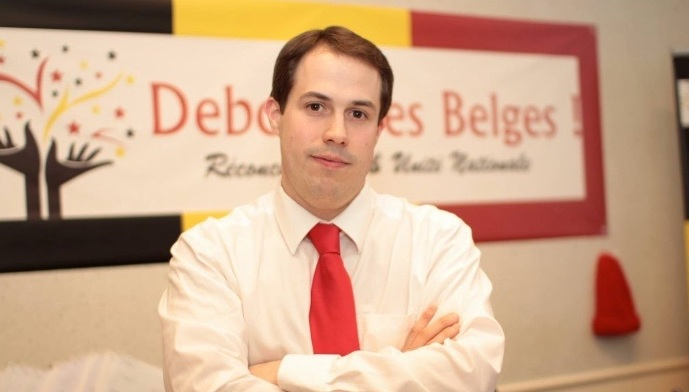
- Photo of Laurent Louis in the Belgian Parliament

Member of the Belgian Chamber of Representatives for Walloon Brabant
- In office 13 June 2010 – 25 May 2014
- Monarchs: Albert II; Philippe

Personal details
- Born: 29 February 1980 (age 46) Nivelles, Belgium
- Party: Révolution! (since 2025)
- Other political affiliations: Reformist Movement (2007-2010); People's Party (2010-2011); ISLAM (2013); Debout Les Belges! (2013-2015)

Laurent Louis (born 29 February 1980) is a French-speaking Belgian politician, former member of the Belgian Chamber of Representatives, and a Holocaust denier. He is known for antisemitic speeches and actions, Holocaust denial, and for spreading rumors about other public figures.

On 17 June 2014, Louis received a suspended sentence of 8 months in prison for slander relating to accusations of pedophilia he had made against public figures. In 2015, he was convicted of breaking the 1995 Belgian law against Holocaust denial.

== Career ==
Louis began his parliamentary career as a member of the conservative People's Party, led by Belgian Jewish politician Mischaël Modrikamen, from which he was expelled after a few months in office. In 2011 he created a new political party, the Movement for Liberty and Democracy (Mouvement pour la liberté et la démocratie), which he dissolved in January 2013 and began advocating the dissolution of all political parties.

He then joined the Islamist Belgian party ISLAM. He soon had a falling out with them although he continued to claim to be the party's president, with a spokesman for the party noting, "We had been warned that he was not a stable person, but had decided to give him a chance."

In late 2013, Louis founded a movement called Belgians, Rise Up! (Debout Les Belges!). As of April 2014, it was said to be riven by internal conflict, and after the May 2014 Belgian federal elections, Louis announced that he was dissolving his party, which had received less than 1% of votes and would thus not receive any seat either at the federal or regional levels.

In 2025, he founded a new Belgian political movement called 'Revolution!'. The movement aims to introduce direct democracy via Web3 technology and abolish political parties. Apart from that, members are free to vote as they wish.

== Accusations against public figures ==
After accusing several prominent figures of pedophilia, a 2012 editorial in Le Vif accused Louis in turn of using anti-pedophile activism in order to promote himself. On 27 March 2014, during a parliamentary debate on the costs of the visit of the US President, Louis ended a speech by accusing the Prime Minister, Elio Di Rupo, of being a pedophile: "Thank you, Mister Pedophile… er, Prime Minister, sorry!" This led to the suspension of the session and the temporary withdrawal of Louis's right to speak before the chamber. Louis repeated this allegation in April 2014, during judicial proceedings against him for slander; he was convicted of some, but not all, of these allegations and received a suspended sentence of 8 months in prison on 17 June 2014.

== Anti-Zionism and antisemitism ==
In 2013, Laurent Louis declared himself to be an anti-Zionist and espoused a theory alleging that the Holocaust was funded by Zionists to advance Zionism. He wrote on his Facebook profile:

Look at how Zionists financed Hitler and created the Second World War in order to further their project, the foundation of the State of Israel ... There it is, that's how Zionists have become the masters of the world.

At a support rally for Hezbollah and Syrian President Bashar al-Assad held in front of the Israeli embassy in Brussels in 2013, he stepped on the Flag of Israel and was also seen holding a Hezbollah flag and a portrait of Assad. He was quoted as saying to Syrian national TV, "Europe is being used in the conflict as a tool in the hands of Israel, the rogue state." The incident led to calls for his impeachment.

Louis has met several times with the French comedian Dieudonné, referring to himself as Dieudonné's "ambassador" to Belgium and performing the quenelle gesture popularized by Dieudonné (reminiscent of the Nazi salute).

In January 2014, during discussion of current affairs in the Chamber of Representatives, he made the quenelle gesture and spoke of, "this Holocaust produced and financed, let us remember, by the founders of Zionism." The president of the chamber condemned these remarks and the "hateful" and "uncalled-for" gesture, while the Belgian League Against Antisemitism brought suit against Laurent Louis for "antisemitism and Holocaust denial."

In Spring 2014, Laurent Louis announced that a "European Congress of Dissidence" would be held on 4 May in the Brussels-Capital region, including Dieudonné and other French figures such as Alain Soral, Kémi Seba, and the antisemitic essayist Hervé Ryssen. The demonstration – described in the press as an "antisemitic meeting" – was prohibited by Belgian authorities. The location of the meeting, kept secret until the last minute, was finally announced as Anderlecht, but the approximately 500 people who attended were dispersed by law enforcement.

=== Jewish Museum of Belgium shooting ===
Following the 24 May 2014 fatal shooting at the Jewish Museum of Belgium, Joel Rubinfeld of the Belgian League Against Antisemitism described the act as "the inevitable result of a climate that distills hatred... it will be necessary to use all legal means to silence the preachers of this hate who are responsible for spreading this virus of anti-Jewish hatred", specifically mentioning Laurent Louis and Dieudonné.

Louis Laurent vehemently denounced Rubinfeld's accusations on his Facebook page and denying that his views were antisemitic. He suggested that the attack could be a false flag operation seeking to discredit him and his political party on the eve of the 2014 Belgian federal elections:

This villainous act is clearly being used to tarnish my image and that of Debout les Belges on the eve of the elections. ... Should we see in this a false flag aiming to reduce the success of Debout les Belges in tomorrow's elections?

Louis later posted that he had received death threats and that police claimed his life was in danger.

=== Conviction for Holocaust denial ===
In June 2015, Louis gained a suspended 6-month sentence for breaking the 1995 Belgian law against Holocaust denial and lost his right to run for office in the next six years. The charges related to comments in blog posts he wrote in June 2014 in support of Jean-Marie Le Pen, saying "Le Pen has said that the gas chambers were just a detail in World War II history and that can be shocking, but if we think about it for a moment, is that so wrong?”. He filed an appeal, which was unsuccessful and in 2017 was ordered by the Belgian Court of Appeal, in lieu of a sentence and fine, to visit one Nazi concentration camp a year for the next five years.

== Support for Hezbollah ==
On 2 November 2015, Al-Manar TV reported that a delegation from Europe, which included Louis, had recently met with Hezbollah Deputy Secretary-General Naim Qassem as part of a "show of solidarity with the resistance in its fight against terrorism." During the broadcast, Louis stated that Hezbollah's "fight against terrorism constitutes a comprehensive defense of humanity, and of interfaith coexistence," while adding that "The Western leaders' collaboration with terrorism has been exposed, despite their false claims that they are protecting democracy and human rights."

== See also ==
- List of Belgian representatives
