= Belgian Chamber Committee on the Interior =

The Committee on the Interior, General Affairs and the Civil Service (Dutch: Commissie voor de Binnenlandse Zaken, de Algemene Zaken en het Openbaar Ambt, French: Commission de l'Intérieur, des Affaires générales et de la Fonction publique), more commonly referred to as the Committee on the Interior, is a standing committee of the Belgian Chamber of Representatives. It is responsible for all matters related to the internal affairs of Belgium. The committee consists of 17 members and is currently chaired by Brecht Vermeulen (N-VA).
