= Liberal Democrats (Belgium) =

Liberal Democrats Libéraux Démocrates
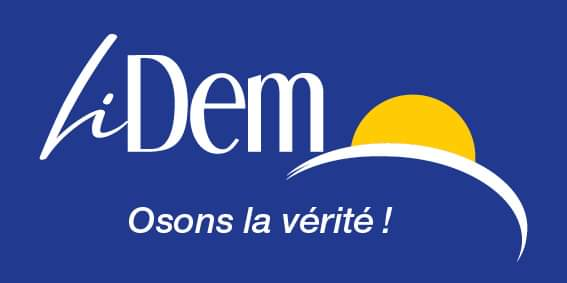
- Leader: Vacant
- General Secretary: Nadine Carepel
- Founded: 2019
- Split from: Mouvement Réformateur
- Headquarters: Brussels
- Ideology: Conservative liberalism Belgian nationalism Euroscepticism
- Political position: Right-wing
- Chamber of Representatives: 0 / 150
- Senate: 0 / 60
- Flemish Parliament: 0 / 124
- Brussels Parliament: 0 / 89
- European Parliament: 0 / 21

Website
- liberauxdemocrates.be

Liberal Democrats (French: Libéraux Démocrates, pronounced [libeʁo demɔkʁat]) is a minor French-speaking political party in Belgium.

== History and ideology ==
The party was founded as the Listes Destexhe by former Senator, author and Mouvement Réformateur (MR) politician Alain Destexhe in February 2019. Destexhe had left the MR feeling the party had moved too far to the left and because he opposed the UN Global Compact on Migration (being the only MR senator to vote against it). He and sought to create his own party list to compete in the 2019 Belgian regional elections in the Walloon and Brussels capital regions. Detesxhe stated his new party would be based on the French Les Républicains party and later defined the party as the Francophone equivalent to the Dutch-speaking New Flemish Alliance party in policy areas, albeit supporting the current model of Belgian federalism as opposed to confederalism. The party also held discussions on whether to form an alliance with Mischaël Modrikamen's People's Party due to the similarities in ideology or even merge the two parties together.

In part due to the short time before the regional elections, Destexhe list did not secure any seats and announced in May it would re-establish itself with a new name. In June Liberal Democrats was subsequently chosen. The party defines itself as a "liberal democratic right-wing party" and has a 10 point policy plan, which includes curbing immigration levels, stronger integration policies and opposition to multiculturalism, improving public management, reviewing the benefits system, stricter prison sentences for violent criminals, improving schools and reducing traffic and pollution levels. The party also contained notable members including counter-terrorism expert Claude Moniquet and secretary general of the Belgian Confederation of Automobile Trade and Repair union André-Pierre Puget.

In 2019, Destxhe announced he was standing down as party leader and was replaced by Moniquet. However, Moniquet also stood down in 2020. The party's leadership is currently vacant. Some former members of the Liberal Democrats later joined the new right-wing Chez Nous party.
