= The Movement (right-wing populist group) =

Brussels-based organization

- Formation: 2017 (registration), 2019 (relaunch)
- Founder: Steve Bannon
- Type: Nonprofit organization
- Location(s): Brussels (designated headquarters)
- Region served: Europe
- Leader: Steve Bannon
- Key people: Steve Bannon – Founder; Mischaël Modrikamen – Executive director

The Movement is a Brussels-based organization founded by American political strategist Steve Bannon to promote right-wing populist and economic nationalist groups in Europe that are opposed to the European Union governments and political structures of Europe. The organization was expected to hire 10 full-time staff in Brussels before the 2019 European Parliament election. In January 2017, Mischaël Modrikamen, leader of the People's Party in Belgium, officially registered the group.

== Background ==
Bannon initially discussed his plans for the organization with The Daily Beast, saying he wanted to create a populist "supergroup" bloc that could win up to a third of all 700+ Members of the European Parliament seats. He said he thought of the idea when he was invited to speak at an event hosted by Marine Le Pen. Bannon also believes that Sweden's 2018 elections created the perfect timing to launch The Movement.

The Movement stands as a counterpoint to George Soros' Open Society Foundations. Bannon has referred to Soros as "evil but brilliant", and expressed a desire to promote nationalism instead of globalism.

In 2026, Epstein files documents were released that included thousands of text messages between Bannon and Jeffrey Epstein from 2018 and 2019. The messages showed the two discussing efforts to influence international geopolitics, including bolstering European far-right parties.

== Interest and support ==
In July 2018, Bannon and other staff of Donald Trump met with Prime Minister of the Republika Srpska, Željka Cvijanović, in Washington, D.C., attempting to expand influence in the Balkans.

The Movement has attracted the attention of Prime Minister of Hungary, Viktor Orbán, who spoke positively of the group. In September 2018, then Deputy Prime Minister of Italy, Matteo Salvini, joined Bannon's new Eurosceptic network. The UK Independence Party also stated they would work with the group.

Since then, The Movement has also attracted the attention of Geert Wilders, leader of the Party for Freedom, a Eurosceptic opposition party in the Netherlands. Wilders said he arranged to meet Bannon in the Netherlands to discuss the group. Another such contact is Thierry Baudet, leader of another Eurosceptic opposition party in the Netherlands Forum for Democracy.

Their first meeting in July 2018 was organized and attended by Nigel Farage. In September 2018, it was reported that France's National Rally party (formerly National Front), led by Marine Le Pen, would be joining The Movement.

In September 2018, Luigi Di Maio, then leader of the Five Star Movement (M5S), met with Bannon and spoke positively of The Movement, although he remained ambivalent on whether he would join. On 6 September 2019, the M5S formed a pro-European, centre-left government with the Democratic Party, significantly reducing the chances of its joining The Movement.

After launching The Movement, Mischaël Modrikamen promised a January 2019 summit with 20 to 30 groups involved. It did not happen and as of March 2019 there were only three official members, two from Italy: the Brothers of Italy and the coalition party League, and Modrikamen's People's Party in Belgium. This lack of enthusiasm was possibly due to the perceived outside influence of Bannon, or to disagreements over views between the various groups.

In February 2019, it was reported that Eduardo Bolsonaro, the son of Jair Bolsonaro, the then President of Brazil, would be its representative in South America.

In Belgium, the People's Party was dissolved on 18 June 2019, thus ending its affiliation to The Movement.

== Criticism ==
Despite gains made by the group, the co-leader of the Alternative for Germany (AfD), Alexander Gauland, rejected The Movement as an American conception and criticized its projections. He stated that "Mr Bannon will not succeed in forging an alliance of the like-minded for the European elections", citing what he believes to be their diverging viewpoints. The next day, the Freedom Party of Austria's secretary general Harald Vilimsky stated his party, like Gauland's, is also unwilling to cooperate with Bannon, reiterating the party's independence and rejecting American influence in the populist movements of Europe.

In September 2018, UKIP leader Gerard Batten stated that his party has no intentions of joining The Movement, saying UKIP "doesn't fit" into what Bannon proposes across Europe, and the party will instead pursue aims "for the British people". In October 2018, Marine Le Pen, president of National Rally (RN), downplayed Bannon's plans for The Movement, saying that only Europeans would be "the political force behind the EU elections ... to save Europe."

Speaking to the Dziennik Gazeta Prawna in September 2017, Law and Justice (PiS) MEP Karol Karski said that this was not an offer for his party. Karski states that PiS would never support European parties working with Russia, such as AfD or RN. According to Karski, Bannon's offer is "for those who want to smash the EU."

== See also ==
- European Alliance of People and Nations (2019–2024)
- Patriots for Europe (since 2024)
- Politics of the European Union
