= TRUMP (political party) =

Belgian Francophone political party

All United for the Union of Populist Movements Tous Réunis pour l'Union des Mouvements Populistes
- Abbreviation: TRUMP
- Founder: Salvatore Nicotra
- Founded: 7 November 2025
- Preceded by: Chez Nous
- Ideology: Belgian nationalism; Political unitarism; Right-wing populism
- Political position: Far-right

TRUMP (backronym from Tous Réunis pour l'Union des Mouvements Populistes, 'All United for the Union of Populist Movements') is a minor far-right Belgian Francophone political party founded in November 2025 by Salvatore Nicotra. The party's name intentionally references American president Donald Trump, who is claimed to represent the ideals of the party.

== History ==
The party TRUMP was announced to the press on 7 November 2025 by Salvatore Nicotra, a former municipal councillor for Saint-Gilles and chairman of the National Front, as a continuation of the disbanded far-right Francophone party Chez Nous. The party was named after American president Donald Trump in a backronym, in order to capitalize on his popular appeal on the political right. Nicotra had previously lost a legal dispute with Marine Le Pen in 2012 over usage of her image in advertising the National Front. The party was officially inaugurated on 30 November, and intends to run in the 2029 Belgian federal and European Parliament elections.

== Ideology ==
TRUMP is described by several news sources as a far-right political party, while Nicotra declared the party to be a "right-wing populist party with a social dimension. Forty per cent of our programme corresponds with the PTB, forty percent with Vlaams Belang, and twenty per cent is unique. The biggest difference with Vlaams Belang? We are unitary, they are separatist." He also called Donald Trump "the symbol of populism. He immediately shows what we stand for". Le Singulier with AFP reported that the party "intends to be inspired by the Trumpist model". The Times likened Nicotra's initiative to the MAGA movement with reference to its protectionism and conservatism, while Ici.Radio-Canada.ca described him as espousing "anti-immigration discourse". He has additionally spoken out against the cordon sanitaire imposed on far-right political figures in the Francophone media of Belgium.

== See also ==
- Australian Federation Party, Australian political party formerly also named after Trump
