= ISLAM (political party) =

- President: Abdelhay Bakkali Tahiri
- Founder: Redouane Ahrouch
- Founded: 2012
- Headquarters: Brussels, Belgium
- Ideology: Islamism; Shia Islamism; Islamic conservatism Social conservatism
- Religion: Islam
- Colours: Green; White

Website
- www.islam2012.be

ISLAM (backronym for the French: Intégrité - Solidarité - Liberté - Authenticité - Moralité, lit. 'Integrity, Solidarity, Liberty, Authenticity, Morality') is a Belgian Islamist political party. It aims at the establishment of an Islamic state in Belgium and the replacement of the current and historically existing legal system in Belgium (civil law) with Sharia. The party claims to "wait" for Belgium to "inevitably become an Islamic state".

== History ==
The party's founder is Redouane Ahrouch, who helped establish one of the first Shia mosques in Brussels in the early 1990s. He was first active in the Noor party, which had limited success in the parliamentary elections of 1999 (0.15%) and 2003 (0.14%), before continuing his political work more successfully under the new name 'Islam'.

The party was founded with the intention of participating in the 2012 local elections. Lists were submitted in the City of Brussels, Anderlecht and Molenbeek-Saint-Jean. In Anderlecht and Molenbeek, one seat was won with just over 4% of the votes. In Brussels, party chairman Abdelhay Bakkali Tahiri narrowly mised being elected with 2.9% of the votes. Both seats were lost in the 2018 local elections.

In 2013, the party briefly gained a member of the Chamber of Representatives after Laurent Louis defected to the party. Louis, who is not Muslim, had been sitting as an independent member of the Chamber following his expulsion from the right-wing populist People's Party for antisemitism in 2011. Louis soon had a falling out with party leadership, although he continued to claim to be the party's president, with a spokesman for the party noting, "We had been warned that he was not a stable person, but had decided to give him a chance."

In 2014, the party ran lists in the federal and regional elections in Brussels and Liege. They obtained a total of 13,719 votes, or 0.2% of the vote.

In the 2018 local elections, the party obtained 1.8% of the vote in Molenbeek-Saint-Jean and 1.6% in the City of Brussels. In Anderlecht, the party's list had been discarded, preventing Redouane Ahrouch from standing for re-election. As a result, the party no longer has any local councillors.

The party has been condemned for some of its ideology by Belgian politicians, including Olivier Maingain, Theo Francken, and Zuhal Demir.

== Ideology ==
The leaders of the party claim to "fight for the rights of all Muslims". According to Ricardo Gutiérrez, a journalist specializing in religious beliefs, "this party is relatively close to, or in line with, the Iranian Shiites".

In the 2012 Belgian municipal elections, the party focused its program on three specific demands in the field of education: the distribution of halal meals in canteens, the authorization of the wearing of headscarves in schools, and the granting of confessional days off. Subsequently, the demands were extended to other areas, advocating for a healthy economy, a revaluation of work (in particular through a reduction in working hours), a change in the organization of schools (a four-day week, with Friday as a day off and an extension of basic education which would begin a year earlier and take a year off at secondary school) and a decentralised Europe of 750 provinces.

The party also advocates for gender segregation on public transportation.

== See also ==
- List of Islamic political parties
