= Le Peuple =

Belgian Socialist daily newspaper

- Type: Daily
- Founded: 1885
- Political alignment: Socialist (1885–1998); Right-wing (2010–present)
- Language: French language
- Website: http://lepeuple.be/

Le Peuple (French pronunciation: [lə pœpl], The People) was a socialist daily newspaper published in Brussels, Belgium. Publication started on 13 December 1885 and ended in March 1998.

The Le Peuple brand was bought in October 2010 by Mischaël Modrikamen, president of the Belgian People's Party, to become a right-wing online newspaper, as well as a printed bimonthly.

== Socialist newspaper (1885–1998) ==
Le Peuple (literally, The People) was a French language daily newspaper from Brussels, Belgium, which started publication on 13 December 1885. Le Peuple was the central organ of the Belgian Labour Party. Jean Volders was the founding editor-in-chief of the newspaper. Prominent contributors to the newspaper included Emile Vandervelde, Camille Huysmans, Louis Bertrand, J. Wauters, I. Delvigne and Louis de Brouckère. As of 1909, the newspaper was estimated to have a daily circulation of 106,000.

The Le Peuple building on rue des Sables was constructed in 1905, in Art Nouveau style. The architect of the building was Richard Pringiers, a student of Victor Horta.

As of the mid-1930s, Arthur Wauthers was the director of the newspaper. At the time Le Peuple had six different editions. From 1933 to 1935 Le Peuple published a large series of articles by Henri de Man on his 'plannist' ideas.

Under the Second World War, when the socialist movement in Belgium was forced underground, Le Peuple continued to be issued as a clandestine publication. It was distributed across Belgium. Its chief foreign editor at the time was Victor Larock.

In the post-war era Le Peuple was the organ of the Belgian Socialist Party. As of the 1960s, it had a circulation of around 110,000. In 1997 the then loss-making Le Peuple was taken over by the Rossel media group (along with two other socialist dailies, Le Journal de Charleroi and La Wallonie). In the following year these three dailies were merged into Le Matin, but Rossel withdrew from the cooperation. Publication ended in March 1998 following financial problems.

== Right-wing newspaper (2010–) ==
In October 2010, Mischaël Modrikamen, president of the Belgian People's Party, a national liberal and right-wing populist party, reacquired the brand Le Peuple with the intent of publishing a right-wing online newspaper as well as a printed bimonthly. Immediately after this announcement a group of former journalists of the socialist daily tried to block his project by disputing his brand registration. On 13 December he published a first paper issue, printed in 125,000 copies and distributed freely in Brussels and in Wallonia.

On 26 March 2013, after winning his legal dispute against the former journalists, Mischaël Modrikamen officially launched the new online version of Le Peuple. It is published every day at 11am and includes a few articles selected from partner websites (such as Atlantico), as well as a few proprietary articles written by volunteers. In 2014, Luc Rivet, a former journalist at Belgian's national broadcast company RTBF, became its editor-in-chief. He resigns from this position in September 2017
