= Chez Nous (political party) =

Former political party in Belgium

- Leader: Jérôme Munier
- Founders: Jérôme Munier
- Founded: October 2021
- Dissolved: November 2025
- Split from: Reformist Movement; People's Party; Listes Destexhe
- Succeeded by: TRUMP
- Ideology: Anti-immigration; Belgian nationalism National conservatism Identitarianism; Right-wing populism Anti-globalization
- Political position: Far-right
- Flemish affiliation: Vlaams Belang
- Colours: Blue; Gold
- Chamber of Representatives (French-speaking seats): 0 / 61
- Senate (French-speaking seats): 0 / 24
- Walloon Parliament: 0 / 75

Website
- www.cheznous.be

Chez Nous (French: [ʃe nu], lit. 'Our own house') was a Belgian far-right political party founded by Jérôme Munier in October 2021. It was active within the French-speaking Walloon region of the country, and dissolved in November 2025.

== History ==
The party was founded in Herstal by Jérôme Munier and Gregory Vanden Bruel in October 2021, both former members of the People's Party (PP). Chez Nous also brought together former members of the Reformist Movement and the Destexhe Lists.

After its founding, French National Rally leader Jordan Bardella gave the party authorization to use the acronym "FN" as well as a copy of the National Rally flame in the Belgian tricolour. This had previously been the logo and name of the Belgian National Front although other parties were not legally permitted to use the acronym FN. However, Chez Nous said they would use their own name and logo.

Other French-speaking parties in Belgium announced they would impose a cordon sanitaire on the party, similar to the policy used against the Vlaams Belang party. Nevertheless, political communications expert Reinout Van Zandycke noted that of all the parties in Wallonia, Chez Nous had become the most active and popular party on social media and digital spaces by 2023.

Chez Nous participated in the 2024 Belgian federal election, but finished in each province below the 5% required to win a seat, with its highest score being 3.46% in Liège Province. In the concurrent regional elections, Chez Nous won 2.83% of the popular vote and no seats in the Walloon Parliament.

In September 2024, it was reported that the party was on the verge of implosion due to internal conflict, which included an attempt to oust Jérôme Munier. The party nonetheless participated in the 2024 Belgian local elections, where it won one municipal council seat in Mouscron. Salvatore Nicotra, who was previously involved with the party, said that Munier was "nowhere to be seen" three months before the local elections. Following the local elections, Munier was reported to have joined Vlaams Belang in 2025. By November 2025, the party was officially disbanded, and Nicotra announced the TRUMP party as its continuation.

== Supporters ==
Chez Nous was supported by Vlaams Belang, the National Rally and the Dutch Party for Freedom. In 2021, the party and Vlaams Belang entered an agreement in which VB would not field candidates within the French-speaking electorate and instead endorse Chez Nous in Wallonia.

== Ideology ==
Some of the party's positions included:

- The introduction of the citizens' initiative referendum;
- The decrease in the number of ministers;
- The privatization of RTBF;
- The ban on ritual slaughter;
- Tightening of the conditions for granting Belgian citizenship (knowledge of one of the national languages and ten years of residence and work).
- The ban on minarets;
- The introduction of a tax for digital giants;
- The abolition of the Senate.

Political scientist Benjamin Biard has described the party as a Francophone equivalent to Vlaams Belang in certain respects.

== Meetings ==
When it was created, the political party organized a meeting in Herstal but it was canceled despite the authorizations already given by the mayor. According to Chez Nous, 270 people were expected for the event. Several anti-fascist group meetings have taken place in the region in order to cancel the arrival of Chez Nous.

Following this decision, the party still held a press conference in Enghien. Leaders from the Vlaams Belang and the National Rally spoke during the press conference.

On 5 February 2023, a party meeting was to be held in Gilly in the Charleroi region but it was banned by Mayor Paul Magnette one day before it was scheduled to begin.

In March 2023, local left-wing and anti-fascist groups demanded that Namur Mayor Maxime Prévot ban the party from the city and declare Namur an anti-fascist zone. Prévot agreed that Namur should be an anti-fascist city but did not endorse any accompanying motions to censor the party. In June 2023, municipal councilors of the PS, Workers' Party of Belgium, Ecolo and Les Engagés in Mons voted to ban the party from holding events in the city while the Reformist Movement voted against.

On March 30, a party conference was scheduled to again take place in Gilly with guest speakers to include Gerolf Annemans, Virginie Joron and Alice Cordier (co-founder of Collectif Némésis). The event was again banned by Paul Magnette who said it would risk public order. However, co-founder of the party Gregory Vanden Bruel denounced the ban as an attack on democracy. The decision was also attacked by Vlaams Belang who called it "democracy à la PS" and it was also met with some criticism from other Flemish politicians. Chez Nous attempted to hold a new event in Cuesmes, however this was also banned by the Mayor Nicolas Martin after confrontations between police, party members and anti-fascist activists.

On June 9, 2023 the party held a gathering in Liège.

== Media presence ==
Despite restrictions against the party, French media channel TV Libertés held interviews with Jérome Munier. The party also established a large online presence and has moved to form university campus groups.

== Election results ==
=== Chamber of Representatives ===
Election	Leader	Votes	%	Seats	+/-	Government
2024	Jérôme Munier	64,058	0.92	0 / 150	New	Extra-parliamentary

=== Regional ===
==== Walloon Parliament ====
Election	Votes	%	Seats	+/-	Government
2024	58,565	2.83 (#6)	0 / 75	▲	Opposition
