= Rudy Aernoudt =

Belgian academic

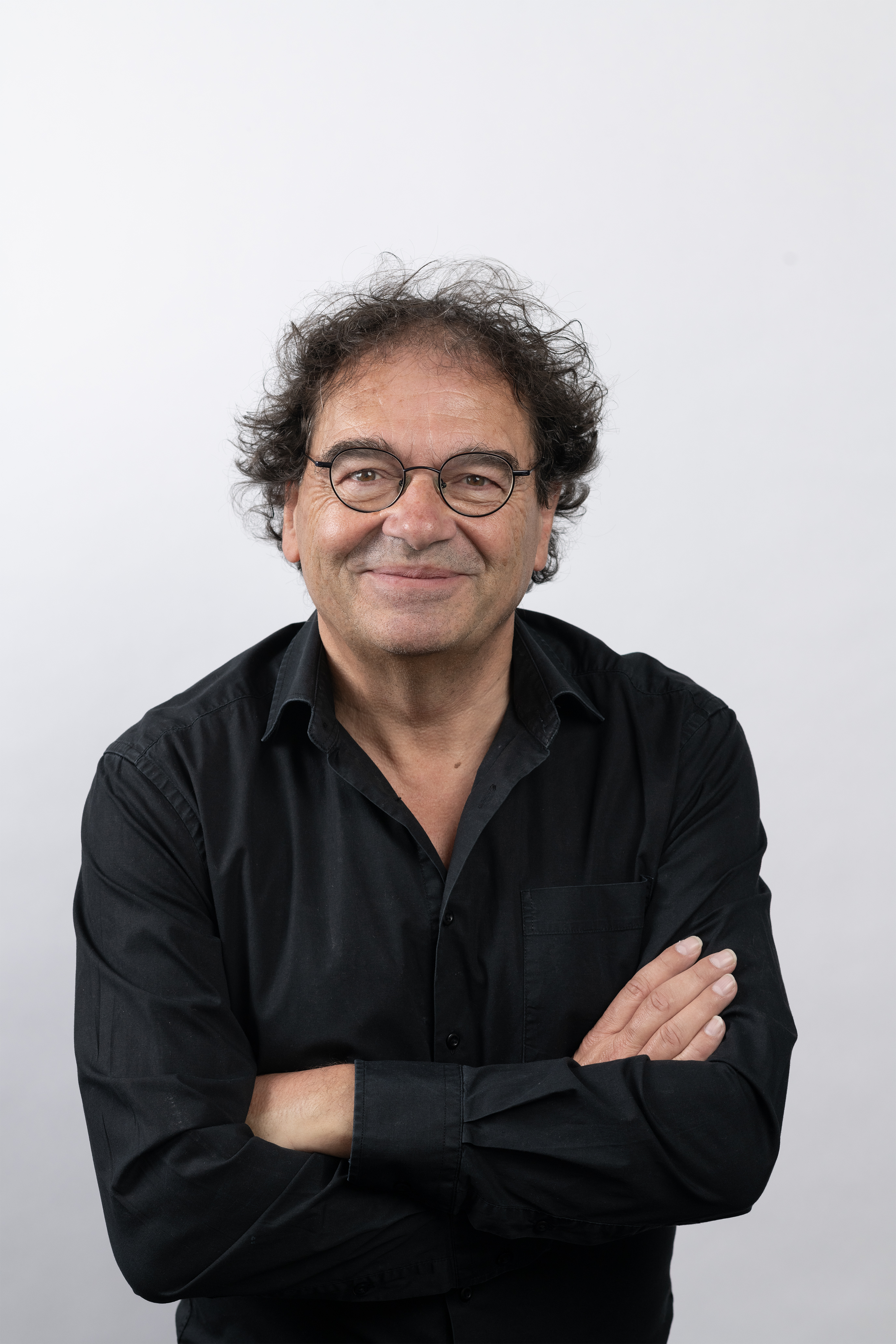

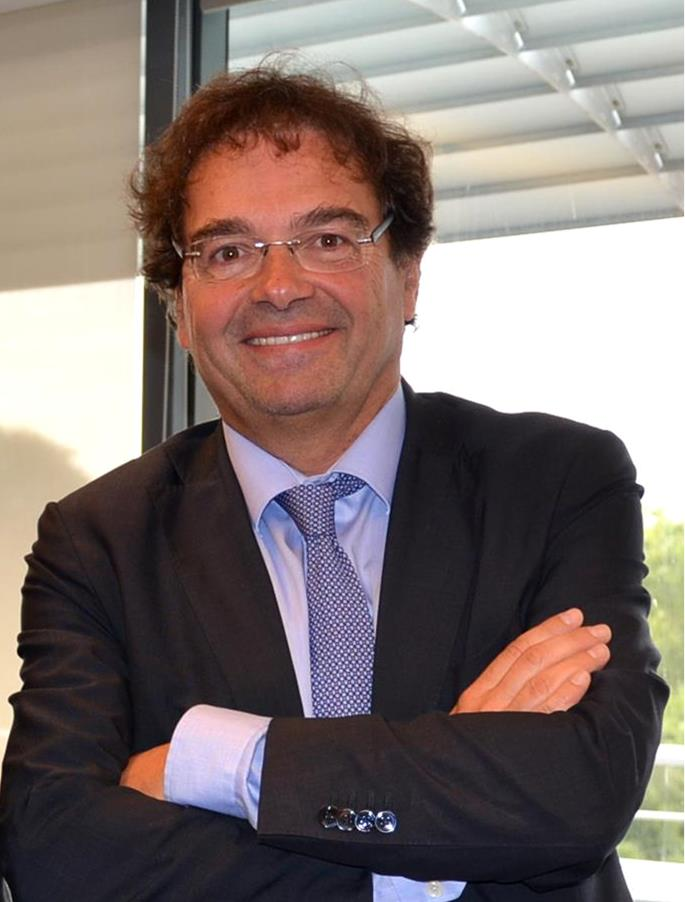
Rudy Aernoudt, Head of Cabinet of the EESC 2013-2015

Rudy Aernoudt is a Belgian professor, writer, politician, economist and philosopher, born in Torhout. He was many times Chief of staff (director of cabinet) of the Ministers of economy and innovation both in Flanders and in Wallonia, of the Belgian Minister of economics and scientific policy and of the President of the European Economic and Social Committee, Henri Malosse. He is the only person to serve as Head of Cabinet at the European, Belgian, Walloon and Flemish levels. He is professor of corporate finance at the Universities of Ghent and Nancy and Professor of Economics, Monetary and Geopolitical Environment for the International Executive MBA, a joint venture of HEC Paris and UCLouvain.

== Professional career ==
Holding master's degree in monetary and industrial economics from KU Leuven, European economics from the College of Europe and Thomistic philosophy from KU Leuven, Rudy Aernoudt began his career as credit manager in the international banking sector before becoming an official in the European Commission, as senior economist (SME financing, scale-up financing, industrial and enterprise policy) and chief economist (space economics). He was member of the foresight task force.

He has written several (over 40) books and articles (500 +) on enterprise finance, on politics, on philosophy and in particular on corruption, its nature, its consequences and how to tackle and prevent it. He even published a by the press well received novel (De Duivelszak) about it.

He is one of the few (probably the only) Belgians to make a career on both sides of the linguistic border being alternately Deputy Head of Cabinet of Serge Kubla, MR Walloon Minister (Francophone liberal right) in 2001–2003, and then Head of Cabinet of Fientje Moerman, OpenVLD federal-level and then Flemish Minister (Dutch-speaking liberal right) in 2003–2006. He writes, following this experience and due to his convictions, the book which will make him known to the general public "Wallonia - Flanders, I love you, me neither" published in 2006. In it, he seeks to dispel the different Flemish clichés on Wallonia and to demonstrate the relevance of the unity of Belgium. This book – a real bestseller – is also a response to the Warande manifesto, a publication by a group of Flemish businessmen and academics, aiming to demonstrate the relevance of Flemish independence from an economic point of view. The same year as he became Secretary-General of the Flemish administration, following his departure from office and his appointment, he denounced embezzlement within his own cabinet with the Minister Fientje Moerman, who was forced to resign. Rudy Aernoudt followed up on this momentum by publishing the following year "Brussels, the unloved child" which insists on the advantages that Brussels offers to Belgium, deemed underexploited.

2007 witnessed the EU crisis and the electoral victory of the cartel CD&V/NVA whose visions of the future of the country radically opposed to those of Rudy Aernoudt. He was thus abruptly let go following an interview published in Le Soir where he questioned the legitimacy of Yves Leterme to lead a reform of the state at the expense of the federal government. The Flemish Government stated that "any collaboration had become impossible". Rudy Aernoudt presented his version of events in "Adventures of a 'cabinettard'" and, after losing the first trial, gets the conviction of the Flemish government.

== Academic career ==
He is considered by the Forum of the Future as one of the best Belgian economists. He is since the age of 28 professor corporate finance and European enterprise policy at the University of Ghent, department of economics and teaches as well at the University of Nancy (Master in European economics). Since 2022, he is affiliate professor at the BMI executive MBA, a joint venture of LMS-Leuven and HEC Paris, ranked best executive MBA in Belgium and 26th in Western Europe. From 2007 to 2010, he was also a lecturer at the University of Liège of a course in Dutch entitled "Introduction to good governance" (Inleiding tot goed bestuur), whose neutrality was questioned by the Belgian Movement of Young Socialists. He was a guest professor at the Technical University of Brno at the Czech Republic. He was member of the board of the Flemish Inter-university Council and the Fund for Scientific Research. He is vice-President of the World Complexity Science Academy.

He was director-general of OLPC, a spin-off of the Massachusetts Institute of Technology (MIT). He is a regular speaker at TEDx events on topics as the (non)sense of economy

His courses financial management, based on his book financial management in Practice, has been selected by HSTalks in 2023.

Aernoudt has written several books advocating for Belgian federal unity, a position uncommon among Flemish public figures. Whether you agree or disagree with his ideas, Rudy Aernoudt appears as an intelligent man, offering creative ideas and supporting his conclusions with advanced technical analysis. Far from being an ordinary speaker, he is an excellent speaker with explosive humour.". He is considered as Flemish Francophile, unclassifiable and flamboyant.

== The father of Business Angels and the Zebra-economy in Europe ==
He co-founded EBAN, the European Business angel network. He is senator ambassador and European chair of the World Business Angels Investment Forum. He received from WBAIF President Baybar Altunas the award for advancing the agenda for World Business Angels. In April 2013, he became the Head of Cabinet of the President of the European Economic and Social Committee, the Frenchman Henri Malosse. He thus became the only Belgian to have served as Head of Cabinet at the European, national (Belgian) and regional (Wallonia and Flanders) levels. In 2025 he was appointed, for the fifth time is his life, head of Cabinet, this tie to the President of the MR, GL Bouchez. He conceived and launched an SBIC-inspired investment initiative at the Commission called ESCALAR, that supports venture capital and growth financing for promising companies, enabling them to scale up in Europe and help reinforce Europe's economic and technological sovereignty, which he explained for instance at Euronews. He is member of the advisory board of MCCapital and co-founder of the SID (Sustainable Innovation Durable) -Fund.

== Political courage ==
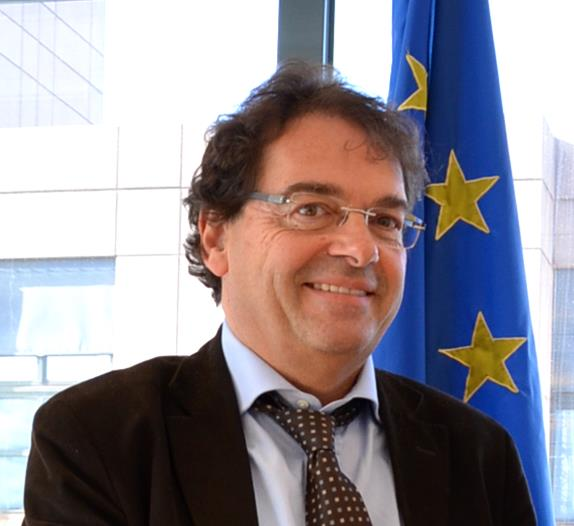
Rudy Aernoudt in 2013

Rudy Aernoudt continued his political battle in 2008 by creating a bilingual movement, "België Anders/La Belgique Autrement" (Belgium differently), which organized a series of conferences. He teaches in different universities (Ghent, Brussels) and became director-general of OLPC, a spin-off from MIT.

In 2008, he created the LiDE think-tank to become, in November 2009, Co-Chair of the Popular Party, a political party that has enjoyed rapid success but was a victim of internal tensions. He wanted to make an alliance with the MR but the FDF vetoed by threatening to leave the MR as Aernoudt was considered too Belgicist. Aernoudt is considered to be the architect of this separation. Aernoudt was confirmed with an overwhelming majority of 28,000 votes but left active politics; at least in terms of political parties.

For his political positions, Rudy Aernoudt has received several awards, among which the prestigious award of the French community Aron - Condorcet, the price for best European entrepreneurship program, the prize for political courage at Belgian level B+ and WBAIF-award for advancing the agenda for World Business Angels. He is a special advisor at the World Diplomatic Institute; board member of the Freson-Horta Foundation and X-Squared gender ambassador. As he is a wine-lover and wine-connoisseur, he is inducted as Chevalier de la Baronnie liégeoise des Costes du Rhône.

== Author and columnist ==
Rudy Aernoudt is a well-known and critical columnist at different magazines (FD-Magazine, Trends, Made in, etc.) and publishes his columns on a weekly basis. Moreover he published over 500 papers in economic journals and over 40 books on politics, economics and philosophy.

- "L'Europe, stop ou encore, avec Henri Malosse, Mardaga, 2026"
- "Belgium 2040, with Peter De Keyzer, Ertsbergh, 2026"
- "Financial Management, From Unicorns to Zebra's, Athena Publishers, 2026".
- Entrepreneurship, A Mindset, Athena Publishers, 2025".
- "Financieel Management, Toegepast, Larcier-Intersentia, Cambridge, 2023"
- "Financial Management in Practice, Larcier-Intersentia, Cambridge, 2023"
- "Towards a New European Impetus Post-Brexit, A view behind the scenes, Intersentia, Cambridge,2023"
- "Europa, een blik achter de schermen, Intersentia, 2022"
- "L'Europe, vue de l'intérieur, vers un nouvel élan?, Mardaga, 2022"
- "Entrepreneurship, no guts, no Glory, Intersentia Cambridge, 2020"
- "Coronavirus: electroshock for Belgium, Van Gompel @ Scavina, 2020"
- "Coronavirus: electrochoc pour la Belgique? Mardaga, 2020"
- "Entrepreneurship, A way of life, Intersentia, 2015
- "Wake-Ups Belgians", Roularta Books, 2012
- De Duivelszak, Roularta Books, 2012, ISBN 9789086794584.
- Leven zonder job - Van jobtaker naar jobmaker, Roularta Books, 2011, 211p, ISBN 9789086793914.
- La politique, ça trompe énormément - Descente aux enfers politiques, Roularta Books, 2008, 270 p, ISBN 9086792529.
- Peripeties d'un Cabinettard - l'Abus de Pouvoir, Roularta Books, 2008, 191 p, ISBN 9054664673.
- Comment l'état gaspille votre argent : Mauvaise gestion, clientélisme ... en finir, Roularta Books, 2008, ISBN 9789086791699.
- Bruxelles : l’enfant mal aimé, Roularta Books/VIF éd, 2007, 180 p, ISBN 9054664673.
- Wallonie - Flandre, Je t'aime moi non plus, Roularta Books, 2006, 250 p, ISBN 9789086790364.
- Arbeid, Lust of Last ?, Roularta Business Books, 2005, 121 p, ISBN 9054668377.
- Bazel II, Hoe er voordeel uit halen ?, Intersentia, 2005, 145 p, ISBN 9789050954532.
- L'éloge du (non) travail, L'Harmattan, 2005, 130 p, ISBN 2747586278.
- Ondernemingsfinanciering, over bankkredieten, business angels en risicokapitaal, Roularta Business Books 2004, 328 p, ISBN 9054667052.
- Corporate Finance Yearbook 2004, Chief Editor, Intersentia, Antwerp-Oxford-New York 2003, 250 p, ISBN 9789050853101.
- Corruption à foison, L'Harmattan, Paris, 2003, 150 p, ISBN 2747552004.
- European Enterprise policy, From SME policy to entrepreneurship policy, Intersentia, Antwerp-Oxford-New York, 2003, ISBN 9050952933.
- The taste of entrepreneurship: Financing and Research, proceedings of the European conference, Chief Editor, Roularta books, 2003, 110 p. (fr)(en), ISBN 9054666137.
- Business Angels, Rare vogels of ware engelen ?, avec H. Goossens, Roularta Business Books, 2002, 145 p, ISBN 9054667400.
- Corporate Finance Yearbook, Chief Editor, Intersentia, Antwerp-Oxford-New York 2002, 250 p, ISBN 9789050952088.
- La Paresse économique, pour en finir avec la troisième voie, Vif-L'express, 2002, 95 p, ISBN 9054665416.
- Verdien Risicokapitaal, avec E. Lacroix, B. Huybrechts, et al., Intersentia, 2002, 144 p, ISBN 9054666021.
- Duurzaam ondernemen in de Europese Context, Garant Éditions, 2001, 230 p, ISBN 9044111647.
- Financing SMEs, the European Approach, proceedings of the European Conference, Chief Editor, Roularta Books, 2001, 222 p. (fr)(en), ISBN 9054664916.
- Bedrijfsfinanciering, een benadering vanuit de praktijk, Roularta business books, 2000, 220 p, ISBN 9054664533.
- Waarom corruptie welig tiert ?, Roularta Business Books, 2000, 145 p, ISBN 905466455X.
- Waarom het Konijn eruitziet als een eend ? pleidooi voor een nieuw sociaal én economisch model, Roularta Business books, 1998, 110p, ISBN 9054663685.
- La Politique Structurelle en Europe, avec Richard Skrzypczak, collection Réflexe Europe, documentation française, 1998, 230 p, ISBN 2110035951.
