= Victor Larock =

Belgian politician (1904–1977)

Victor Joseph Léonard Larock (6 October 1904, in Ans – 24 April 1977, in Madrid) was a Belgian politician for the country's Socialist Party.

== Biography ==
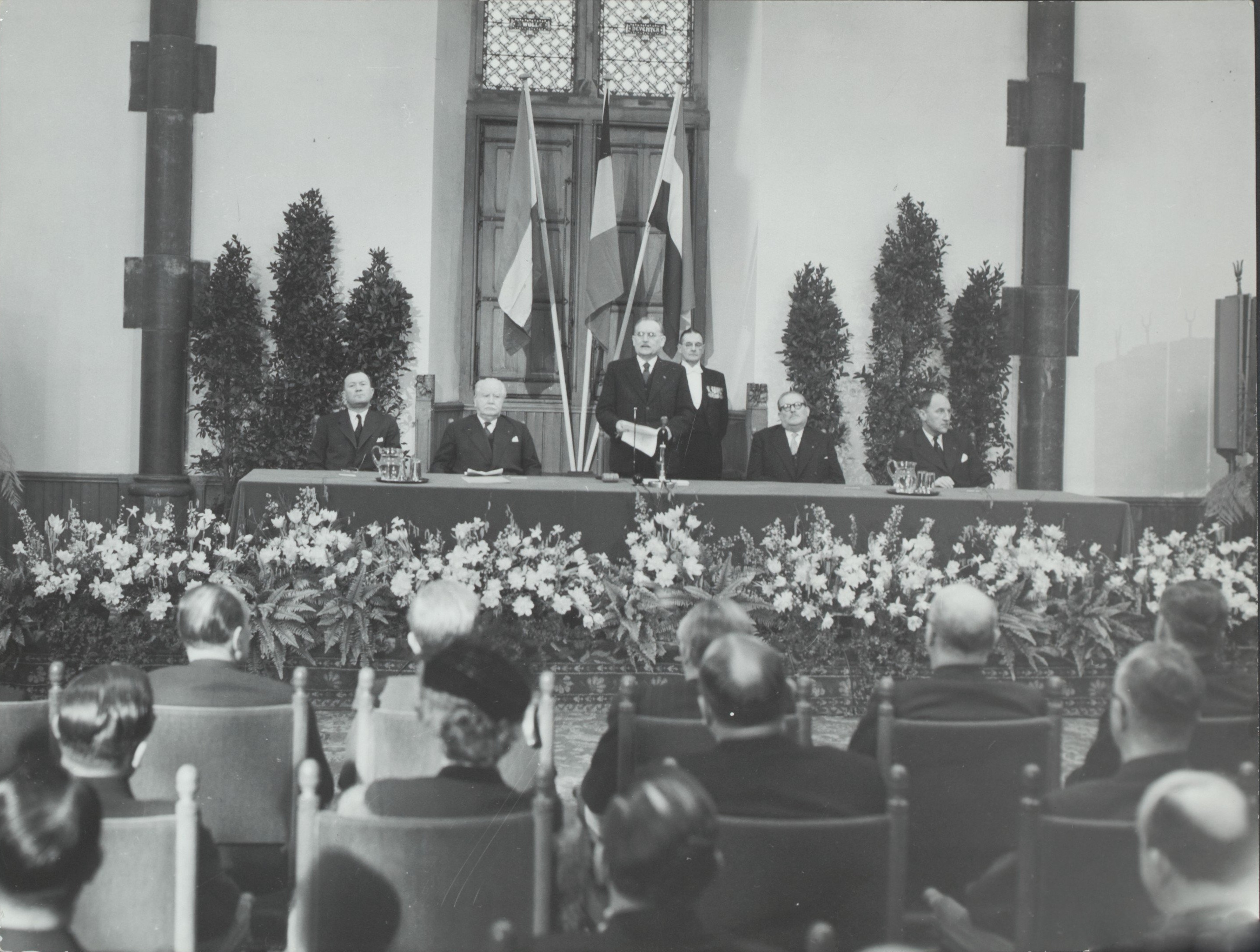
Benelux conference at The Hague in 1958. Speech of Willem Drees. From left to right: Larock, Joseph Bech, Drees, Achiel Van Acker, and Joseph Luns.

Larock was the son of a miner. He obtained his doctor's title in literature and philosophy at the University of Liège in 1926 and in sociology at the Sorbonne. During his studies of sociology in Paris he first came in contact with the leftist intellectuals there. From 1932 to 1949 he was a lecturer in history at the Royal Atheneum of Ixelles and the Institut des Hautes Etudes in Ghent.

From the mid-1930s until the eve of the Second World War, he was the editor of several left-leaning magazines. During the war, he clandestinely continued his occupation. He was briefly arrested in 1941 but did not cease his editorial activities. At the time of the liberation from Nazi German occupation he was editor of Le Peuple, a job which he took over from Bracops, who was arrested.

After the war, Larock became one of the main actors at the first postwar Belgian Socialist Party congress and became a member of the national party administration. He opposed the return of King Leopold III, who decided against participation at the side of the allied powers during the war, contrary to the government in exile. His articles in Le Peuple were major elements in the campaign against Leopold. This so-called Royal Question was resolved by the King's abdication in favour of his son Baudouin of Belgium. He also became a representative of Belgium to the Parliamentary Assembly of the Council of Europe, from 1949 to 1950, then until 1953 as a substitute. There, he argued in favour of developing cultural cooperation between its members in a 1949 resolution, declaring that European culture "is at one and the same time a synthesis and the source of diversity."

Larock pleaded in favour of a new Socialist International which materialised in 1951. He was a member of its board until 1954. By 1954 he was Minister of Foreign Trade at the fourth government of Achiel Van Acker. At the same government, he moved to the portfolio of Foreign Affairs until 1958. He replaced his socialist Paul-Henri Spaak who became Secretary-General of NATO. After his stint at Foreign Affairs, he became the first President of the Council of the European Communities. He rented a building belonging to insurance company Royale Belge at Avenue de la joyeuse entrée 23-27 in Brussels to provisionally accommodate the administration of the European Economic Community. This laid the groundwork for Brussels as a capital of the European Union. In his opening address at the EEC and Euratom Councils on 25 January 1958, Larock identified both Communities as a step toward a future integrated European union. "The greatest service which the European Community can perform for the free world", he stated, "is to give work to those who have none, to generate affluence and to enable all those who help to create it to enjoy it."

Larock's last ministerial position was at the government of Théo Lefèvre as the Minister of National Education and Culture. On 31 July 1963 he resigned because he did not agree with Arthur Gilson's new law on the use of language in education. From 1965 to 1968, he led the socialist fraction in the Chamber of Representatives and became the President of the Socialist International in 1964.

He was born in Ans and died in Madrid.

== Football ==
In 1919 he became a member of the football club R.R.F.C. Montegnée and was a striker between 1921 and 1930 until the club moved to the First Division, when he quit.

== Publicaties ==
- La pensée mythique, Brussels, 1945.
- Un aspect de la question royale. A quand la lumière?, Brussels, 1948.
- La grande cause. Chroniques, Ghent, 1953.
- Éloge de la folie, Brussels, 1957 (annotated translation of In Praise of Folly).
- Larock, Victor (1930). "Les premières conceptions psychologiques des Grecs". Revue Belge de Philologie et d'Histoire. 9 (2): 377–406. doi:10.3406/rbph.1930.6695.
- Larock, Victor (1946). "The Socialist Party". The Annals of the American Academy of Political and Social Science. 247 (1): 12–16. doi:10.1177/000271624624700104. S2CID 144251039.

== Sources ==
- Biography
