= Declaration of Revision of the Constitution =

A Declaration of Revision of the Constitution (Dutch: Verklaring tot herziening van de Grondwet, French: Déclaration de révision de la Constitution) in Belgium is a declaration that must be passed in order to amend the Belgian Constitution. In accordance with Title VIII of the Constitution, the federal legislative power, which consists of the King and the bicameral Federal Parliament, has the right to declare that there are reasons to amend the constitutional provisions it determines. This is done by means of two Declarations of Revision of the Constitution, one adopted by the Chamber of Representatives and the Senate, and one signed by the King and the Federal Government.

Following this declaration, the Federal Parliament is automatically dissolved and a new federal election must take place. This makes it impossible to amend the Constitution unless an election has intervened. Following the election, the new Federal Parliament can amend those provisions that have been declared revisable. Only the articles of the Constitution listed in both declarations are revisable.

The first such declaration was made in 1892, triggering the 1892 elections, and the second one in 1919. In recent decades however, such declaration has become a regular way to call elections: all national/federal elections since 1985 have been called by declaration of revision of the Constitution.

The Constitution of Luxembourg (in its article 114) had a similar procedure for constitutional revision, until 2003, when it was simplified.

== See also ==
- Constitution of Belgium
