= Brecht Vermeulen =

Belgian politician (born 1969)

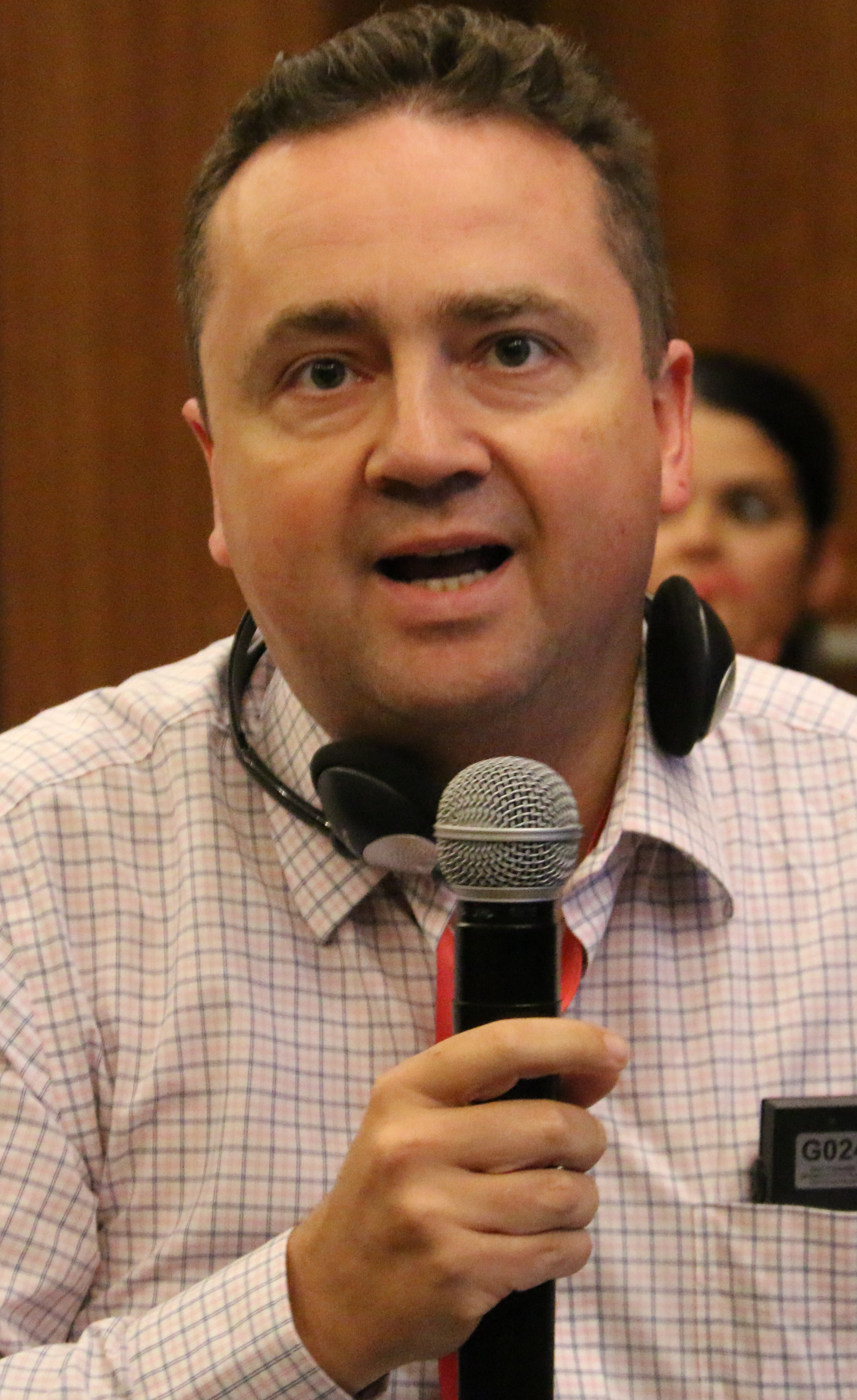
- Vermeulen in 2016

Member of the Chamber of Representatives
- In office 25 May 2014 – 26 May 2019

Member of the Municipal councilor of Roeselare
- Incumbent
- Assumed office 2013

Personal details
- Born: 17 June 1969 (age 56) Roeselare, Belgium
- Party: N-VA (2001-); Volksunie (before 2001)

Brecht Vermeulen (born 6 June 1969) is a Belgian entrepreneur and politician who was a member of the Belgian Chamber of Representatives for the Flemish nationalist New Flemish Alliance party.

He is the former chairman of the K.S.V. Roeselare football club.

== Biography ==
Vermeulen was born in Roeselare. He studied economics at the Universitaire Faculteiten Sint-Ignatius Antwerpen (UFSIA) (now part of the University of Antwerp) and then a degree in international politics at the University of Antwerp. During this studies, he served as president of the conservative Katholiek Vlaams Hoogstudentenverbond student society and later served as secretary of the Flemish People's Movement (VVB), of which Peter De Roover was then general chairman.

After graduating, he became a managing director for housing company DeMandel and then a project director for the Durabrik Group development firm. He then worked as a real estate broker. In 1999, he became a treasurer of the football club KSK Roeselare and helped to supervise its merger with KFC Roeselare to become KSV Roeselare. He served as the club's treasurer for several years before becoming its manager until the club's disbandment.

In 2012, he was elected as a municipal councilor for the Flemish N-VA party in Roeselare. In the 2014 Belgian federal election, Vermeulen headed the party's list for the West Flanders constituency and was elected to the Chamber of Representatives. In November 2014, he was appointed chairman of the Committee of Home Affairs in the Chamber and sat on the board of the political reform group.

Vermeulen stood in the 2019 Belgian federal election but was replaced as the list puller for West Flanders by Sander Loones. Despite a good score on preference votes, he lost his seat after the N-VA saw losses in the region to Vlaams Belang.

In 2020, Vermeulen left politics to take up a company director position in the private sector.

Outside of politics, Vermeulen is a bagpipe player with the Field Marshal Haig's Own Pipes & Drums and Flemish Caledonian Pipes and Drums Clan MacKenzie societies. He played at the wedding of N-VA leader Bart De Wever. During the COVID-19 pandemic in Belgium, he began playing bagpipes daily at 8pm and uploading videos on YouTube in support of health workers caring for COVID patients.
