= People's Party (Belgium) =

People's Party Parti populaire (French) Volkspartij (Dutch)
- Leader: Mischaël Modrikamen
- Founded: 26 November 2009
- Dissolved: 18 June 2019
- Merger of: LiDé
- Merged into: Chez Nous
- Headquarters: Avenue Molière 144; 1050 Brussels
- Ideology: Right-wing populism; Euroscepticism
- Political position: Far-right; 2009–2016: Right-wing
- European affiliation: Alliance for Direct Democracy in Europe (2014–2016)
- International affiliation: The Movement
- Colours: Purple Orange

The People's Party (French: Parti populaire [paʁti pɔpylɛːʁ], PP; Dutch: Volkspartij) was a political party in Belgium. Primarily a French-speaking party, it considered itself to be to the right of the Reformist Movement, the main centre-right party in Francophone Belgium. It was often considered as a right-wing populist party. From 2016 onwards, it was considered as far-right by the Centre de recherche et d'information socio-politiques.

The PP was founded on 26 November 2009 by Rudy Aernoudt and Mischaël Modrikamen, inspired in part by the examples of the People's Party in Spain and the Union for a Popular Movement in France. The PP considers itself to be economically liberal in the European sense of the term. The party's manifesto emphasizes efficiency and disinterestedness in governance, plain speaking, and individual autonomy. The PP aimed to reform the justice system and to strengthen the Belgian federal government relative to the regions and communities.

In its first electoral test, the 2010 Belgian general election, the PP won 84,005 votes (1.29% of the national total) and returned Laurent Louis as its first Member of Parliament for Walloon Brabant. The PP list for the Senate, headed by Rudy Aernoudt, took 98,858 votes (1.53% nationally) but failed to return a Senator. The party also discussed a joint venture with the Flemish Libertair, Direct, Democratisch party, but ultimately the two parties chose not to collaborate.

Aernoudt and Modrikamen had a public falling-out in August 2010. Laurent Louis had publicly supported the policy of Nicolas Sarkozy in deporting Roma people from France. These comments provoked the indignation of both Aernoudt and the leaders of the PP's youth wing, but Modrikamen did not join in their call for Louis to apologize, and Aernoudt was expelled from the party. Aernoudt disputed the legality of his expulsion, and also criticized Modrikamen's call for a "Plan B" (an independent Wallonia-Brussels) as a betrayal of the party's federalist identity. Aernoudt also publicly accused Modrikamen of financial misdeeds. The rupture leaves the future of the party uncertain. The People's Party is supportive of Israel.

Mischael Modrikamen, president of the People's Party, has reiterated after the regional elections in 2012 the interest to offer a partnership with the Flemish party, the New Flemish Alliance (N-VA), to transform Belgium into a confederal state in 2014.

In 2014 the PP won 1 seat in the chamber of representatives and 1 seat in the Walloon Parliament. The PP reached more than 10% in some cantons. However Mischaël Modrikamen did not get a seat in the chamber of representatives. The PP participated in the European elections for the first time but did not get a seat despite the score of Luc Trullemans.

The party was dissolved by unanimous vote of the party members present on the 18 June 2019 party congress.

Following the dissolution of the part, some former PP members announced their invention to create a new party called La Droite (The Right) and reportedly reached out to Alain Destexhe and his Listes Destexhe party for collaboration. In 2021, former PP members helped to establish and merged remaining PP structures into the new Chez Nous (With Us) party alongside former Listes Destexhe and Reformist Movement members.

== Electoral results ==
=== Federal Parliament ===
==== Chamber of Representatives ====
Election year	# of overall votes	% of overall vote	% of language group vote	# of overall seats won	# of language group seats won	+/-	Notes
2010	84,005	1.3		1 / 150	1 / 62	New	in opposition
2014	102,599	1.51	(#13)	1 / 150	1 / 62	0	in opposition
2019	75,096	1.11	(#13)	0 / 150	0 / 62	▼1	in opposition

==== Senate ====
Election year	# of overall votes	% of overall vote	% of language group vote	# of overall seats won	# of language group seats won	+/-	Notes
2010	98,858	1.5		0 / 40	0 / 15		
2014	N/A	N/A	N/A (#13)	0 / 60	0 / 15	0	
2019	N/A	N/A	N/A (#13)	0 / 60	0 / 15	0	

=== Regional parliaments ===
==== Walloon Parliament ====
Election year	# of overall votes	% of overall vote	% of language group vote	# of overall seats won	+/-	Notes
2014	98,840	4.89	(#6)	1 / 75	New	in opposition
2019	74,622	3.67	(#7)	0 / 75	▼1	in opposition

==== Brussels Parliament ====
Election year	# of overall votes	% of overall vote	% of language group vote	# of overall seats won	+/-	Notes
2014	7,942	1.94	(#8)	0 / 89	New	
2019	6,605	1.70	(#8)	0 / 89	0	

=== European Parliament ===
Election year	# of overall votes	% of overall vote	% of language group vote	# of overall seats won	+/-	Notes
2014	145,538	2.18	5.98 (#5)	0 / 21	New	
2019	113,793	1.69	4.66 (#7)	0 / 21	0	

== Notable figures ==
- Luc Trullemans
- Mischaël Modrikamen
- Michel Renquin
