= Mischaël Modrikamen =

Belgian right-wing politician and lawyer

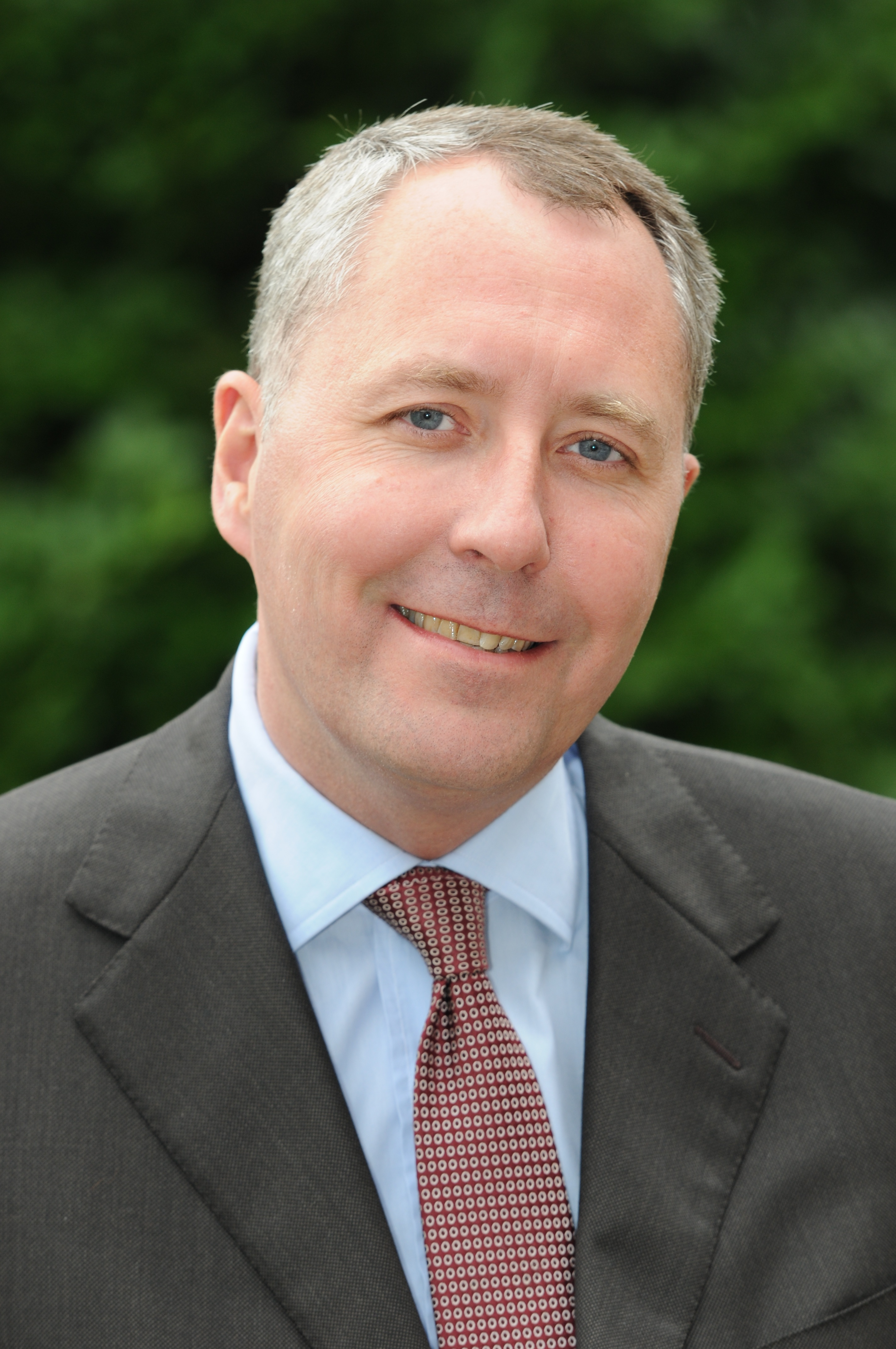
- Modrikamen in 2011
- Born: 22 February 1966 (age 60); Charleroi, Belgium
- Occupations: Lawyer, politician, publisher
- Known for: Leader of the People's Party

Mischaël Modrikamen (born 22 February 1966) is a Belgian right-wing politician and lawyer. He is the co-founder and leader of the People's Party. He is the vice-president of the Alliance for Direct Democracy in Europe (ADDE) and the publisher of Le Peuple.

== Early life and career ==
Mischaël Modrikamen was born to a Jewish father, Marcel Modrikamen, and a Christian mother, Raymonde Legroux. Modrikamen has stated that it was his Christian mother to bring him and his father closer to Judaism, urging them to go to the synagogue. His father, son of a Jewish immigrant from Poland who fled anti-Semitism, was arrested by the Gestapo as a member of the Belgian Resistance during World War II. He became a political leader and trade unionist in Charleroi after the war. On 18 February 1991, Marcel Modrikamen was victim of a gun attack. He died a few years later of his injuries. According to his son, his father discovered irregularities in the Gailly Institute, a Belgian hospital situated in Wallonia. This may have been the reason for the attack.

Modrikamen went to school at Couillet and then Charleroi before going to Université libre de Bruxelles (ULB) where he studied Law and graduated magna cum laude.

== Legal career ==
After a year as trainee with the top American firm Akin Gump Strauss Hauer & Feld, he then moved to Stibbe where he finished his pupilage. He then founded his own firm in 1993, at the age of 27. Modrikamen Law firm became one of the most respected firms for corporate and finance litigation in Belgium.

Mischaël Modrikamen became a specialist in representing shareholders and investors in Belgium in complex corporate litigations. He led major procedures that have marked the recent economic history of Belgium, notably the Fortis case.

In 1997, Modrikamen won the first landmark case against lead managers of a Eurobond issue (Confederation Life case). The ruling has since determined the scope of liability for this activity in Europe. He recovered over 200 million euros for bondholders. In 1999 and 2000, he forced the board of target companies in takeover battles to make public the conflict of interests of certain of its members (Suez-Tractebel Case and BNP Paribas-Cobepa case). In 1999, Modrikamen has won the largest award ever granted in Belgium which led to a 3 billion euros payment in favour of cooperative shareholders of two merging banks (KBC-CERA merger case).

In 2001, Mischaël Modrikamen represented the Belgian Jewish Community in the negotiation with the banking and insurance sector for looted assets during World War II, securing a 110 million euros settlement.

In 2002, he sued Total and Petrofina on behalf of minority shareholders after the forced squeeze out of Petrofina shareholders and won preliminary injunctions placing shares under a custodian and appointing experts to assess the share price. At the same time, Mischaël Modrikamen has been representing clients in significant transactions for the country, notably in the creation of an independent Electricity grid (a 5 billion euros transaction in 2002), or in the creation of SN Brussels Airlines in 2003 (the national aviation company).

In 2003, he represented shareholders of the National Bank after expropriation of the gold reserves by the Belgian State and in 2005, he represented the activist fund Knight Vincke which forced Suez lo launch a takeover bid on Electrabel, after having obtained a preliminary ruling in favor of the shareholders. In 2007, he obtained the first cancellation award ever granted by the Brussels court of Appeal, nullifying a decision of the competition watchdog (Echo case). In 2008, he represented Fortis shareholders fighting the dismantling of the group. He obtained the suspension of the transaction and the convening of general meetings of shareholders to vote on these transactions. As a result of his action, Fortis was able to retain its insurance arm Ageas. The Belgian government was consequently forced to resign.

In December 2010, Mischaël Modrikamen announced that he would focus on the renovation of the Belgian political life. He announced that he would put an end to his firm and separated from its team of 10 lawyers. He would however lead the Fortis case to its term and retain some limited advising and consultancy activities. In 2013, he nevertheless engaged in a high-profile battle against RTL Belgium who fired weather forecaster Luc Trullemans. Trullemans had posted critical comments about immigration on Facebook, after a road-traffic incident allegedly involving the immigrant community, although RTL claimed that Trullemans initiated the incident. RTL Belgium had accused Trullemans of racist comments. Modrikamen sued RTL Belgium for libel before the commercial court of Brussels and obtained 1 euro in damages by judicial decision of 24 December 2013. RTL Belgium did not appeal.

== Political career ==
In November 2002, Mischaël Modrikamen was a vocal critic of Islamism seeing it as a threat to democracy and the west seeing the situation as equivalent to appeasement of the Nazis in the 1930s. After criticizing what he considered the absence of vision of most Belgian politicians in the Fortis case as well as the absence of a truly conservative party on the Belgian French-speaking political scene, Mischaël Modrikamen announced in June 2009, that he would launch his own political movement.

=== Founding the People's Party ===
On 26 November 2009, Modrikamen launched the People's Party (PP,) which, he claimed, was based on the values of justice, responsibility and solidarity. Without substantial funding and with limited access to the media, especially TV debates preceding the elections, the People's Party nevertheless obtained more than 4% of the vote in Brussels and Wallonia and its first Member of Parliament. Some French media, with considerable exaggeration, named him "the Belgian Sarkozy". After the elections, the King consulted Mischaël Modrikamen, along with all the other party leaders, as part of the standard process of assessing the political situation.

In November 2010, Mischaël Modrikamen criticized "reasonable accommodations" when applied with a religious purpose. According to him, adjustments based on religion are "unreasonable" because they tend "to impose multicultural and intercultural values". Moreover, these adjustments are "too influenced by Muslim demands" that are threatening non-negotiable values such as the equality of women and men and the separation between state and religion.

By the end of November 2010, Mischaël Modrikamen announced that the People's Party would be the first French-speaking party to take a confederalist stance in the current political debate.

In June 2010, Modrikamen claimed that a "zero tolerance policy" was efficient and had decreased Cureghem's crime rate by 30%. (Cureghem is a Brussels neighbourhood). In August 2011, Modrikamen reacted to the riots that took place in several cities around England. In the newspaper Le Soir, he said this situation was the "premise of a civil war led by minorities". On 2 September 2011, Mischaël Modrikamen declared on Twizz Radio that "Islam as a private religion causes no particular problems, but that Islamism could be a form of fascism ". According to him, a part of the immigrant population "refuses the values on which Europe was built". "We use a plain language which is bothering the established parties. A language that the population has been waiting for so long", he added.

=== Launching Le Peuple ===
At the end of 2010, he had made public that he would launch a new daily online newspaper with a bimonthly printed version under the name Le Peuple. Le Peuple was one of the oldest title of the Belgian press and belonged initially to the socialist party. Its publication had started on 13 December 1885, and ended in March 1998 because of financial problems. Immediately after this announcement a group of former journalists of Le Peuple tried to block this project by challenging his brand registration. Their action was definitively dismissed by a court of appeal decision issued in 2012. Modrikamen relaunched the daily publication in March 2013. The publication reached 4 million page views by the end of 2014.

=== 2014 elections ===
In May 2014, Belgium held European, Regional and Federal elections. The PP was largely ignored and even boycotted by the press, which Modrikamen claimed was in violation of its legal duty to pluralism. The Parti Populaire nevertheless reached 6% at the European election and just less than 5% at the Regional and federal election, which Modrikamen ascribed to the energetic action of its militants. The Parti Populaire managed to get 2 MPs elected. The threshold of 5 percent imposed to the lists in each multi-member constituency limited the gain in seats. Modrikamen announced that it was prepared to participate in the center-right coalition that was formed afterwards but the MR, the main centrist French-speaking party, refused such coalition with the PP. Modrikamen claimed that this was in order to keep a maximum of ministerial posts for itself but the very small representation of his party in parliament made its participation improbable in any case.

=== International Alliance and contacts ===
Early 2015, The Parti Populaire formed the Alliance For Direct Democracy in Europe (ADDE) with the UKIP, VNL, Debout la Republique, the Swedish Democrats and various other individual MPs. Modrikamen was appointed vice-President. The alliance is a euro-sceptic movement which claims to aim at reinforcing a "Europe of the peoples and sovereign nations".

In March 2015, Modrikamen was invited on an official visit to Russia by the Russian government and met officials at the Duma. Modrikamen, himself a strong believer in the transatlantic alliance, nevertheless announced that "we" should find some accommodation with Russia on the Crimea and Ukraine crisis. He believes that the West and Russia have today common enemies to fight, such as ISIS, and that this should be a priority. In April 2015, Modrikamen visited Sicily at the invitation of local authorities in order to assess the migrants' crisis. He called for a strong policy in order to avoid millions of unqualified migrants crossing the Mediterranean sea, taking into account the terrorist threat and the very high unemployment rate in Europe. He emphasized that 45 million Europeans are already jobless according to official data. Modrikamen strongly opposes President Junker's proposal to ease migration restrictions and qualifies them, like Nigel Farage of UKIP, as "one of the most serious threats to our civilisation".

=== Warning against jihadists and terrorism threats ===
In August 2015, Modrikamen was invited to speak in front of Congressmen and Senators at the Heritage Foundation in Washington. He made a dire description of the true situation of Belgium and Brussels, with the consequences of Muslim immigrations, Islamic fundamentalism, violence and the rise of anti-Semitism. Although his party represents between 6 and 9% according to the last polls, Modrikamen is de facto banned from TV programs in Belgium. He did not appear on the main private channel, RTL Television, since November 2010. He is invited to speak once every two years on the public channel, RTBF.

The last times he appeared in 2014, on RTBF TV, he warned against weakness from the authorities, warning the Belgian Vice-Prime minister, Didier Reynders, that he and other politicians would have soon "blood of innocent people" on their hands since they allowed jihadists to return freely to Belgium and Europe.

In another TV debate, he warned Belgium against the fact that jihadists hide themselves as "refugees" to penetrate Europe. He was rebuked with sarcasms by mainstream politicians and "experts". Less than two months later, a terrorist attack targeted the Bataclan compound in Paris, killing 130 people and injuring hundreds. Among the attackers, two had crossed the European borders as "refugees" sent by ISIS.

Mischaël Modrikamen is invited to speak in Washington, in Moscow, in Jerusalem but is denied any media presence in Belgium. Therefore, he is extensively using social networks, notably videos on Facebook, to reach directly Belgian audiences, with increasing success. After the terrorist attack in Paris, he filed a criminal complaint against the socialist mayor of Molenbeek. He accused the former Mayor, Philippe Moureaux, of complicity with extremism. He accused Moureaux of getting a large part of his votes with mosques’ support, and financing Wahhabi and Salafist cultural centers in Molenbeek with public money.

=== Endorsement of Donald Trump ===
On 11 March 2016, Modrikamen posted a video endorsing Donald Trump because "America should not become another Brussels" and inviting Trump to "make America great again". His video was republished by The Washington Post.

A month before the US election, Modrikamen released a second video supporting Donald Trump and criticizing Hillary Clinton as "very European, weak and globalist, obsessed by multiculturalism".

Modrikamen is the only Belgian political leader to have endorsed Trump, and this from the early beginning of his campaign among Republican contenders. The day before the American election, while the Belgian press unanimously predicted a large victory of Clinton, Modrikamen published an interview in the Belgian press declaring that "Trump would win the American election by K.O." on the next day. Modrikamen has declared in various interviews that after Brexit and the election of Trump, the populist movement would become global and that also in Europe time has arrived to give a voice back to ordinary people.

=== Involvement in The Movement ===
In January 2017, Modrikamen first registered The Movement group to rally European nationalists, which in 2018 was relaunched with former Trump strategist Steve Bannon as an anti-EU influence.

In 2018, Steve Bannon indicated he wanted to take command of The Movement, with Modrikamen as managing director. While Bannon said he would fund The Movement, Modrikamen indicated that he wanted funding to be "legitimate", with no involvement of Russian money or off-shore funds. Further issues developed during the year with disagreements between Bannon, Modrikamen and Raheem Kassam about their involvement with various populist and right-wing groups and figures such as Brothers of Italy, Filip DeWinter and Geert Wilders.

After launching The Movement, Modrikamen promised a January 2019, summit with 20 to 30 groups involved. It did not happen and as of March 2019, there were only three official members, two from Italy: the Brothers of Italy and the coalition party League, and Modrikamen's People's Party. This lack of enthusiasm was possibly due to the perceived outside influence of Bannon, or to disagreements over views between the various groups.

=== Jerusalem Summit and support to Israel ===
Modrikamen was one of the guest speakers at the International Leader summit in Jerusalem in December 2016. He brought his support to Israel and particularly the Israeli-occupied West Bank where he was welcomed with his delegation by the head of the Shomron Regional Council and then at the Knesset, the Israeli parliament. His party is the only one to have flatly rejected any Palestinian State recognition at the Belgium Parliament during a vote in 2016. He signed on behalf of its party the Jerusalem Declaration at the Summit which proclaims that "Leaders and engaged citizens from the sovereign states of Europe, India, Israel and the United States affirm and commit to advancing the following ideas and principles:

1. We renew the commitments and promises of past generations of integrity in advancing a free society based on the rule of law, protecting life, liberty and private property.

2. We are committed to the shared values and timeless principles that strengthen the rule of law, civil society and free enterprise, and, build strong national defenses that protect our citizens.

3. We are committed to secure and controlled borders, a strong defense to guarantee our security and liberties based on the rule of law, and the determination to address radical Islam whenever it threatens our free societies.

4. As guardians of our rule of law civilization, based on the Judeo-Christian values, we are committed to protecting our cultural heritages, the respective national traditions and the sovereignty of nations

5. We uphold the significance of free speech, media freedom, religious liberty and freedom to assemble".

=== Implication at the EU level ===
Modrikamen is one of the founders and vice-president of ADDE, an alliance of European parties, critical of the lack of democracy of European institutions and which aim at restoring sovereignty of European states. In 2016, the European parliament decided to deprive public funding from ADDE and require it to repay certain funds because ADDE had broken rules regarding financing national political parties and national election campaigns. ADDE and Modrikamen appealed this decision, because they believed it violated the most basic principles of the rule of law. However, in 2018, the European Court of Justice rejected the appeal, and additionally required the Institute for Direct Democracy in Europe (IDDE) to pay Parliament's legal costs. The Parliament move against ADDE and IDDE was engineered by Ulrike Lunacek, an Austrian MEP, member of the Bureau of the European Parliament, although she denied this was a blanket attack on right wing, euro-sceptic parties.

=== Brandishing the broom ===
At the November 2016, Congress of its People's Party, Modrikamen did not hesitate to brandish a broom to clean up the mess of Belgian politics, in an image evoking Governor Schwarzenegger's bid in the California elections of 2003. He aims to cut subsidies to inefficient government organizations or non-profit organizations. In the last Manifesto that he wrote for his party, Modrikamen calls for protectionist measures in order to restore an efficient industry in Belgium and Western Europe against unfair China imports. Wallonia was, at the end of the nineteenth century, one of the major economic centers in the world due to its coal, river network, and railways, as well as an efficient labor force and entrepreneurship. However, its over-reliance on mining and heavy industry and lack of diversification became apparent once other European nations rebuilt after World War One, and particularly in the 1950s, as coal declined. Modrikamen wants to restore Belgium's standing, although this would most likely require fundamental shifts in industrial policy at regional and national level, as well as a huge change in the industrial mix in Wallonia.

== Personal life ==
Mischaël Modrikamen has been married to Yasmine Dehaene (born 24 September 1964) since 1997. Yasmine Dehaene is a former member of the Brussels bar and has become General secretary of the People's Party and Executive Director of the ADDE. They have three children: Nathan (born in 1994), Raphaël (born in 1997), and Sasha (born in 2008).

During his free time, he often paints pictures, many of which are abstract.

== Bibliography ==
Several books have been published on Mischaël Modrikamen's actions: "Fortis jusqu'au bout", in Dutch "Fortis tot de laatste snik" written by Modrikamen and Charles Bricman on the Fortis case. One would also mention "Fortis, Dexia, le séisme", "La chute de la maison Fortis" and "Banqueroute", all written by journalists which describe Mischaël Modrikamen's action. A first biography of Mischaël Modrikamen was published in 2009 under the title "Modrikamen Recht door zee" ("Modrikamen straight ahead").

- Fortis, Tot de laatste snik, 2009, uitg. Borgerhoff & Lamberigts, 144 p. - ISBN 978-90-8931-074-3
