= List of Odonata species of Telangana =

List of Odonata recorded in Telangana, India

This article lists the Odonata species found in the Indian state of Telangana. While there have been no surveys on the Odonata of Telangana, many species have been recorded from citizen science platforms like iNaturalist.

== Suborder: Zygoptera (Damselflies) ==
There are 20 species of damselflies found in the state.

=== Family: Lestidae (Spread-winged damselflies) ===
==== Genus: Lestes ====
===== Species: Lestes concinnus - dusky spreadwing =====
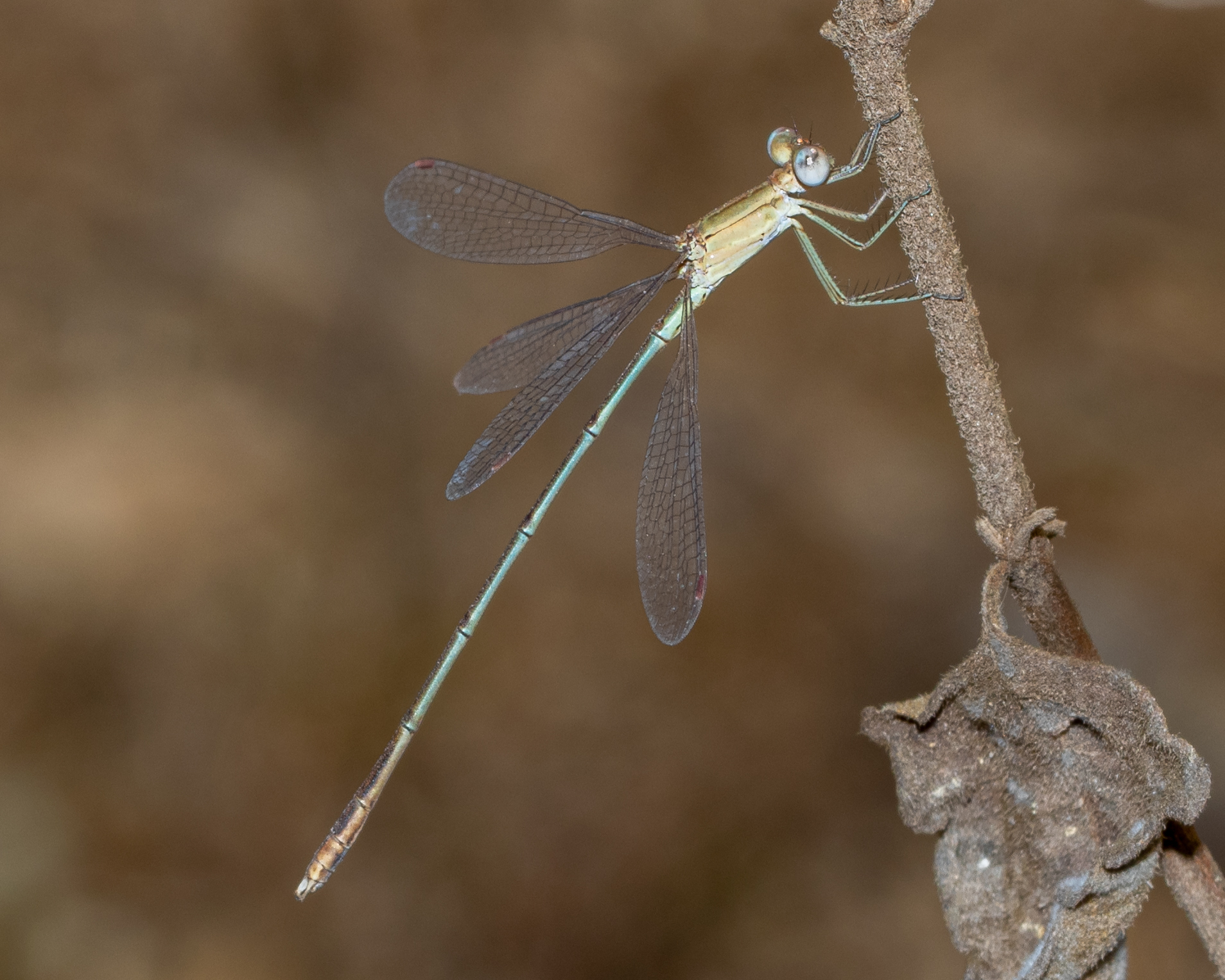
Male

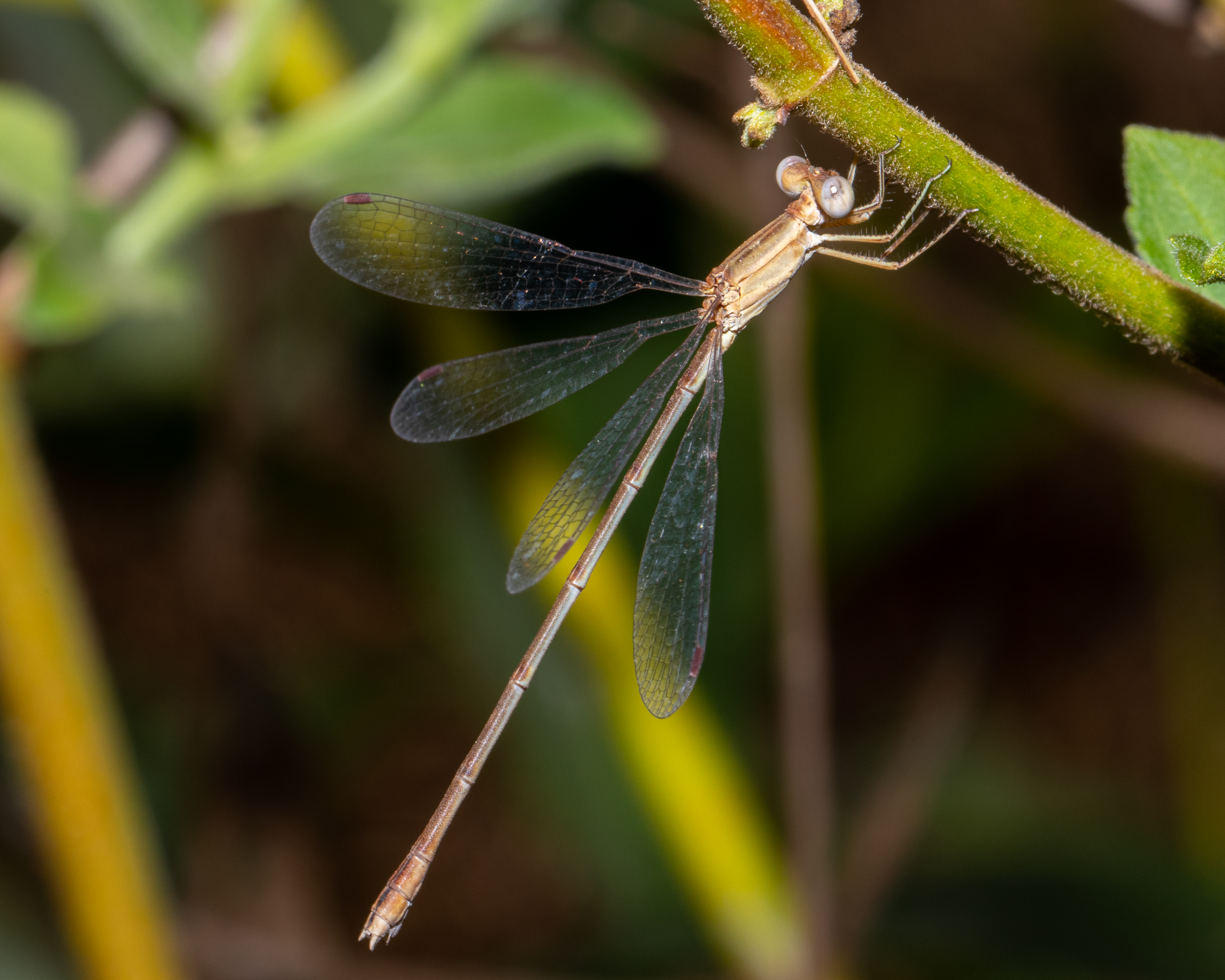
Female

===== Species: Lestes elatus - Asian emerald spreadwing =====
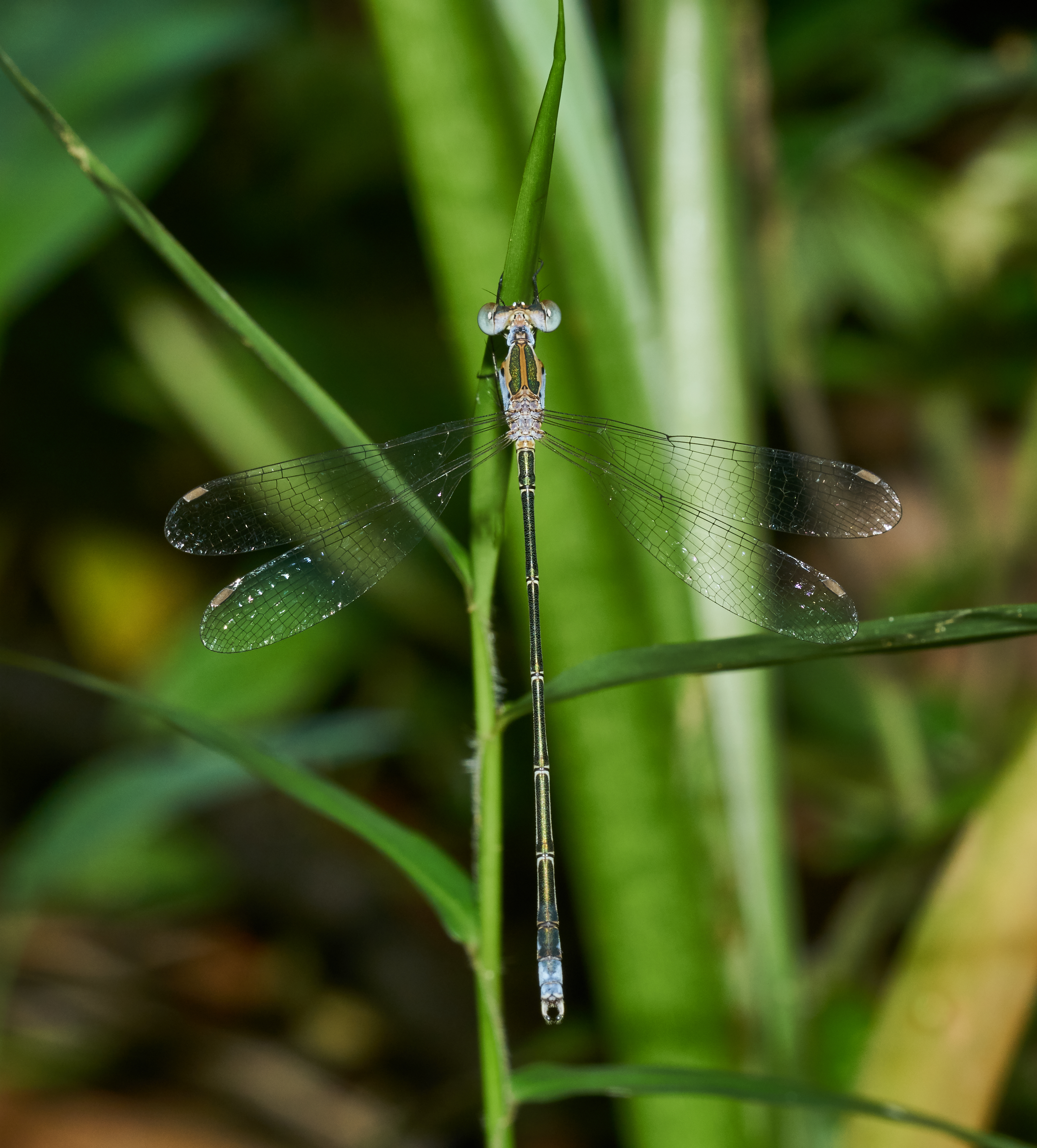
Male

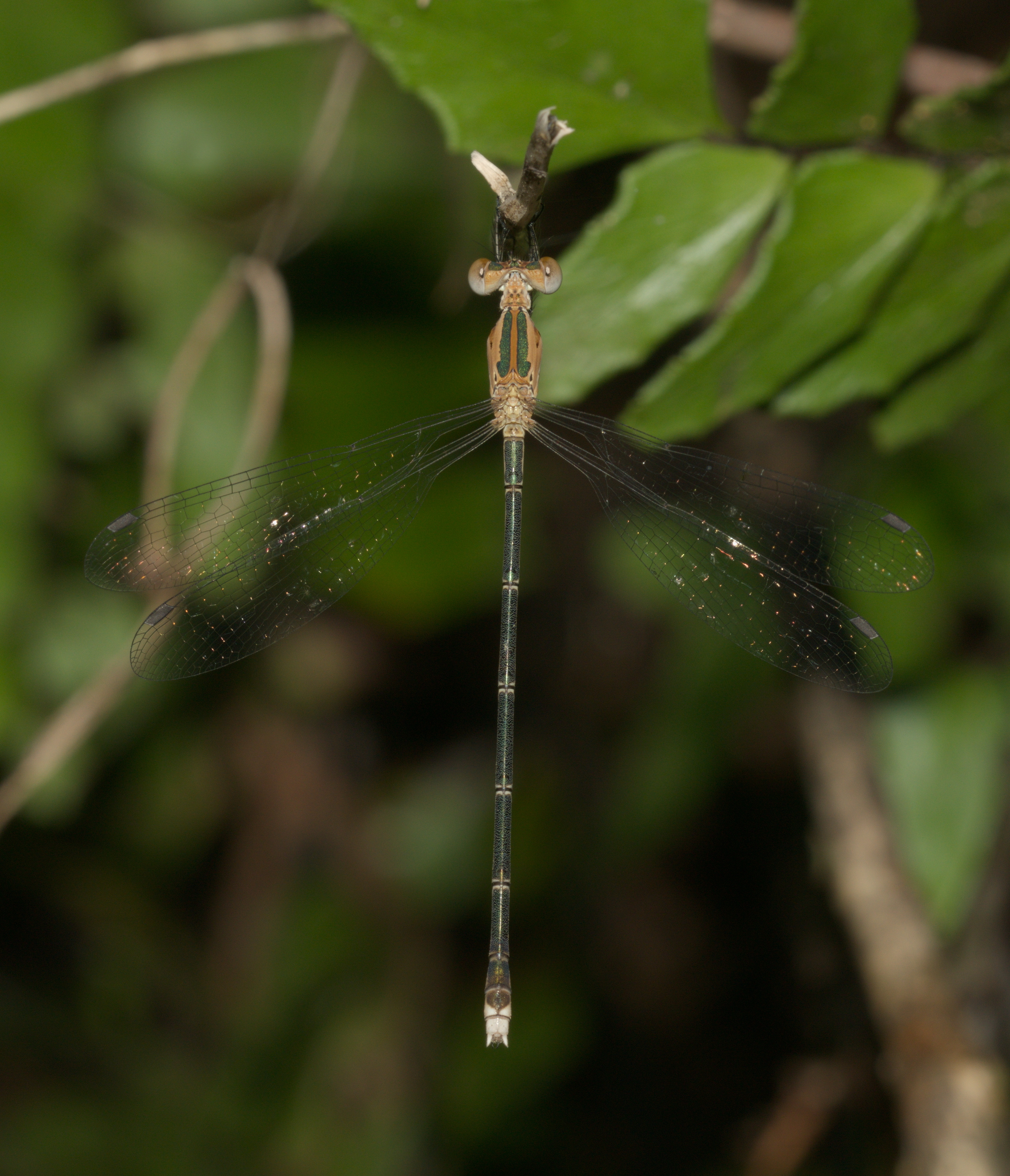
Female

=== Family: Calopterygidae (Broad-winged damselflies) ===
==== Species: Vestalis apicalis ====
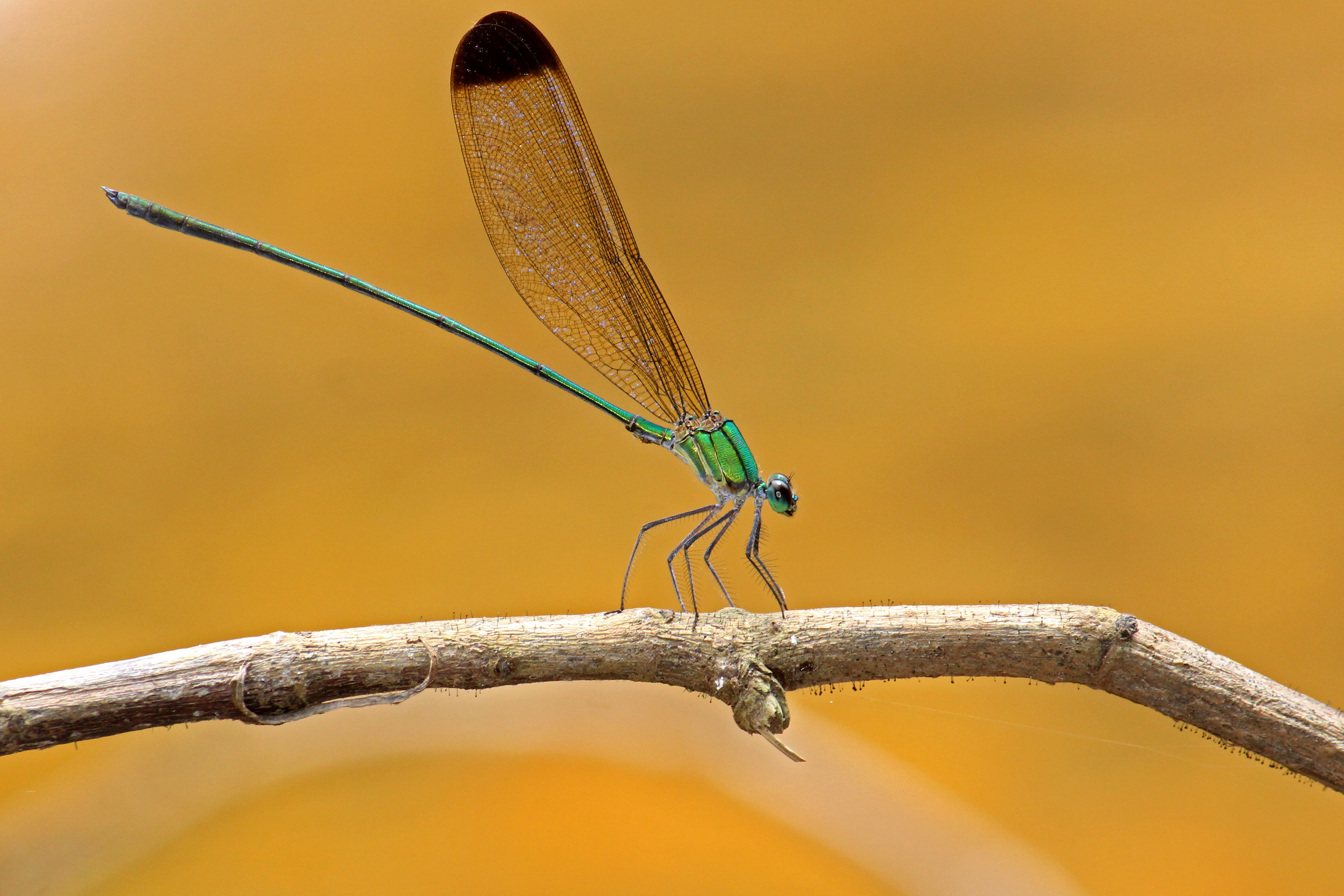
Male

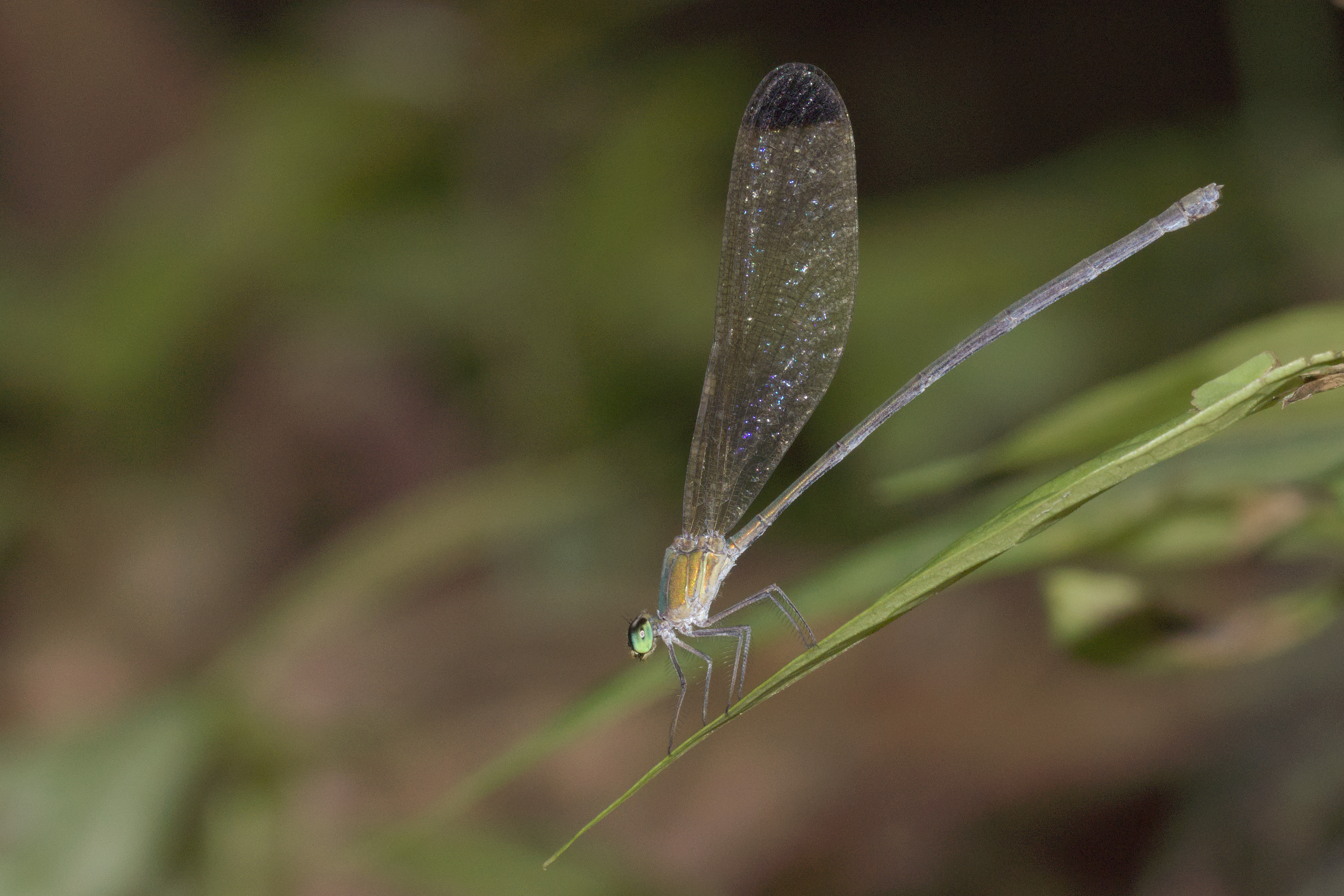
Female

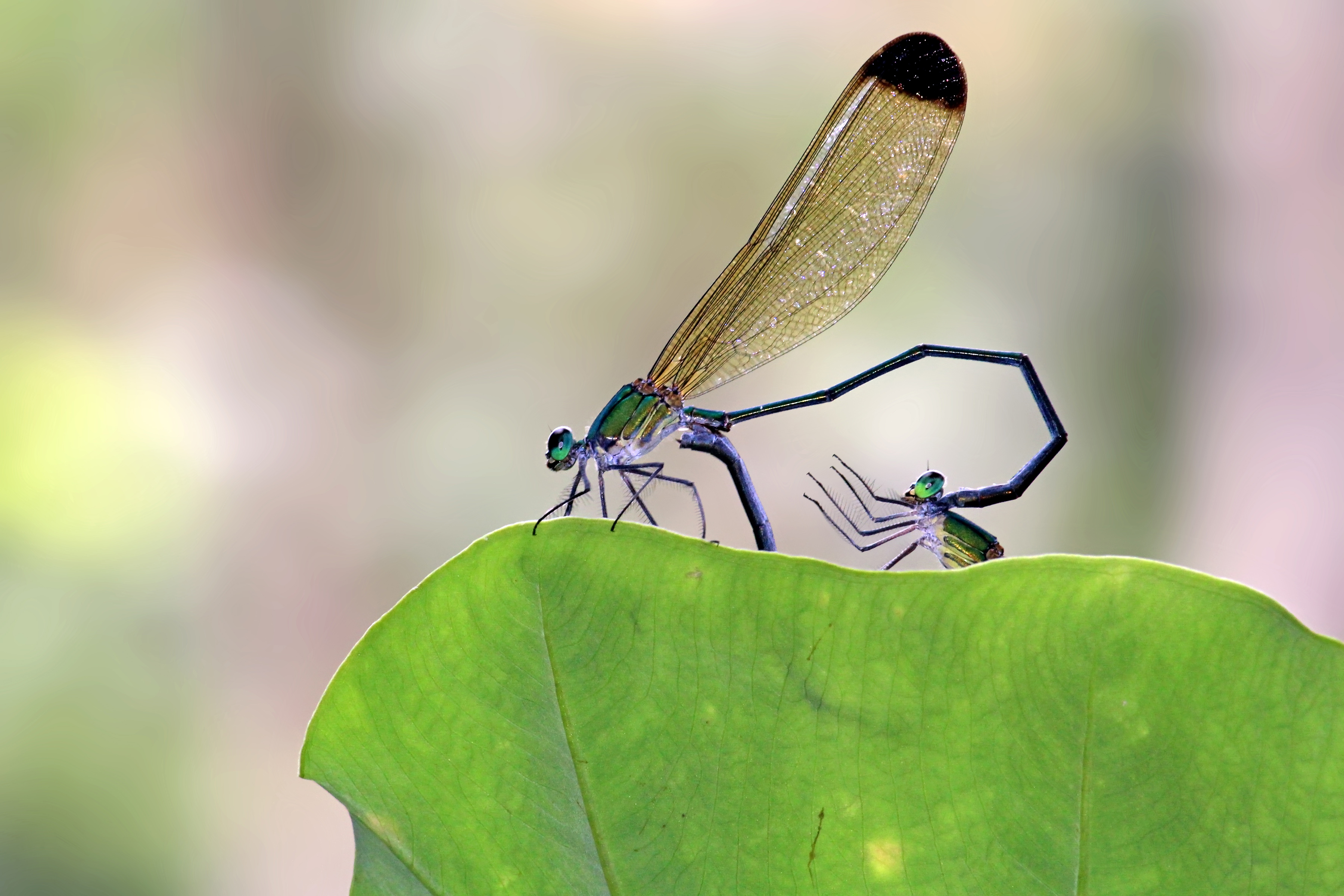
Mating

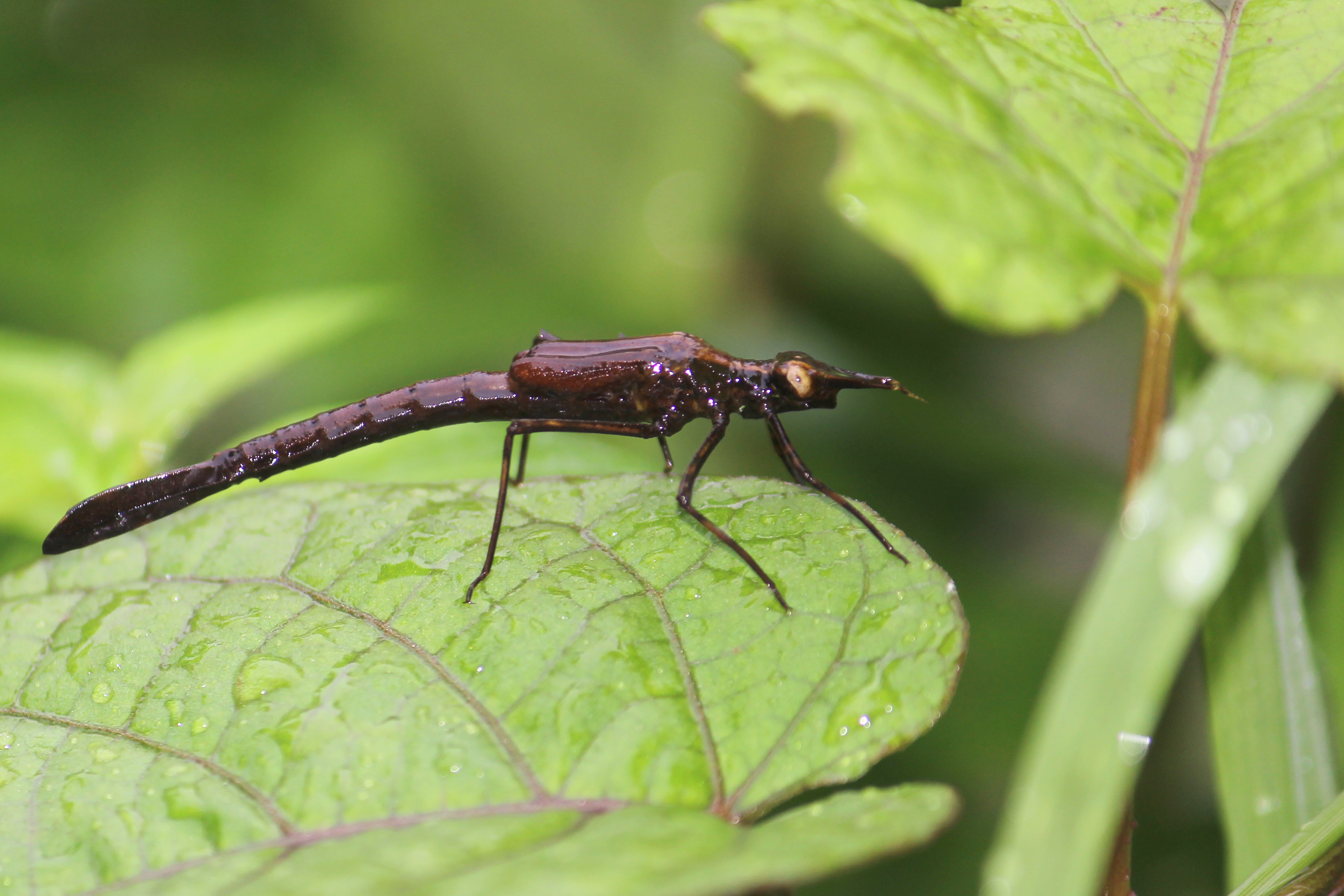
Larva

==== Species: Vestalis gracilis ====
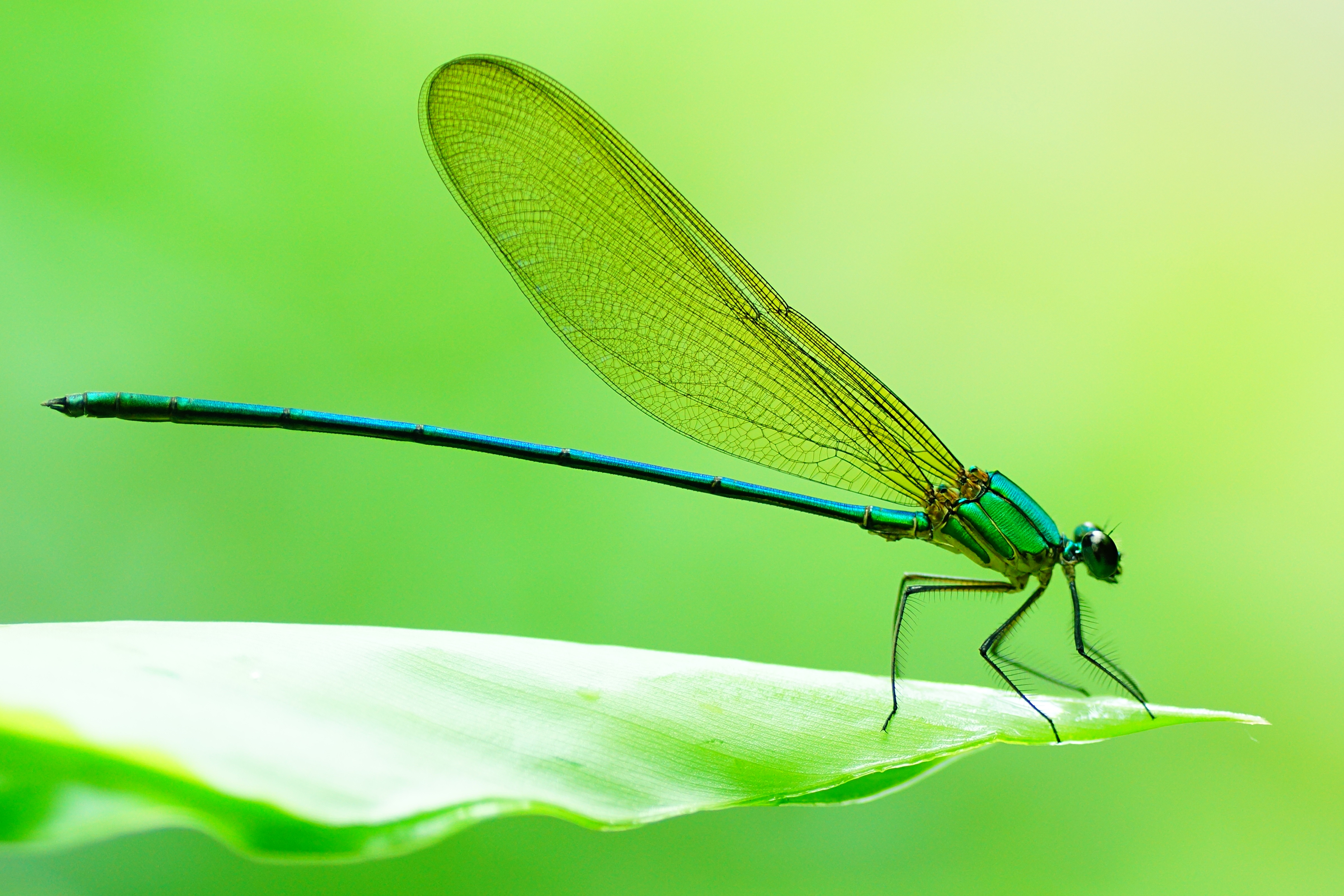
Male

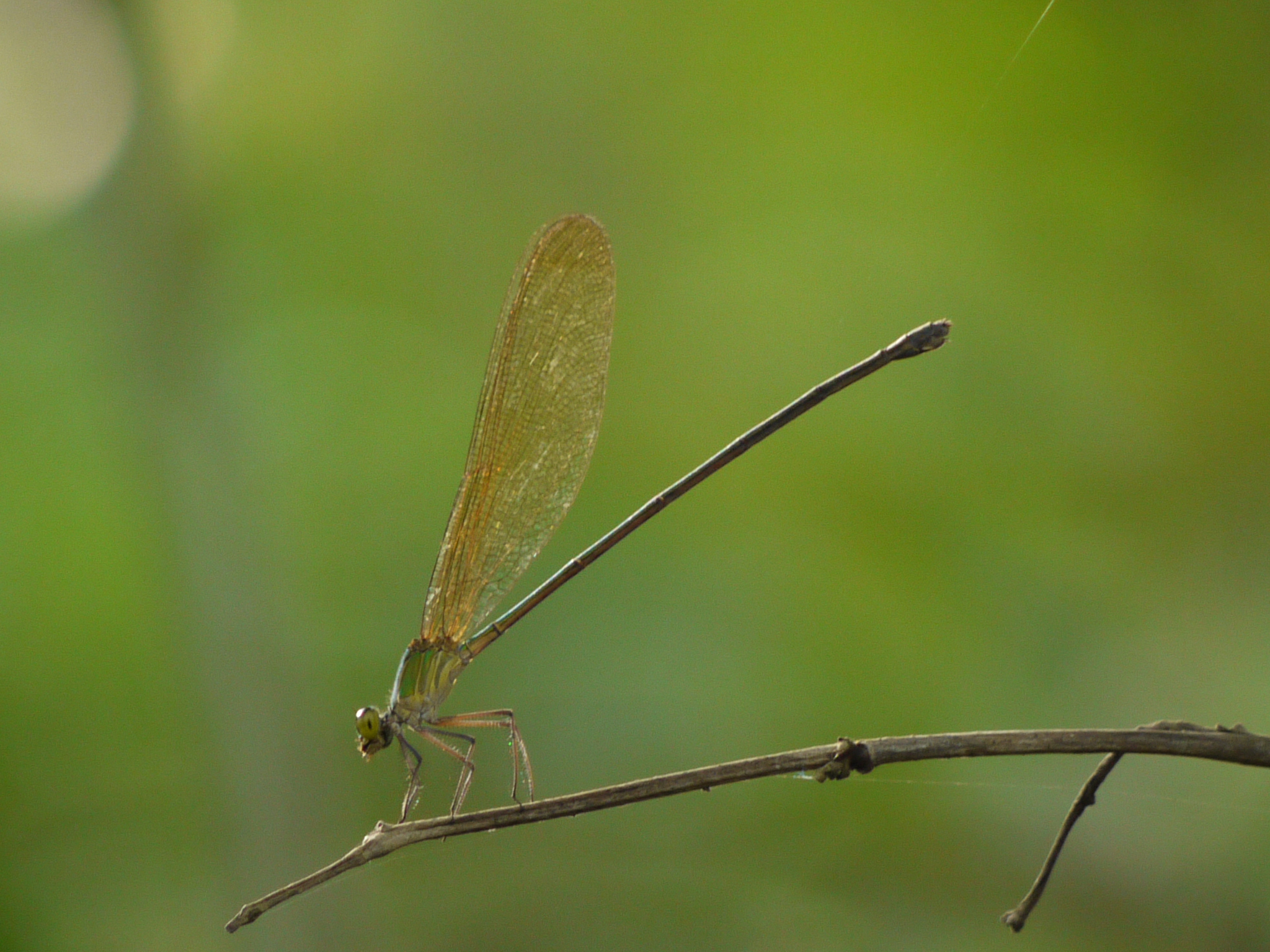
Female

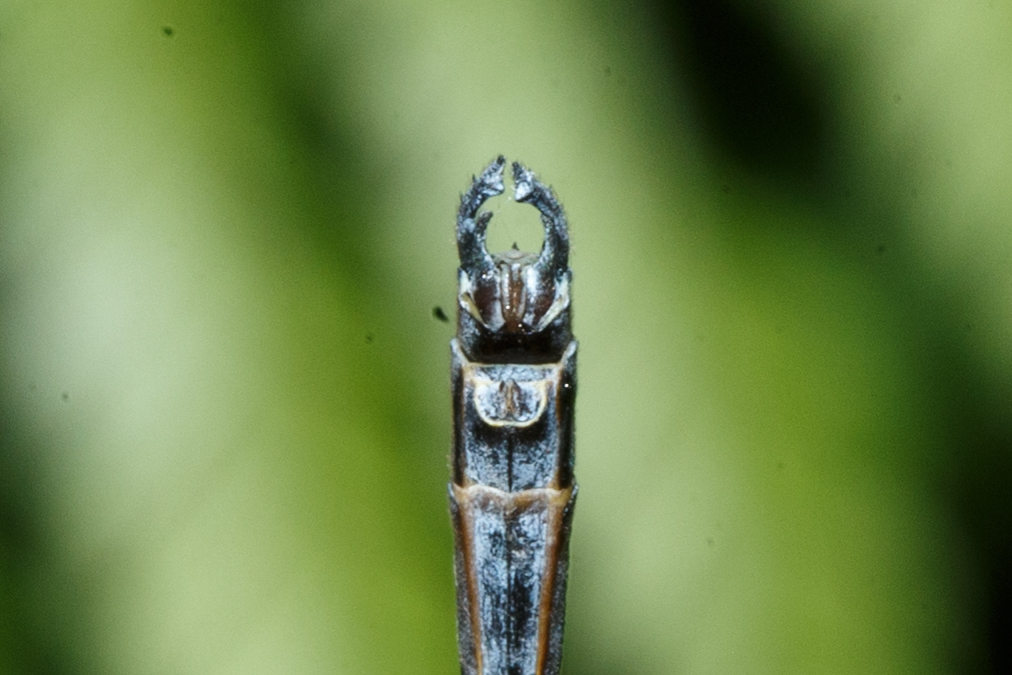
Anal appendage

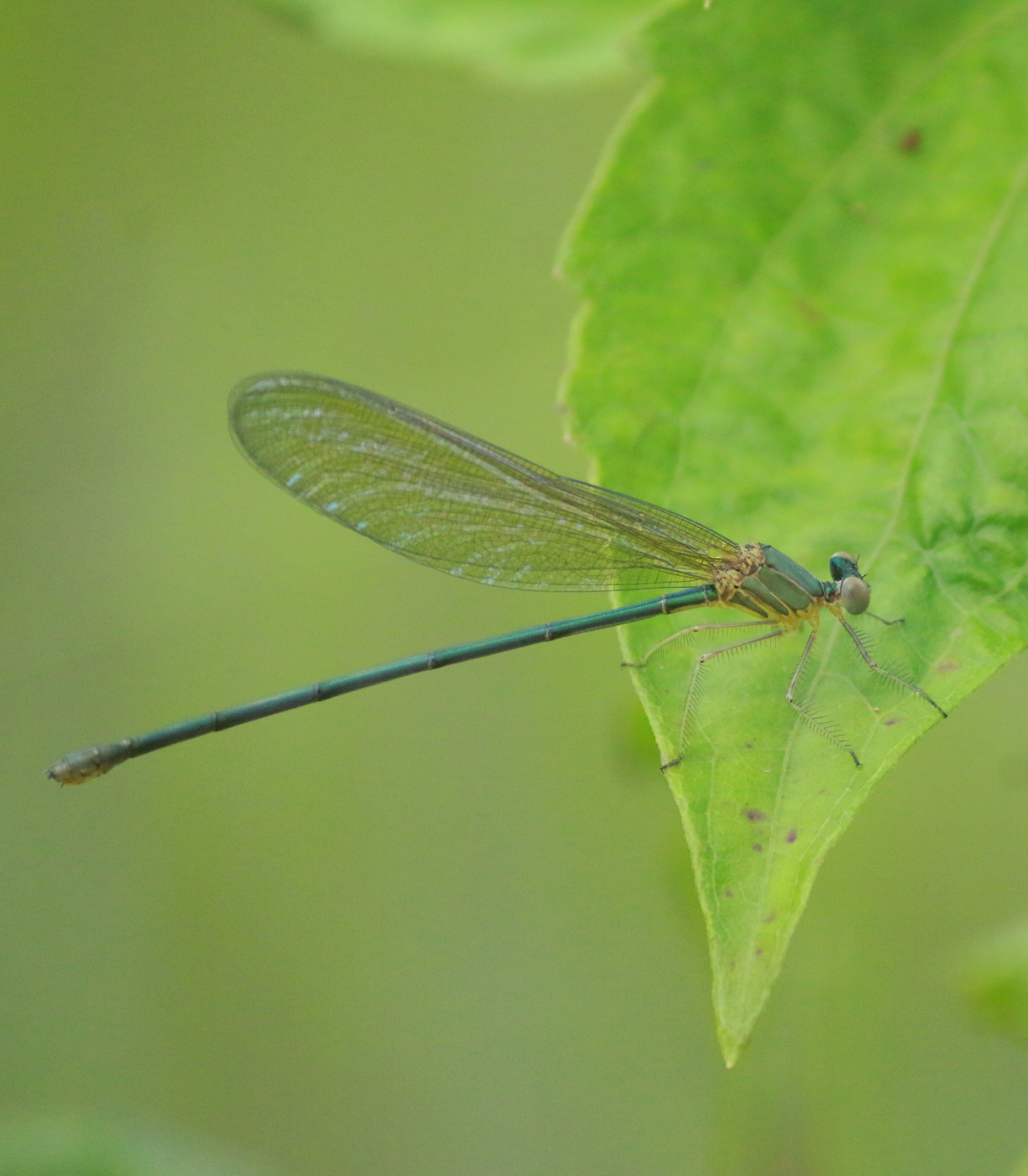
Young male

=== Family: Chlorocyphidae ===
==== Species: Heliocypha bisignata - stream ruby ====
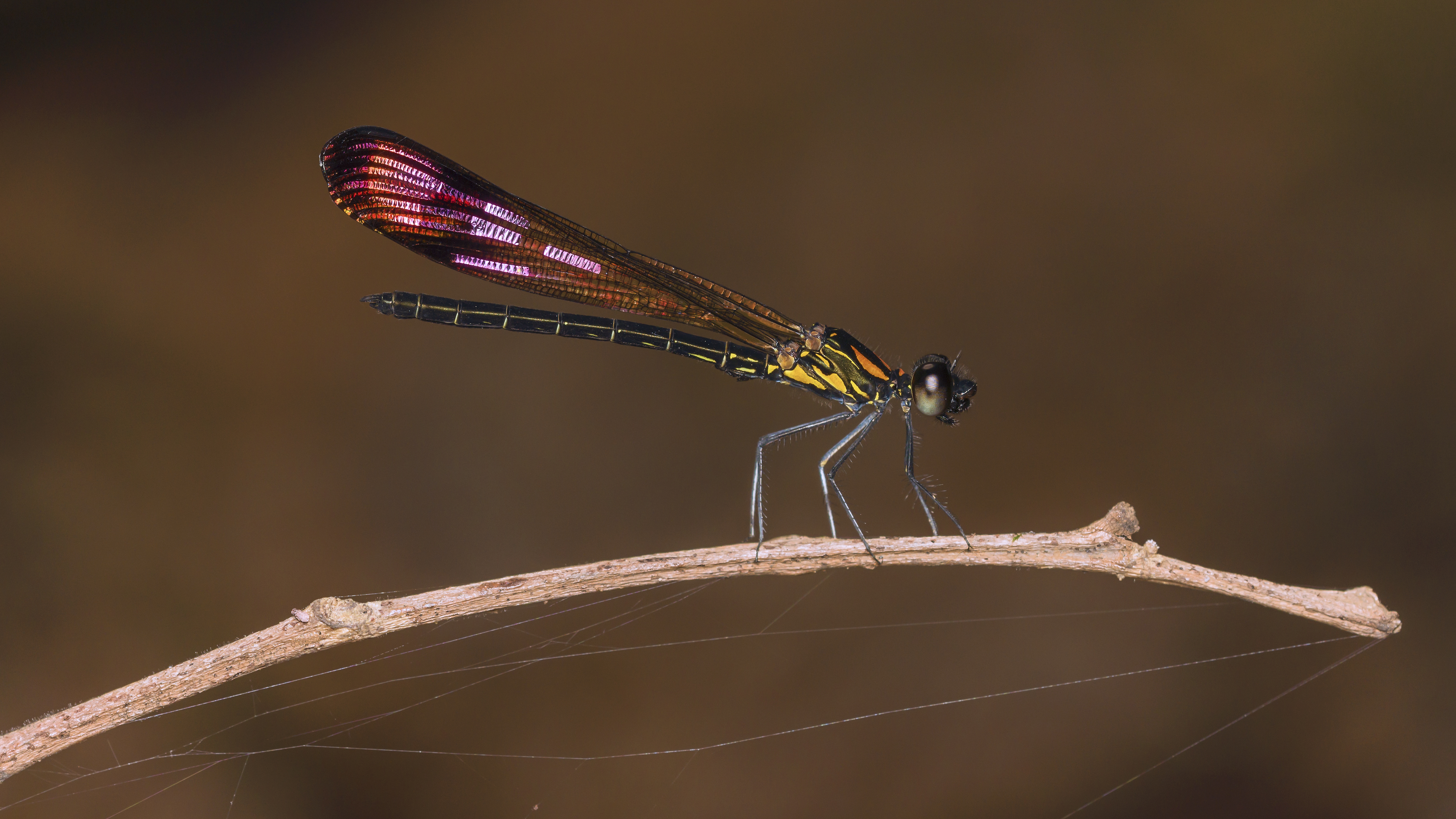
Male

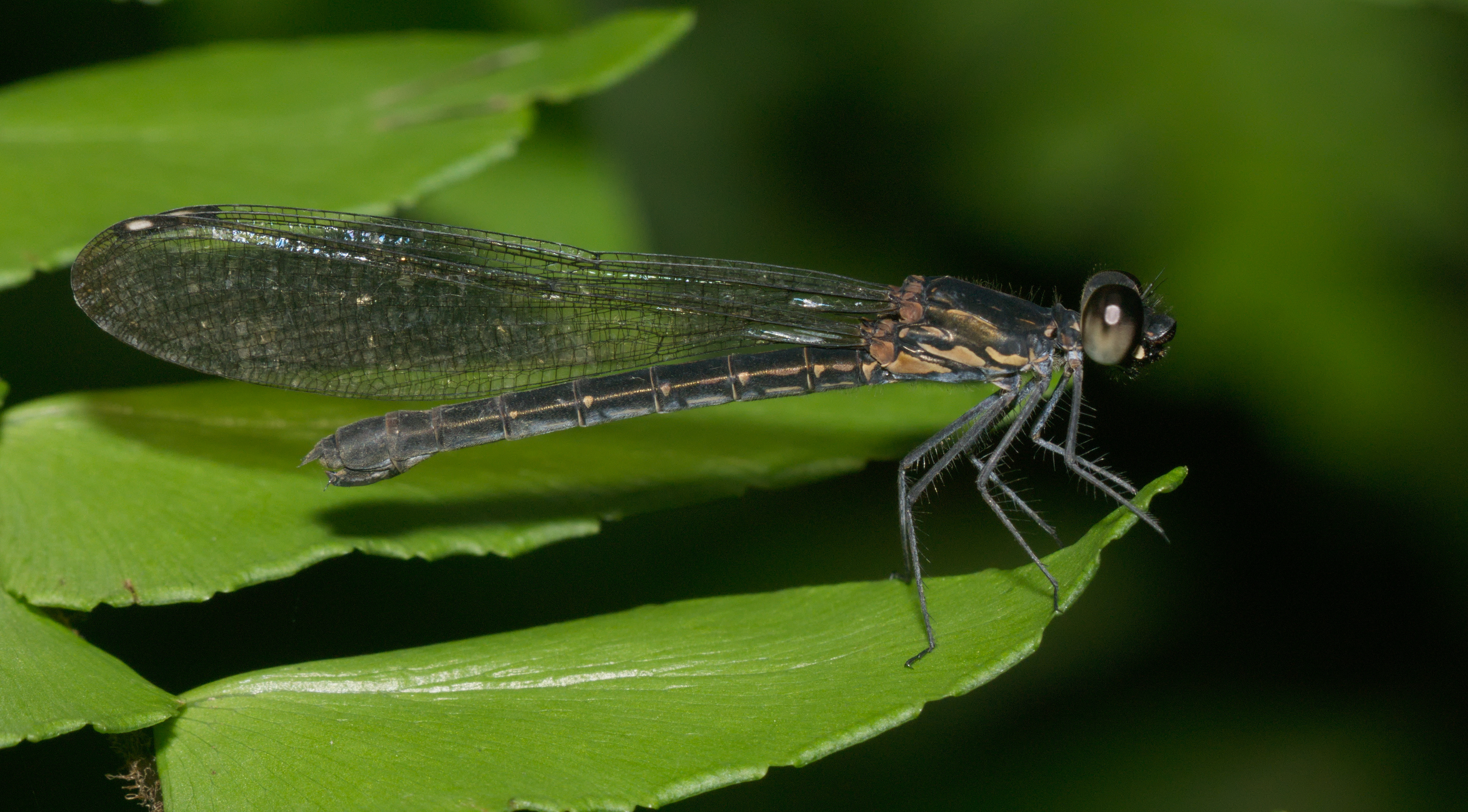
Female

==== Species: Libellago indica - southern heliodor ====
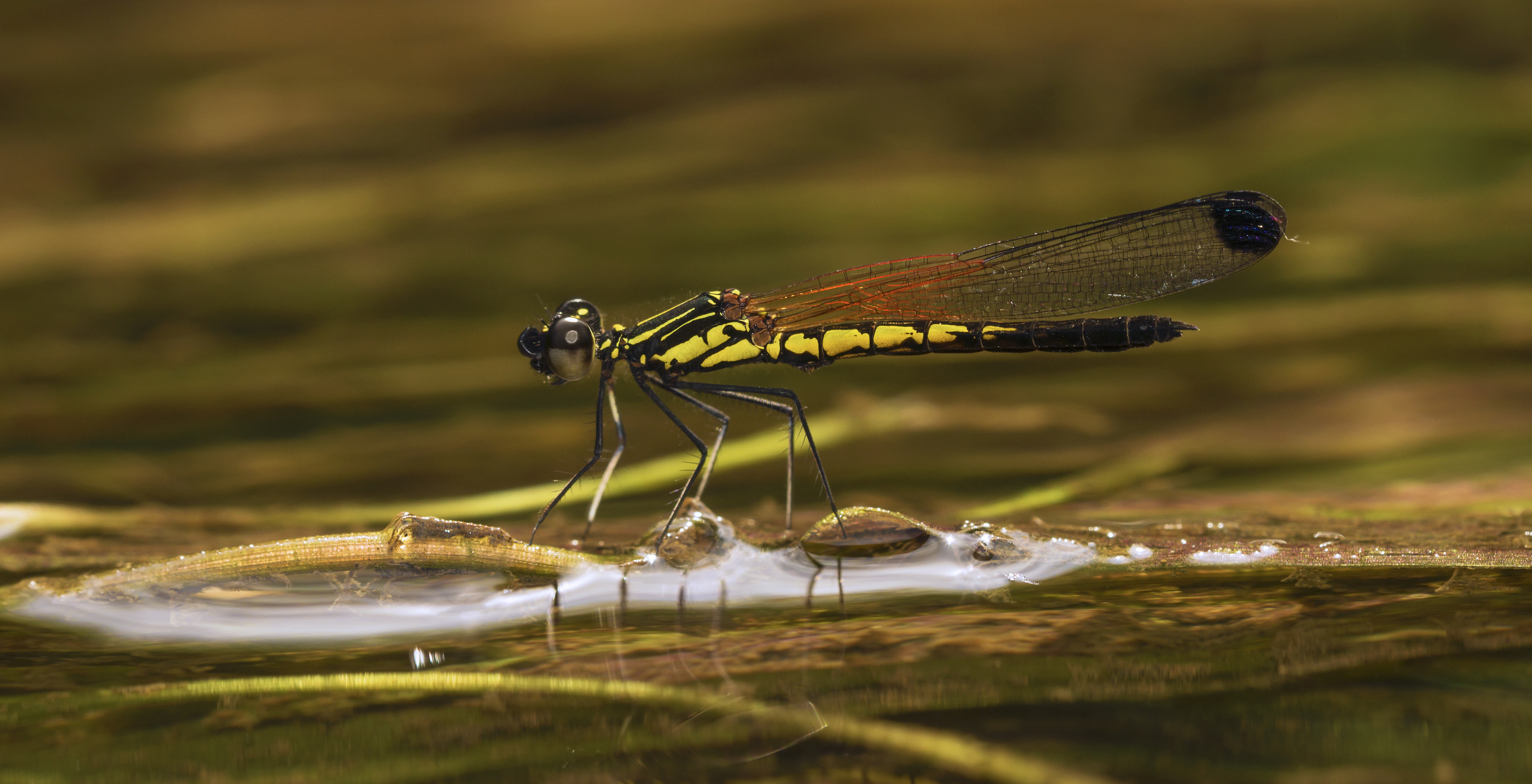
Male

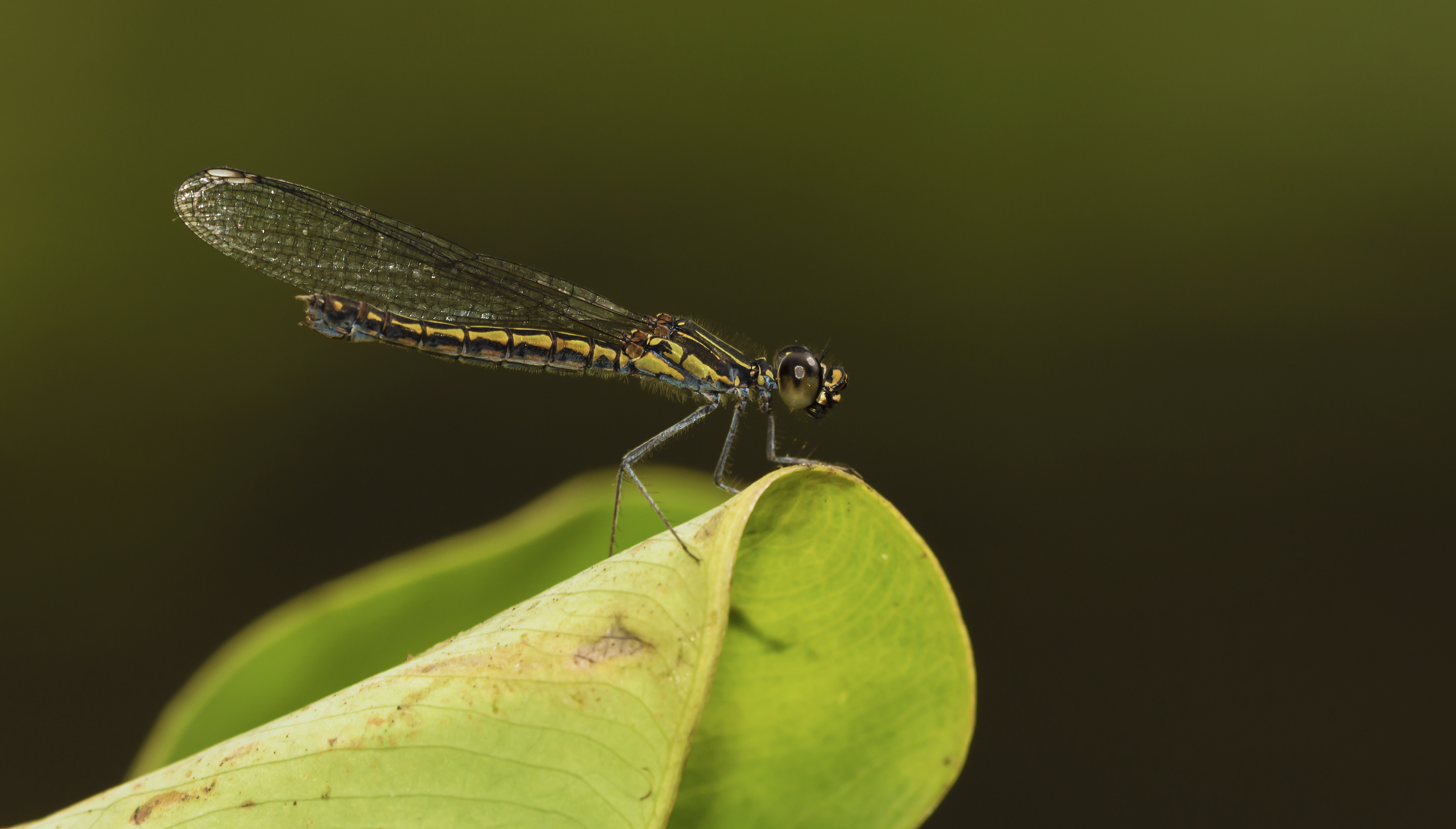
Female

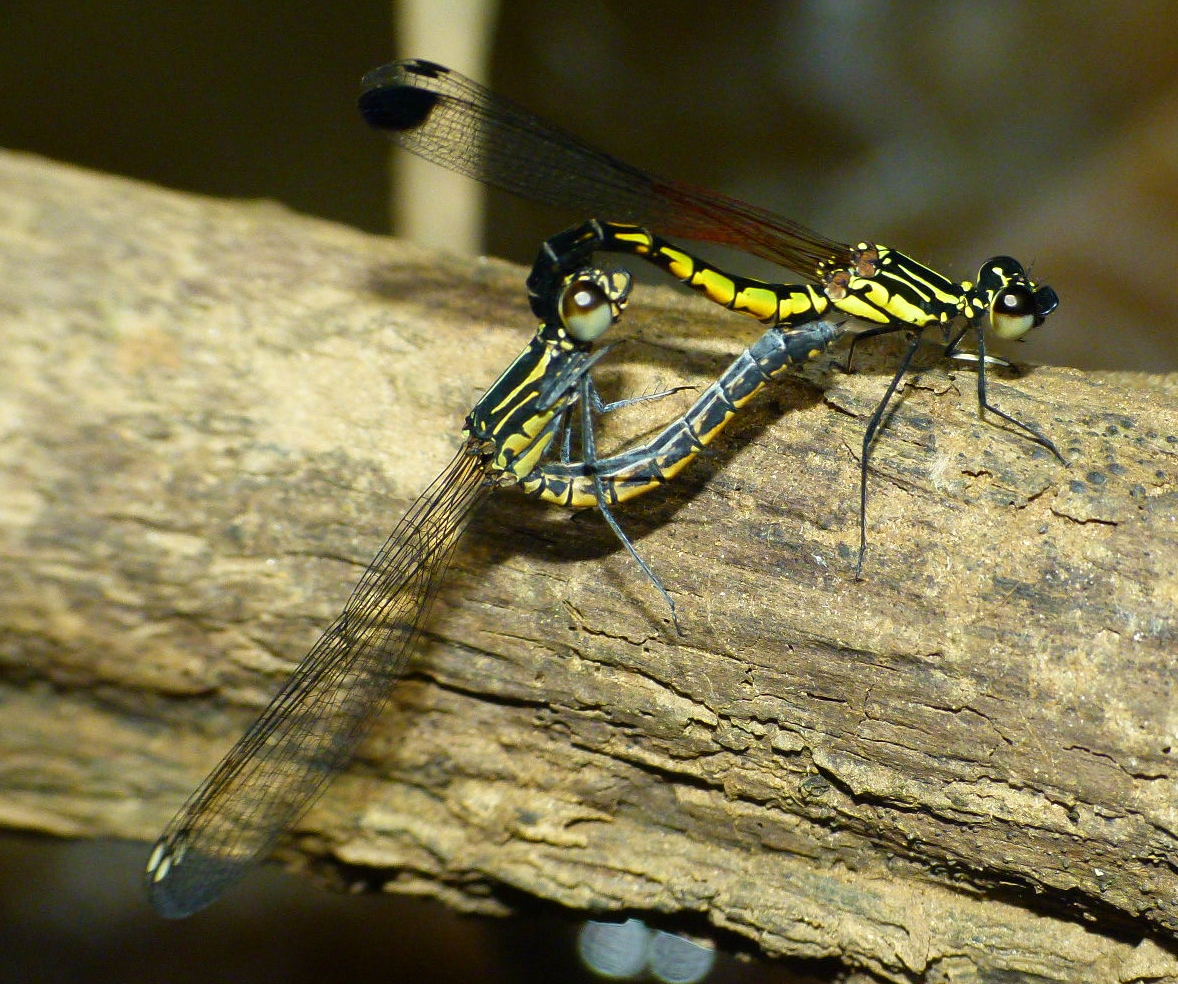
Mating

=== Family: Platycnemididae ===
==== Species: Caconeura ramburi - Coorg bambootail ====
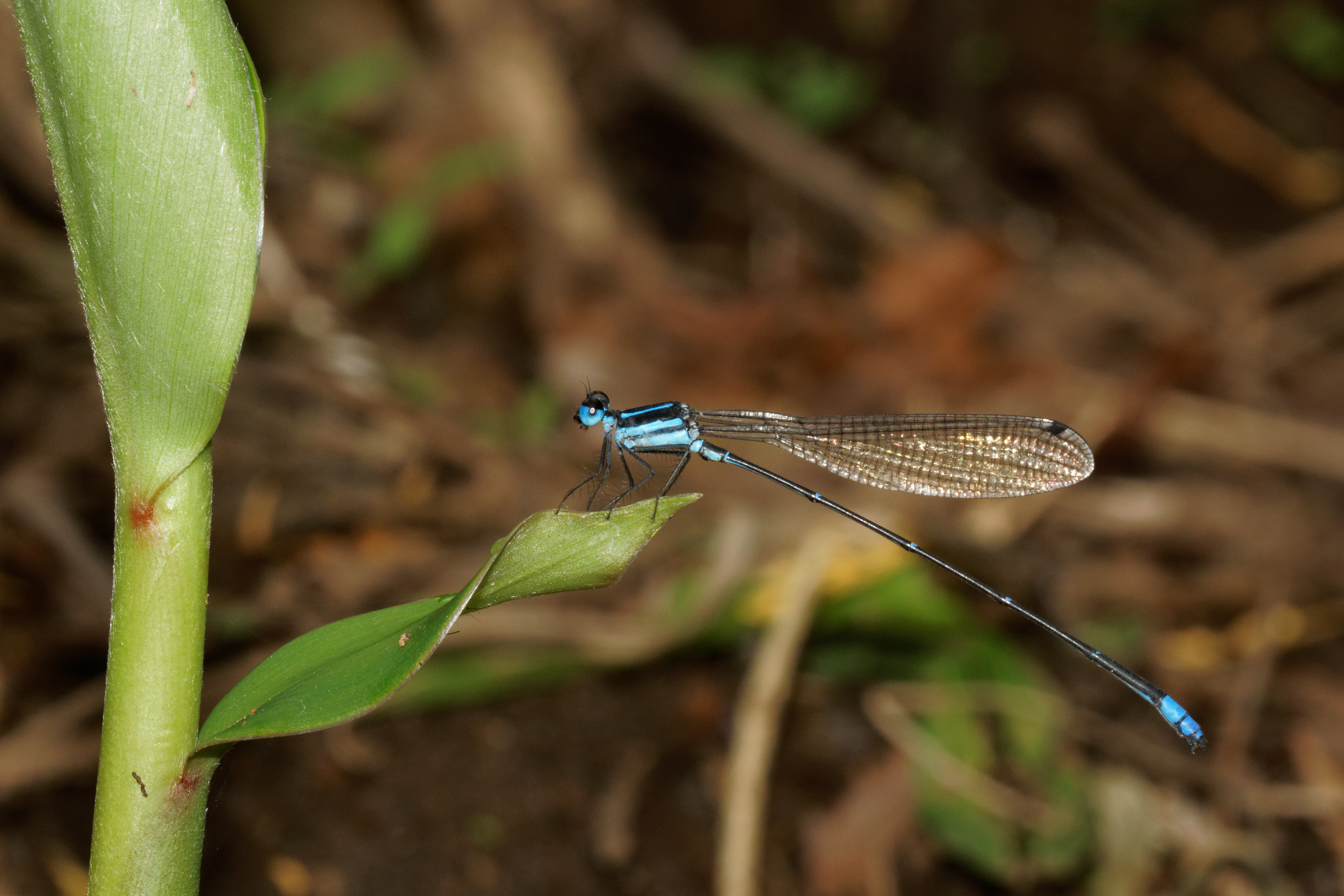
Male

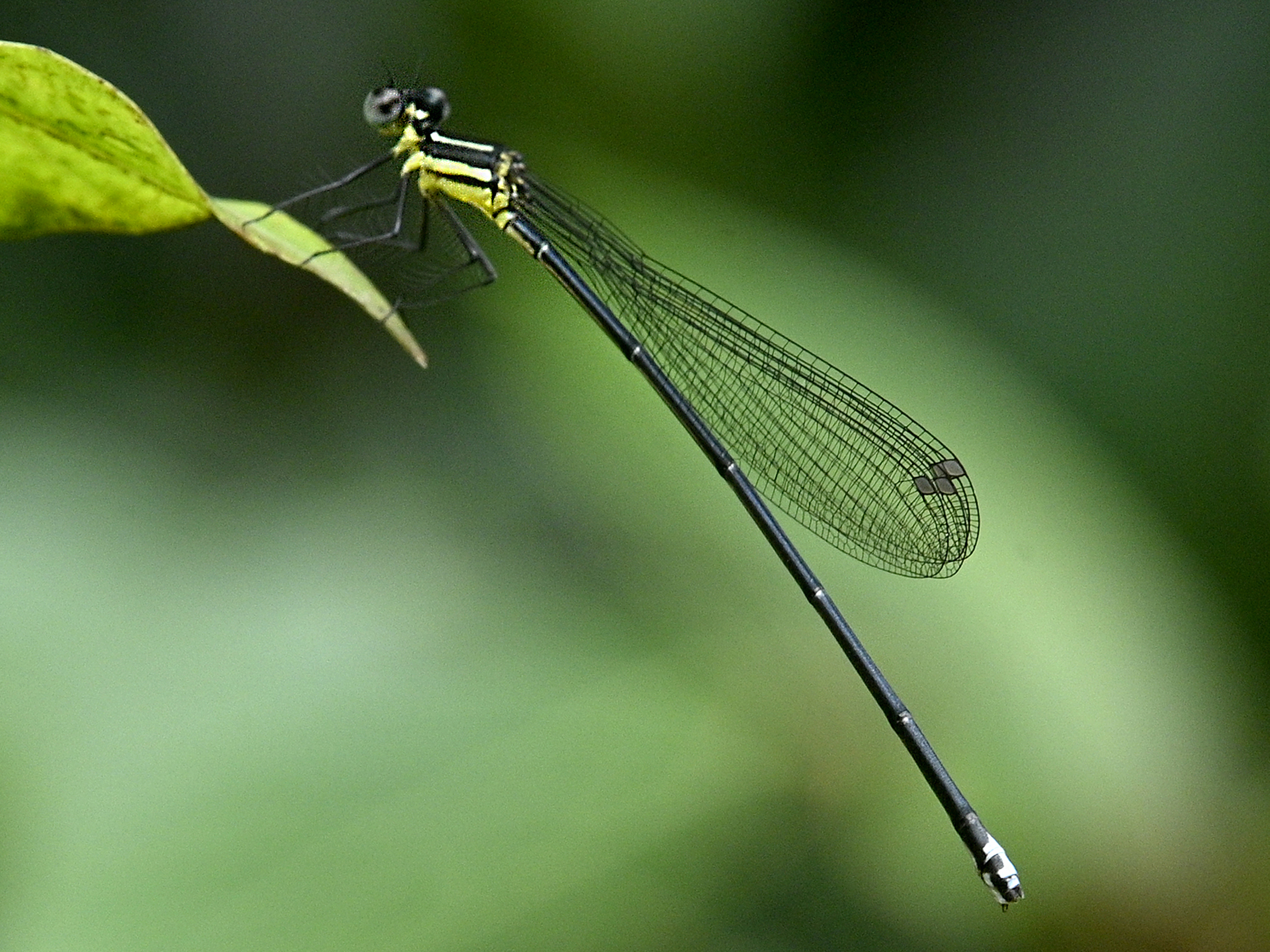
Female

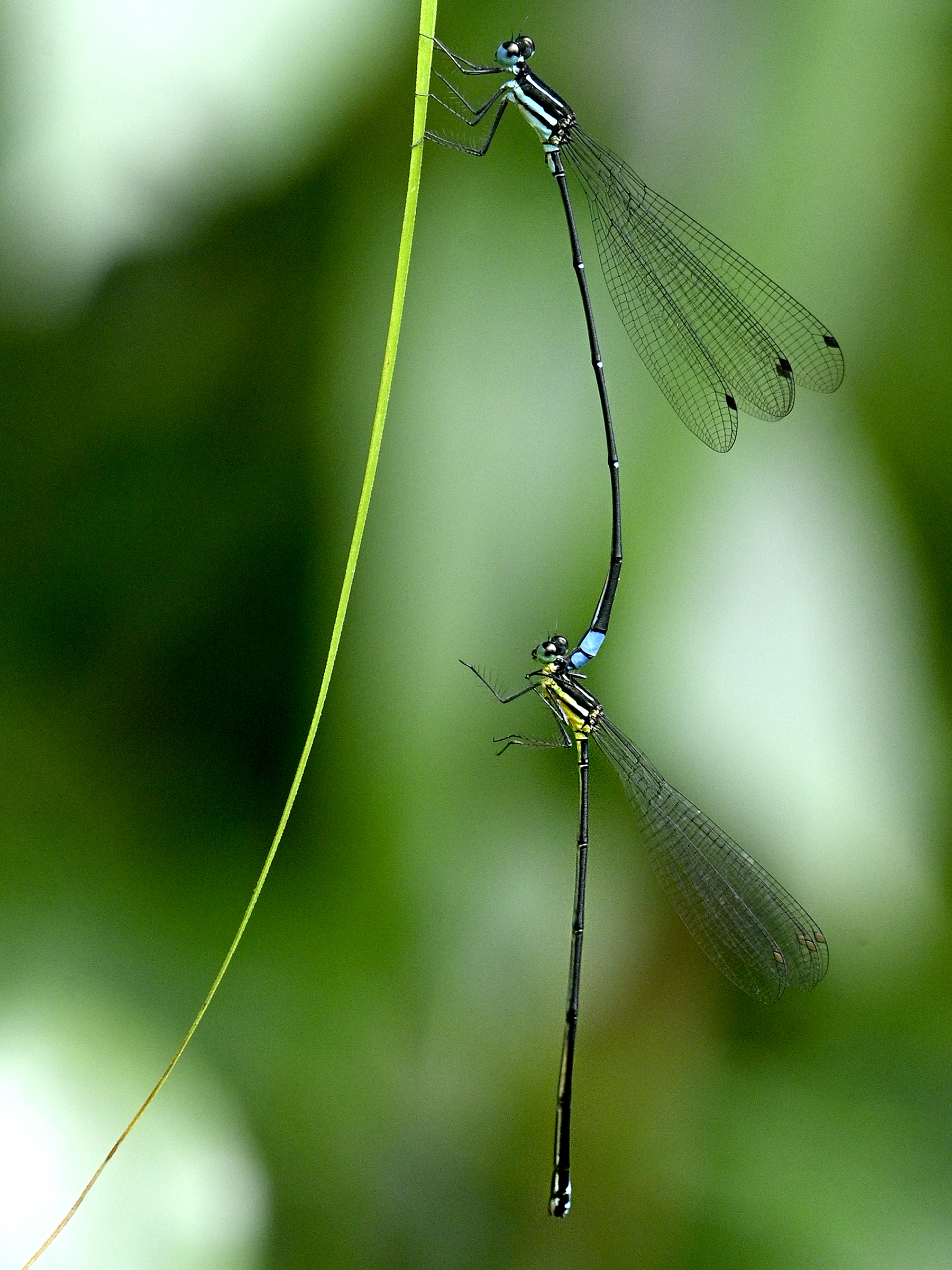
Mating

==== Species: Copera marginipes - yellow featherlegs ====
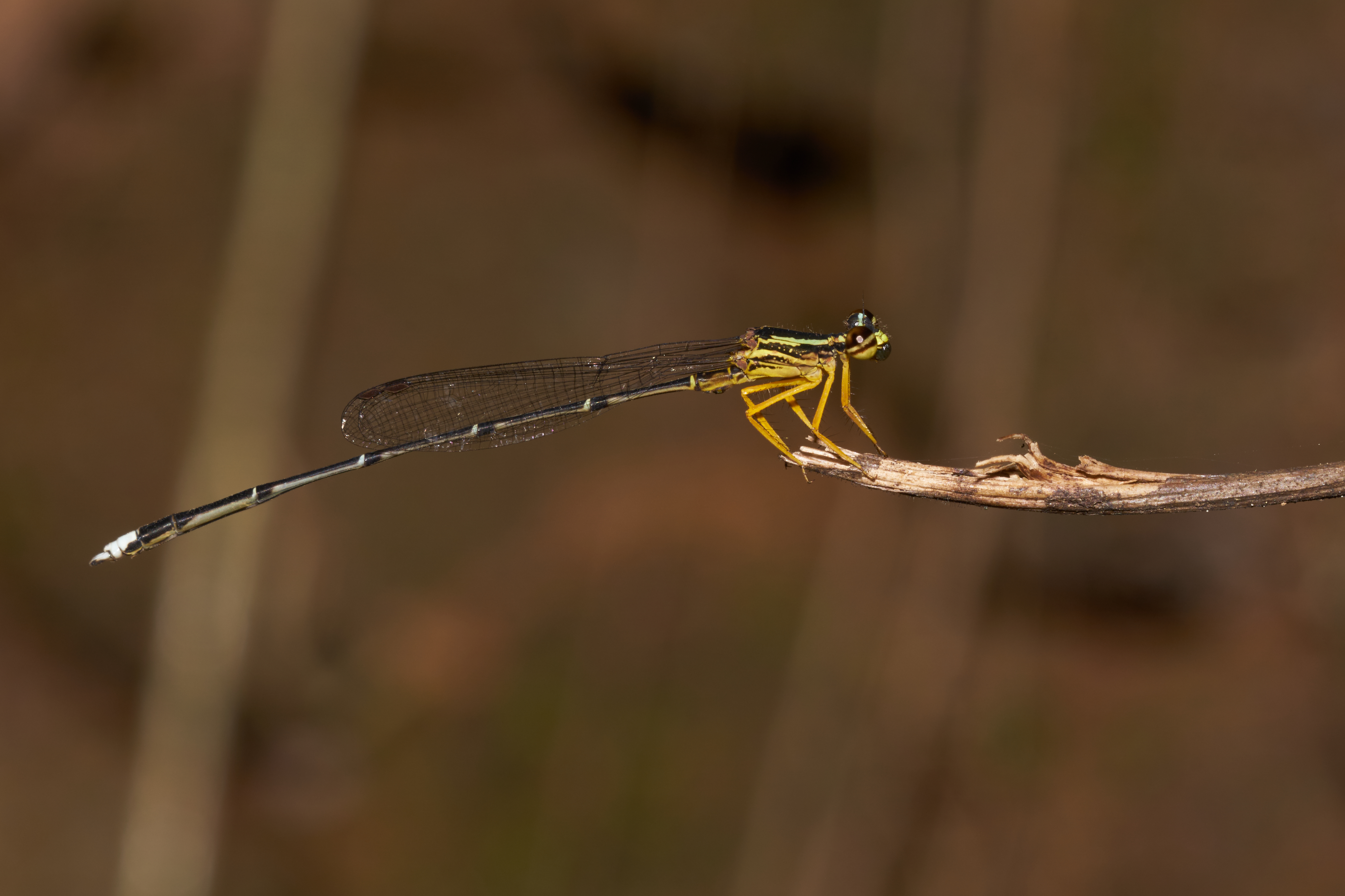
Male

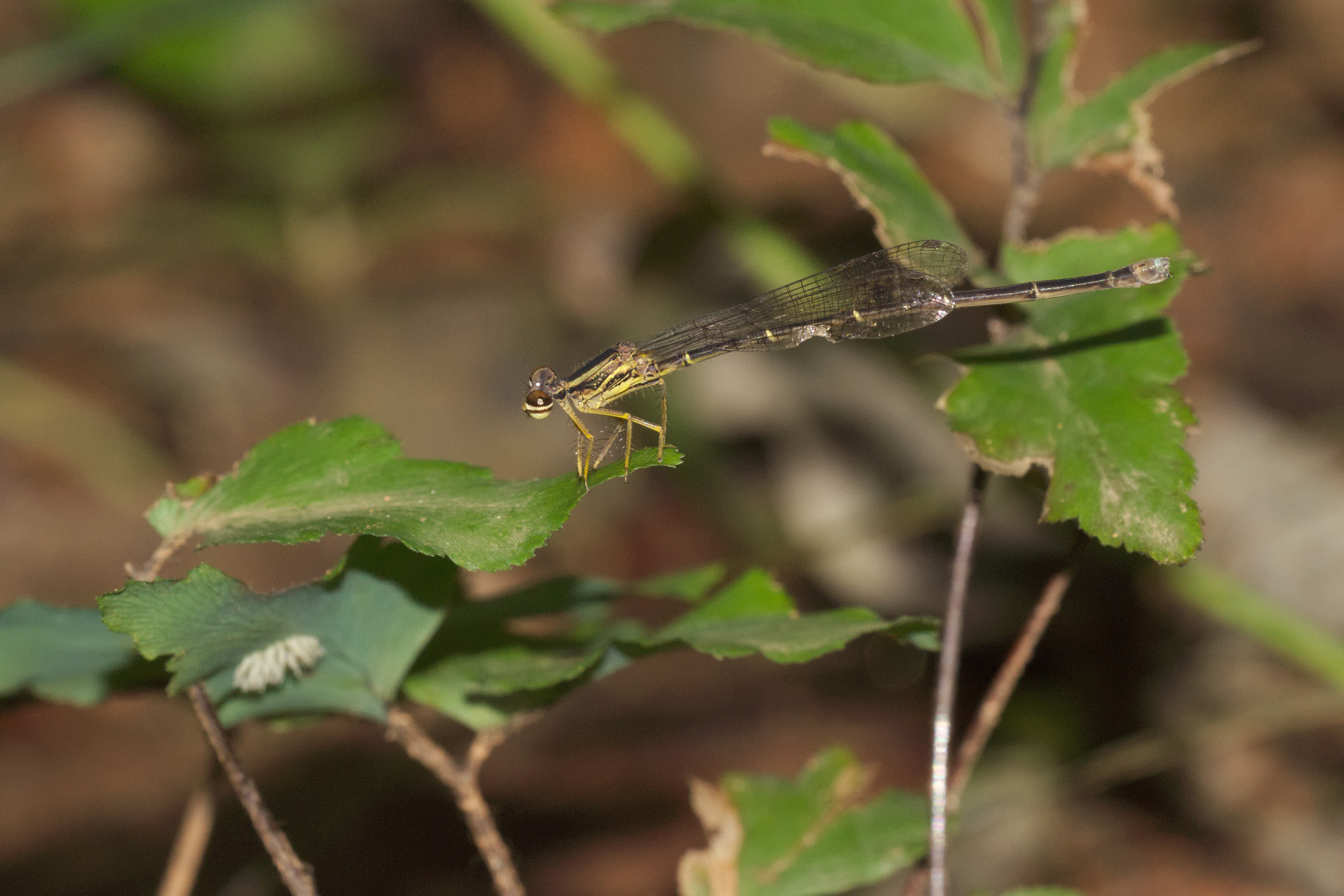
Female

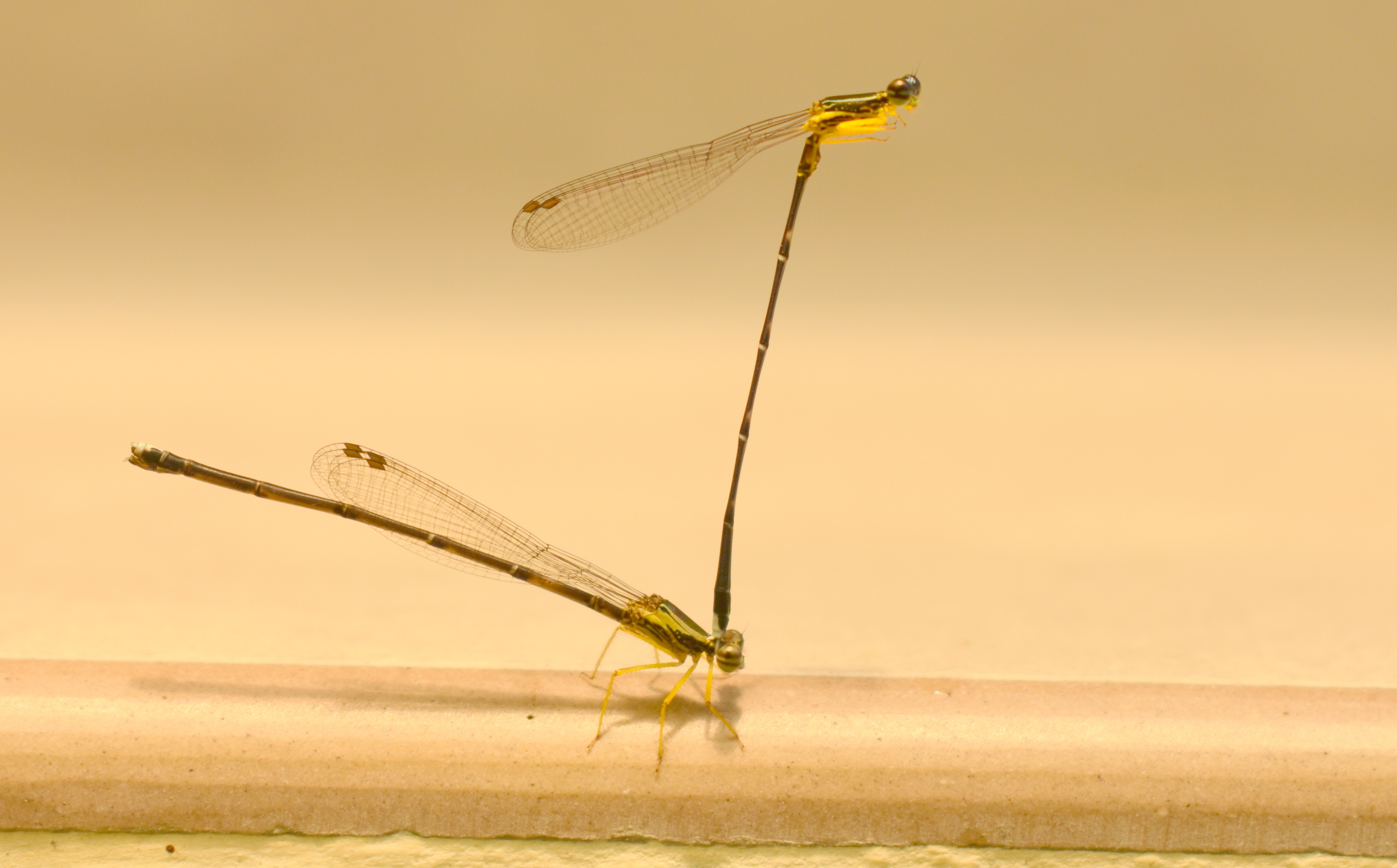
Mating

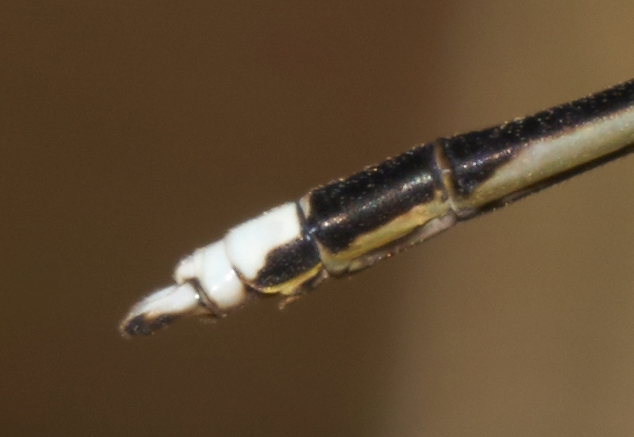
Anal appendages

==== Species: Copera vittata - blue bush dart ====
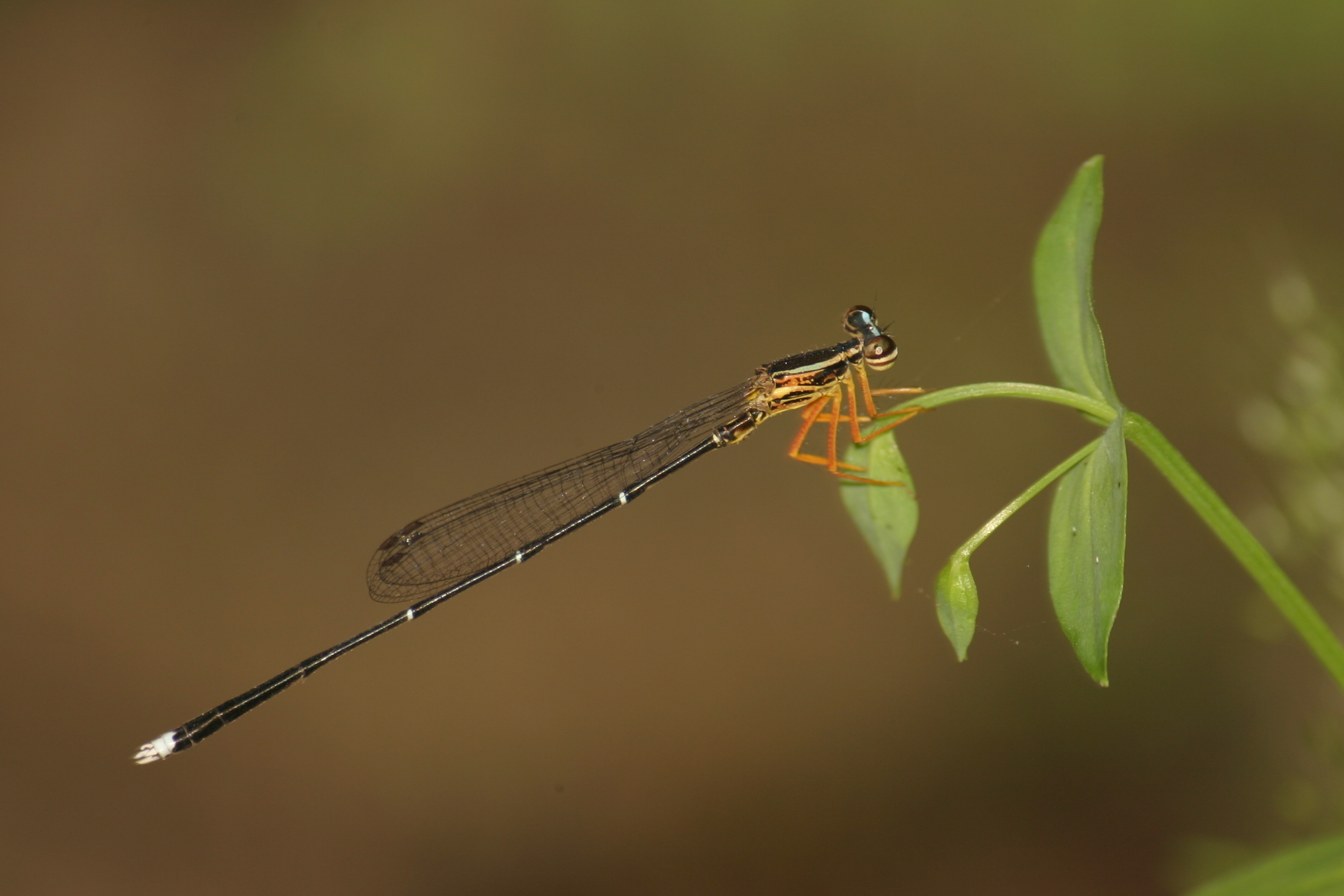
Male

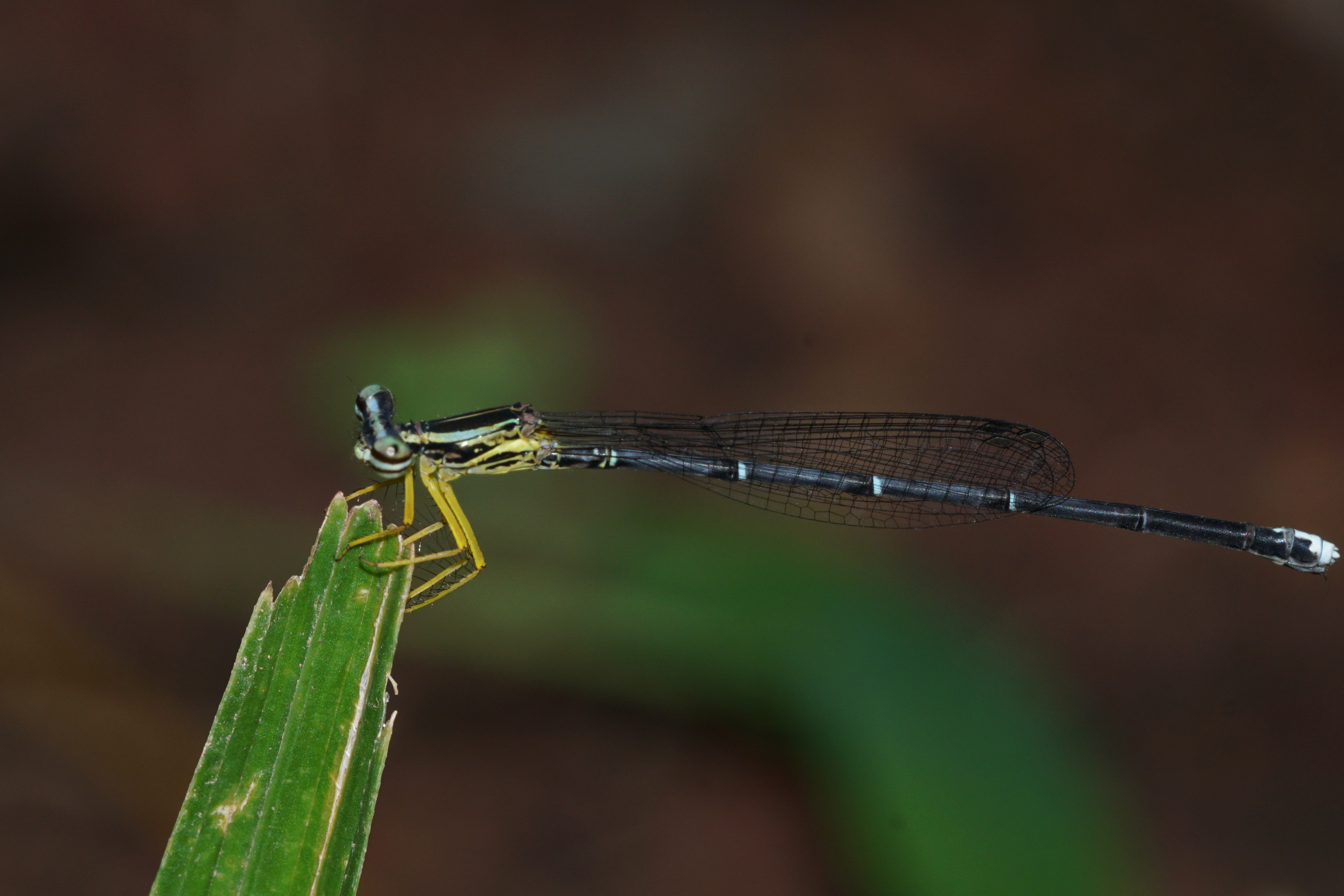
Female

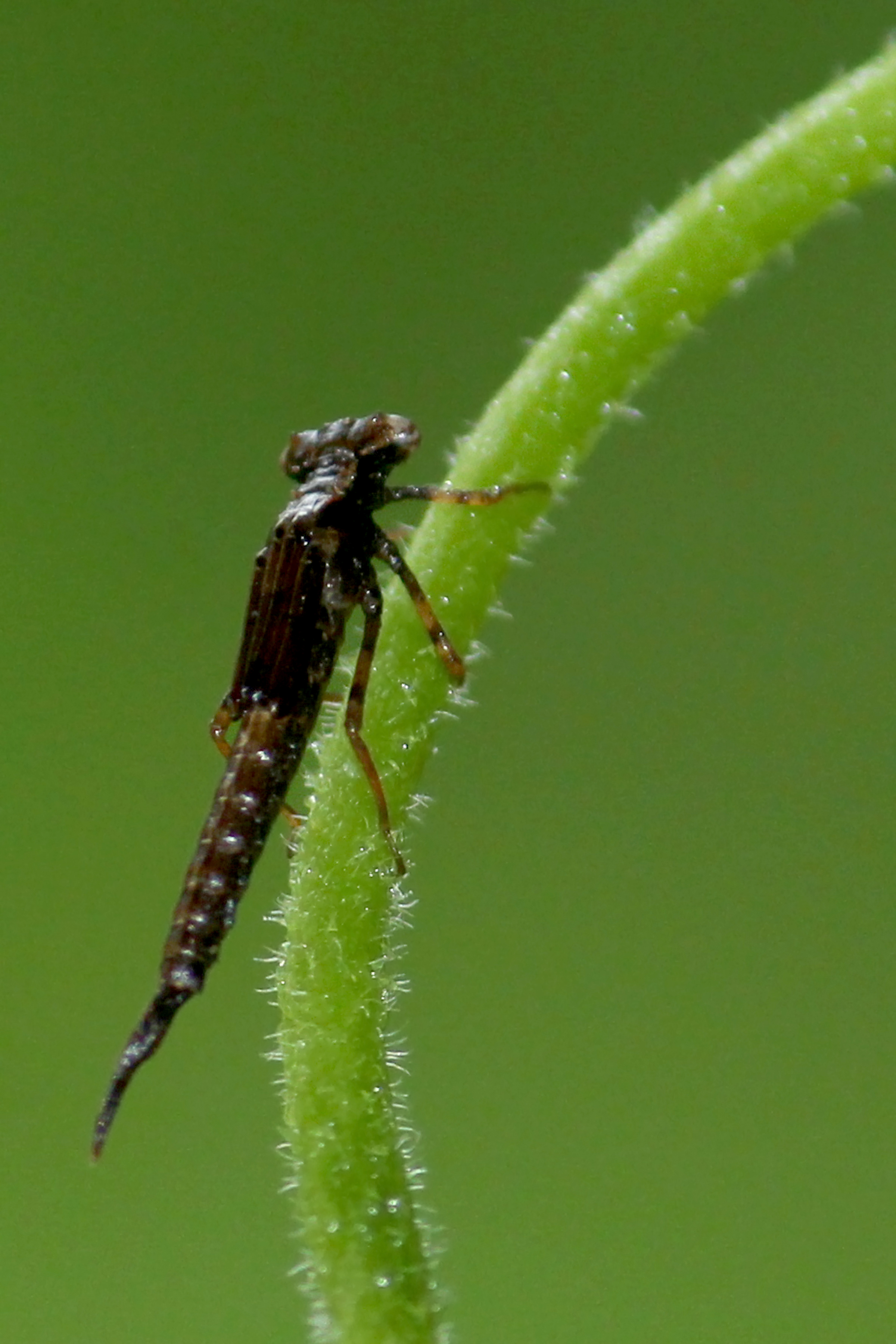
Larva

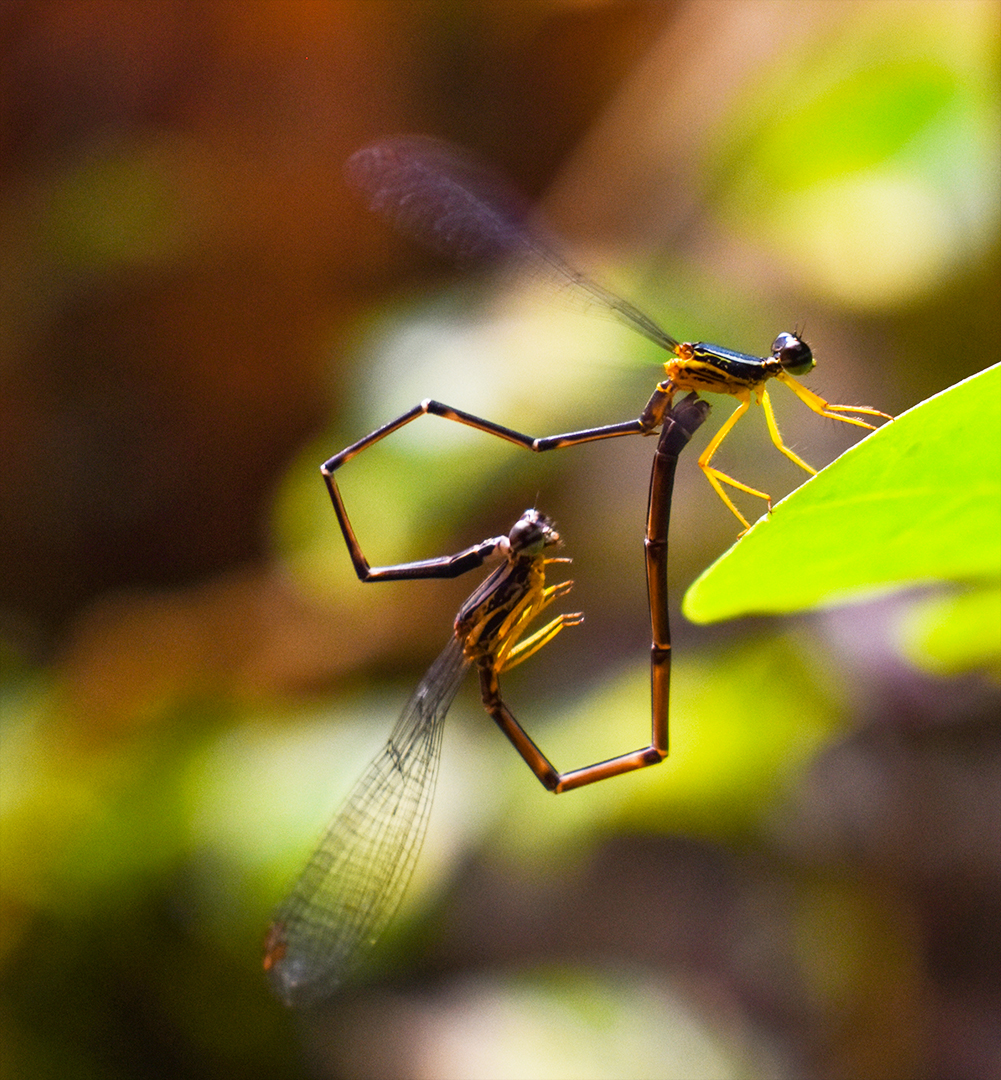
Mating

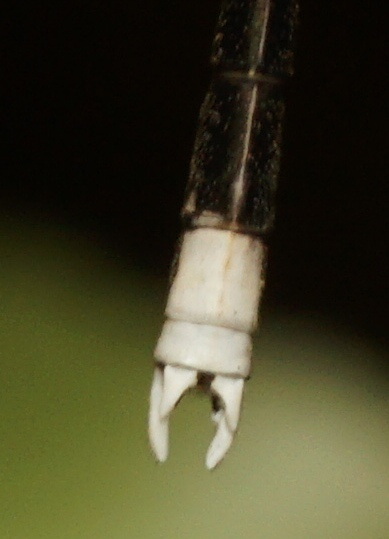
Anal appendages

==== Species: Disparoneura quadrimaculata - black-winged bambootail ====
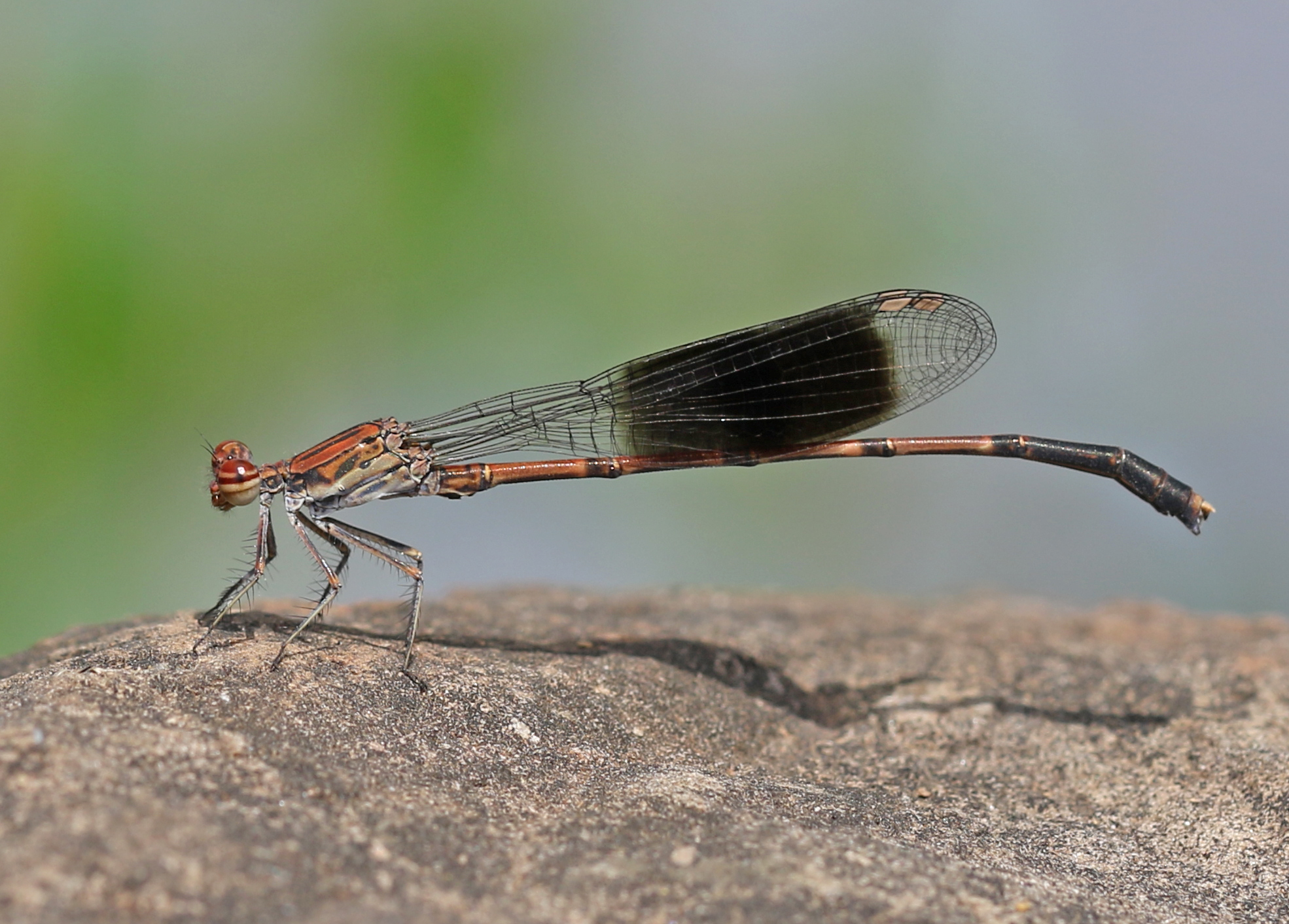
Male

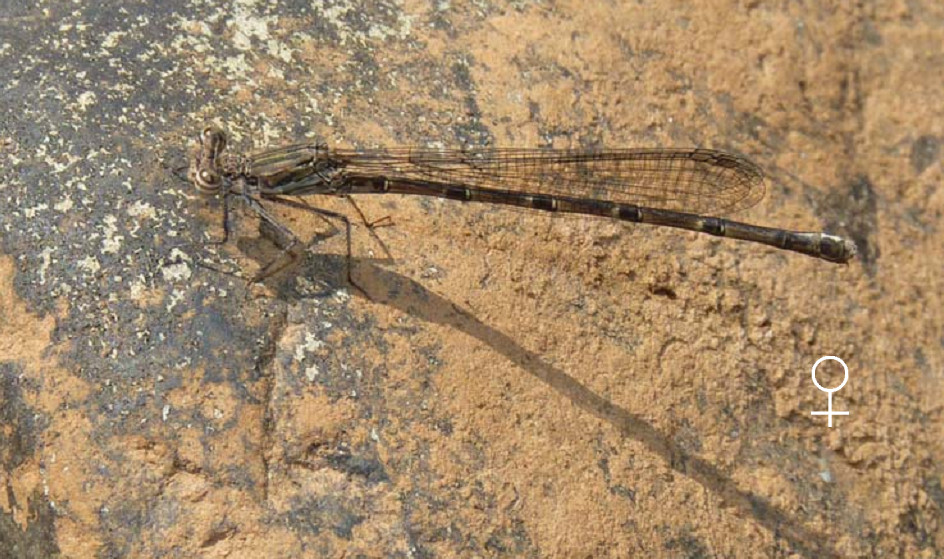
Female

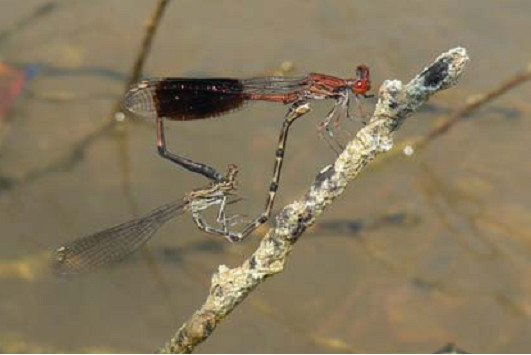
Mating

=== Family: Coenagrionidae ===
==== Species: Agriocnemis pygmaea - wandering midget ====
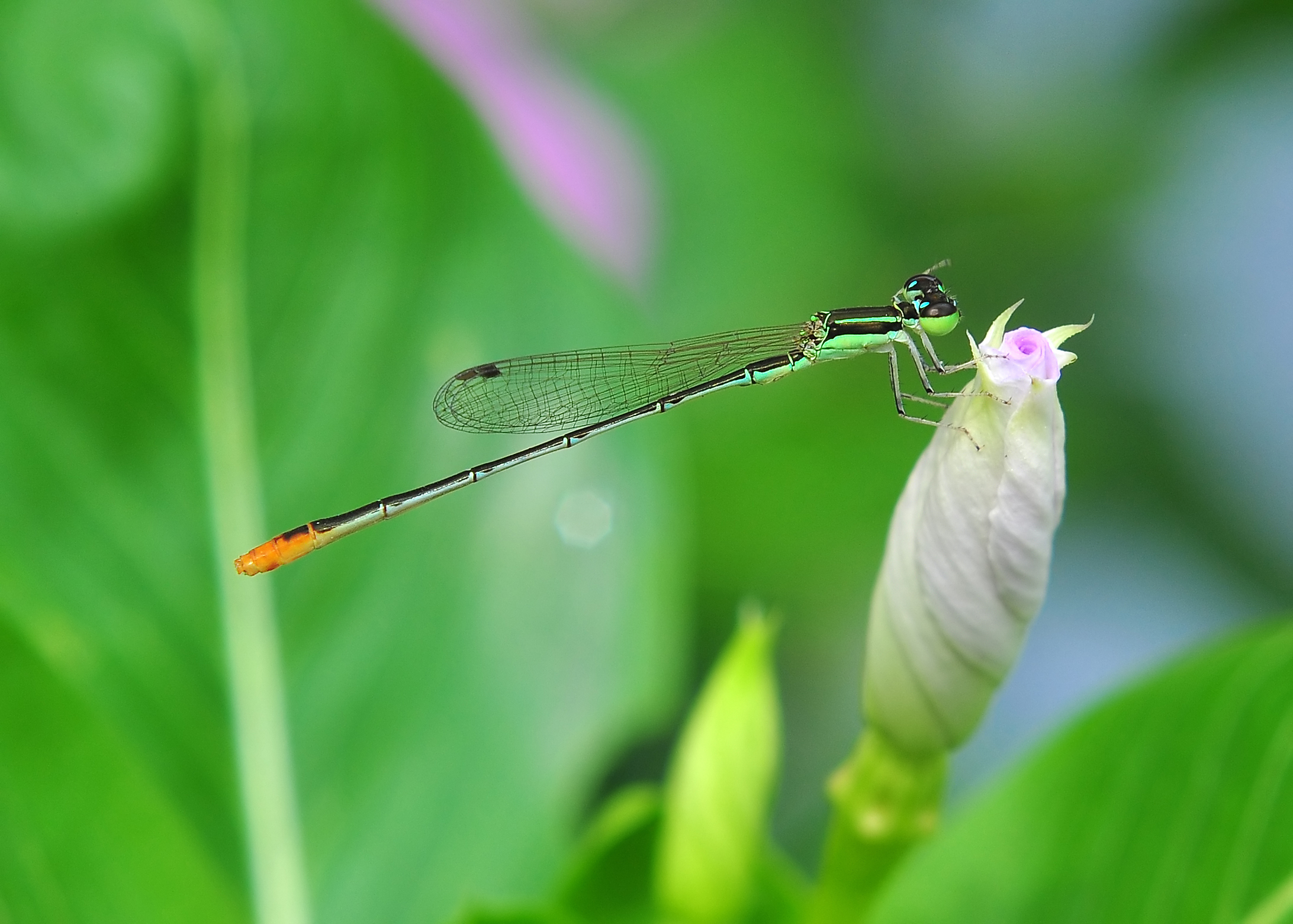
Male

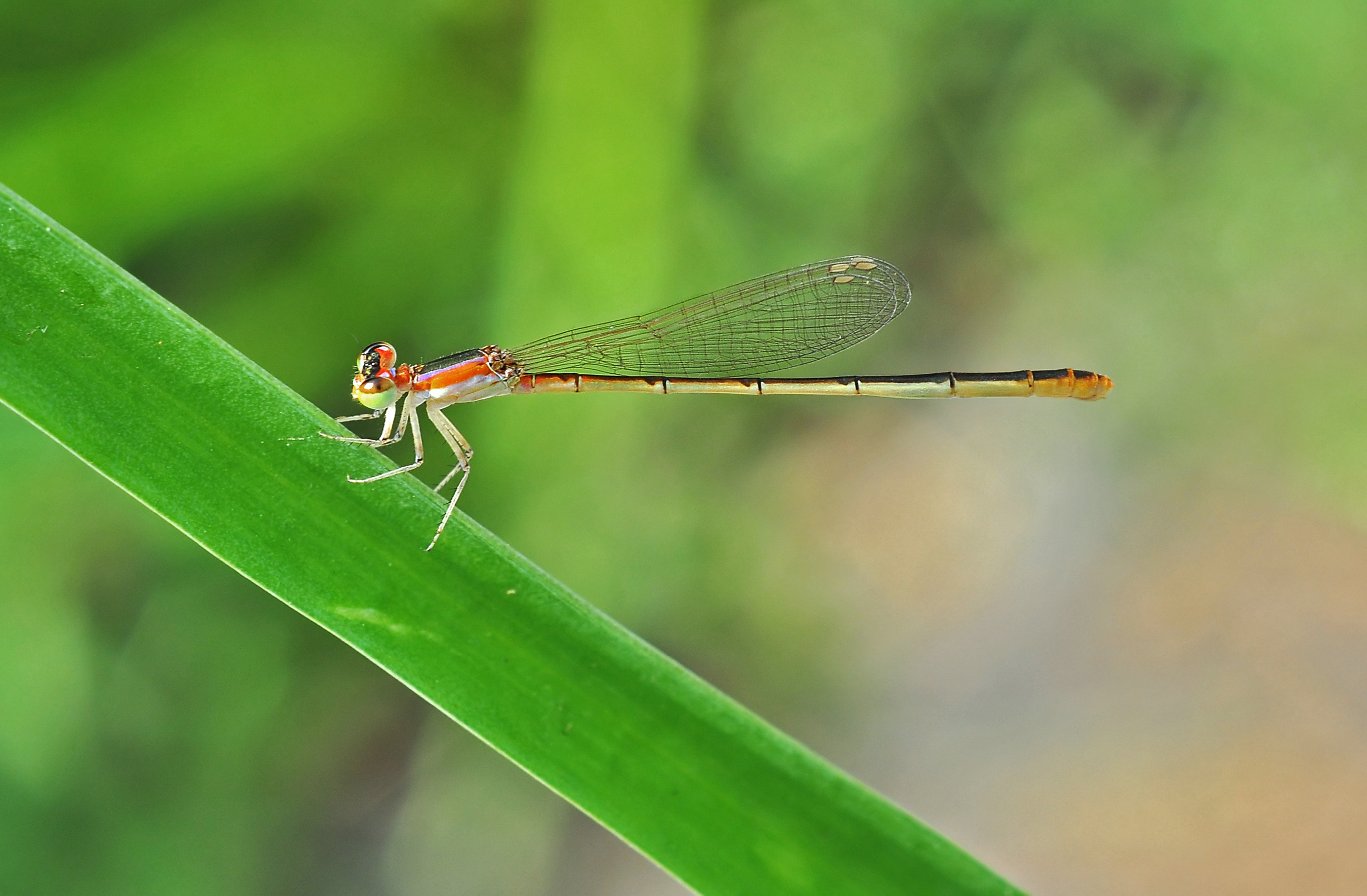
Female

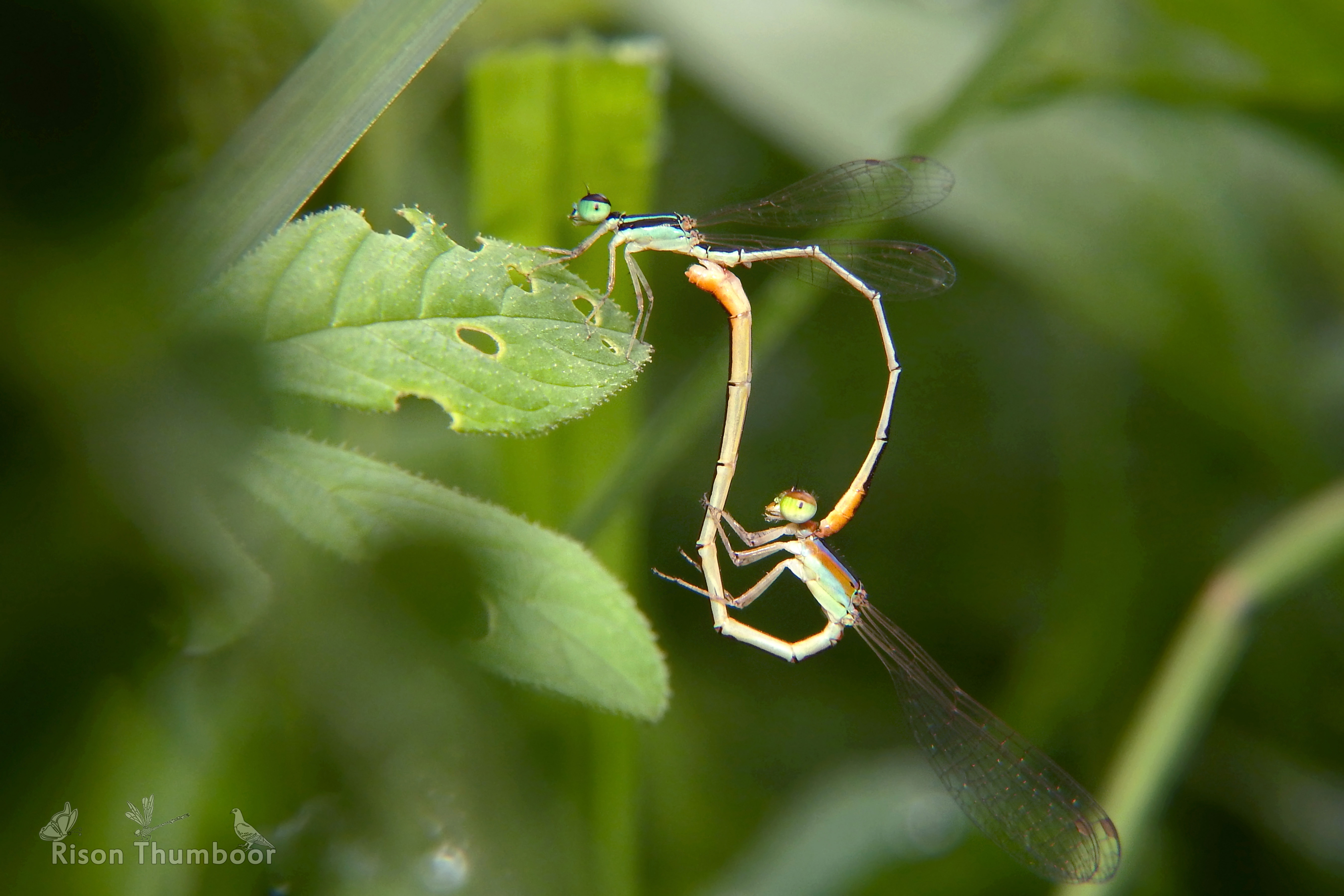
Mating

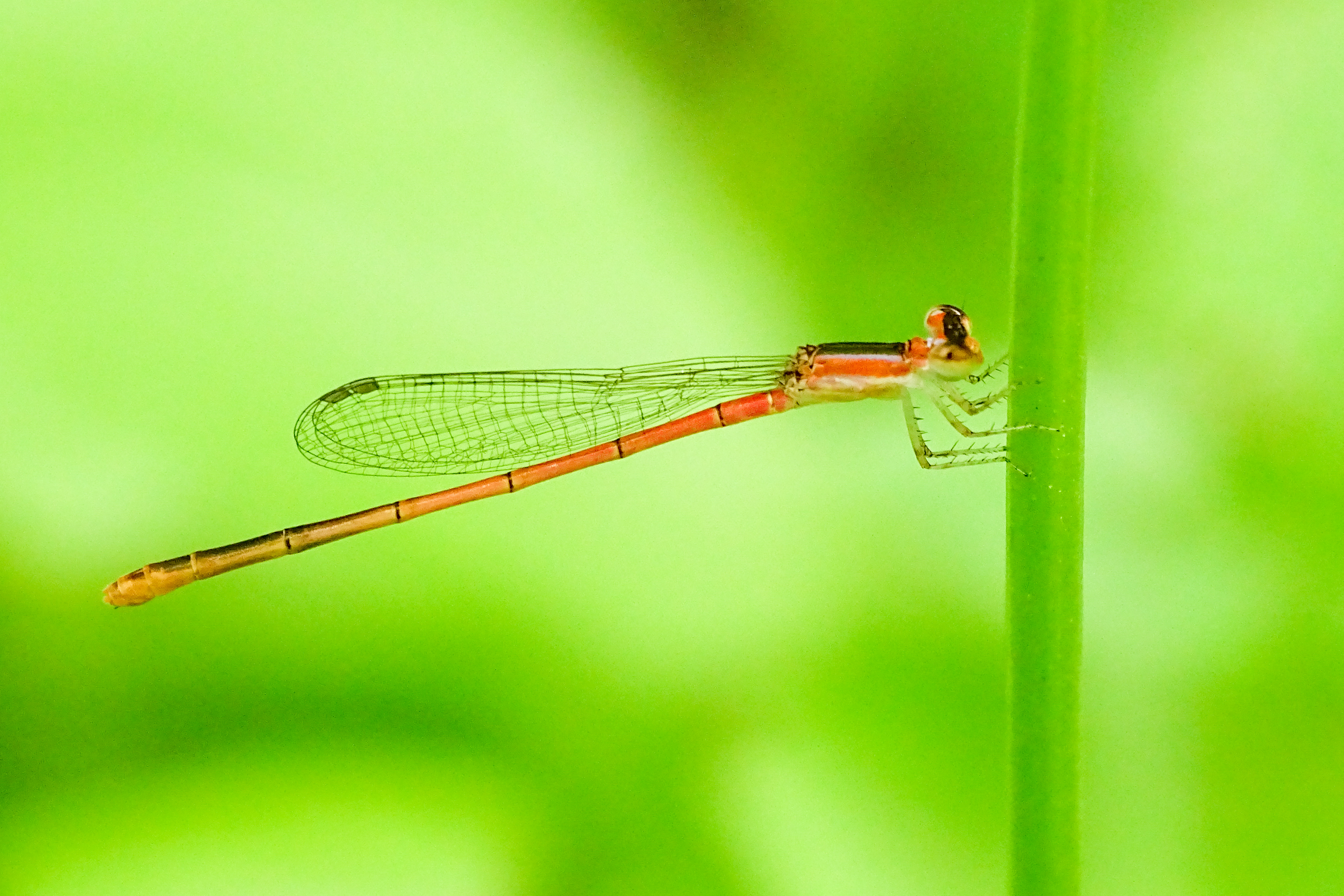
Young female

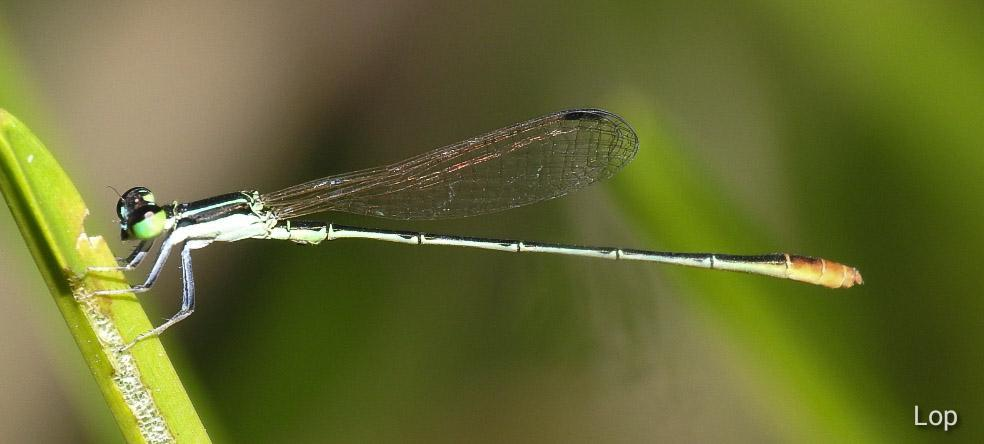
Male with silver pruinescence

==== Species: Amphiallagma parvum - azure dartlet ====
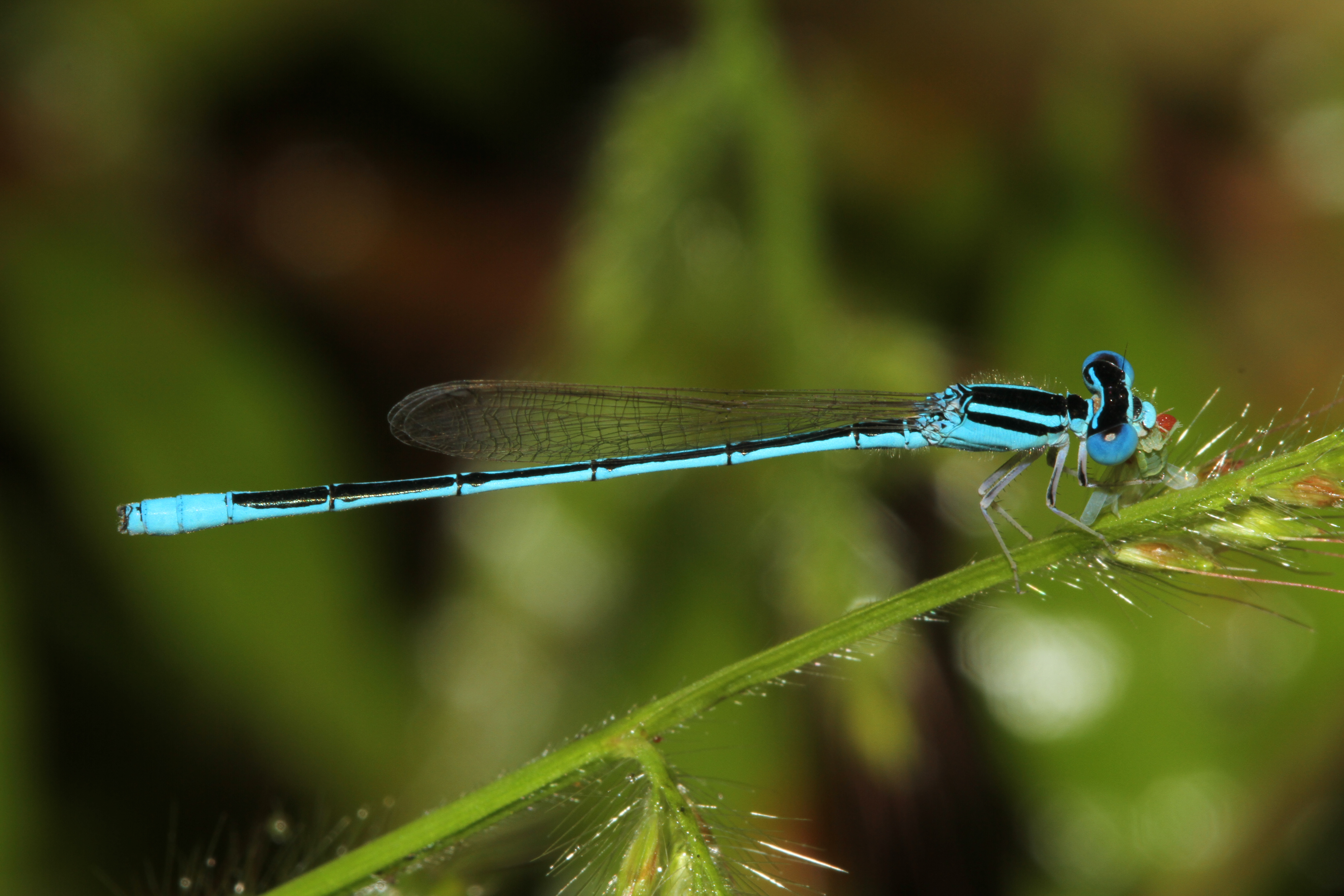
Male

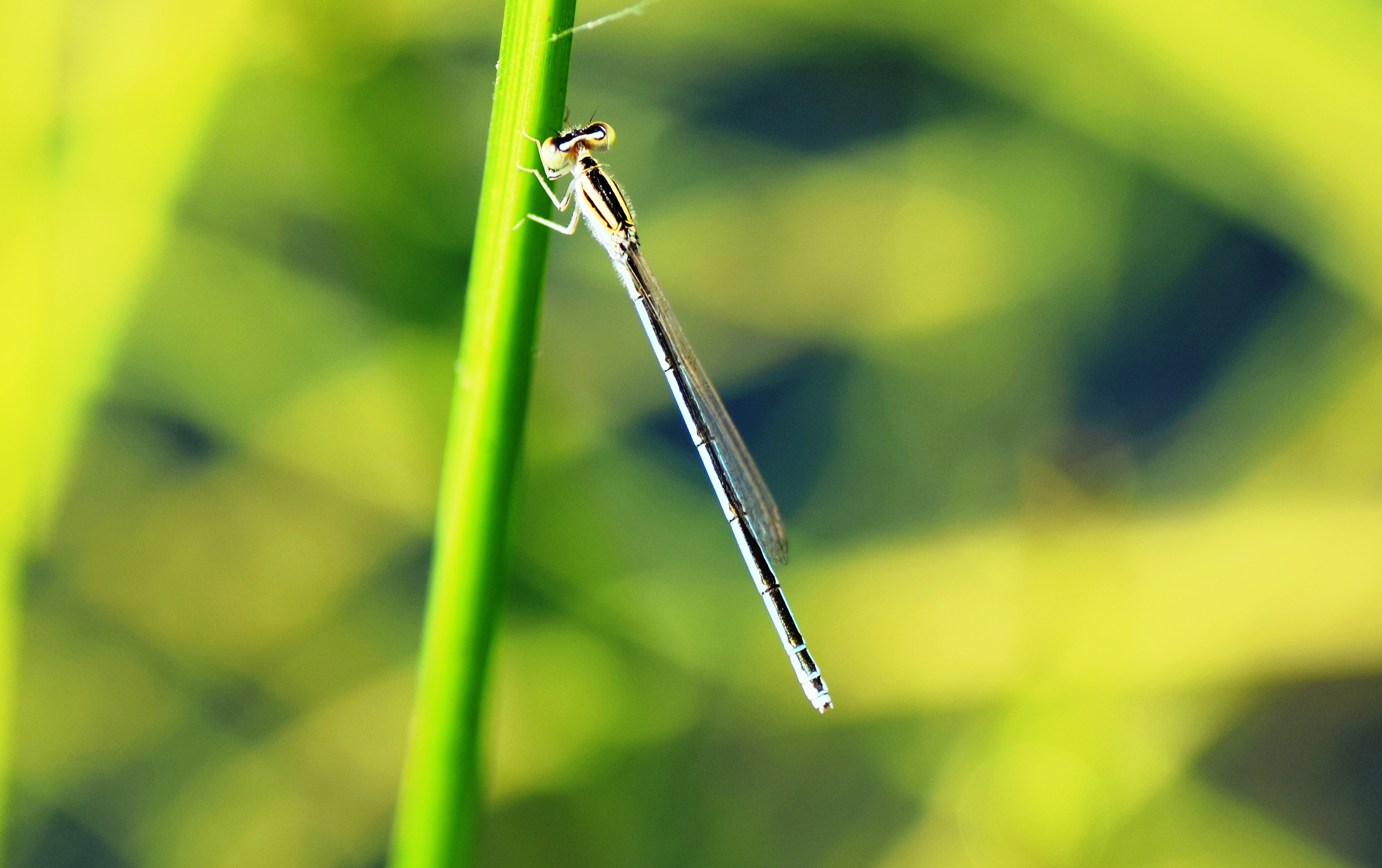
Female

==== Species: Ceriagrion coromandelianum - coromandel marsh dart ====
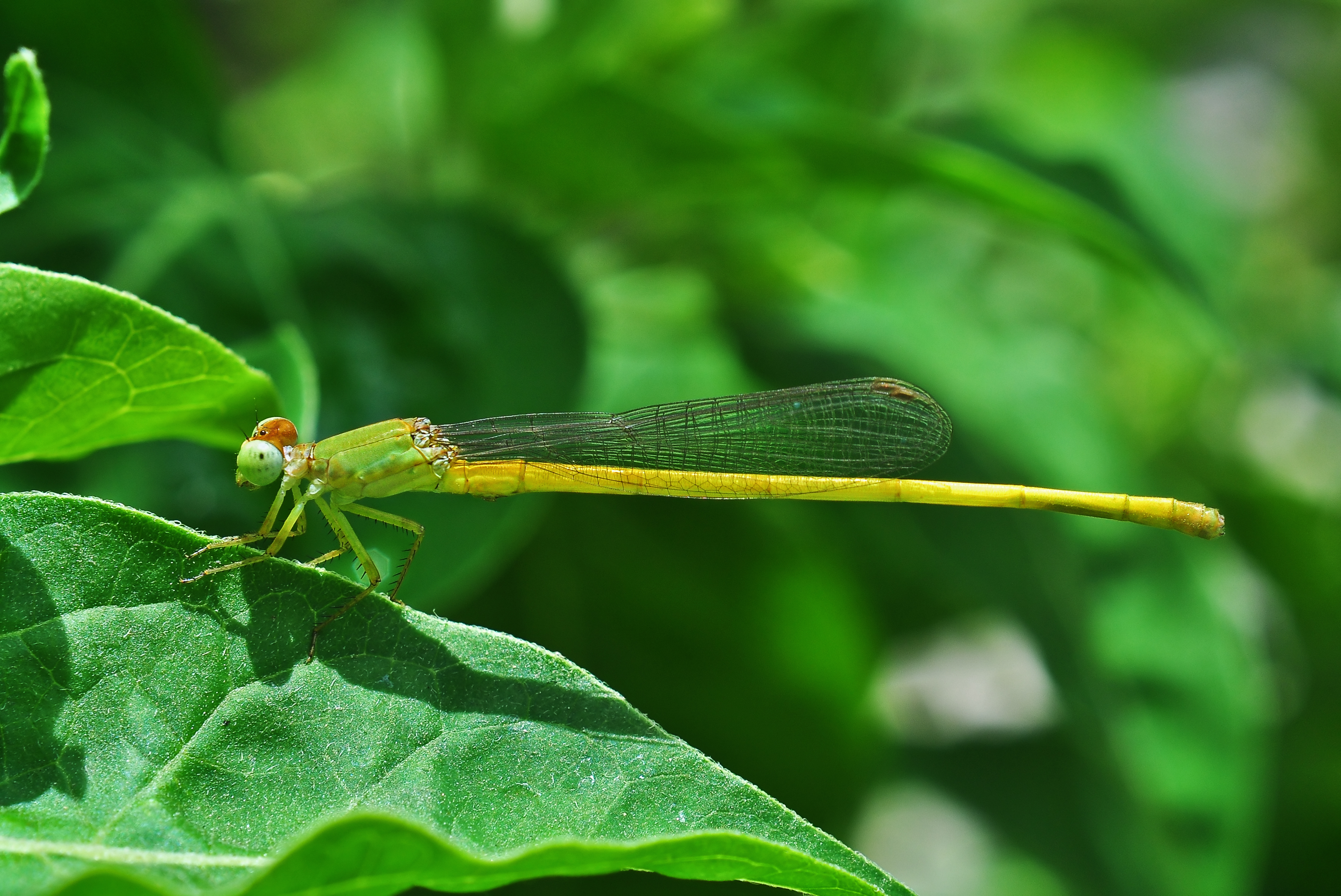
Male

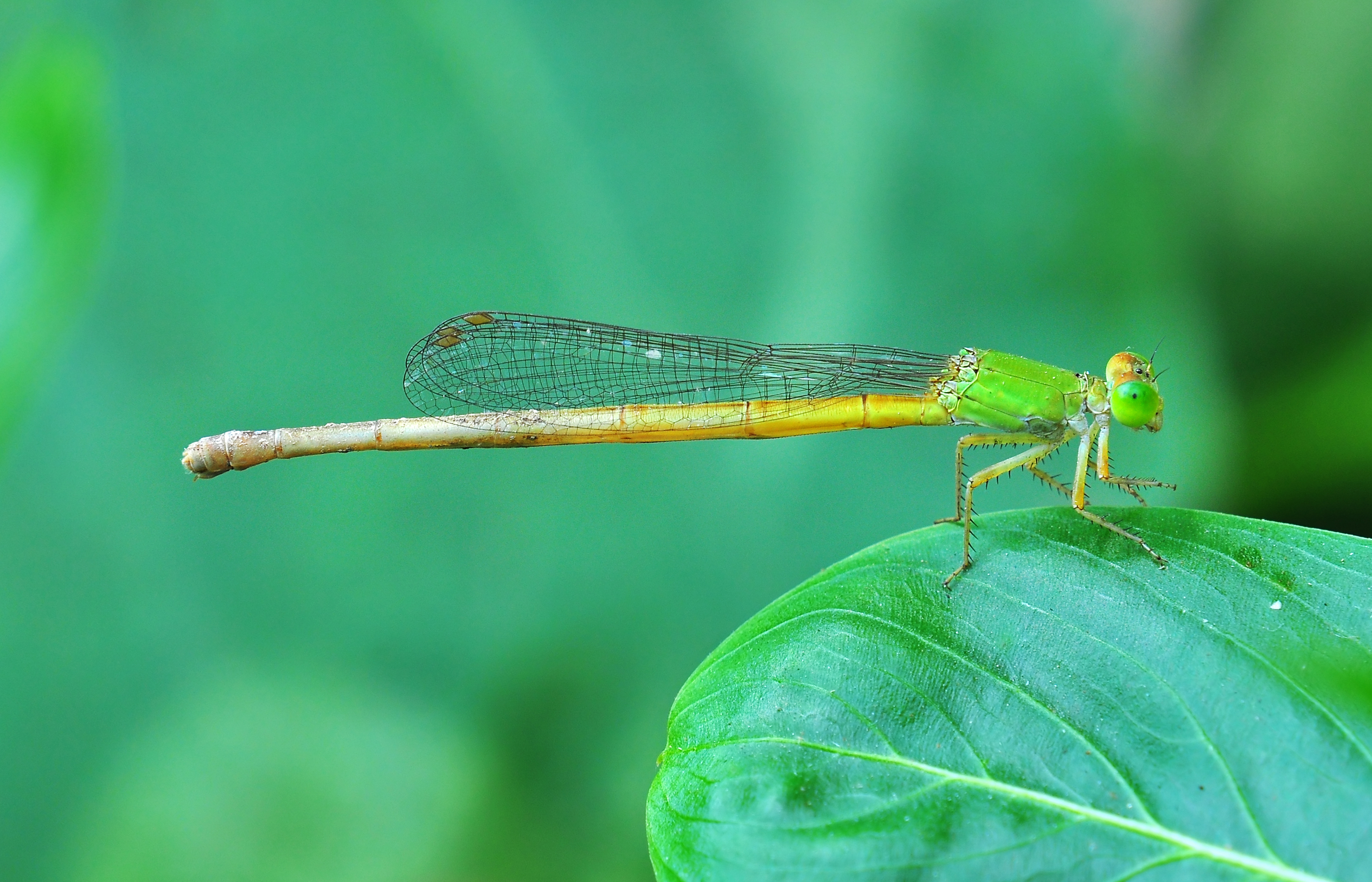
Female

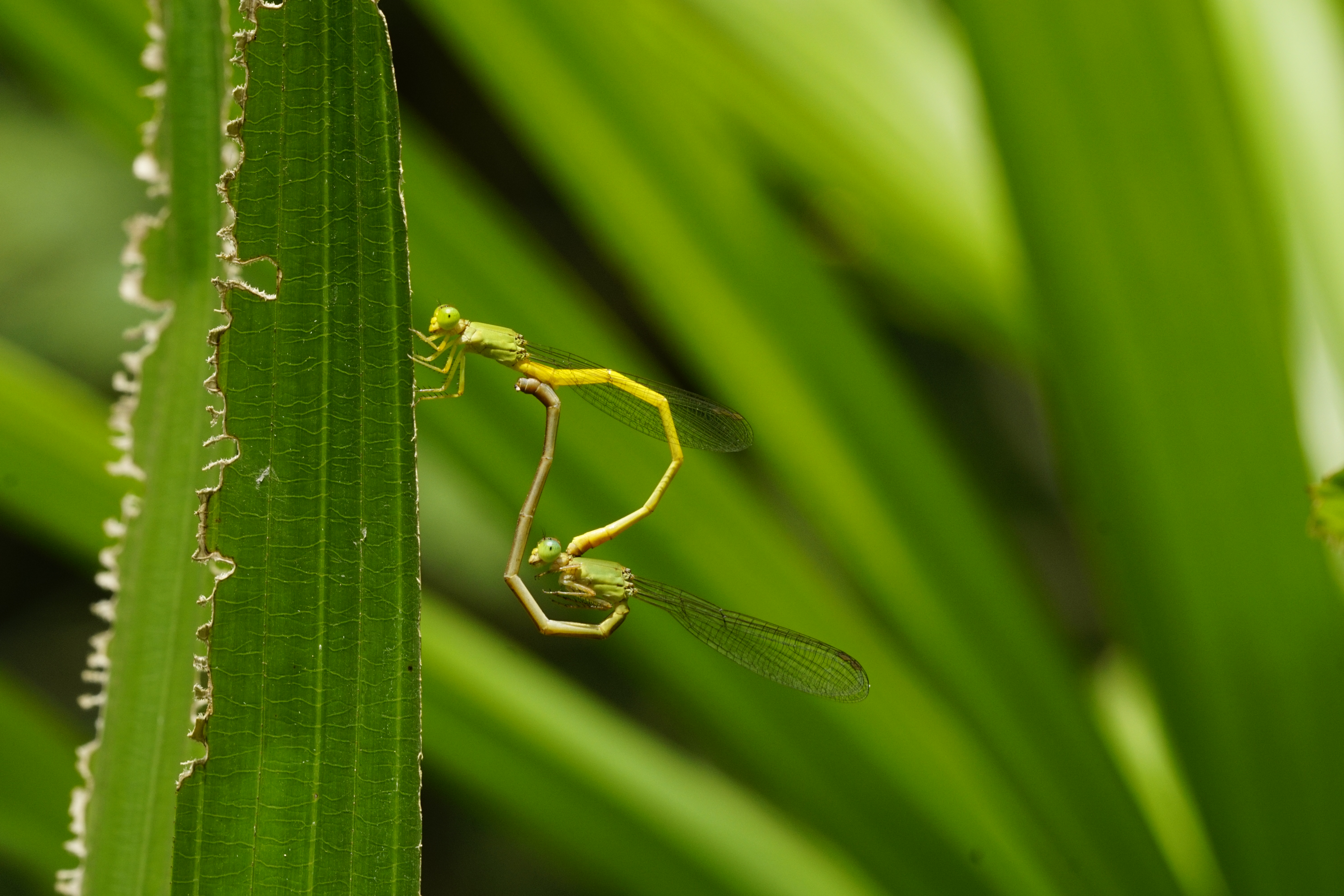
Mating

==== Species: Ischnura nursei ====
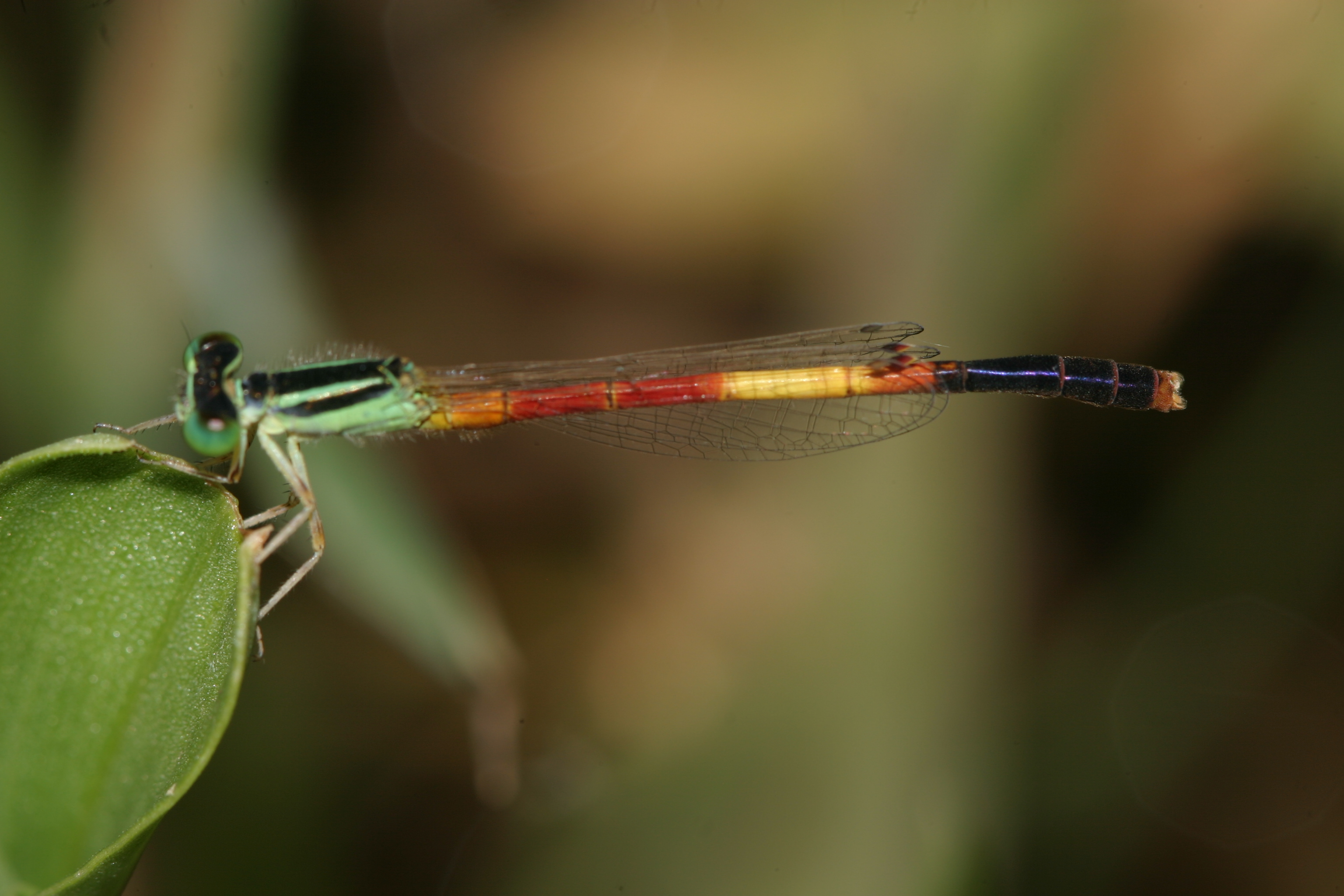
Male

==== Species: Ischnura rubilio - western golden dartlet ====
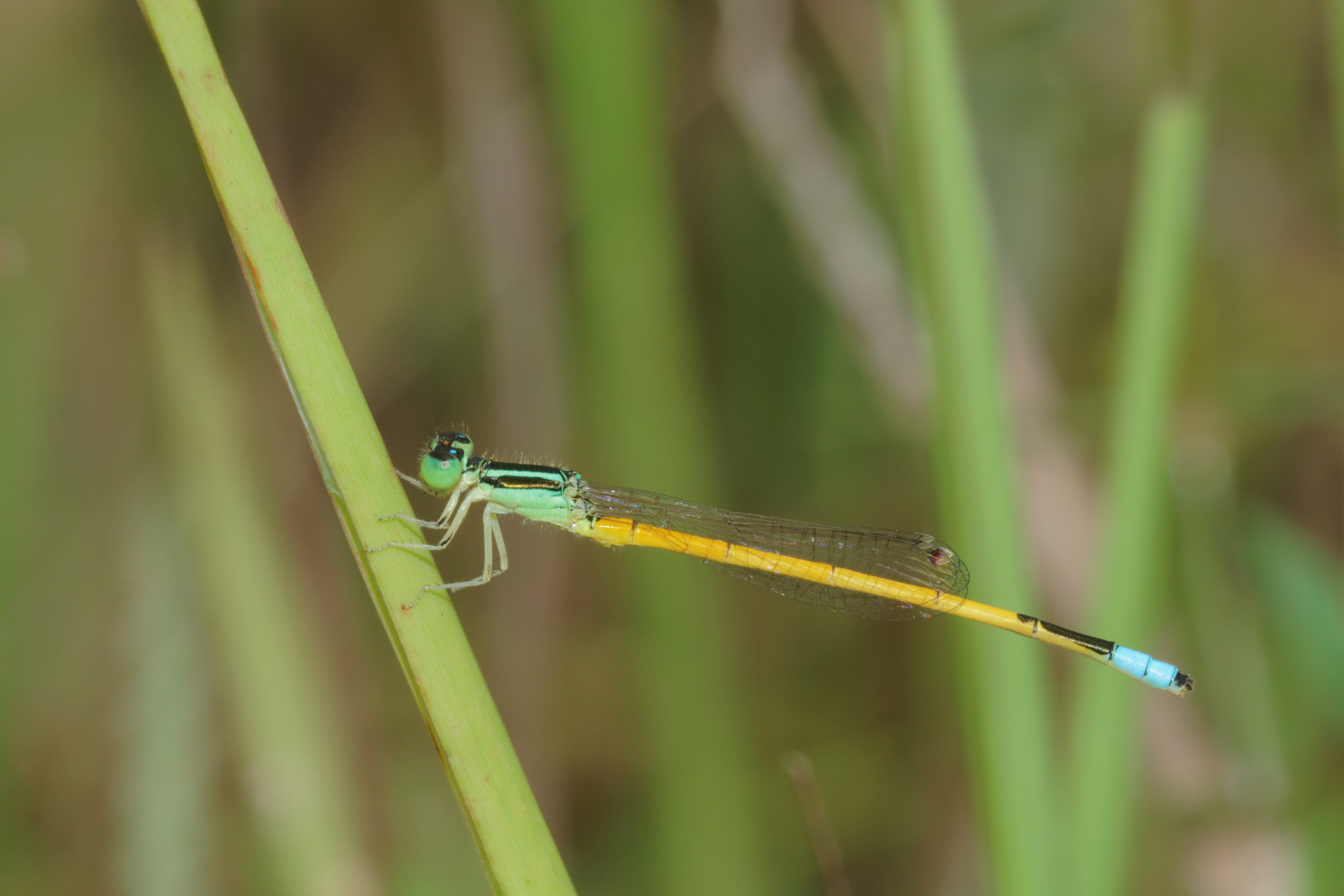
Male

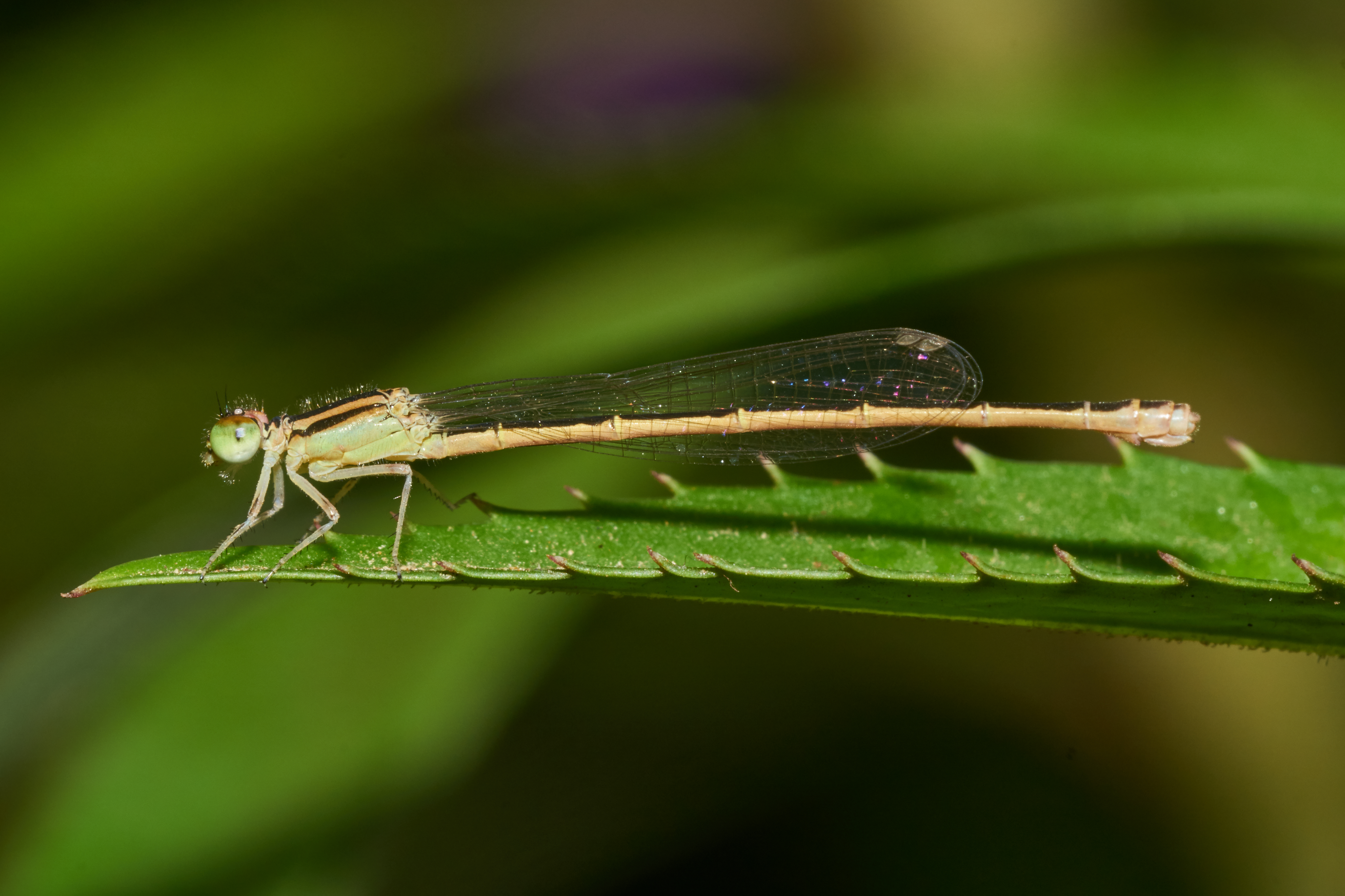
Female

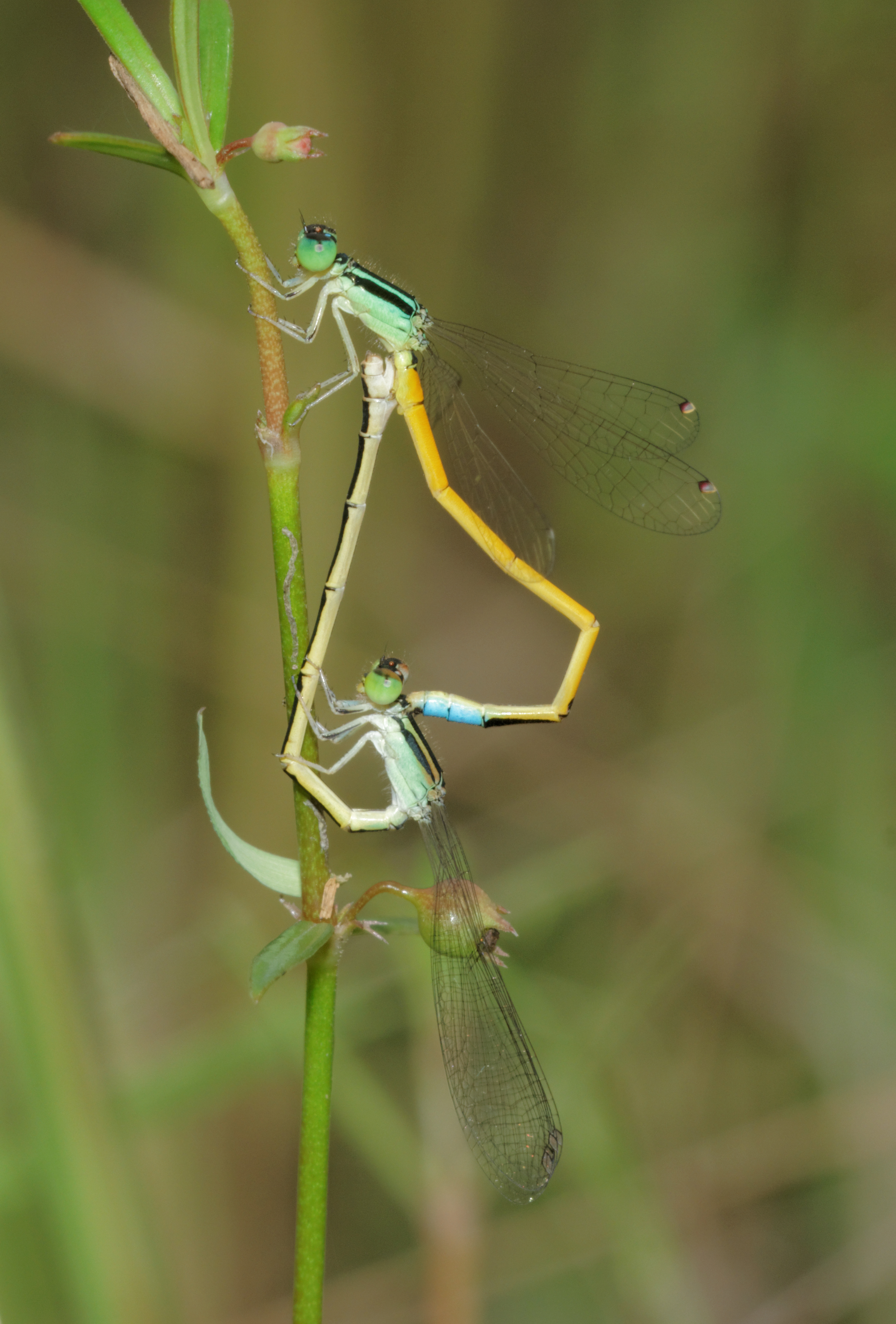
Mating

==== Species: Ischnura senegalensis - common dartlet ====
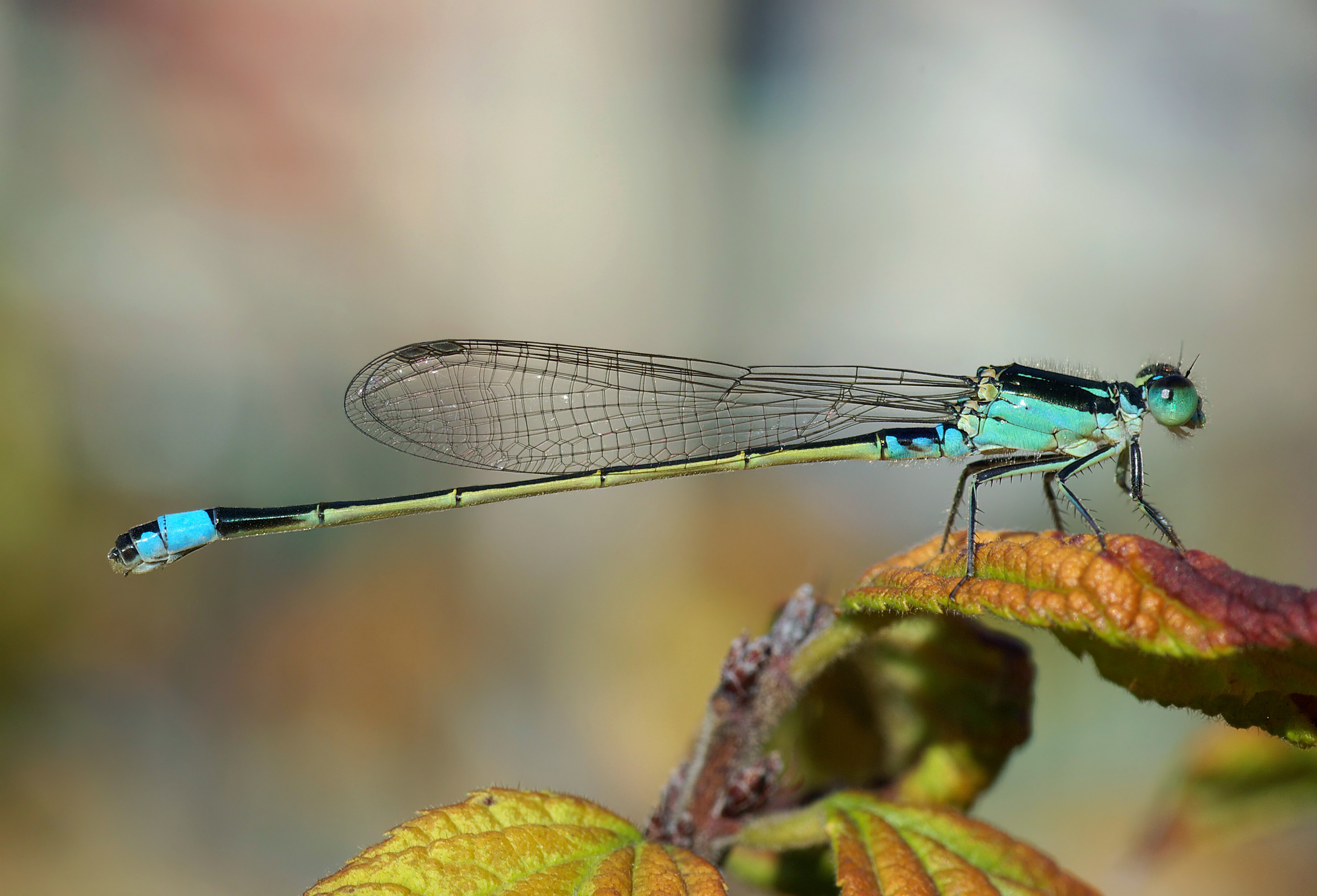
Male

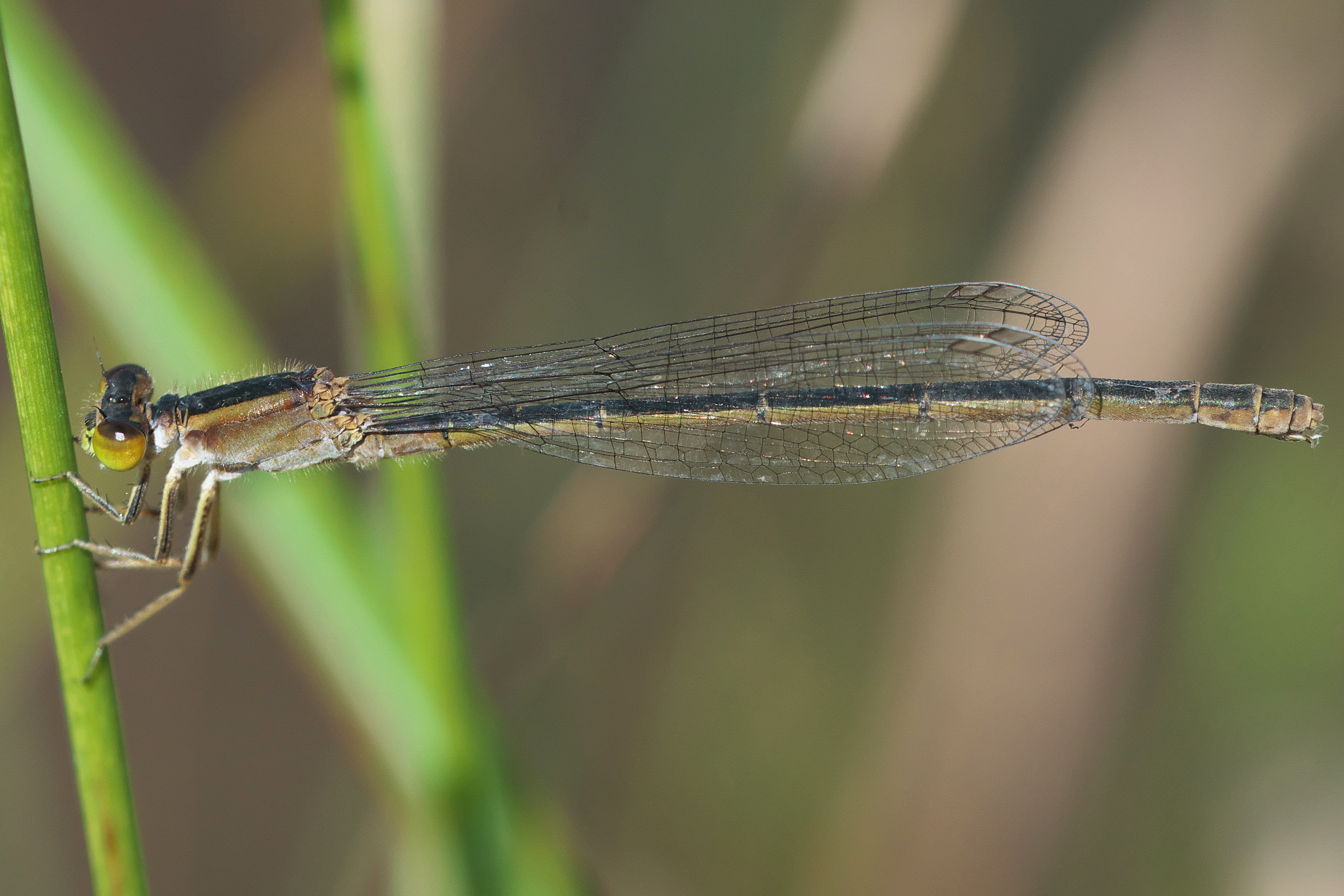
Female

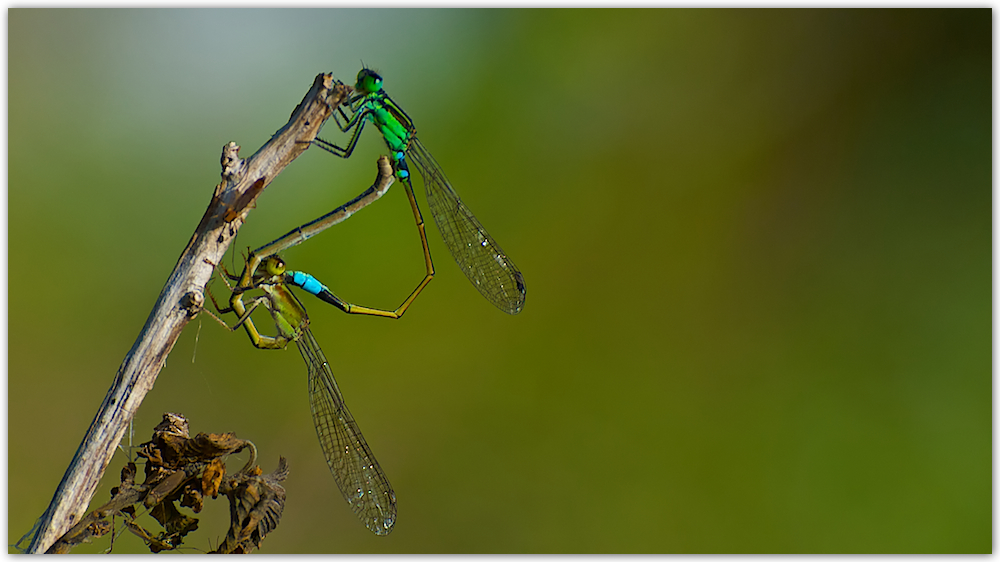
Mating

==== Species: Paracercion melanotum - eastern lilysquatter ====
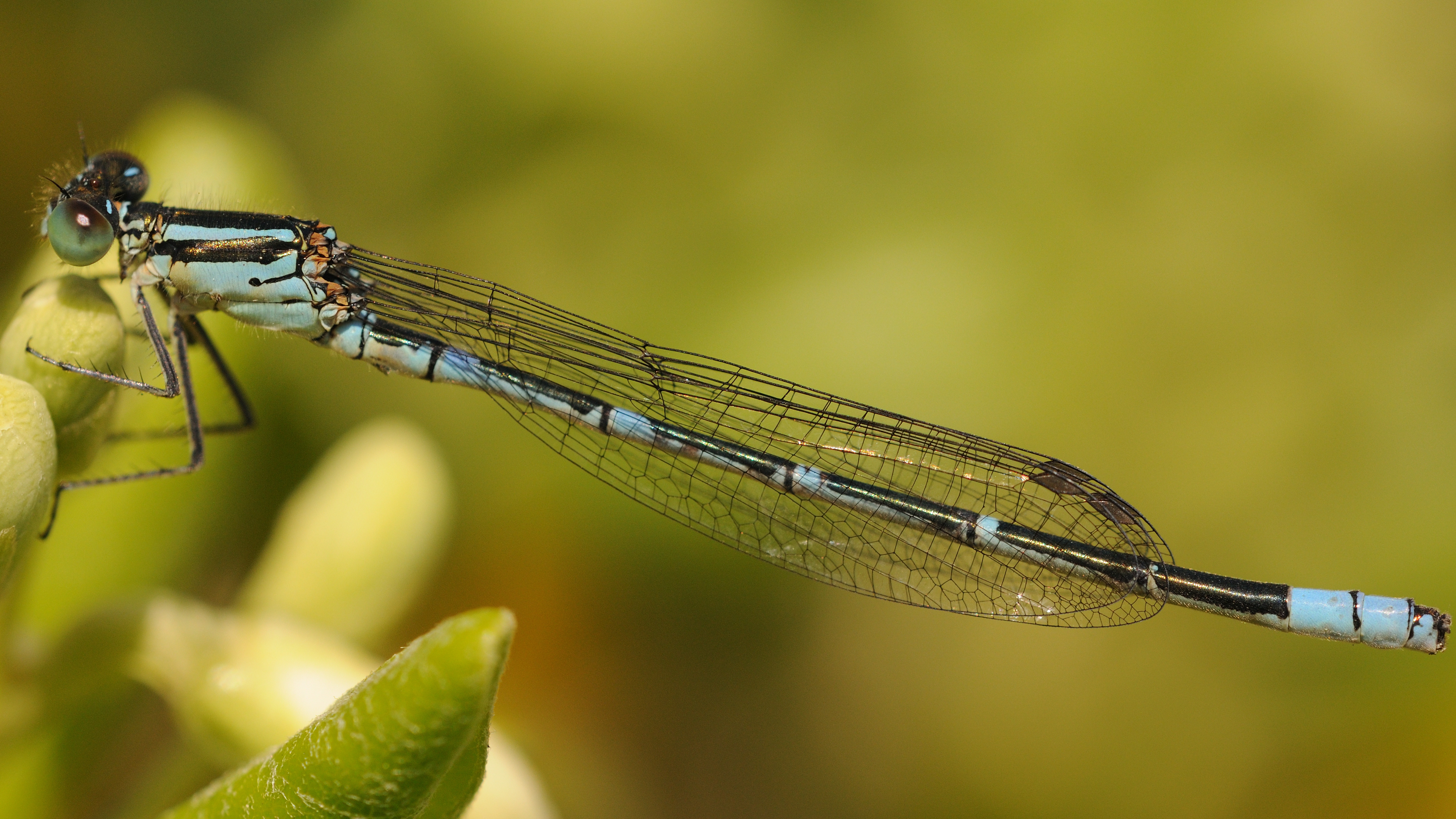
Male

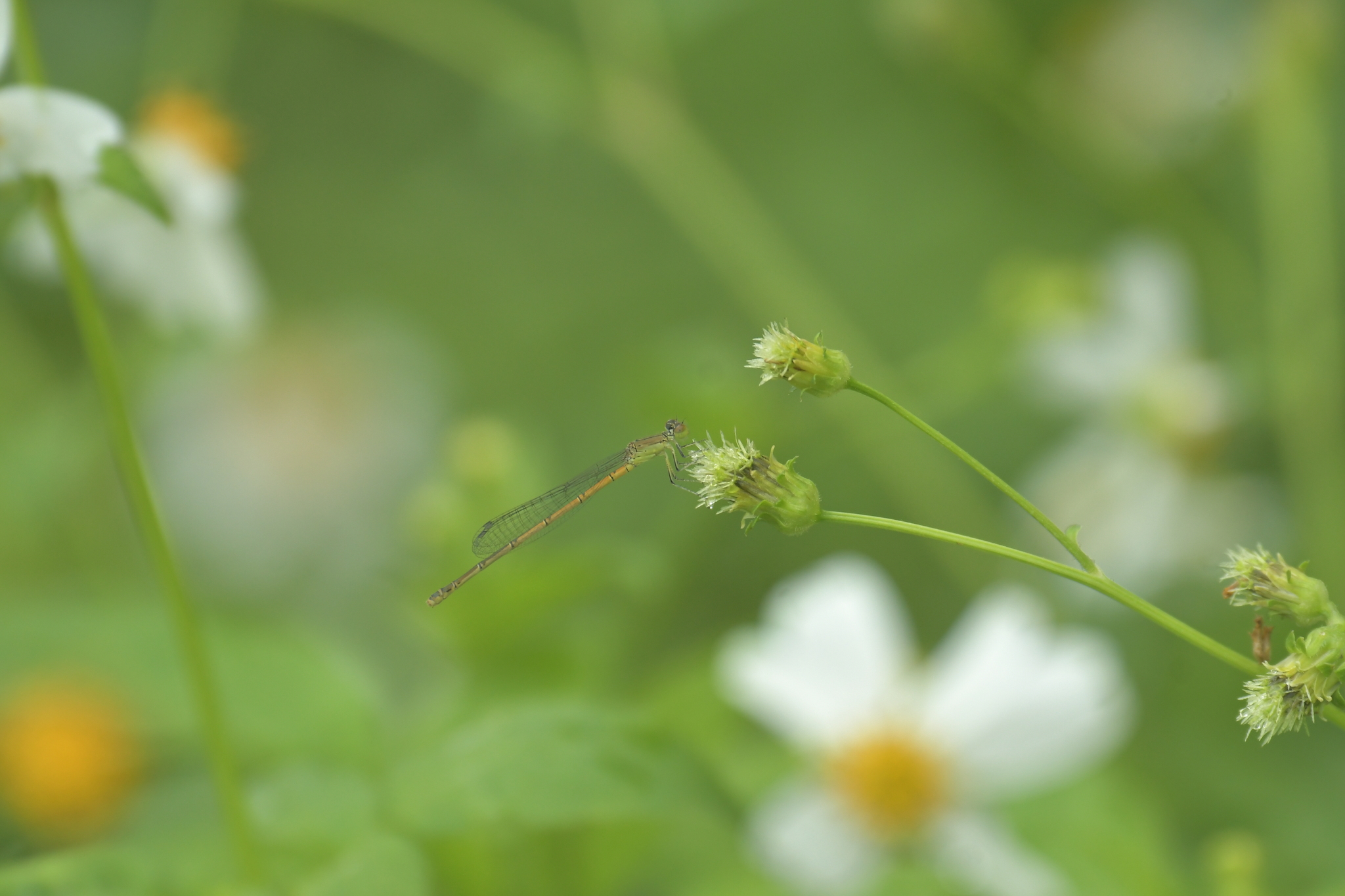
Female

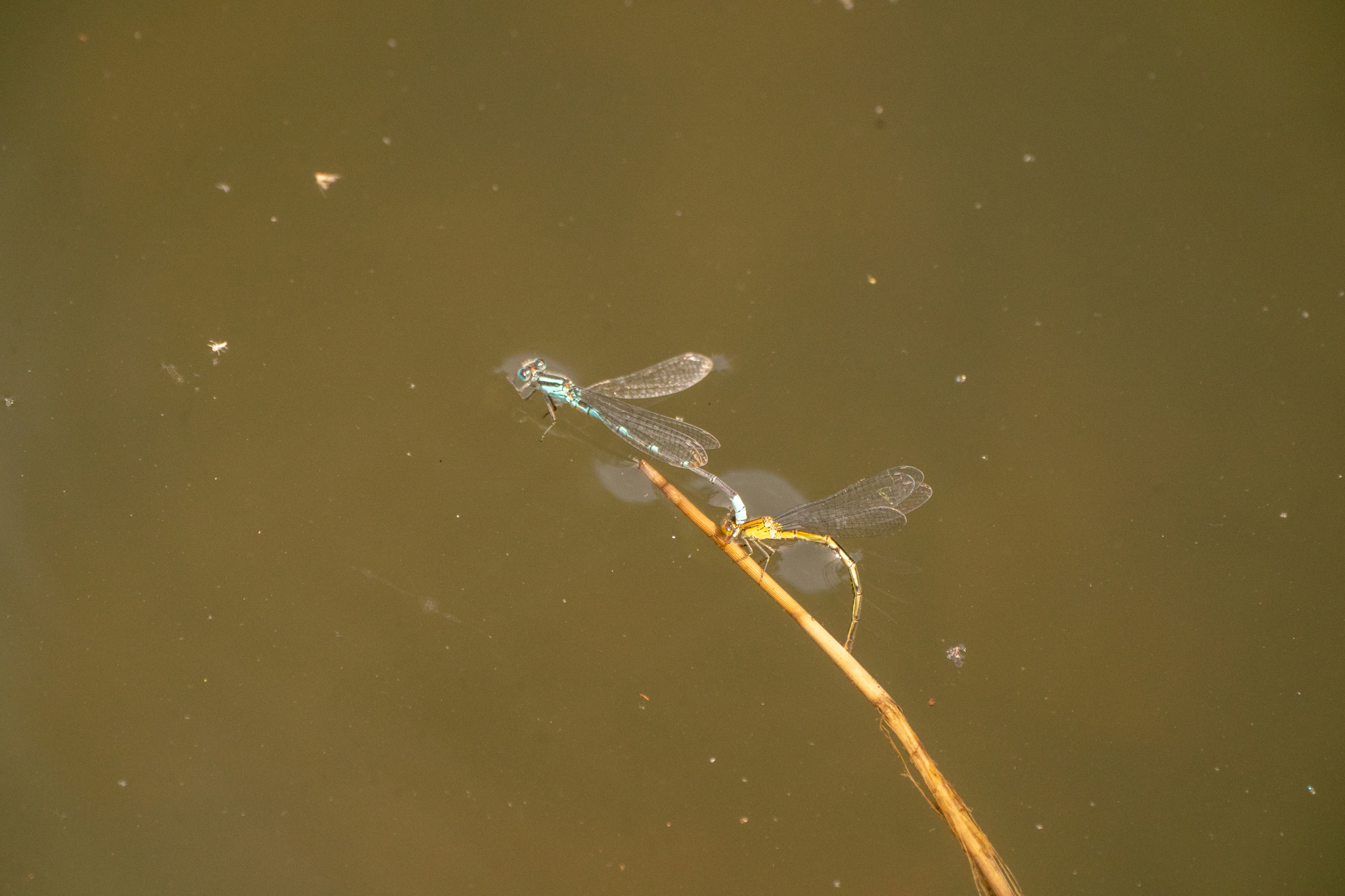
Mating

==== Species: Pseudagrion decorum - three-striped blue dart ====
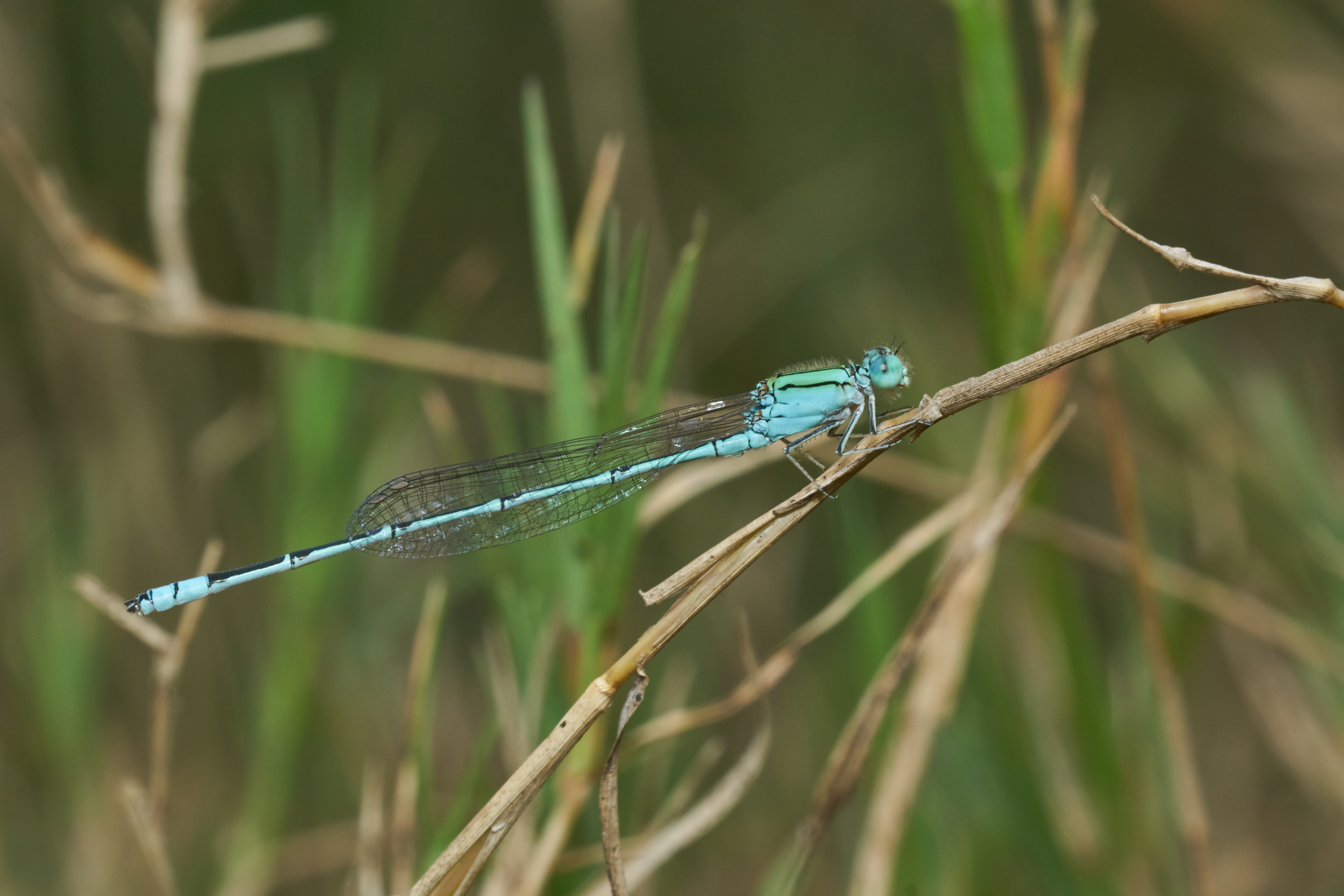
Male

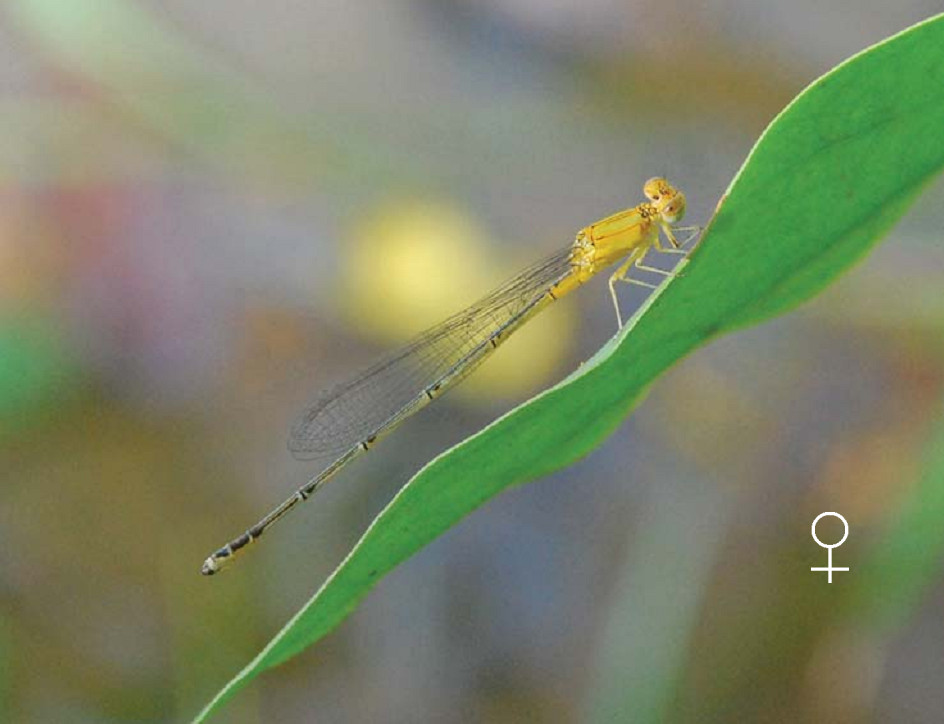
Female

==== Species: Pseudagrion microcephalum - blue riverdamsel ====
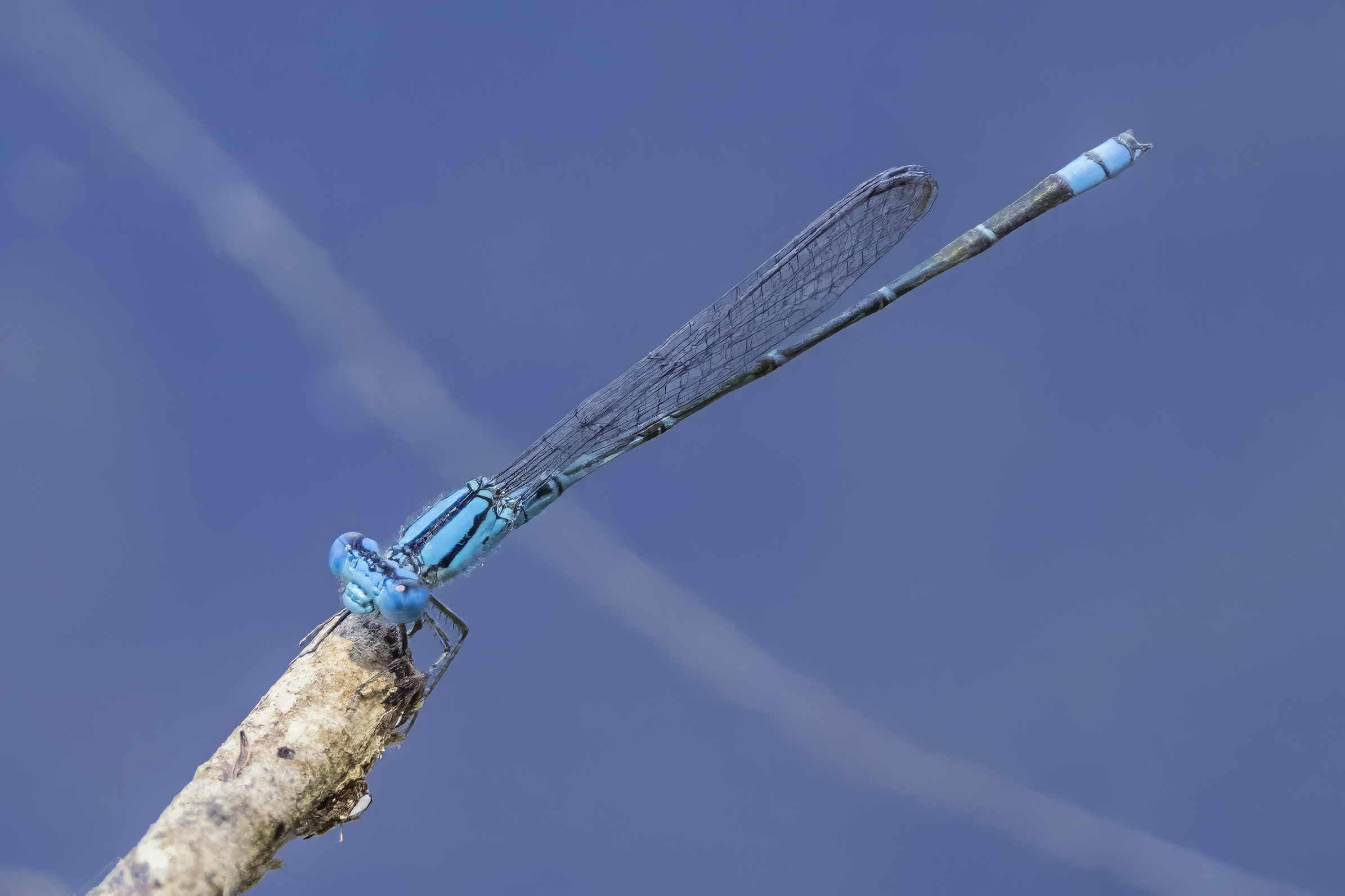
Male

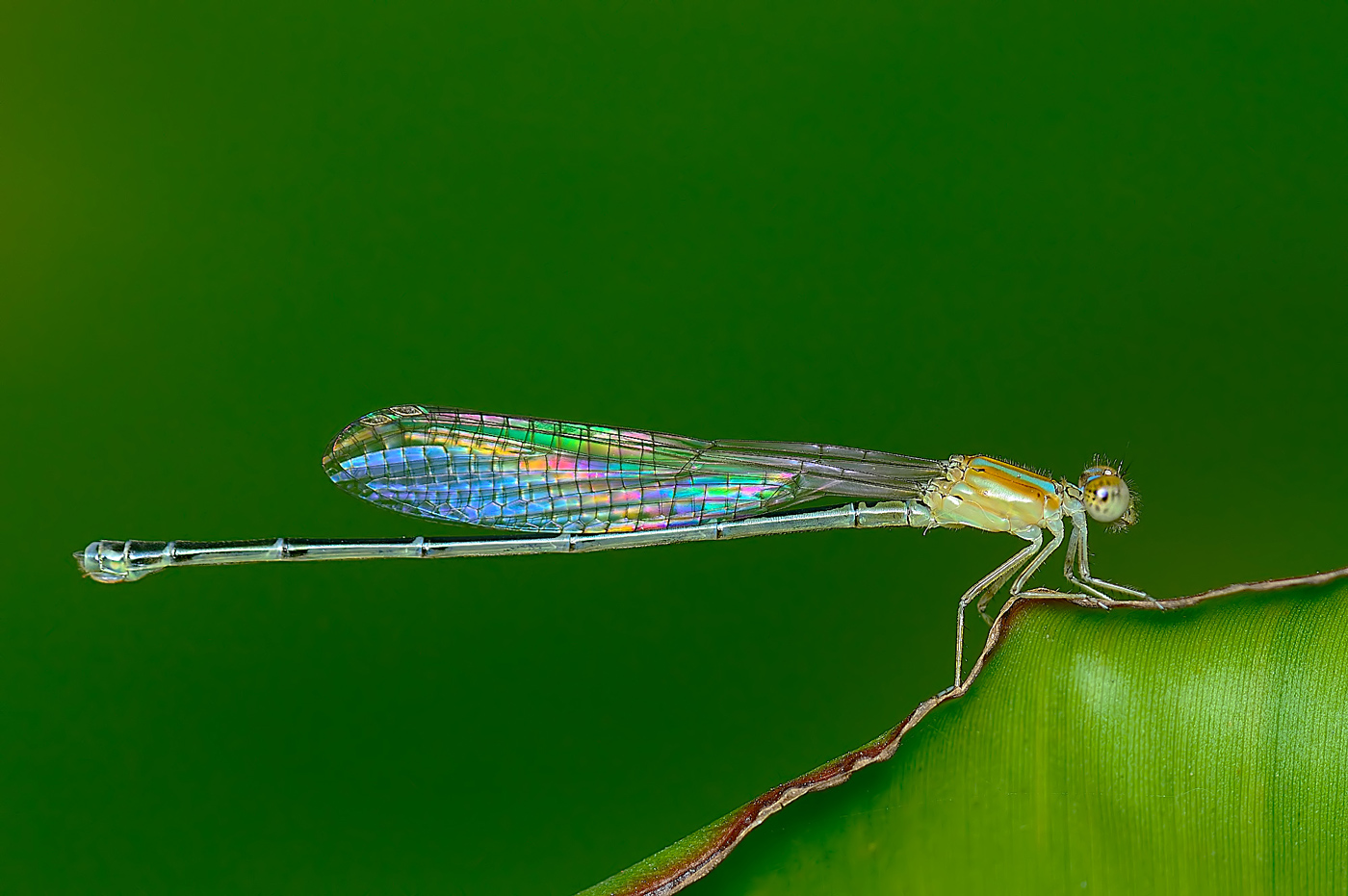
Female

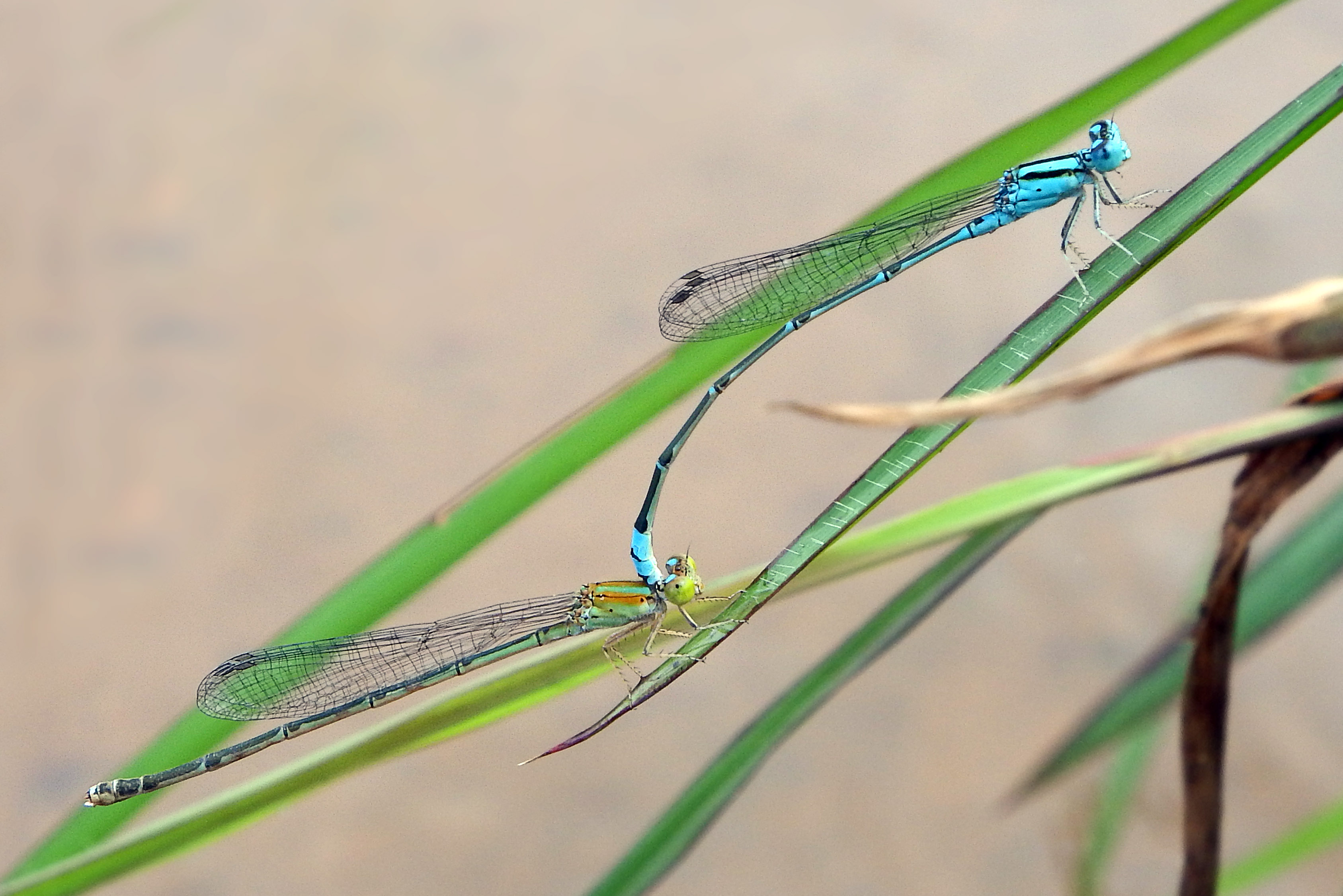
Mating

==== Species: Pseudagrion rubriceps - orange-faced sprite ====
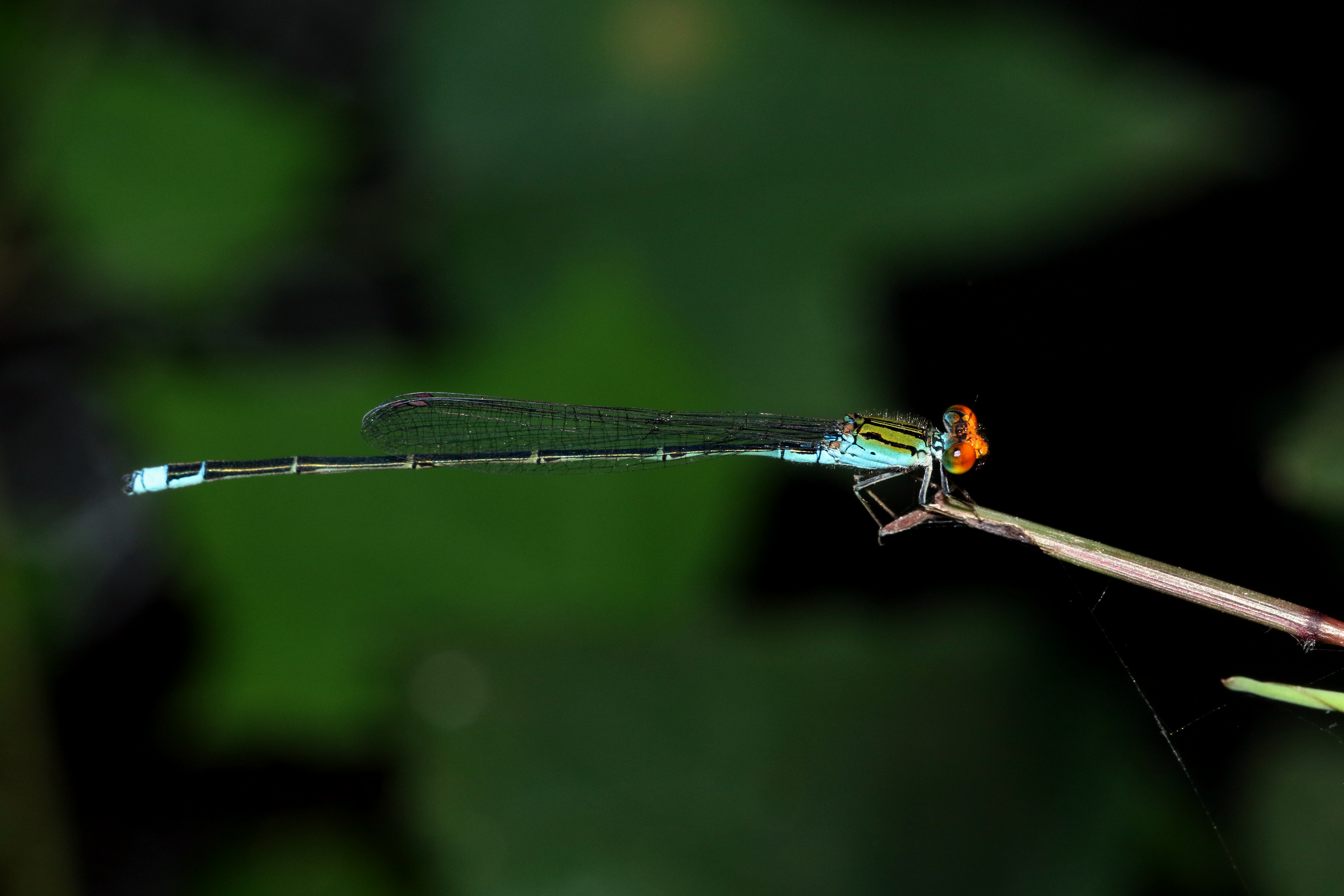
Male

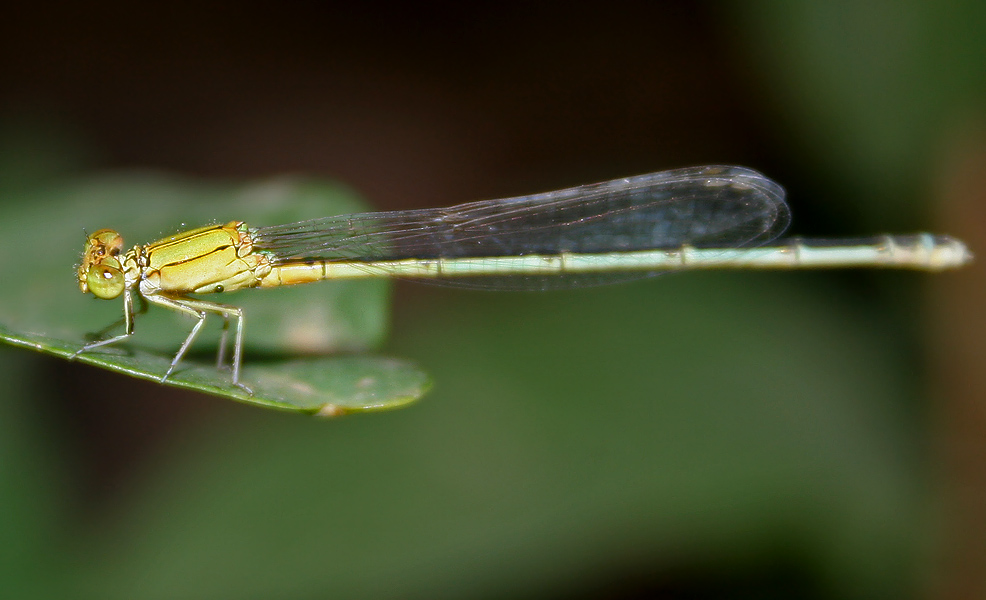
Female

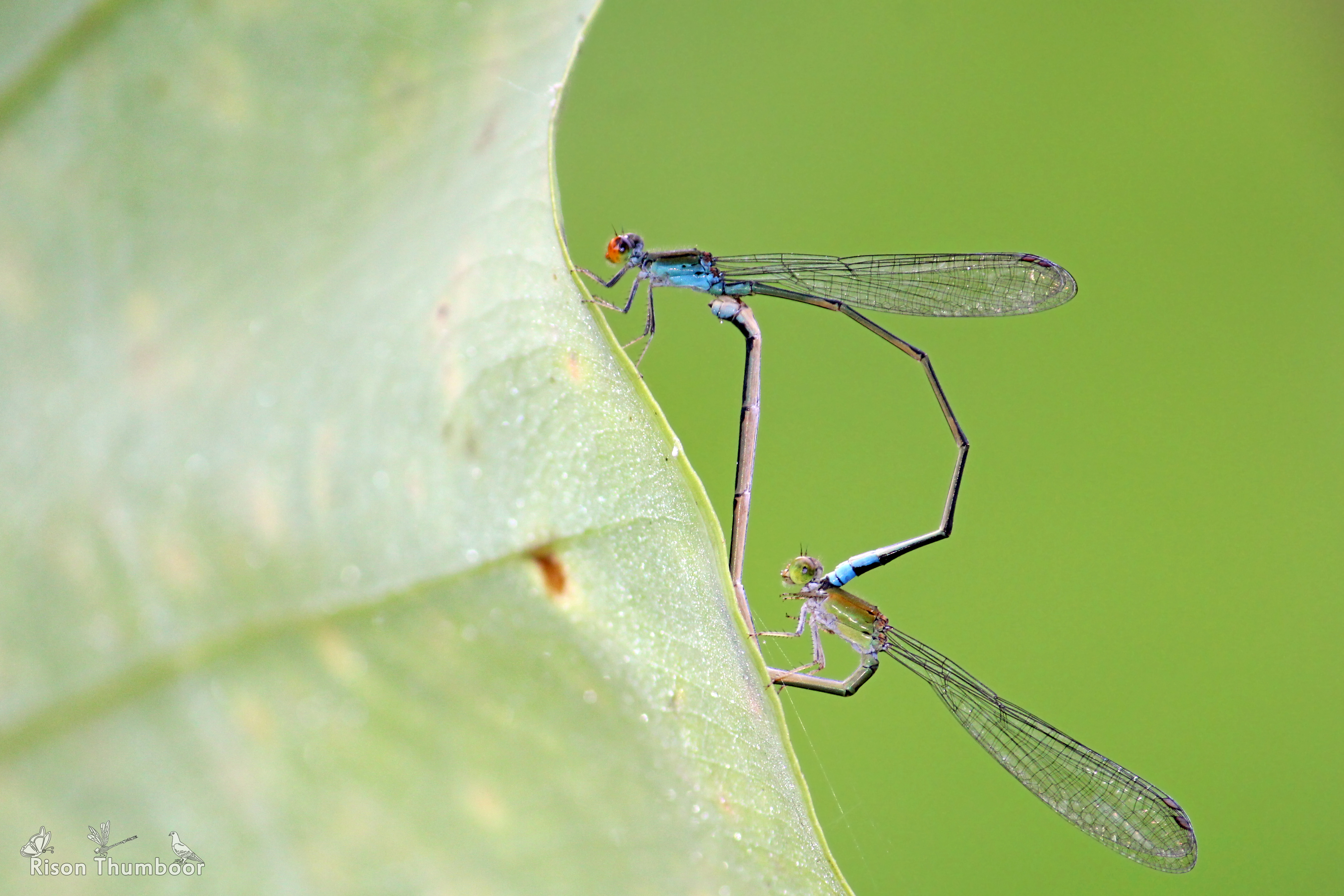
Mating

== Suborder: Anisoptera (Dragonflies) ==
There are 37 species of dragonfly found in the state.

=== Family: Aeshnidae ===
==== Species: Anaciaeschna jaspidea - rusty darner ====
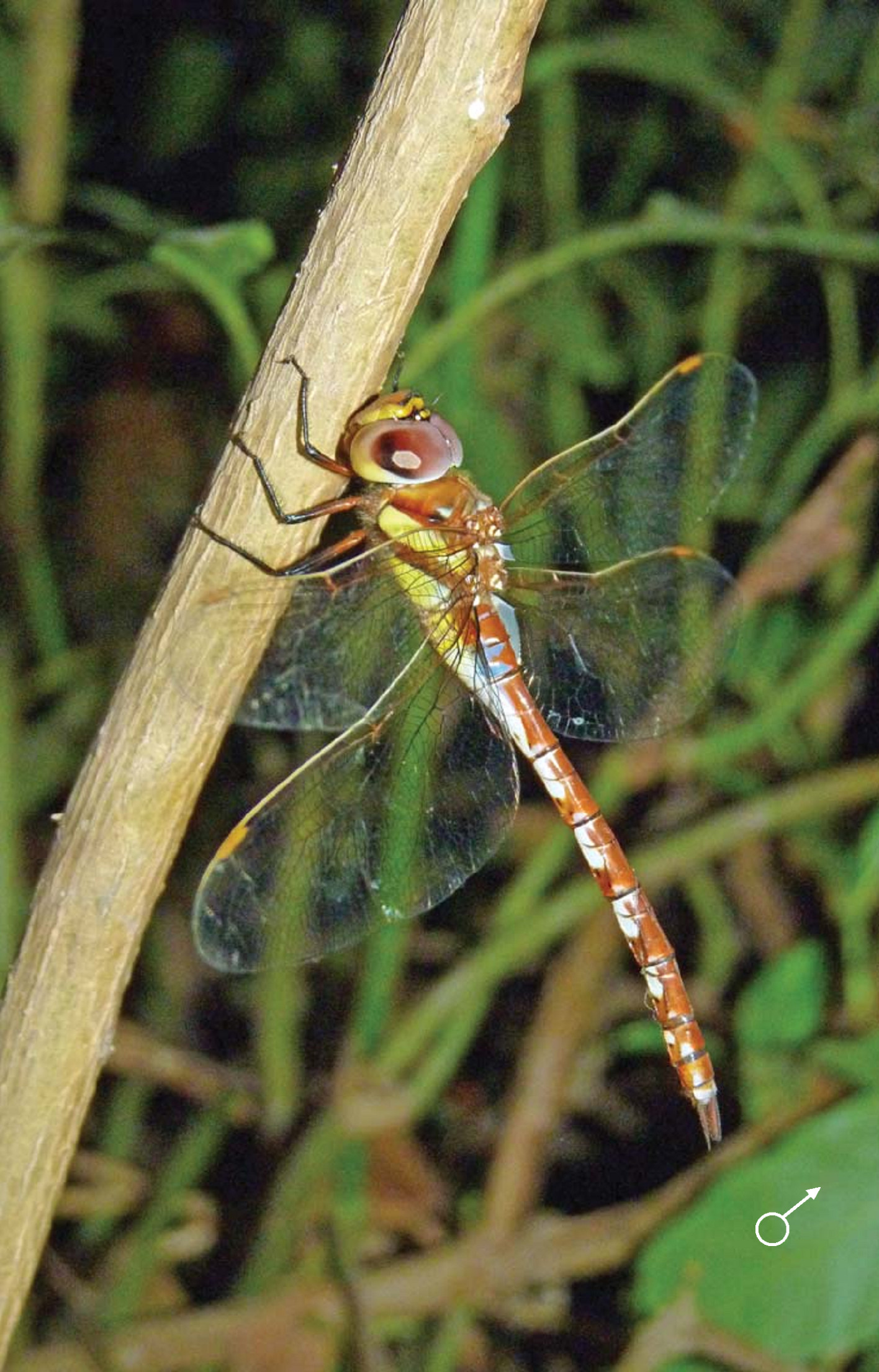
Male

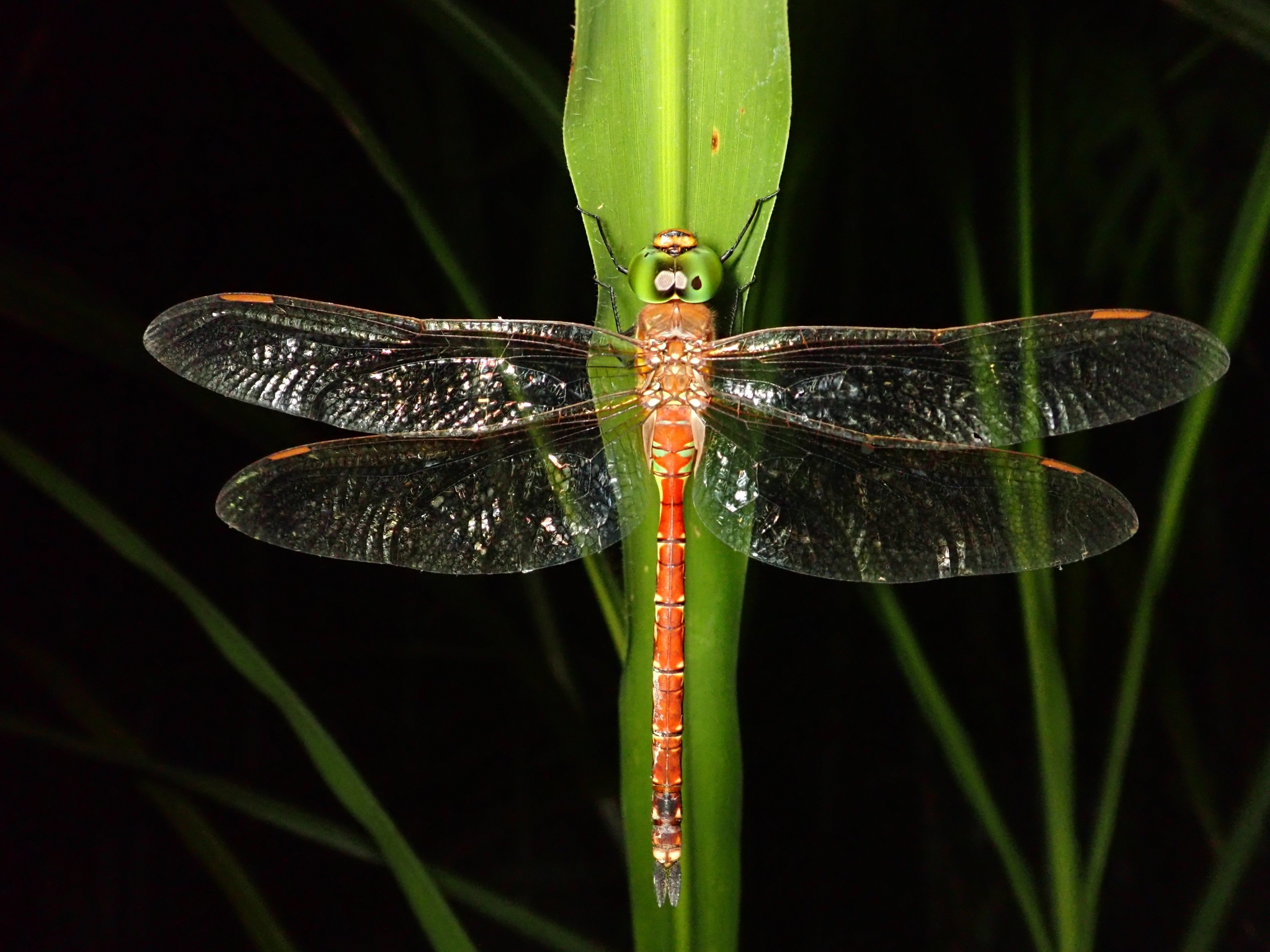
Female

==== Species: Anax ephippiger - vagrant emperor ====
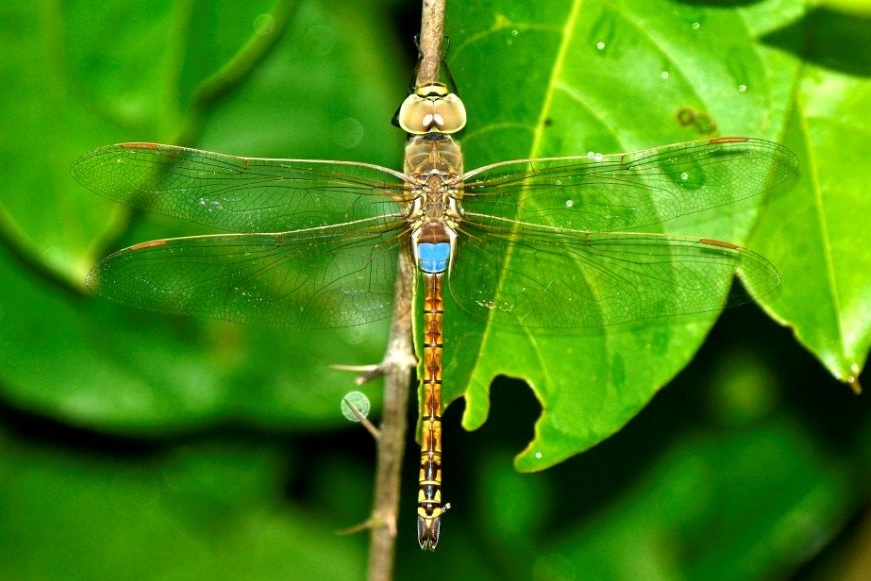
Male

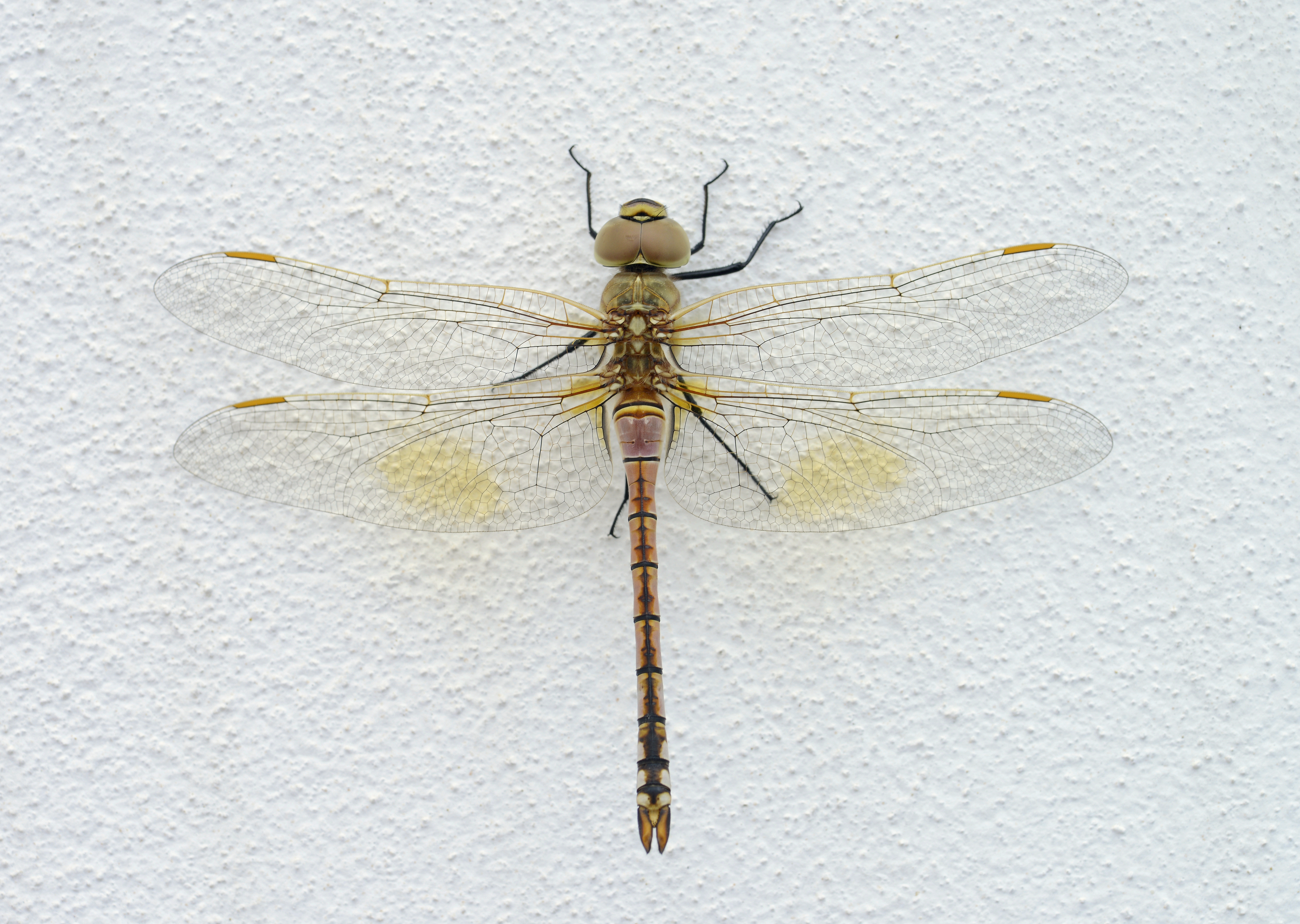
Female

==== Species: Anax immaculifrons - fiery emperor ====
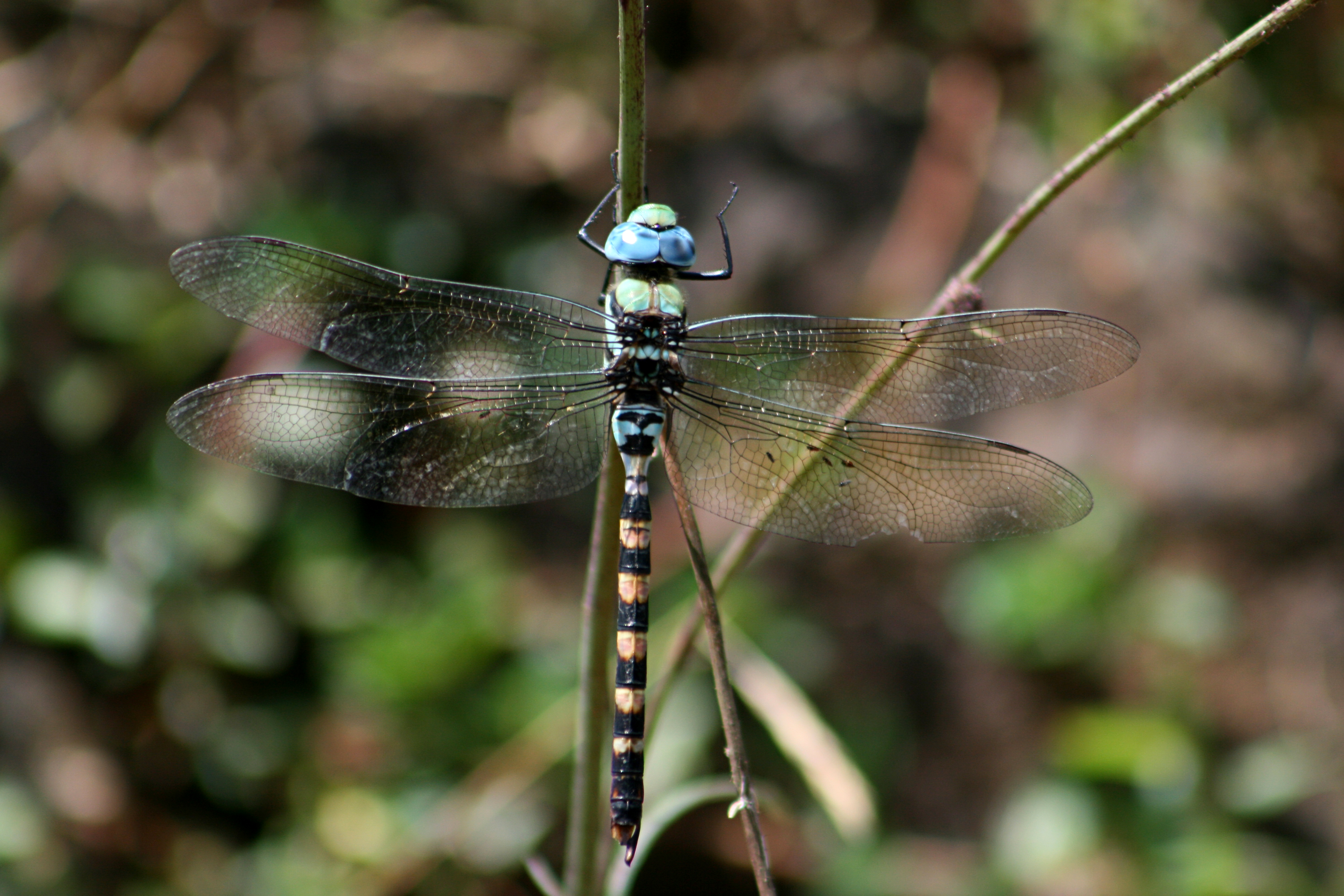
Male

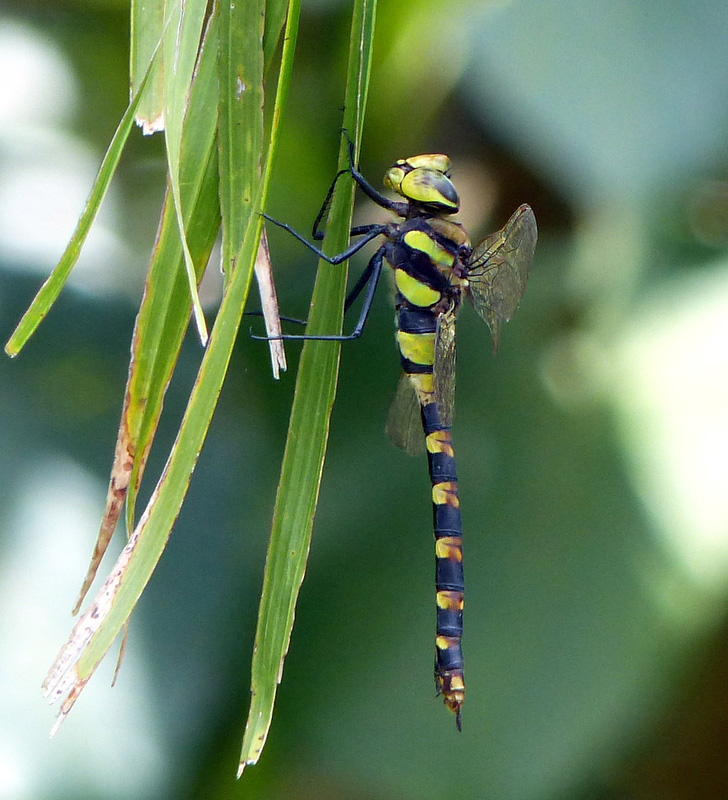
Female

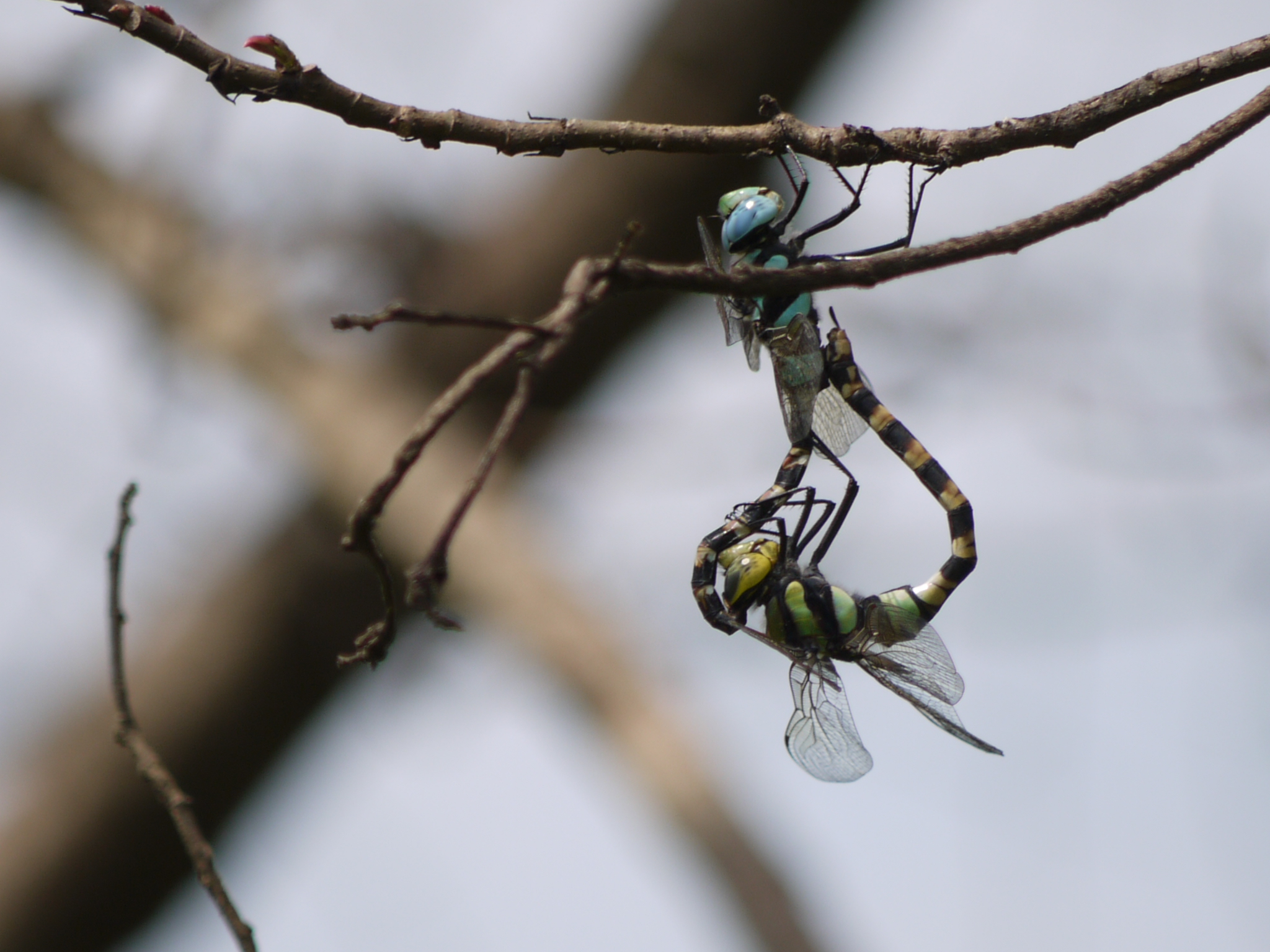
Mating

==== Species: Anax indicus - elephant emperor ====
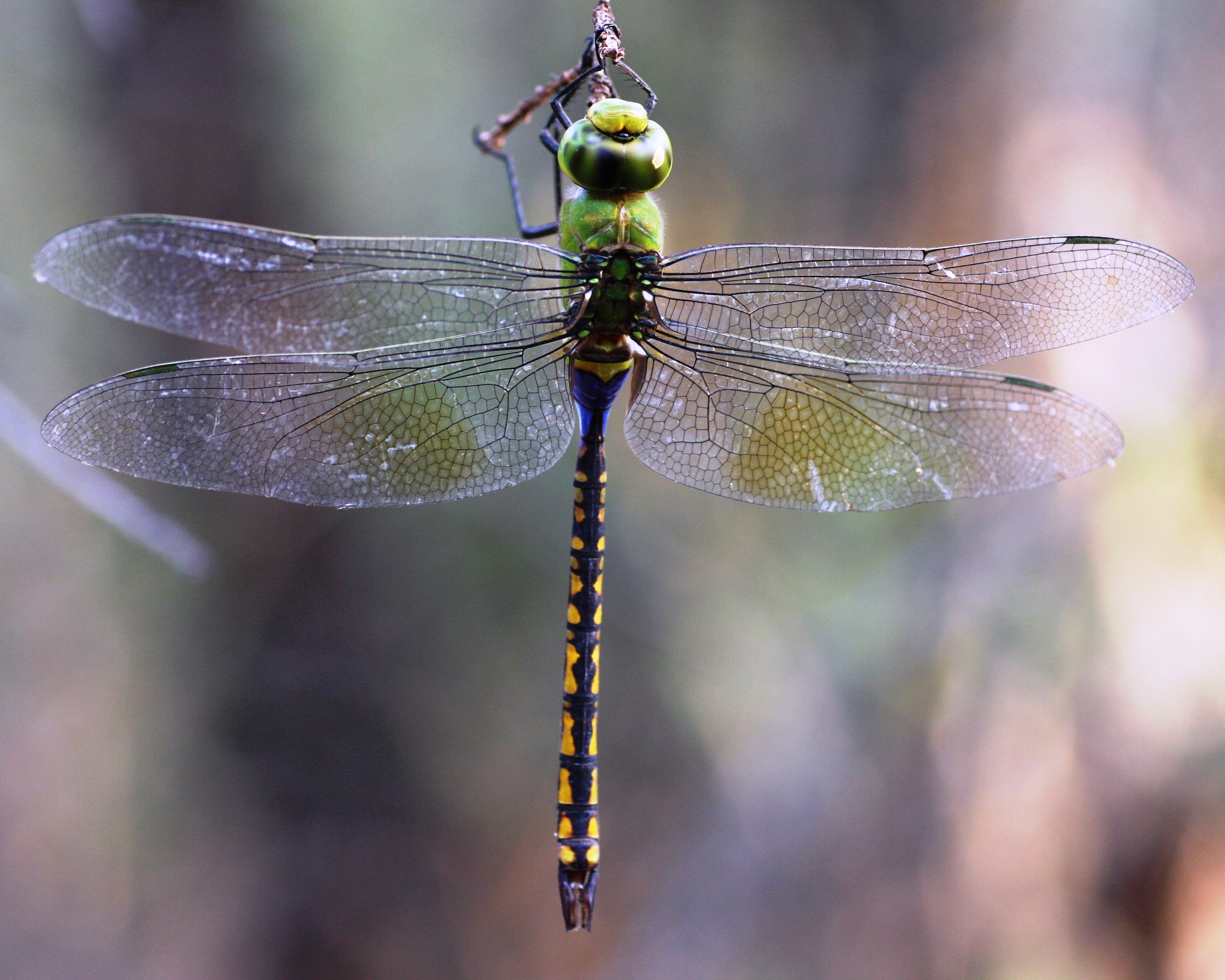
Male

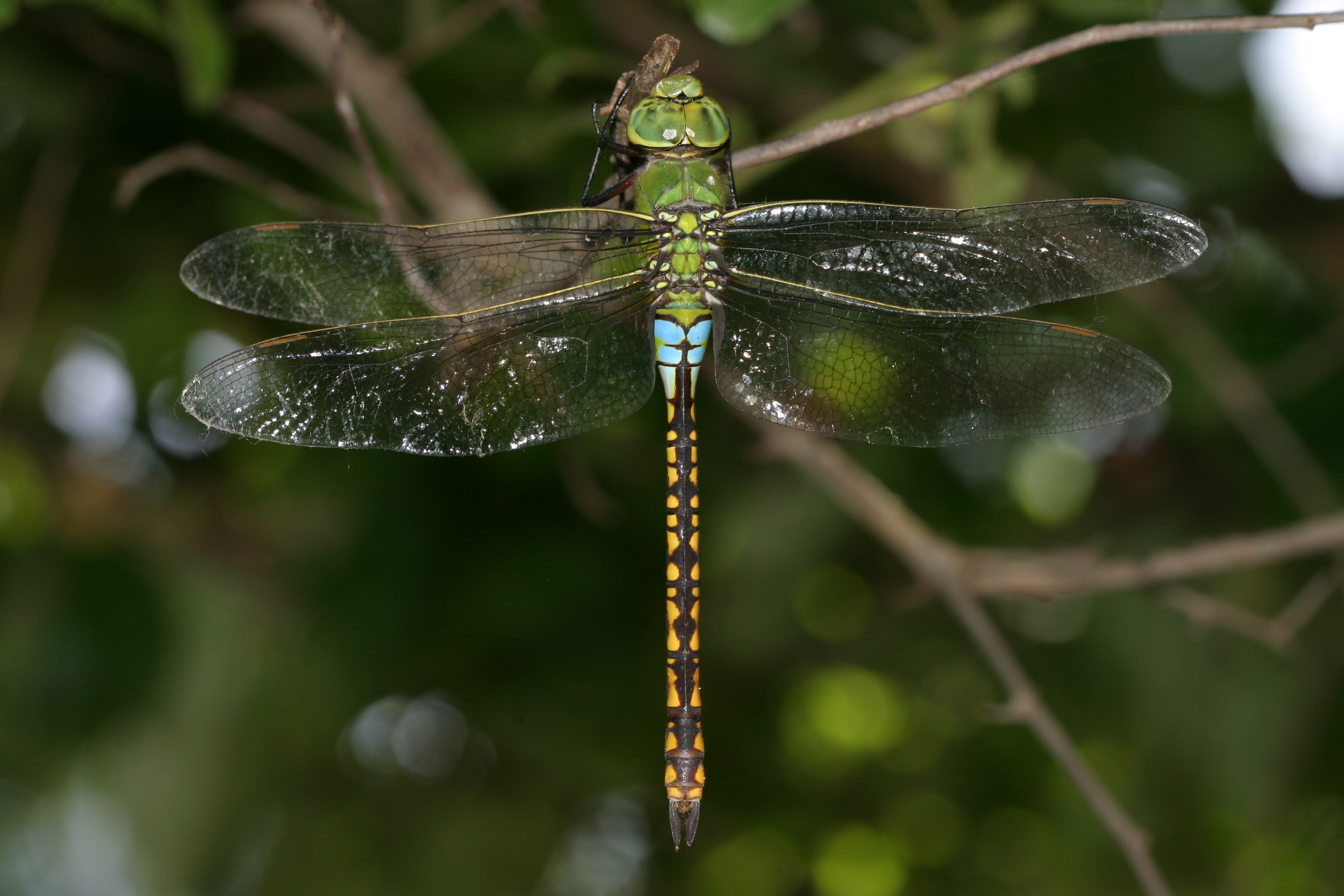
Female

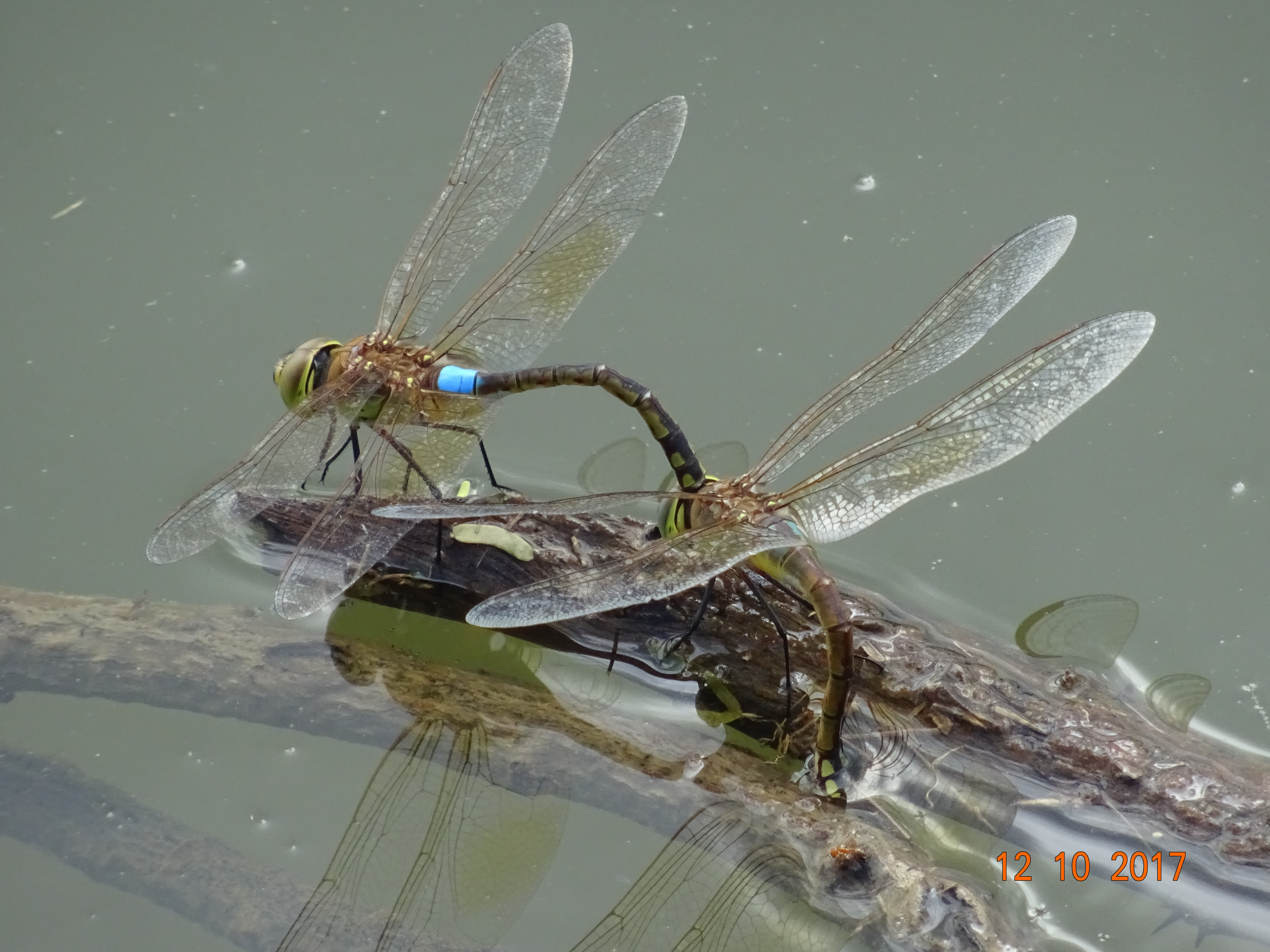
Mating

==== Species: Anax parthenope - lesser emperor ====
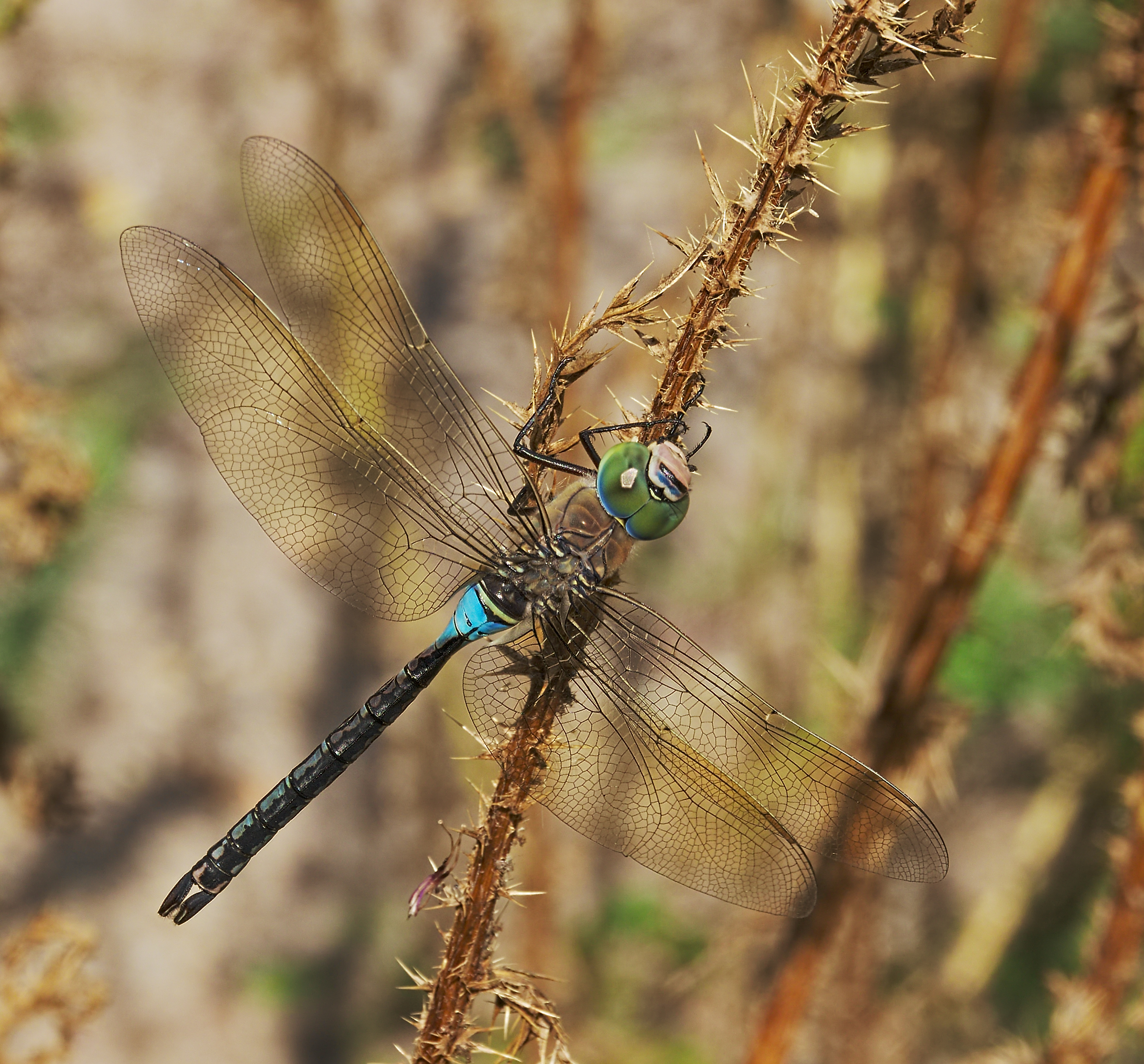
Male

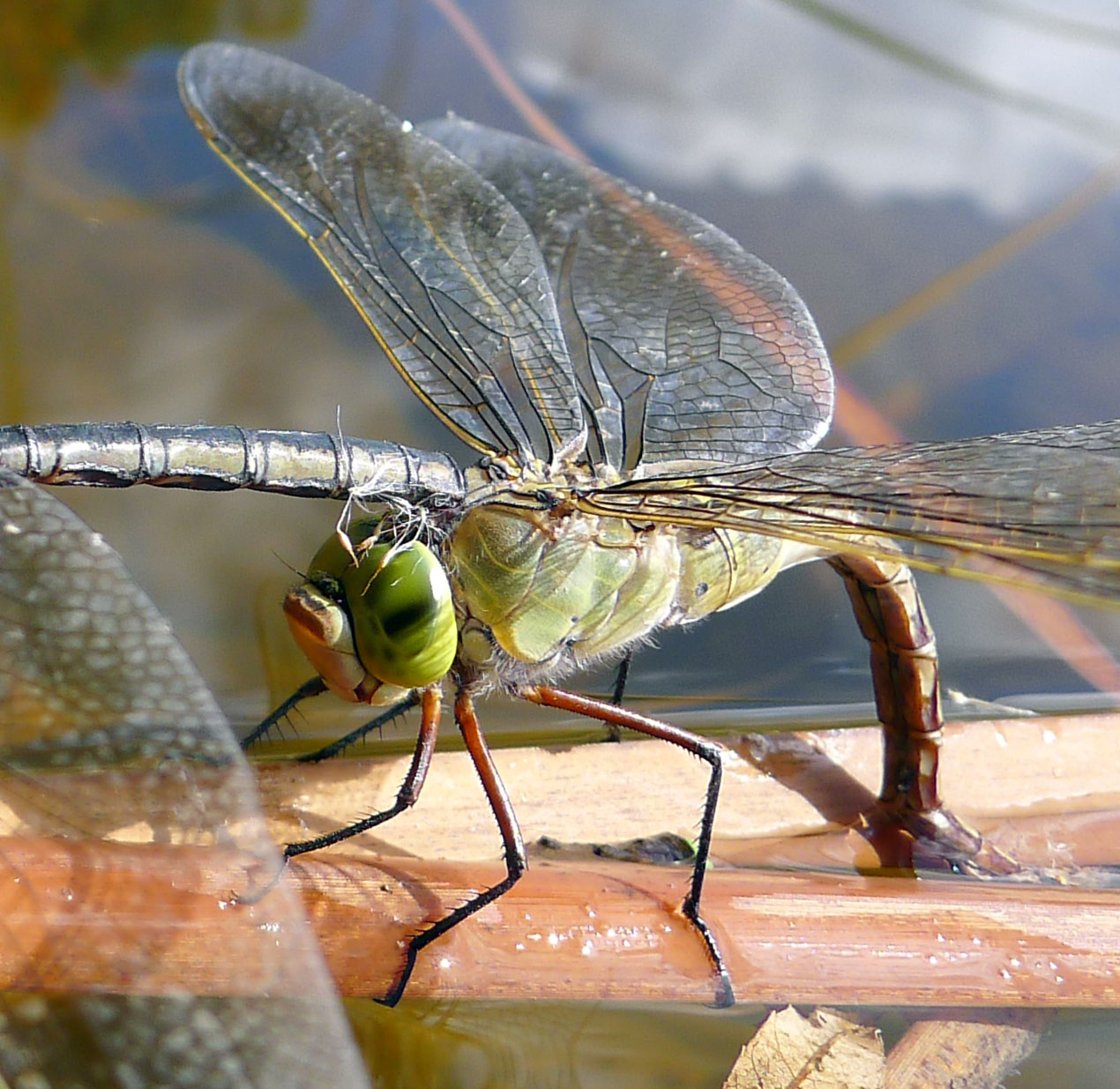
Female

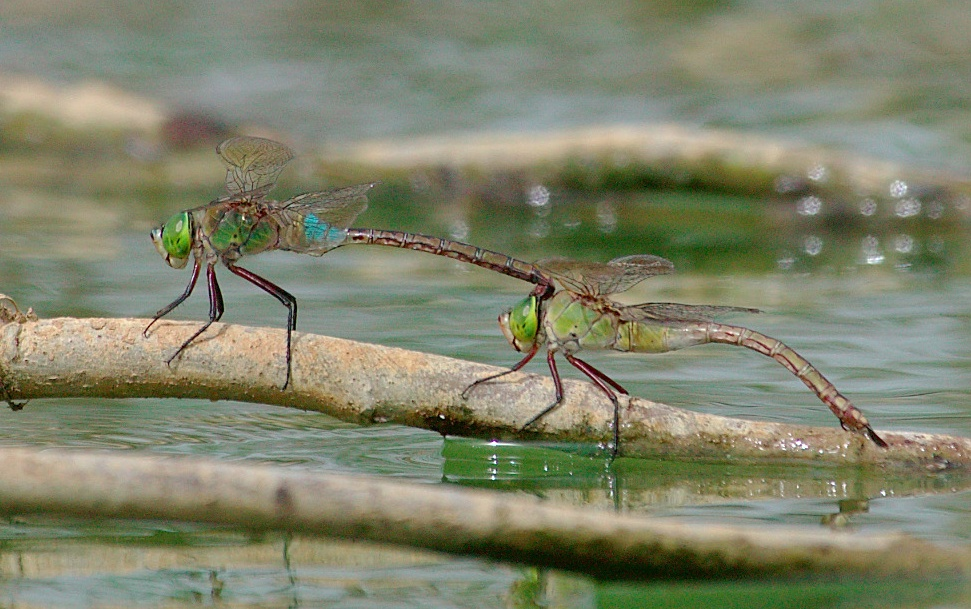
Mating

==== Species: Gynacantha millardi - parakeet darner ====
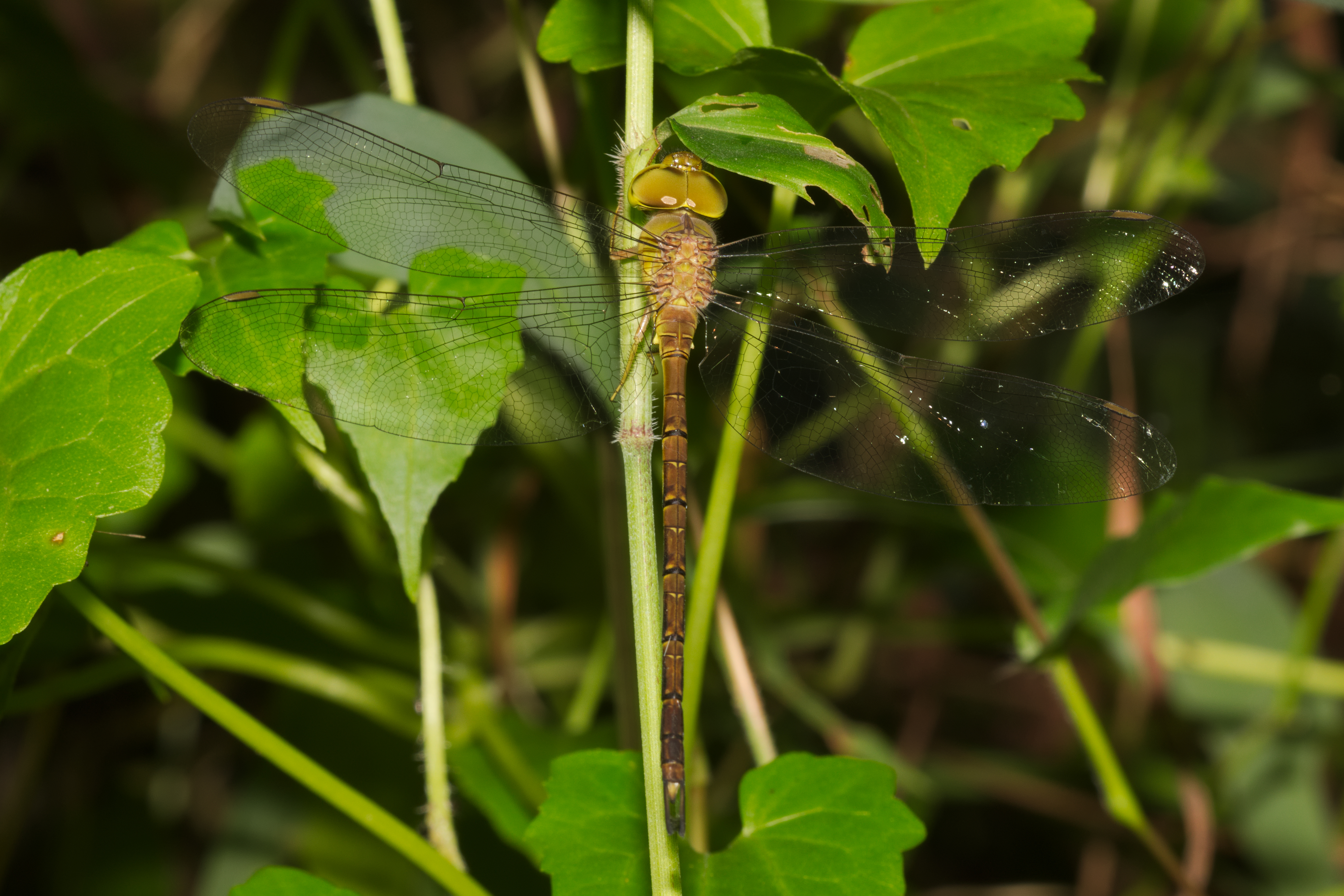
Male

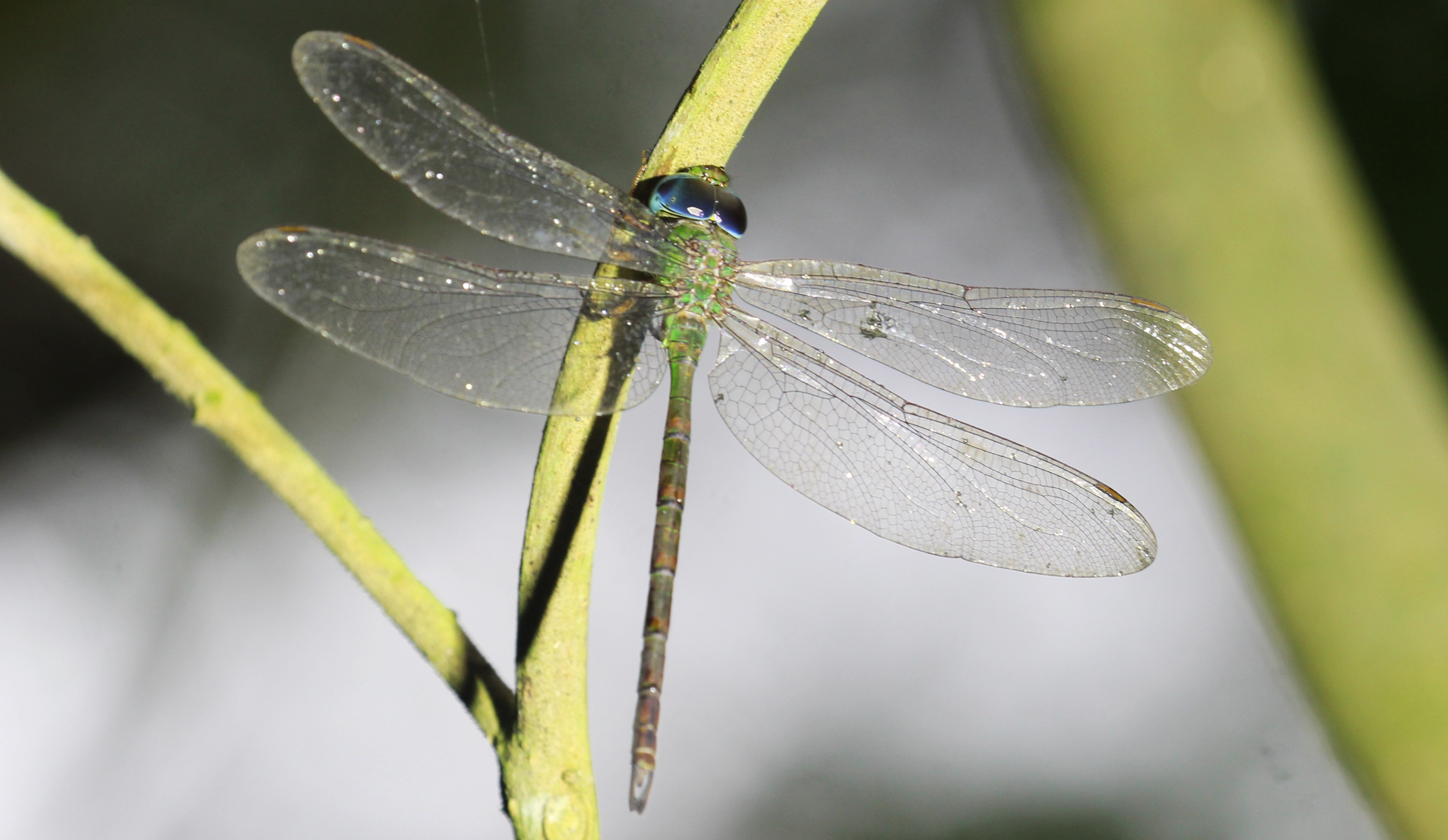
Female

=== Family: Gomphidae ===
==== Species: Ictinogomphus rapax - Indian common clubtail ====
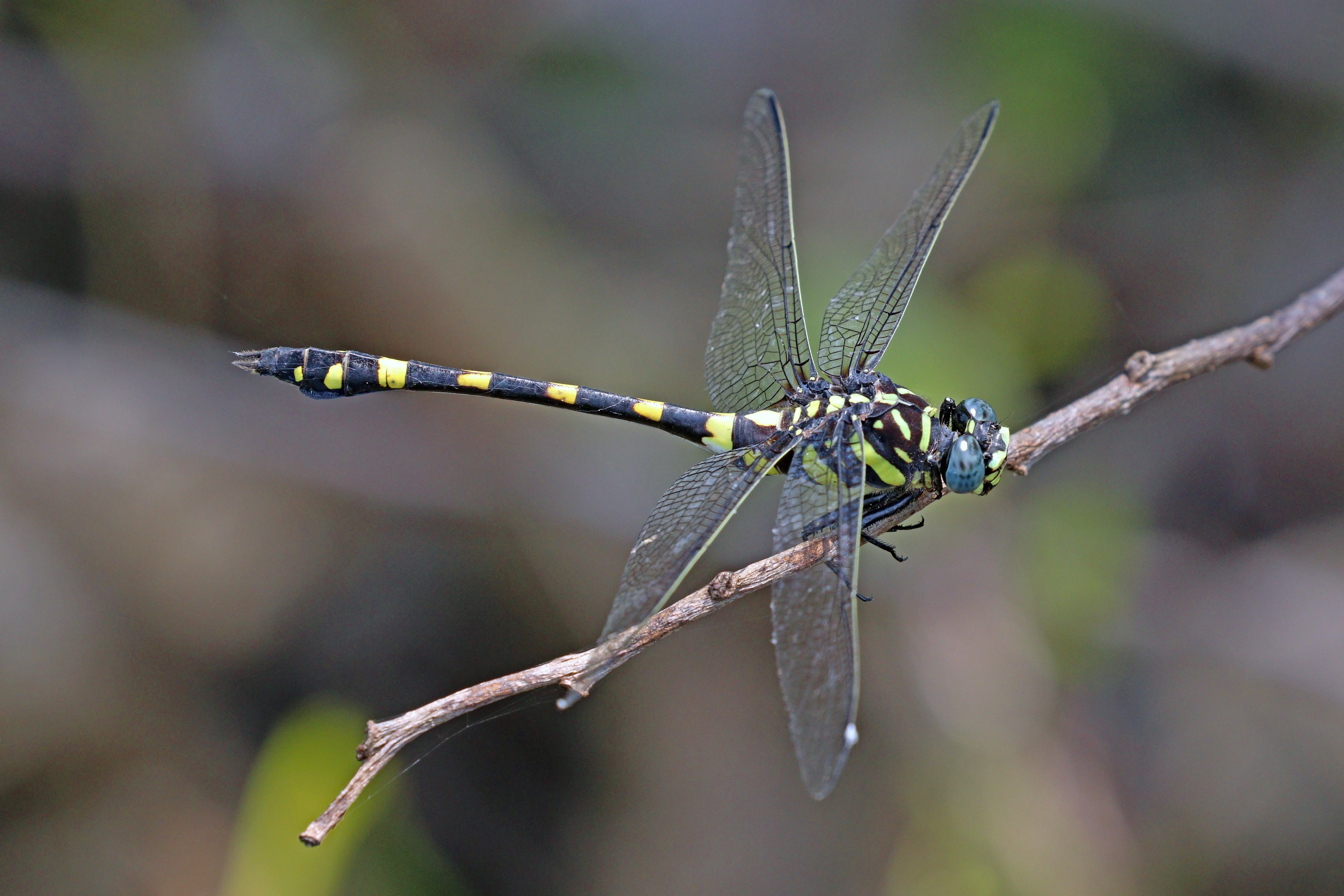
Male

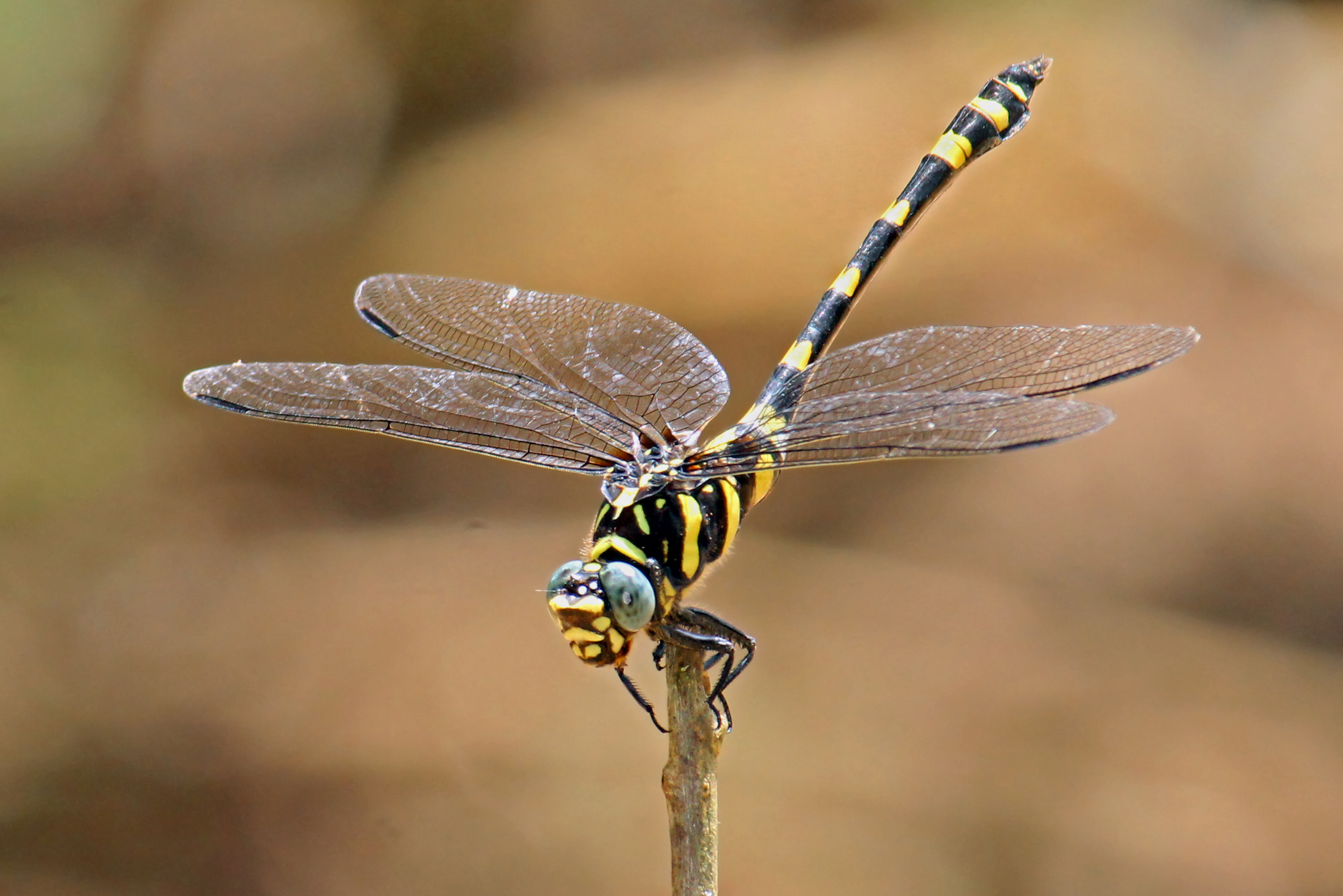
Female

==== Species: Paragomphus lineatus - lined hooktail ====
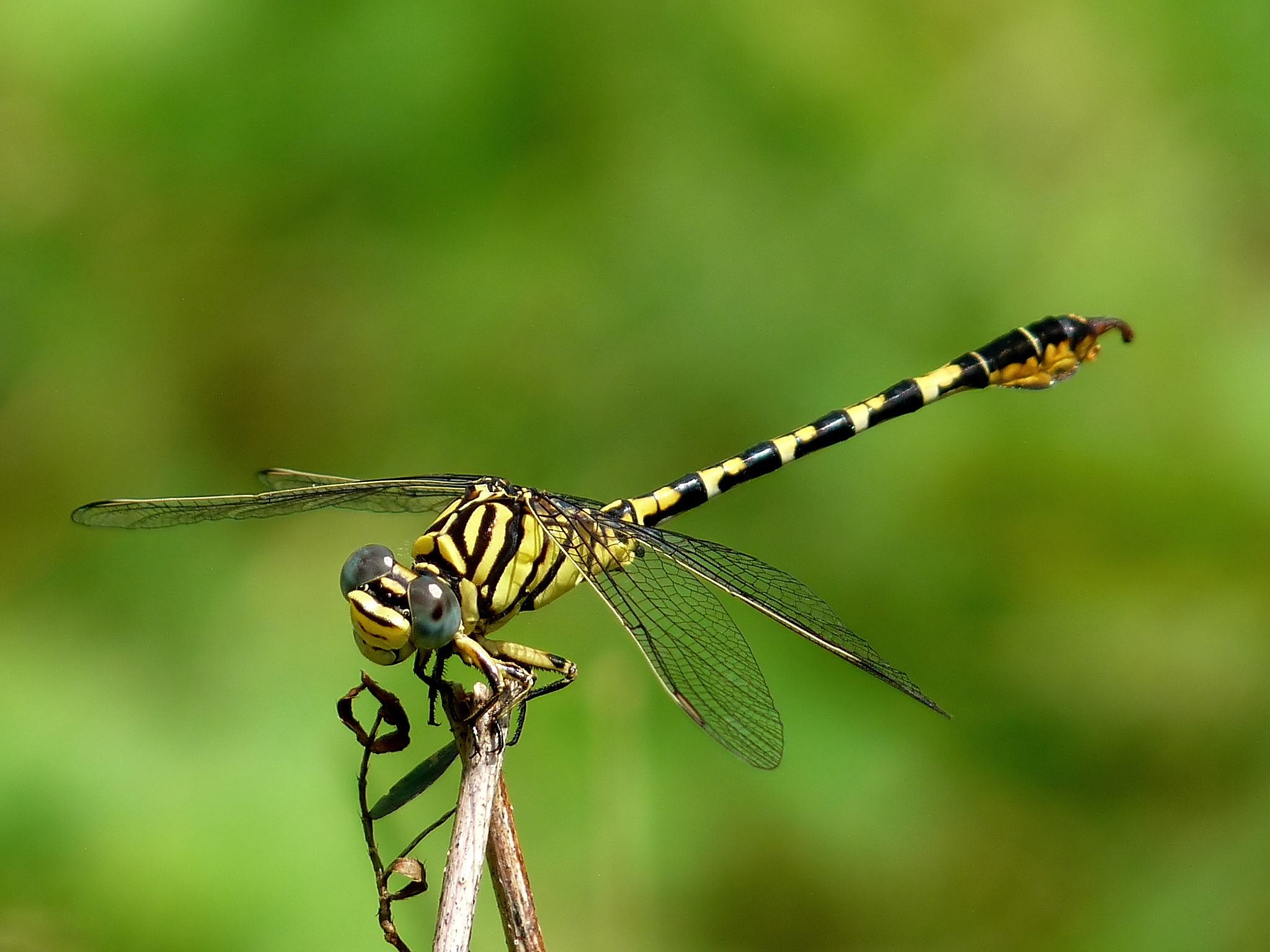
Male

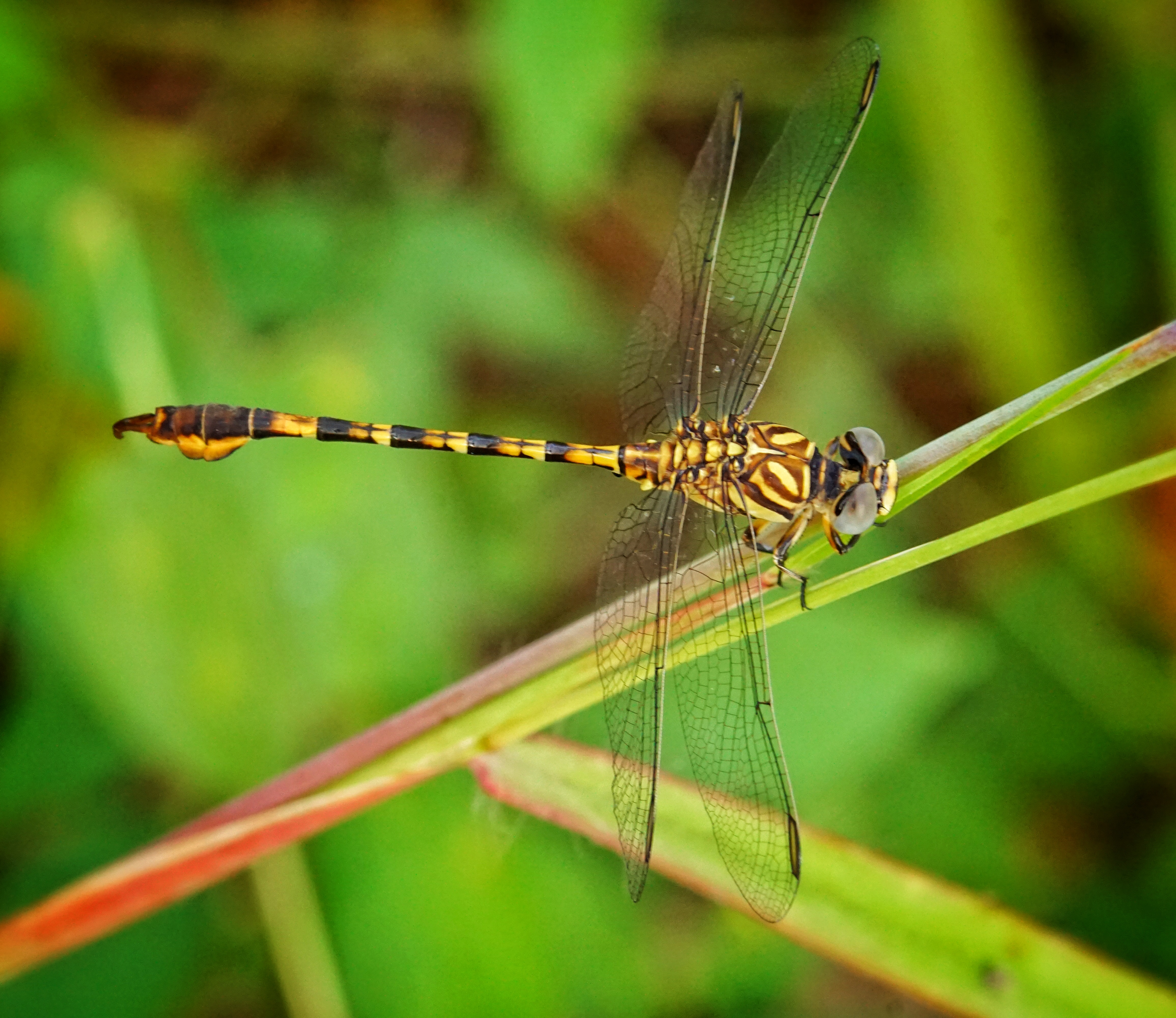
Female

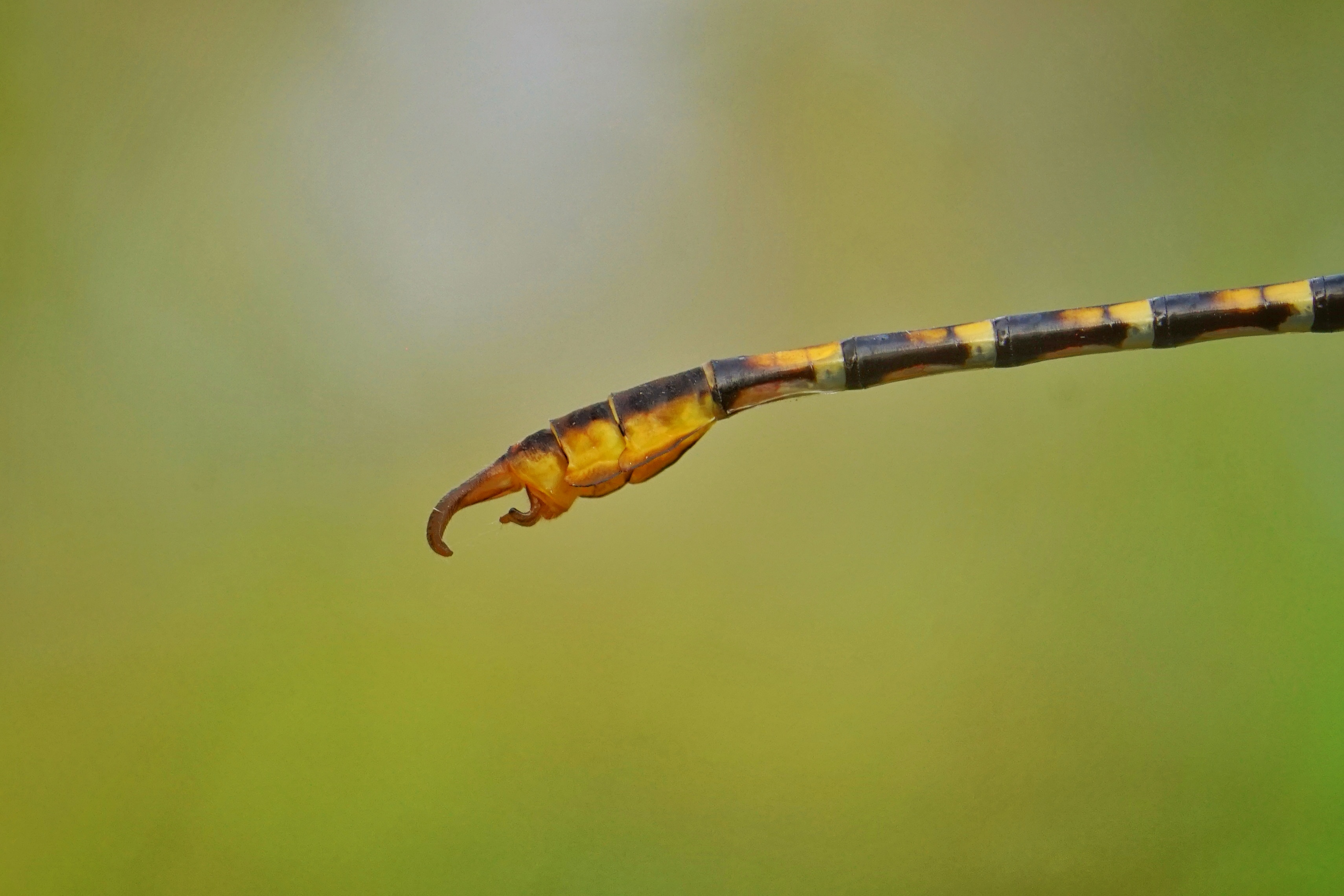
Anal appendages

=== Family: Macromiidae ===
==== Species: Epophthalmia vittata - common torrent hawk ====
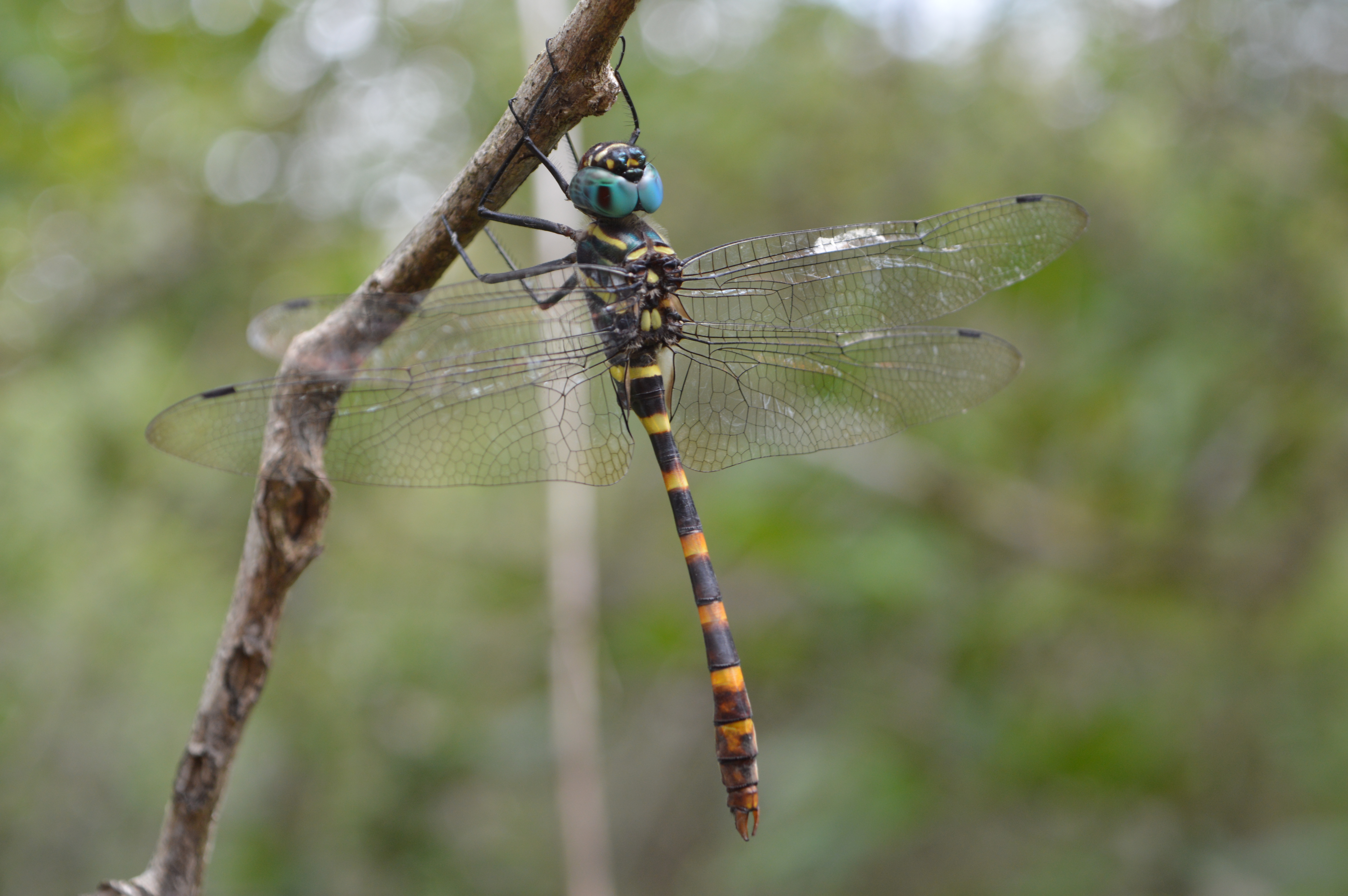
Male

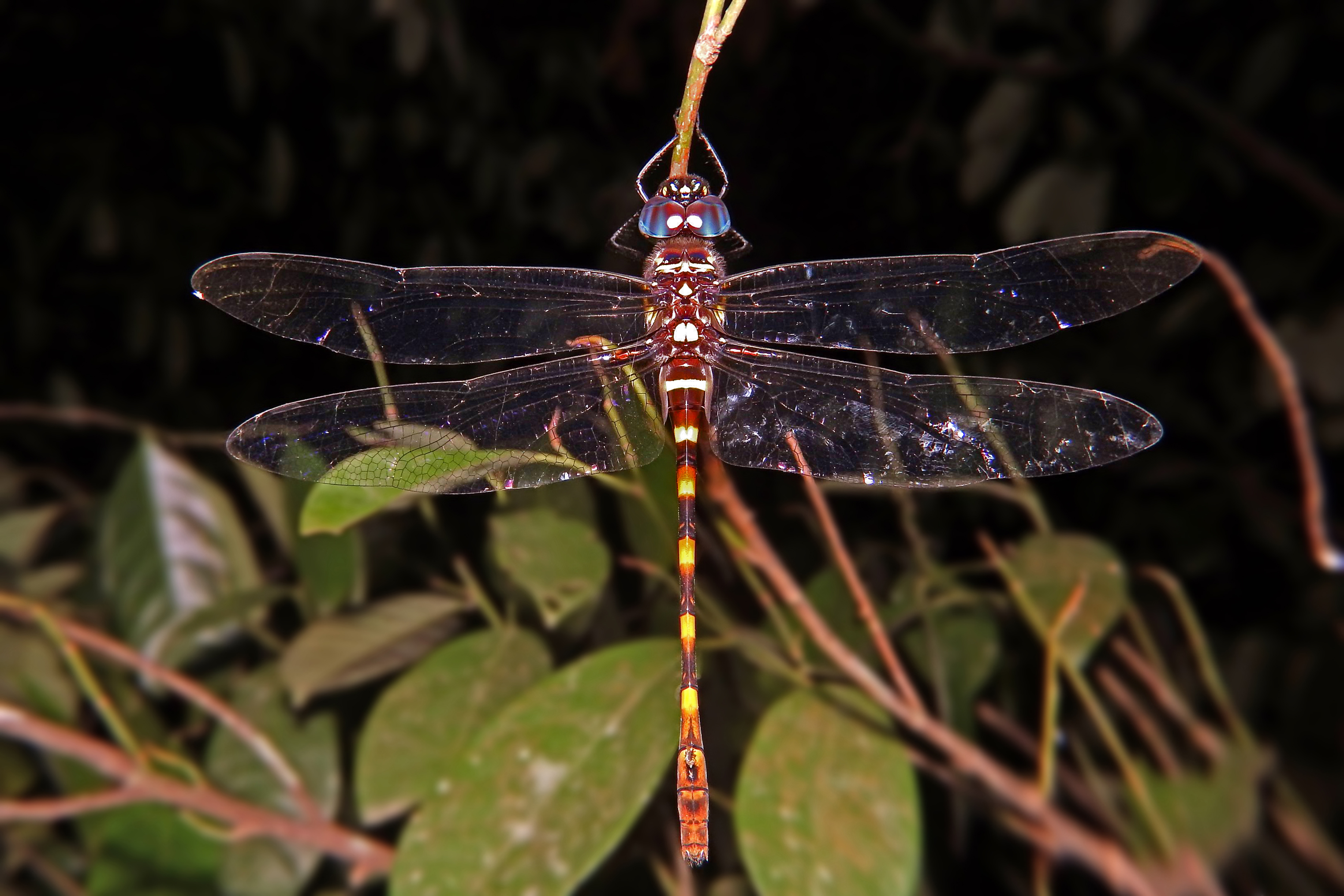
Female

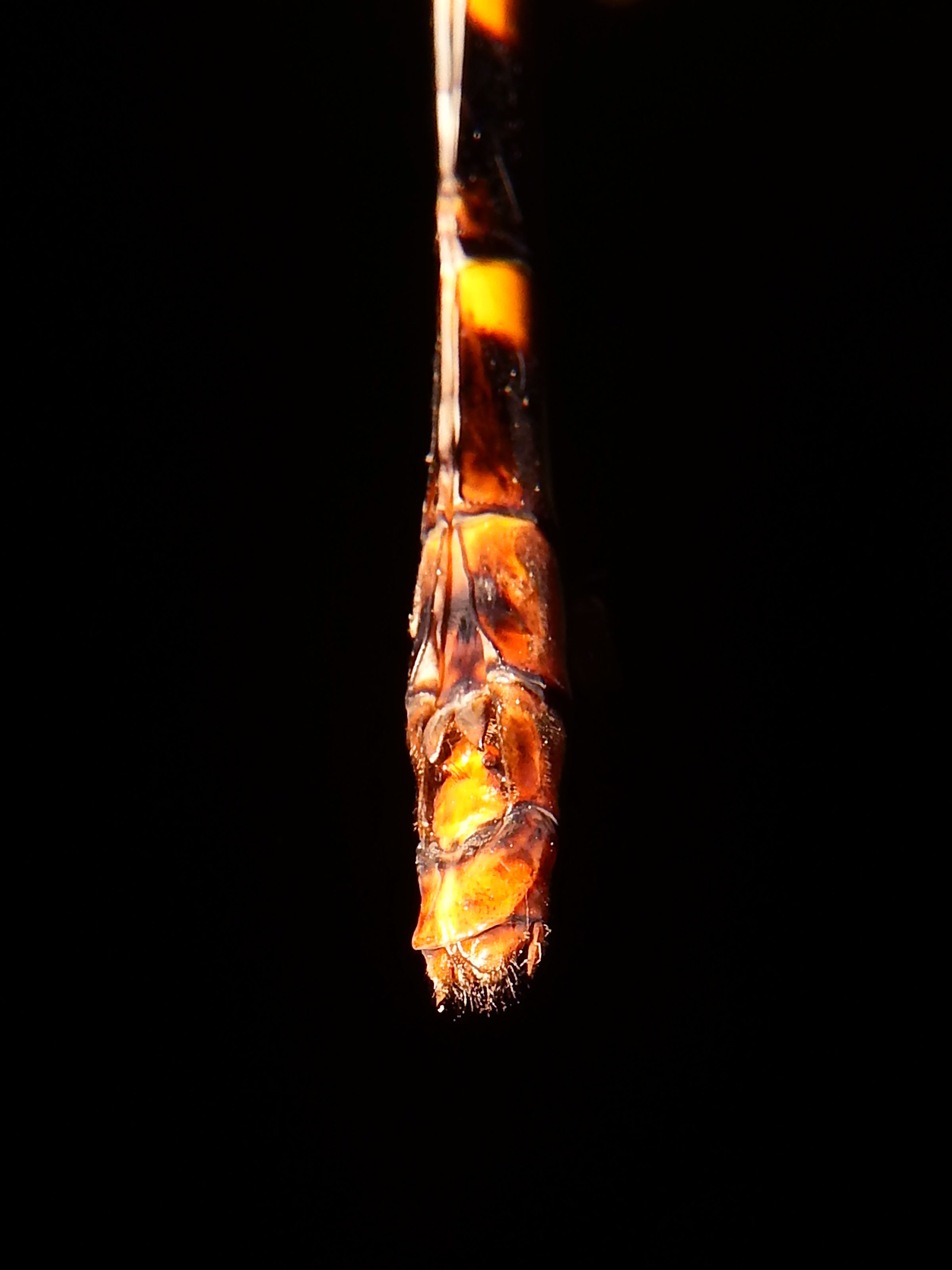
Anal appendages

=== Family: Libellulidae ===
==== Species: Acisoma panorpoides - grizzled pintail ====
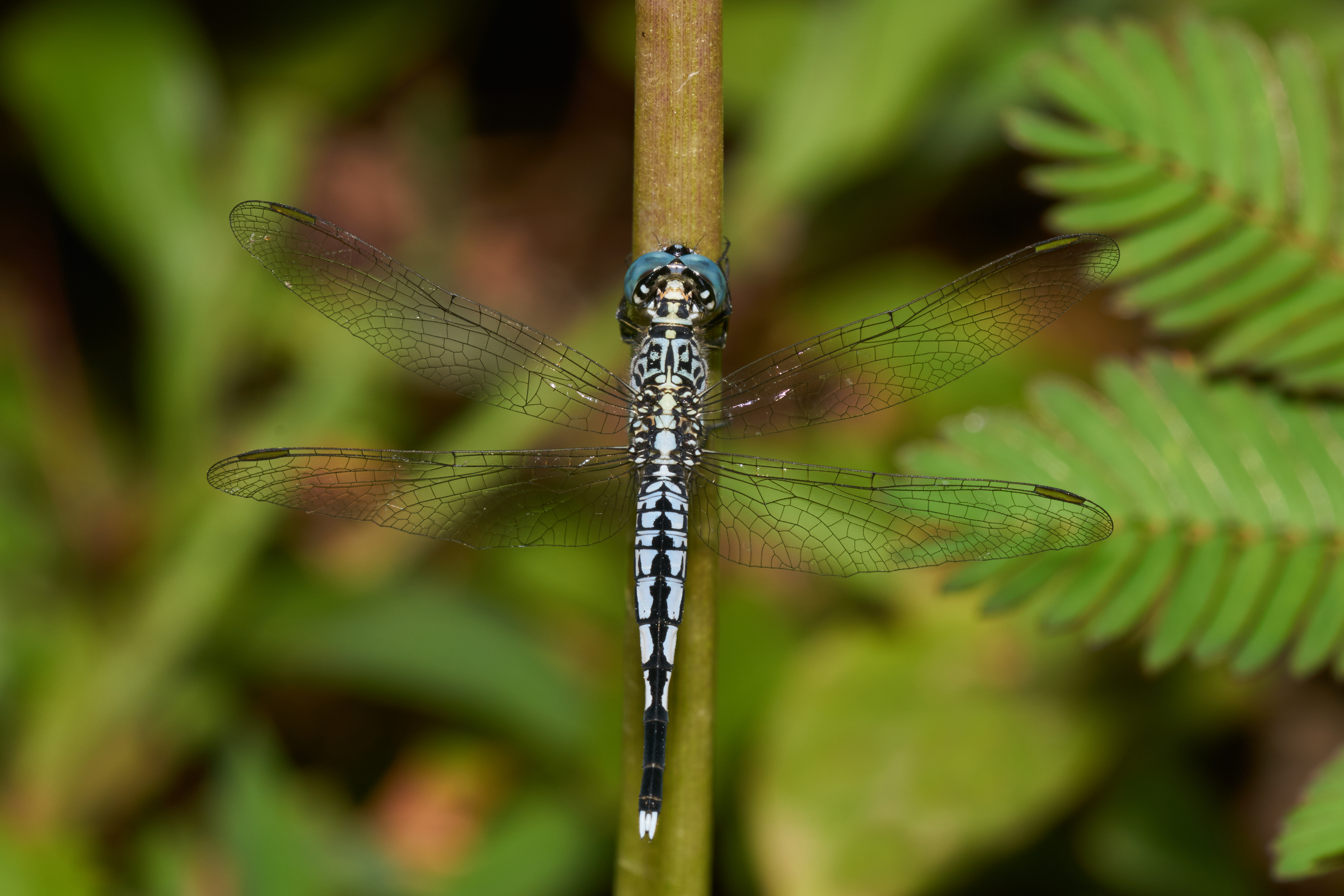
Male

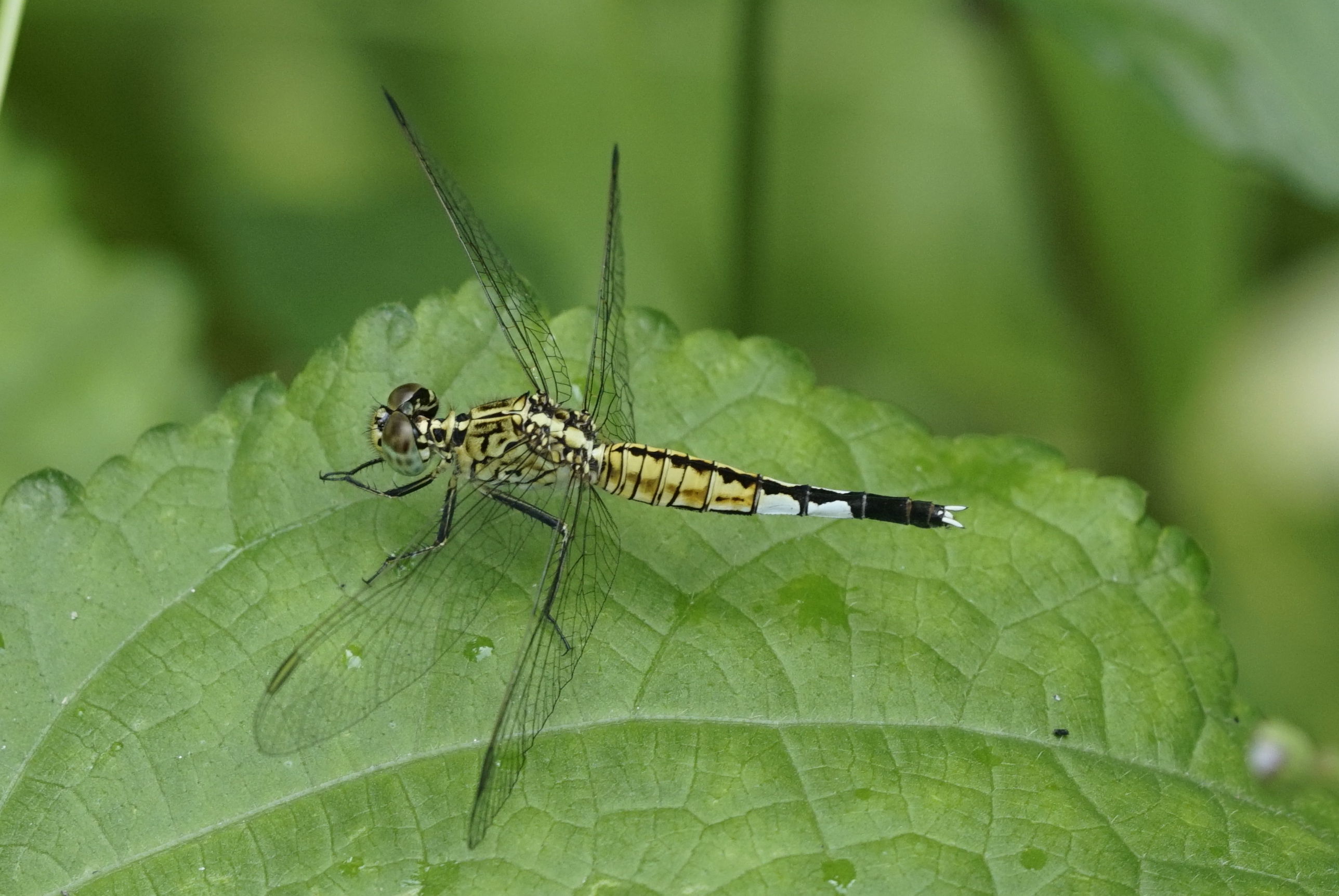
Female

==== Species: Brachydiplax sobrina ====
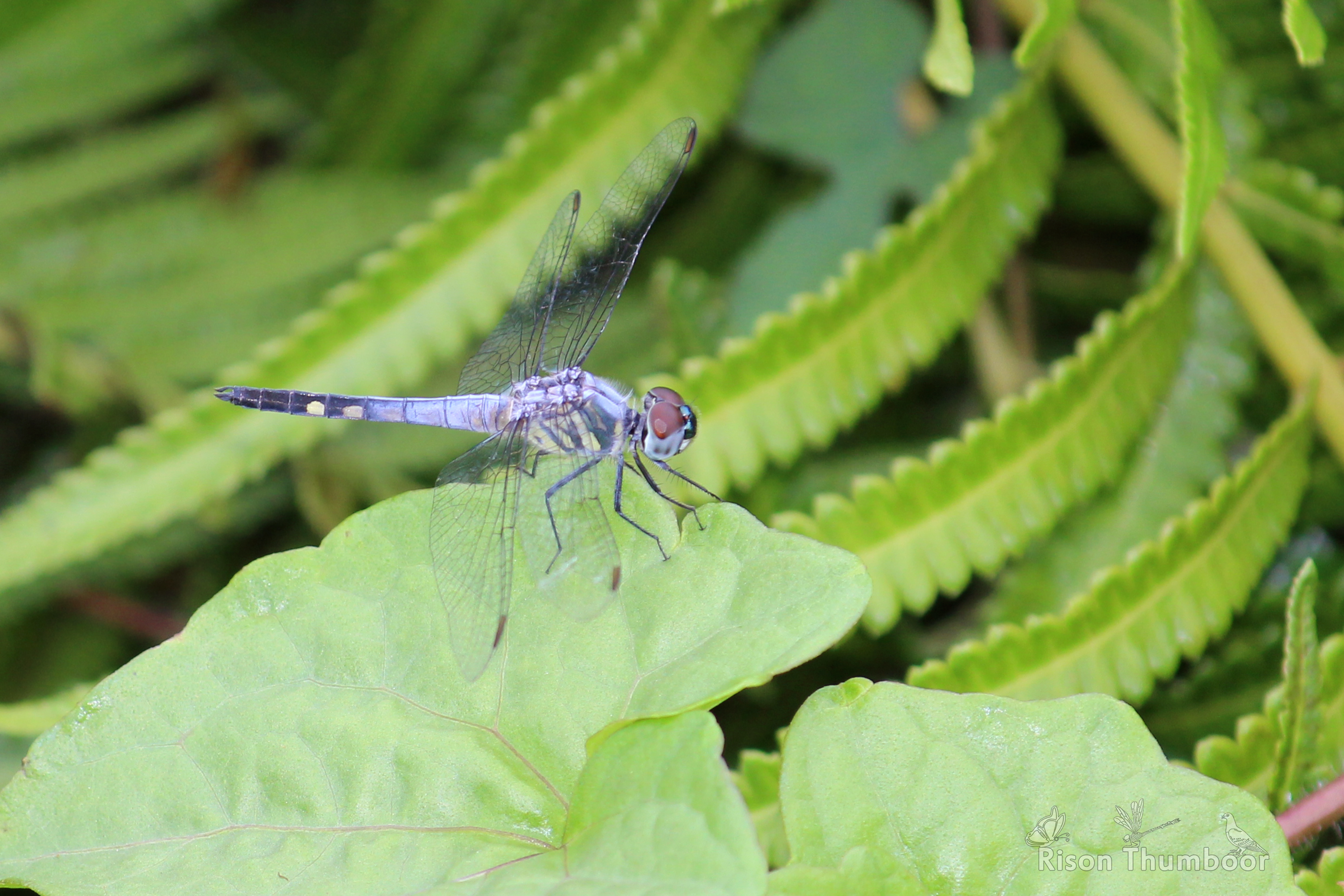
Male

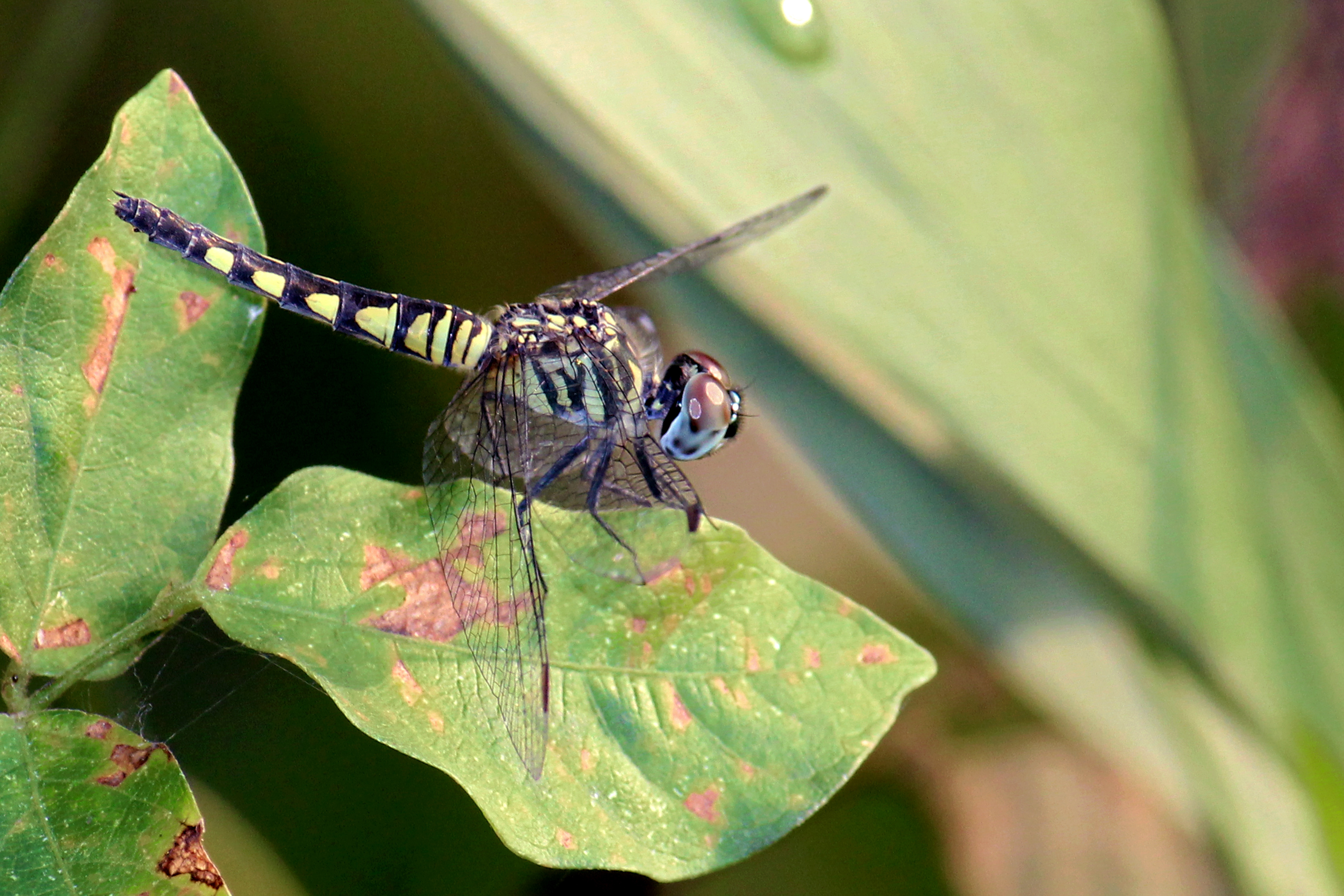
Female

==== Species: Brachythemis contaminata - ditch jewel ====
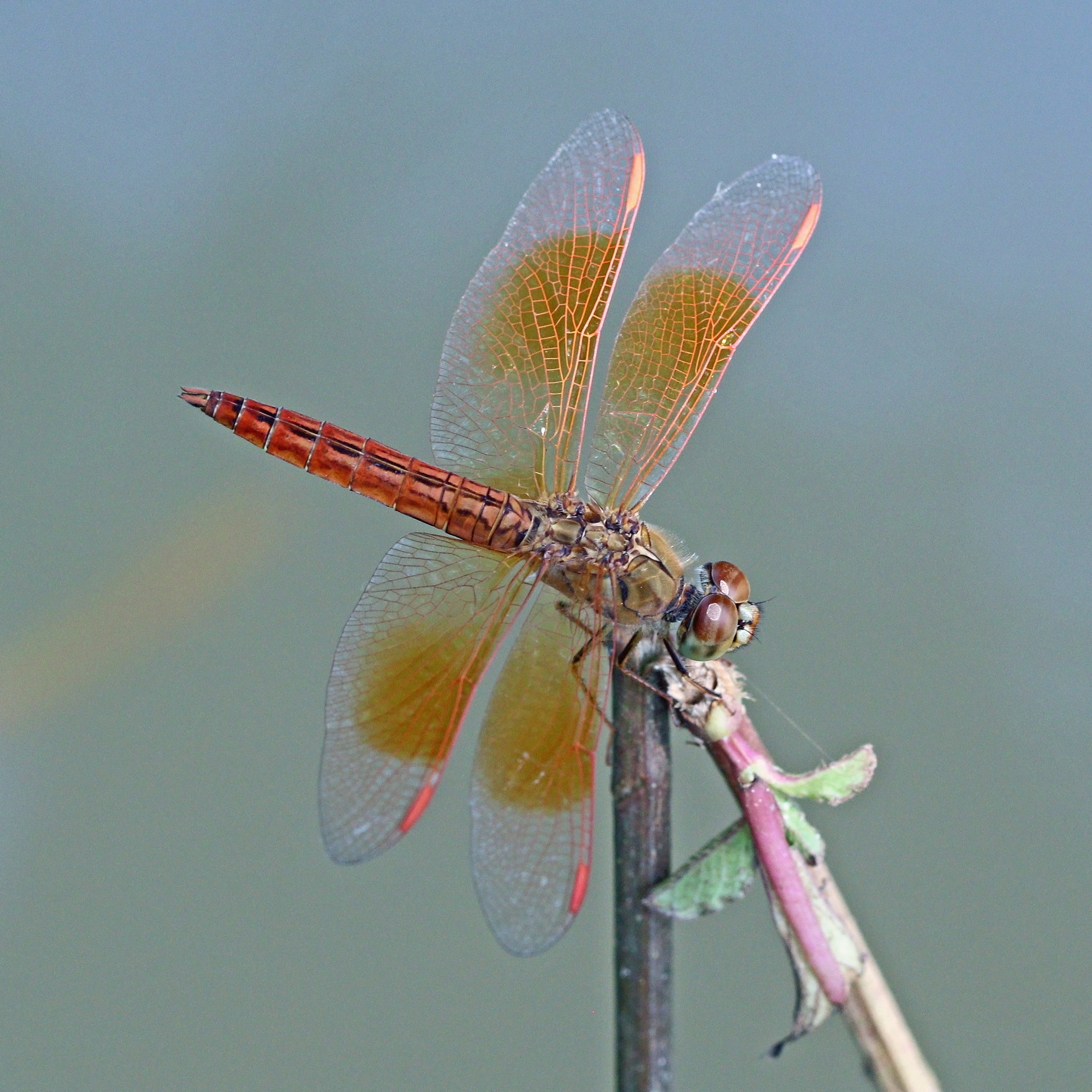
Male

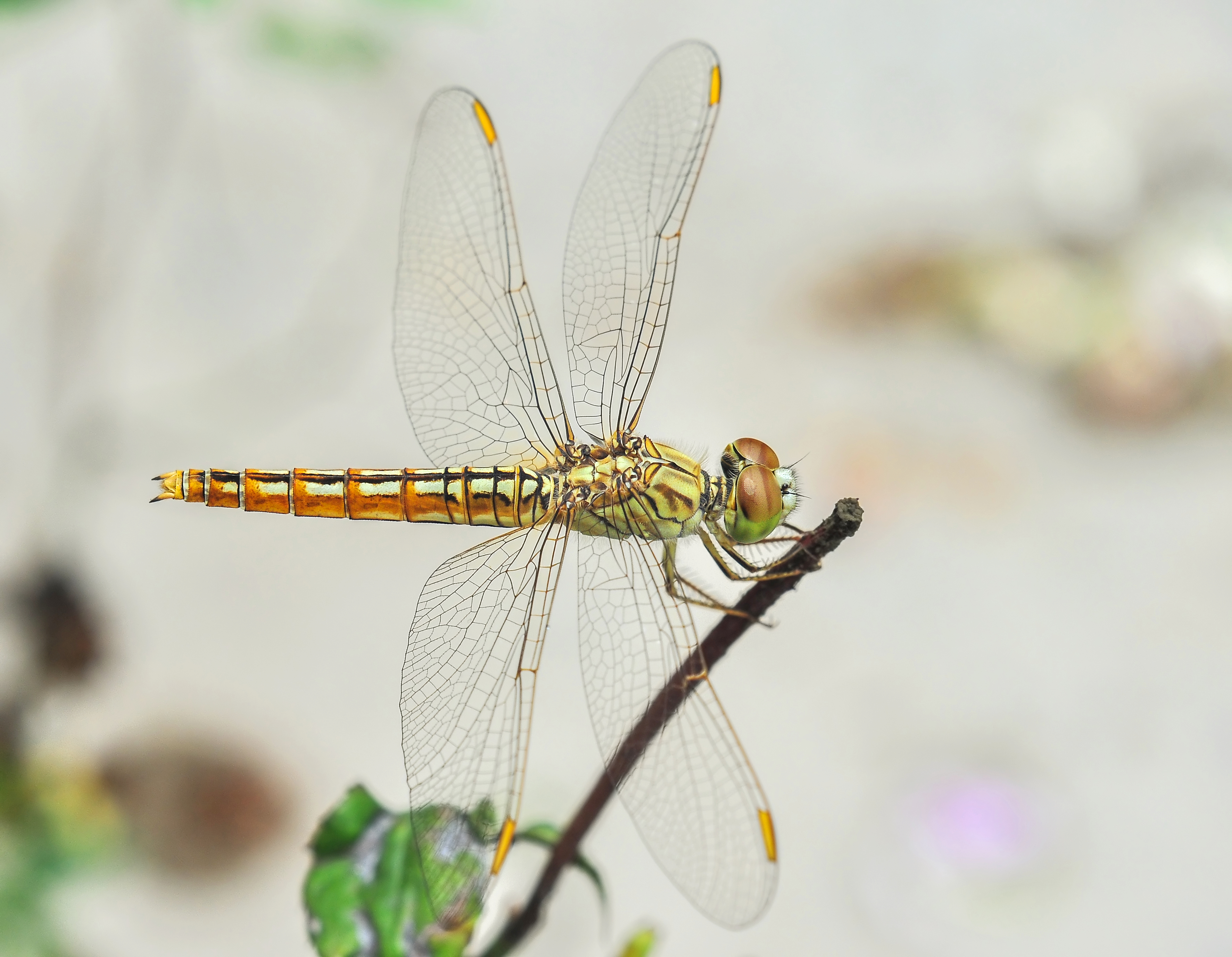
Female

==== Species: Bradinopyga geminata - granite ghost ====
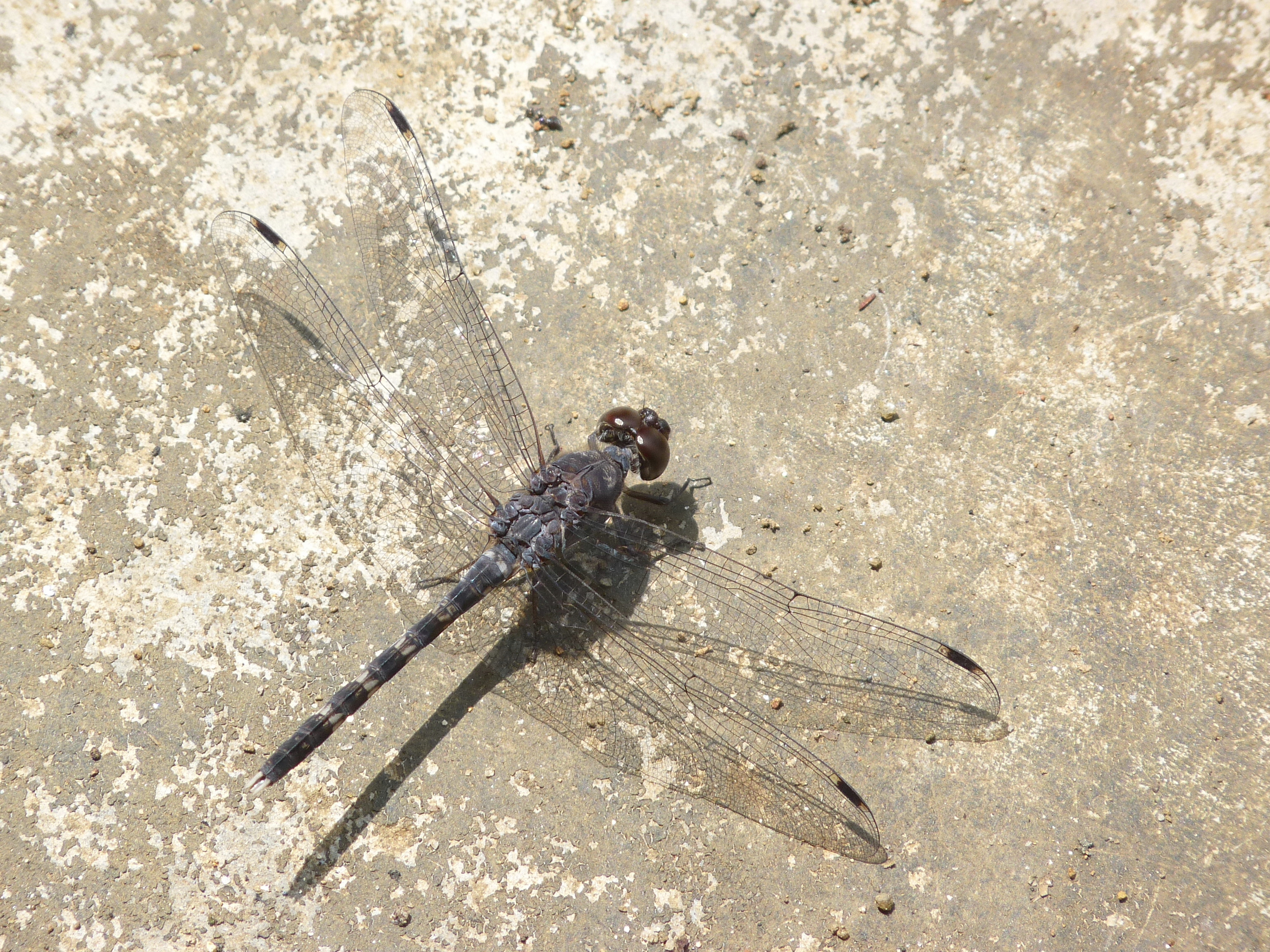
Male

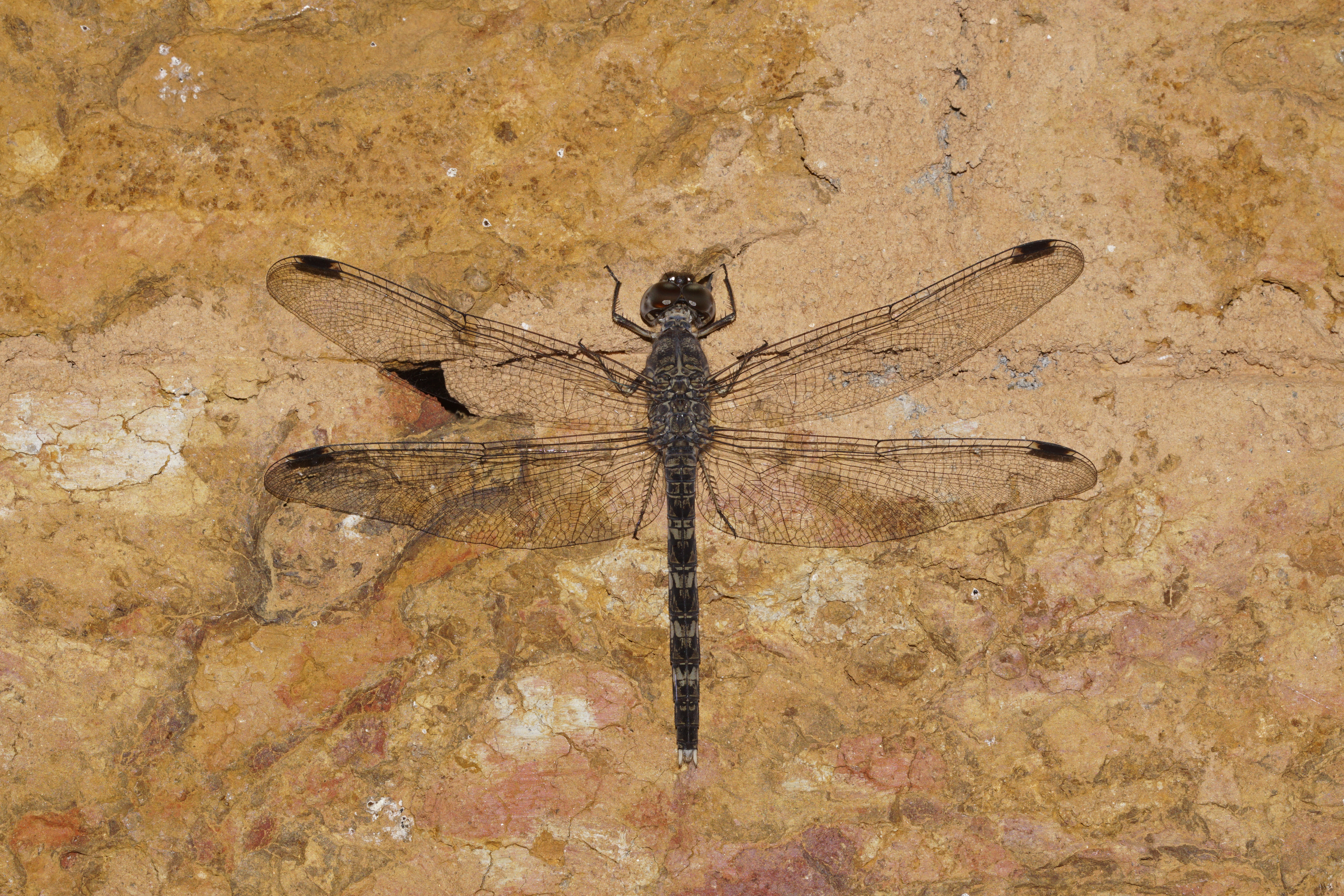
Female

==== Species: Crocothemis servilia - scarlet skimmer ====
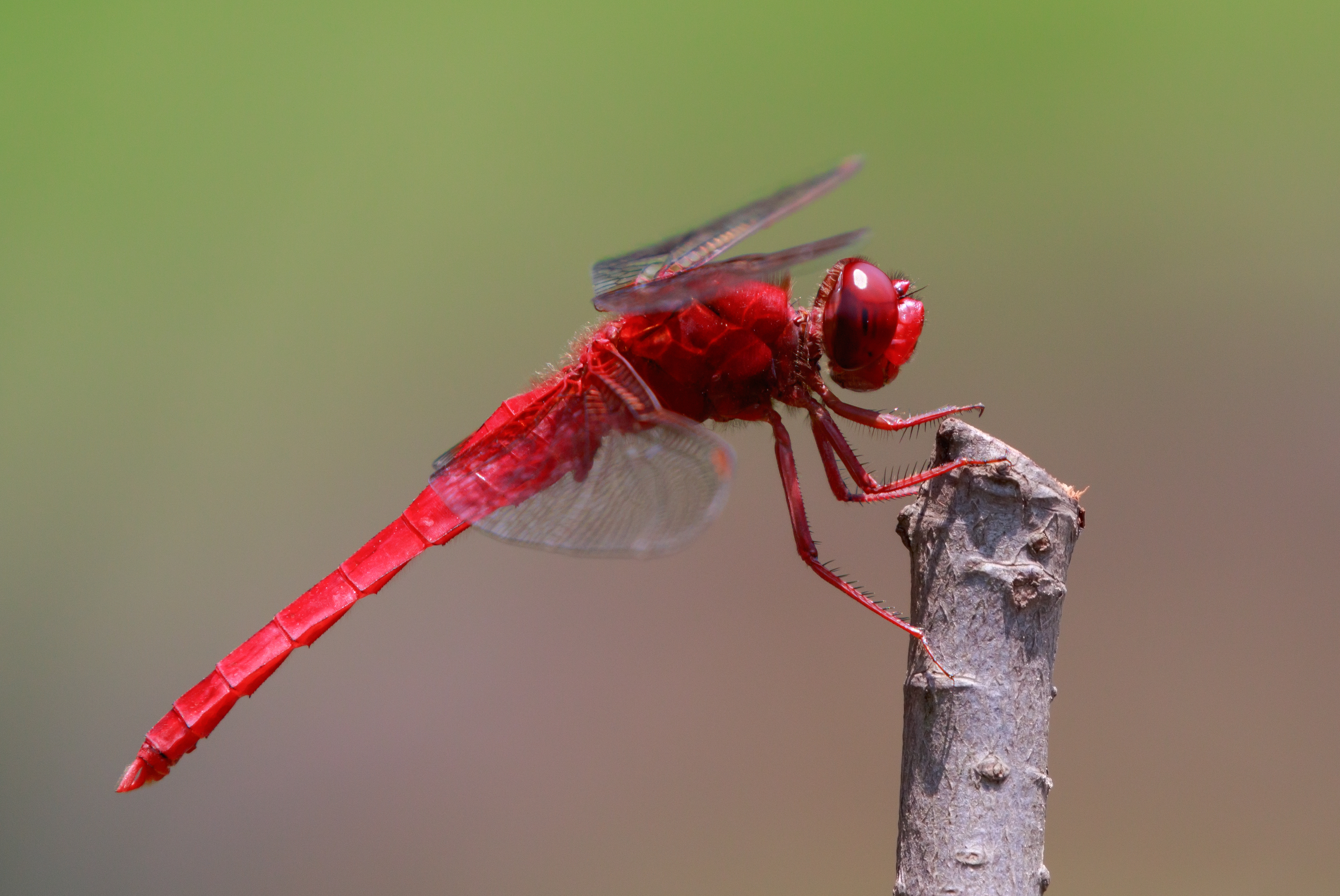
Male

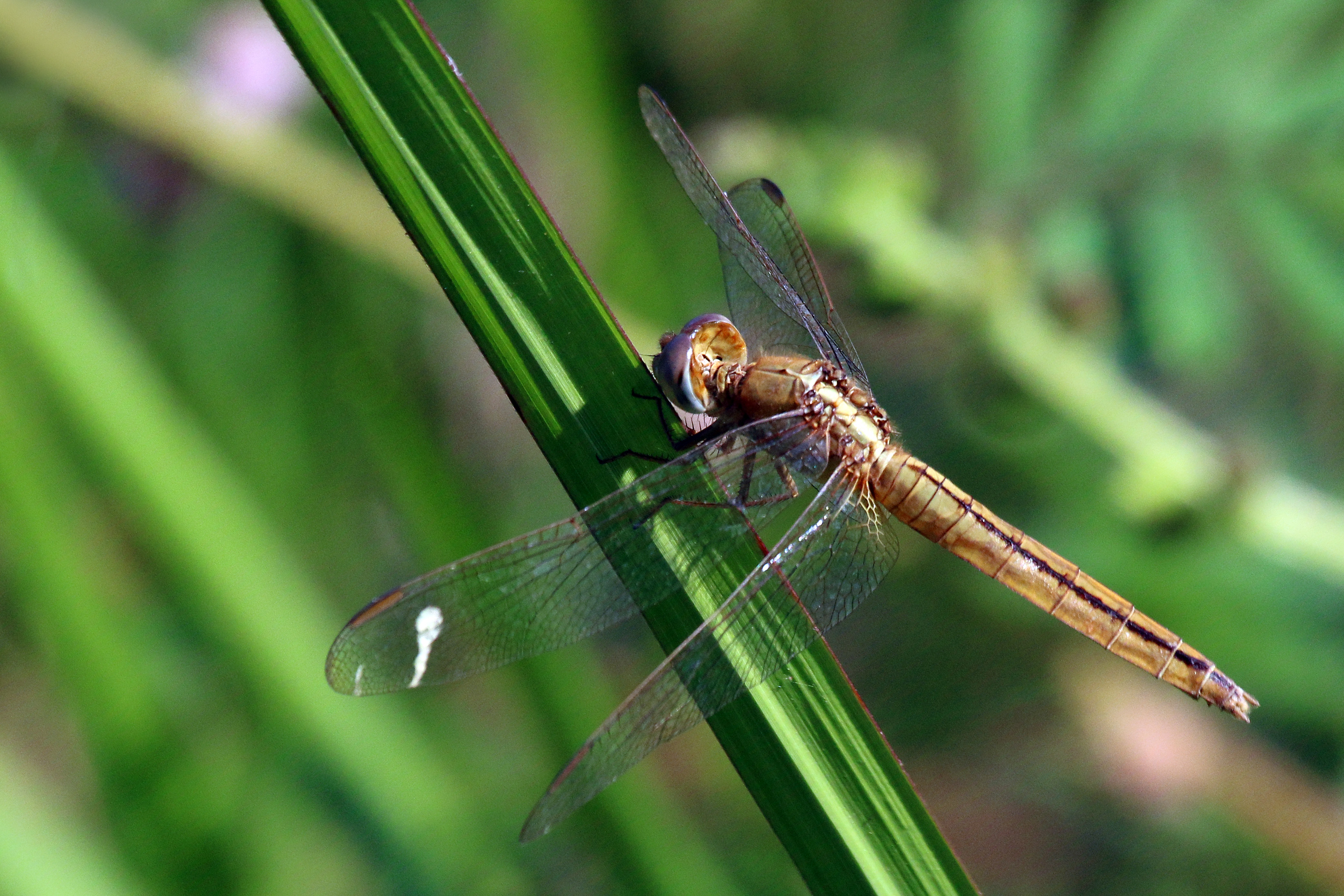
Female

==== Species: Diplacodes lefebvrii - black percher ====
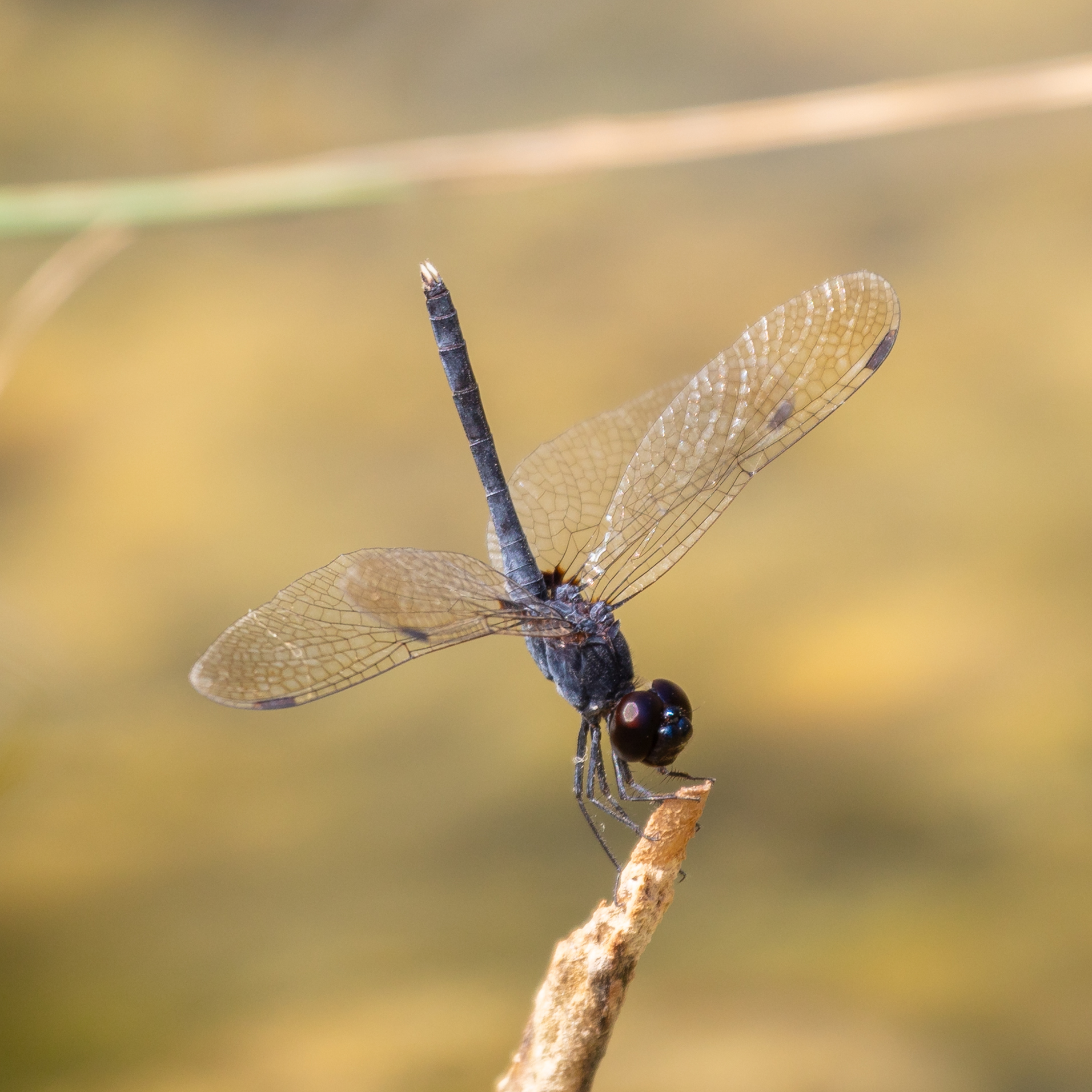
Male

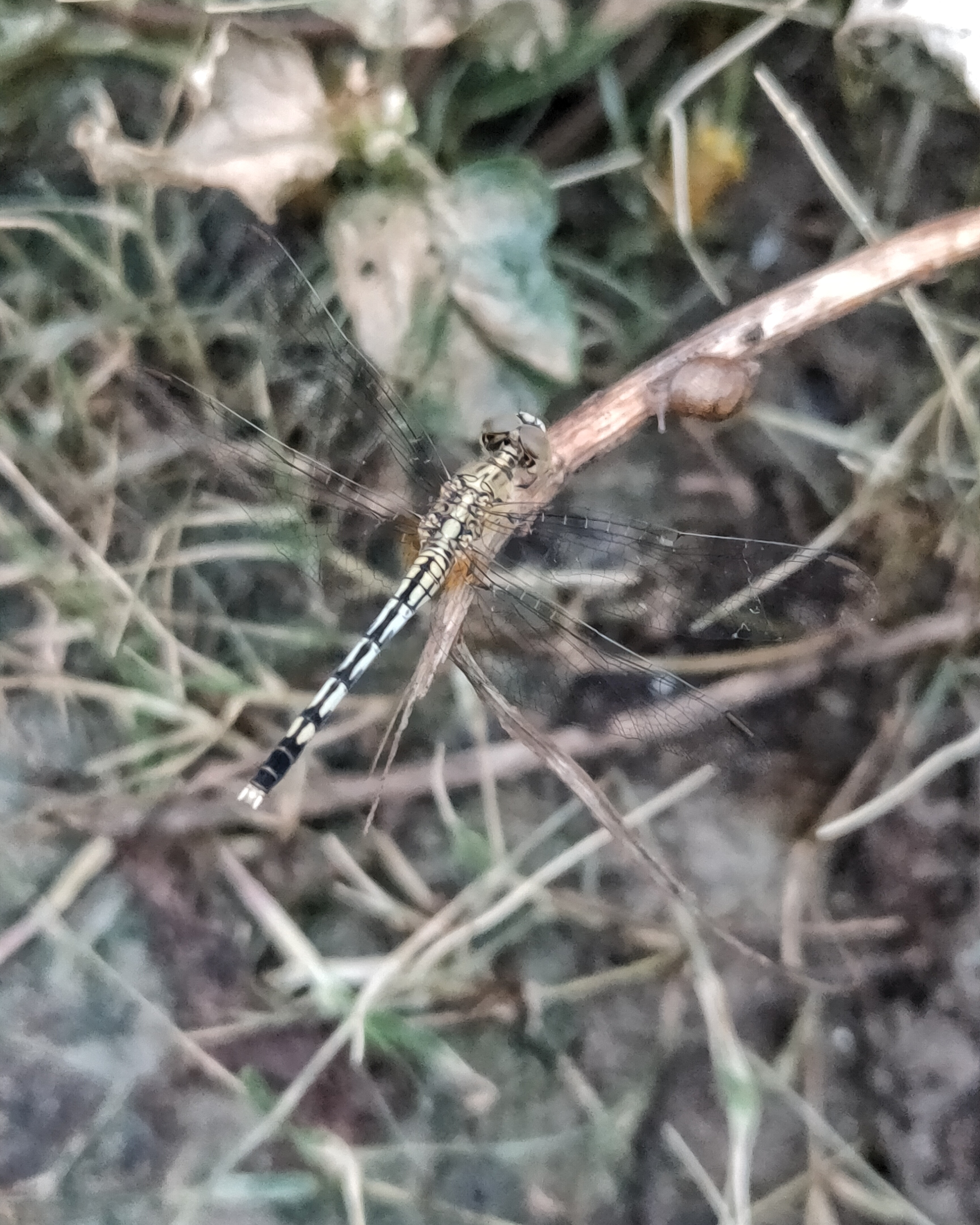
Female

==== Species: Diplacodes trivialis ====
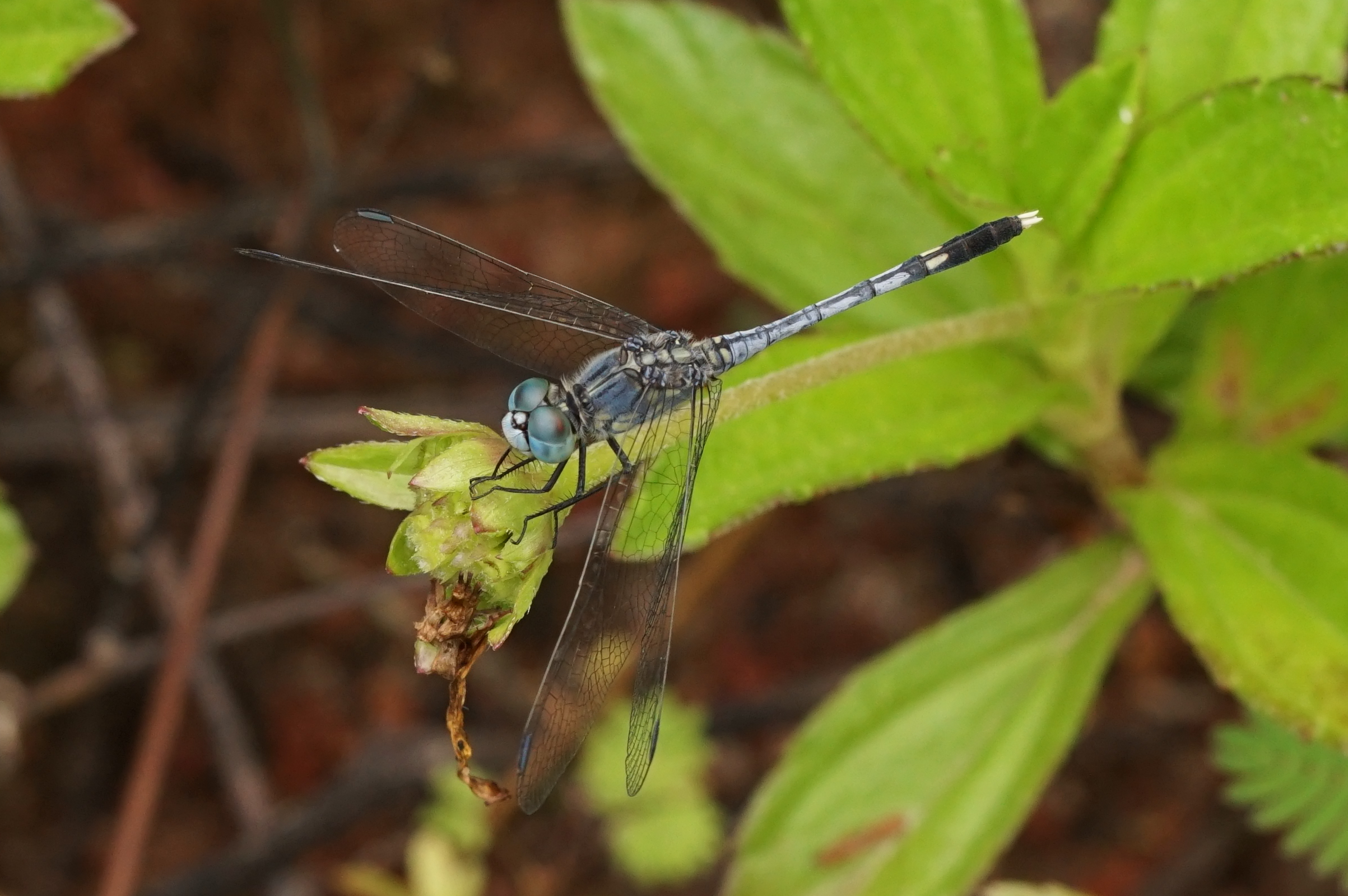
Male

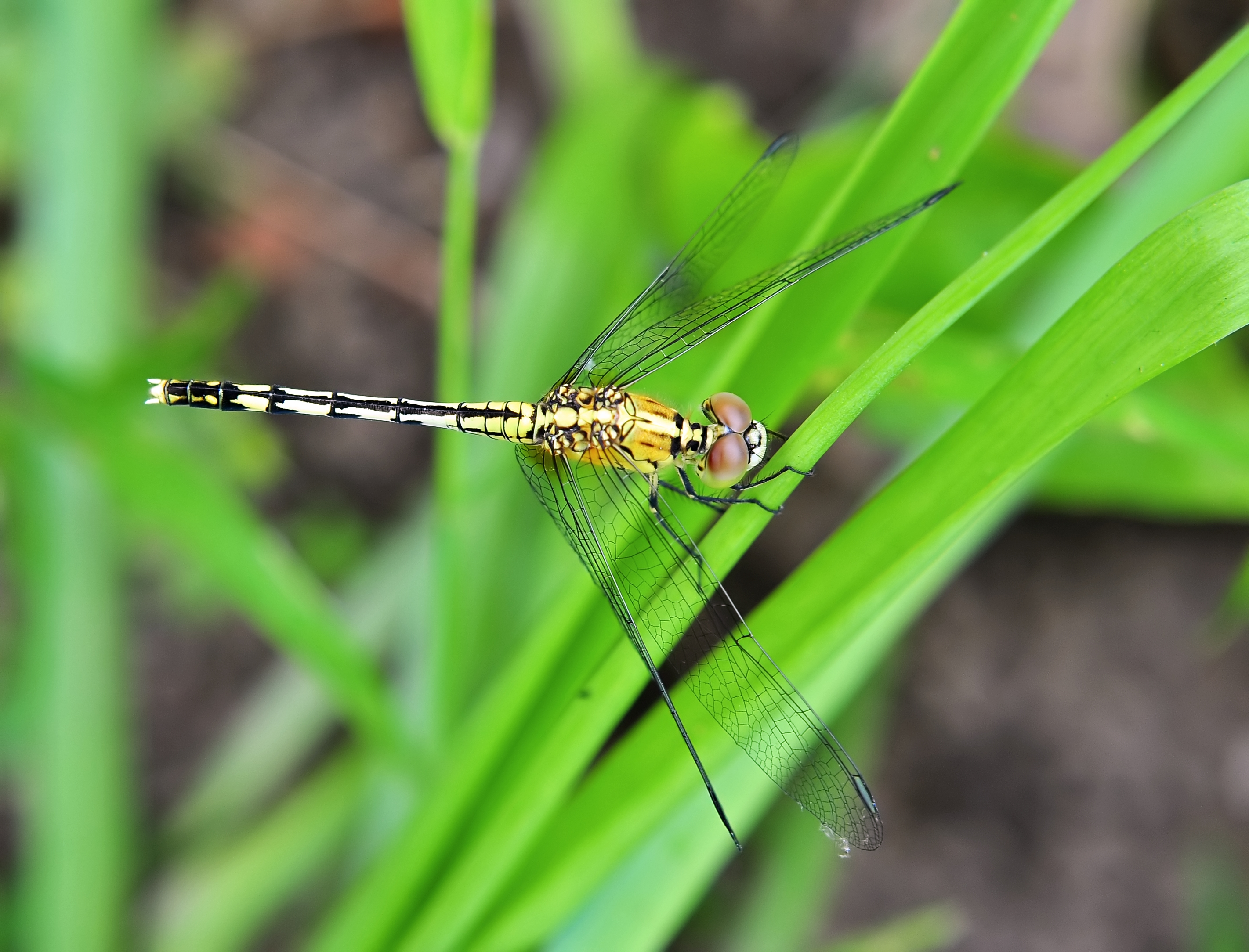
Female

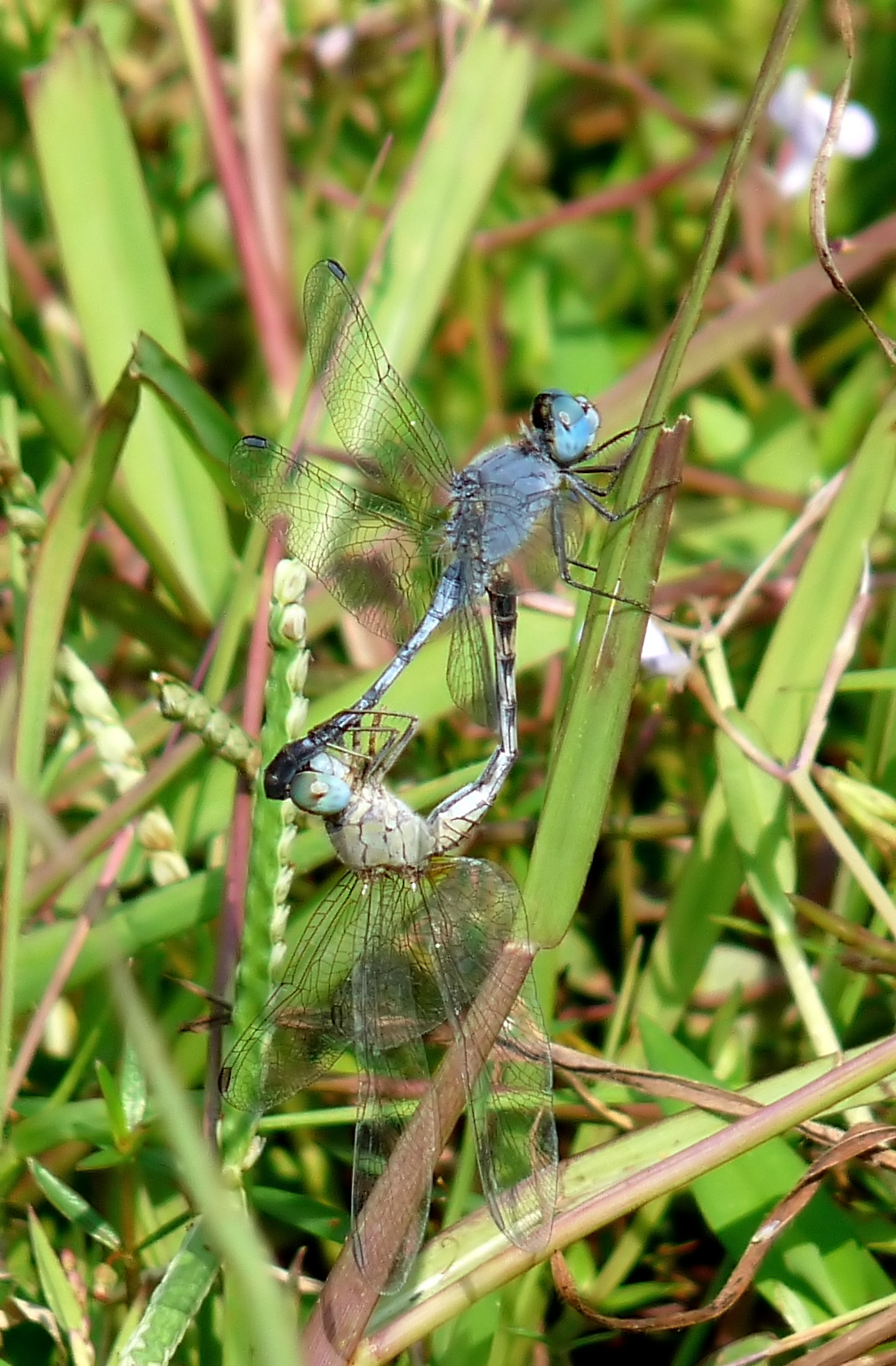
Mating

==== Species: Indothemis carnatica - white-tipped demon ====
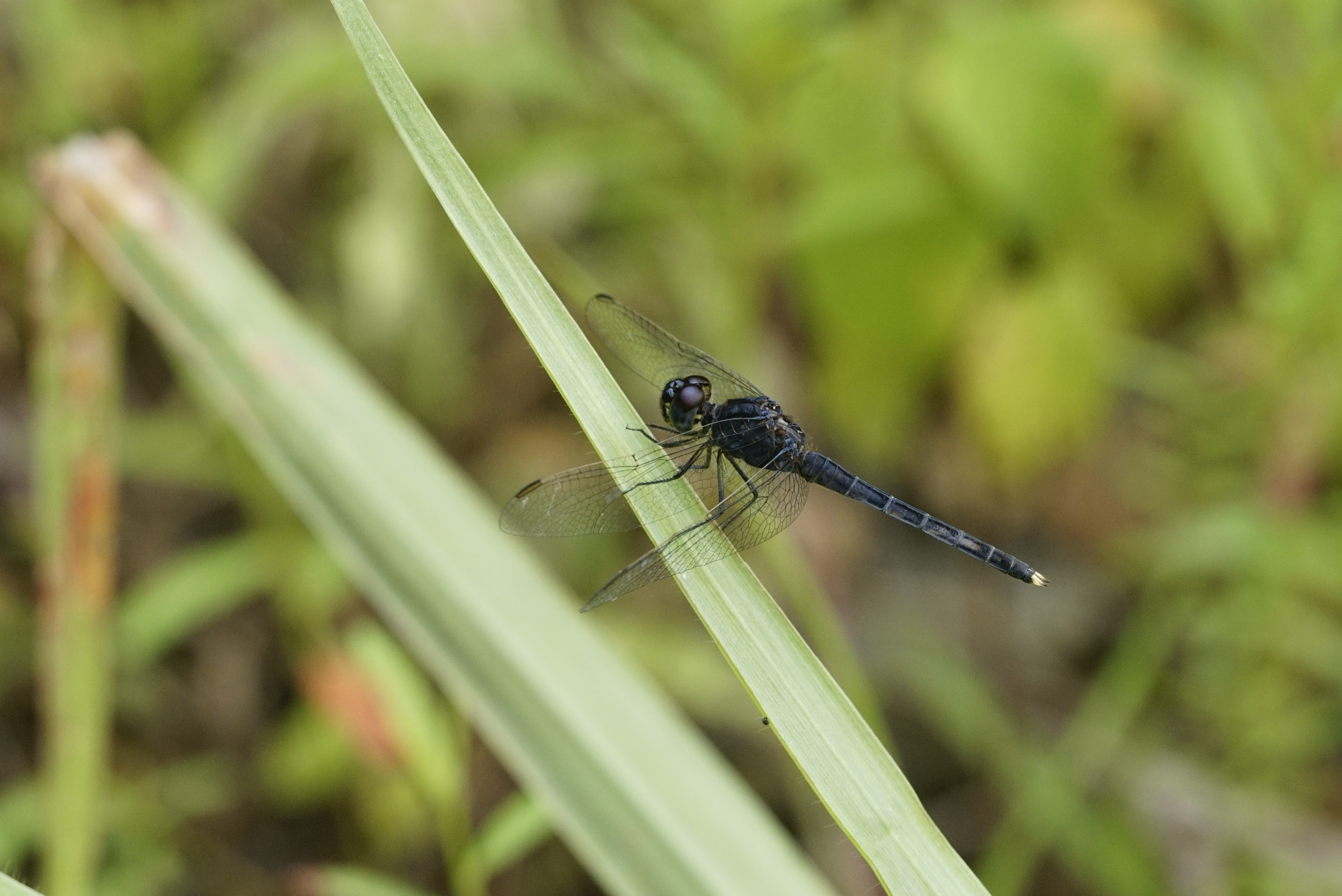
Male

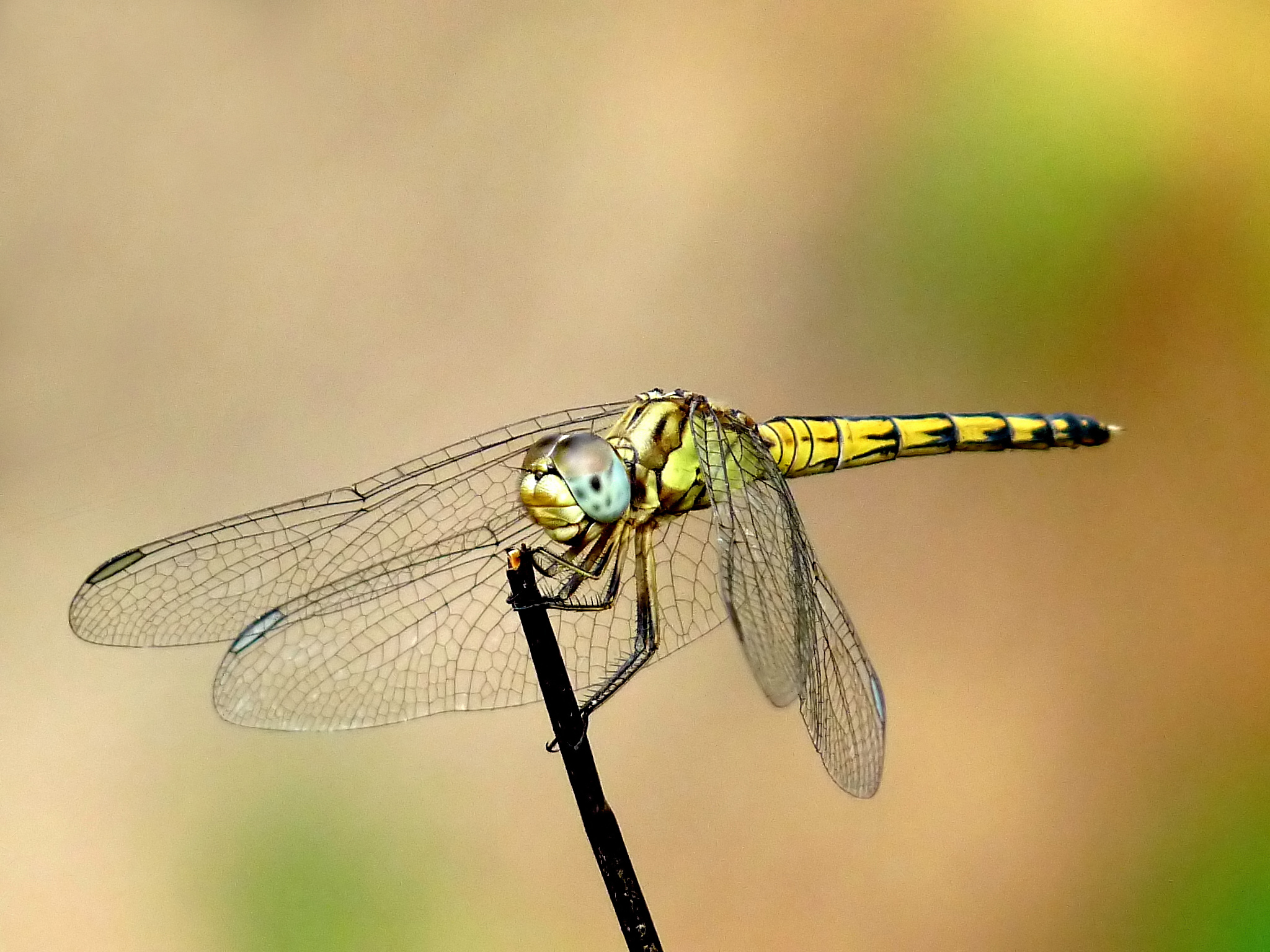
Female

==== Species: Lathrecista asiatica - Asian bloodtail ====
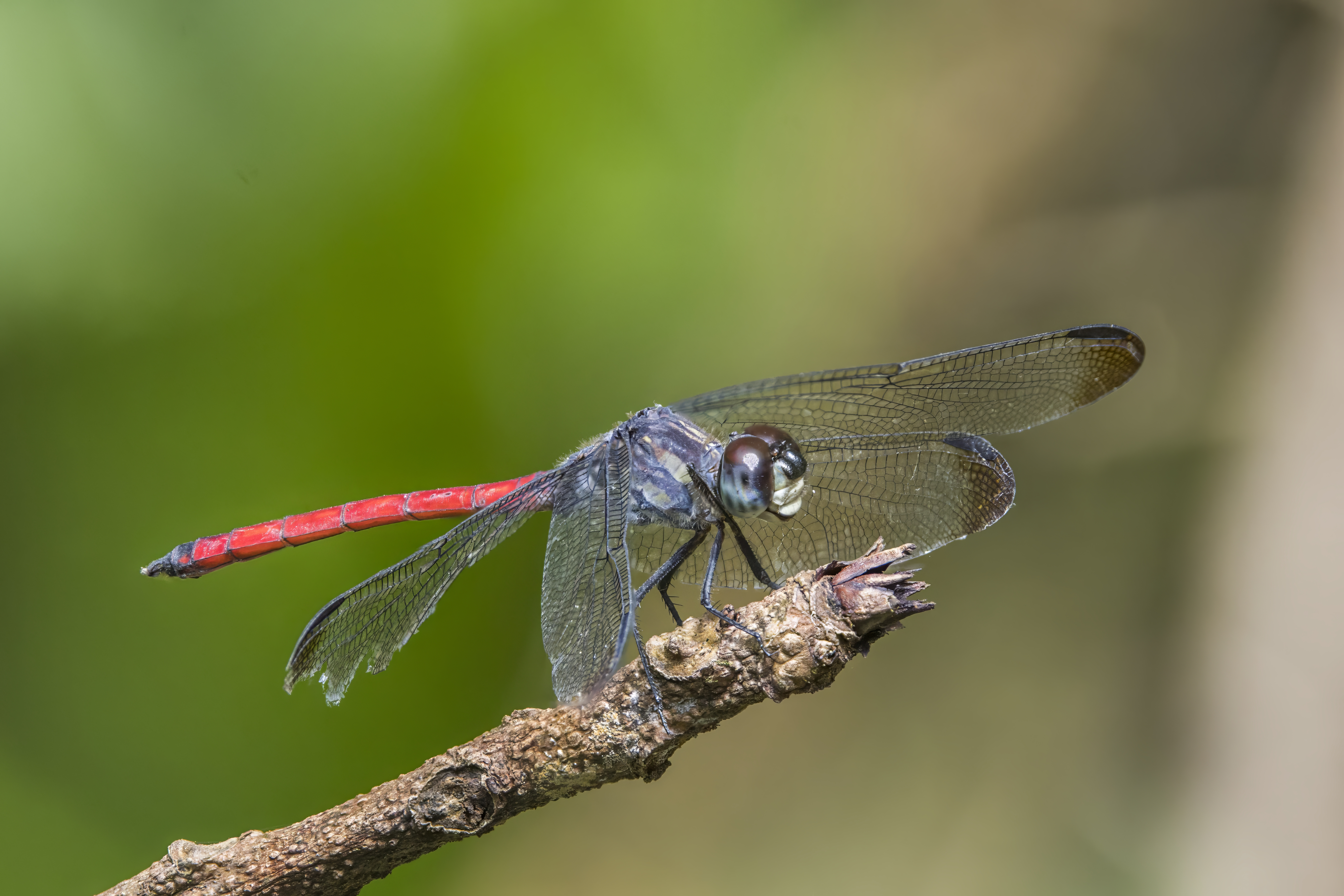
Male

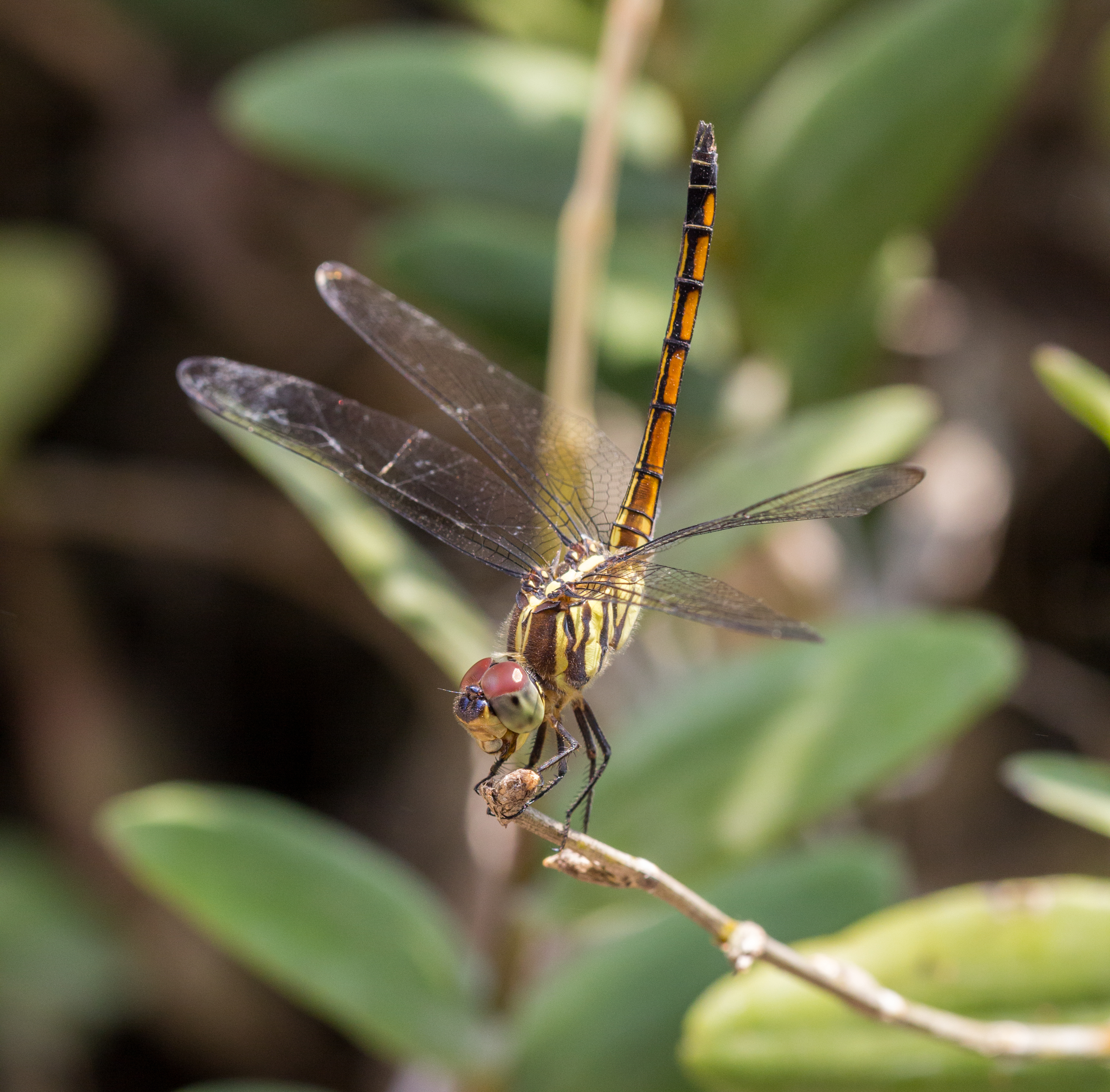
Female

==== Species: Neurothemis intermedia - paddyfield parasol ====
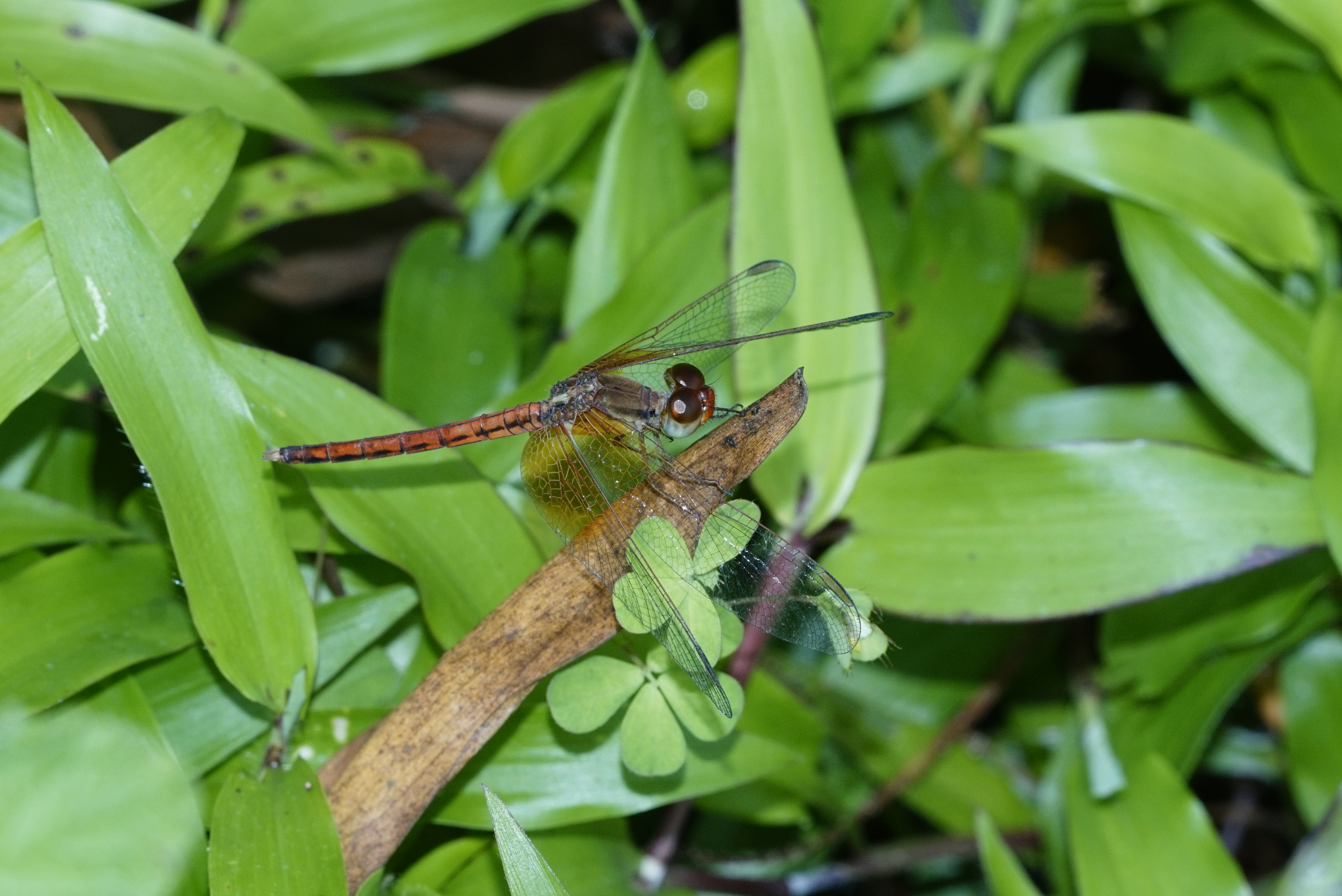
Male

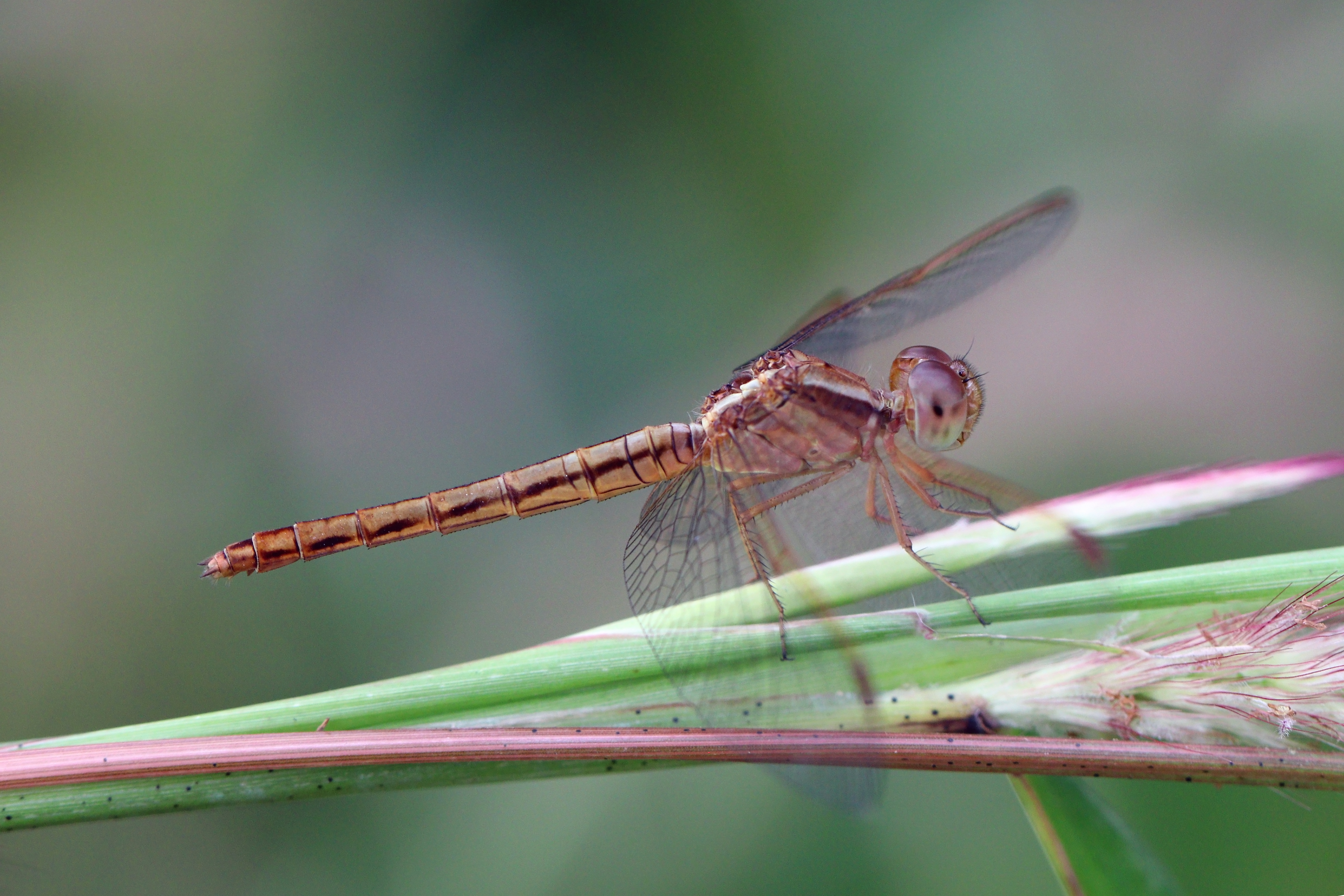
Female

==== Species: Neurothemis fulvia - russet percher ====
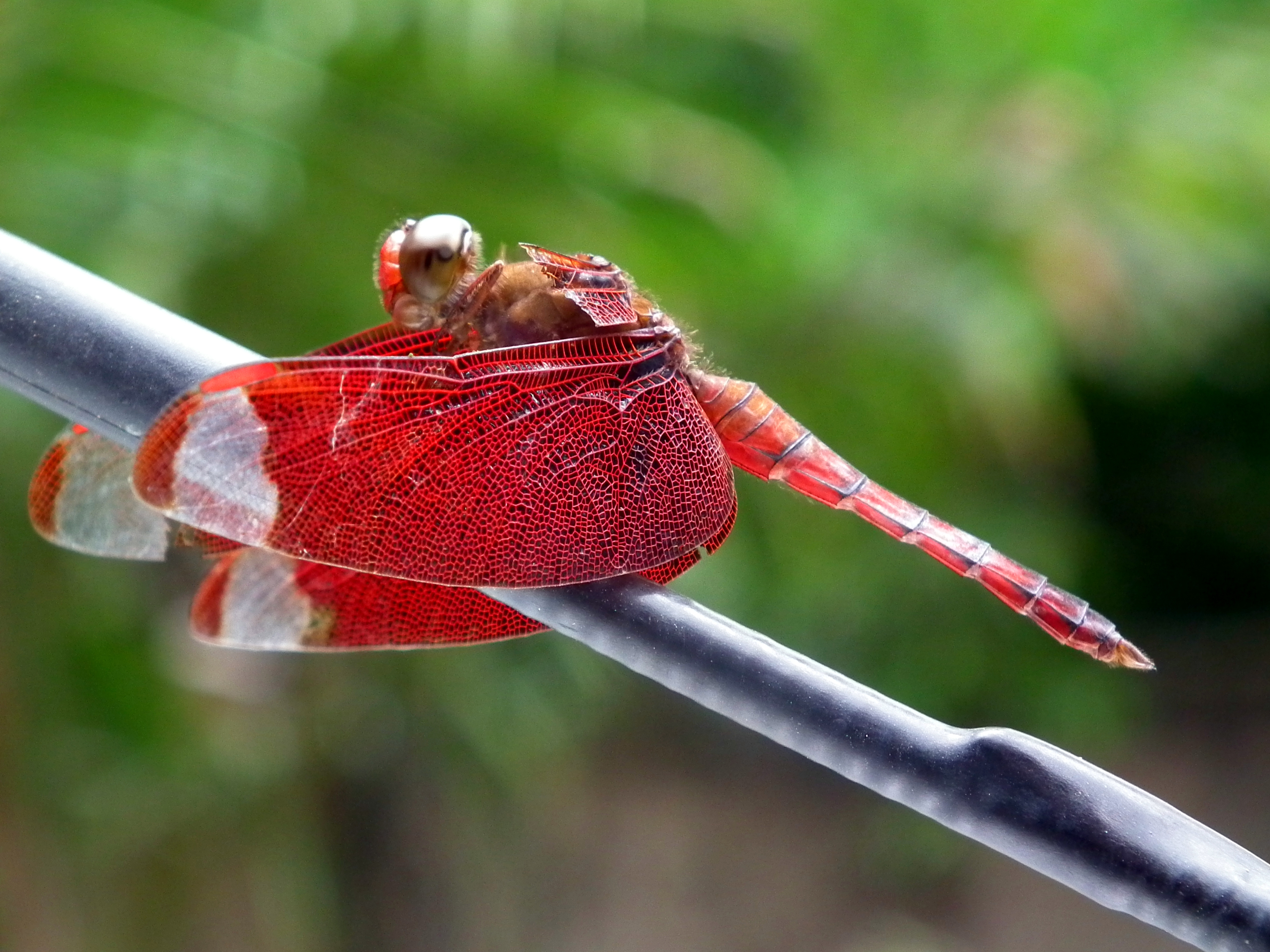
Male

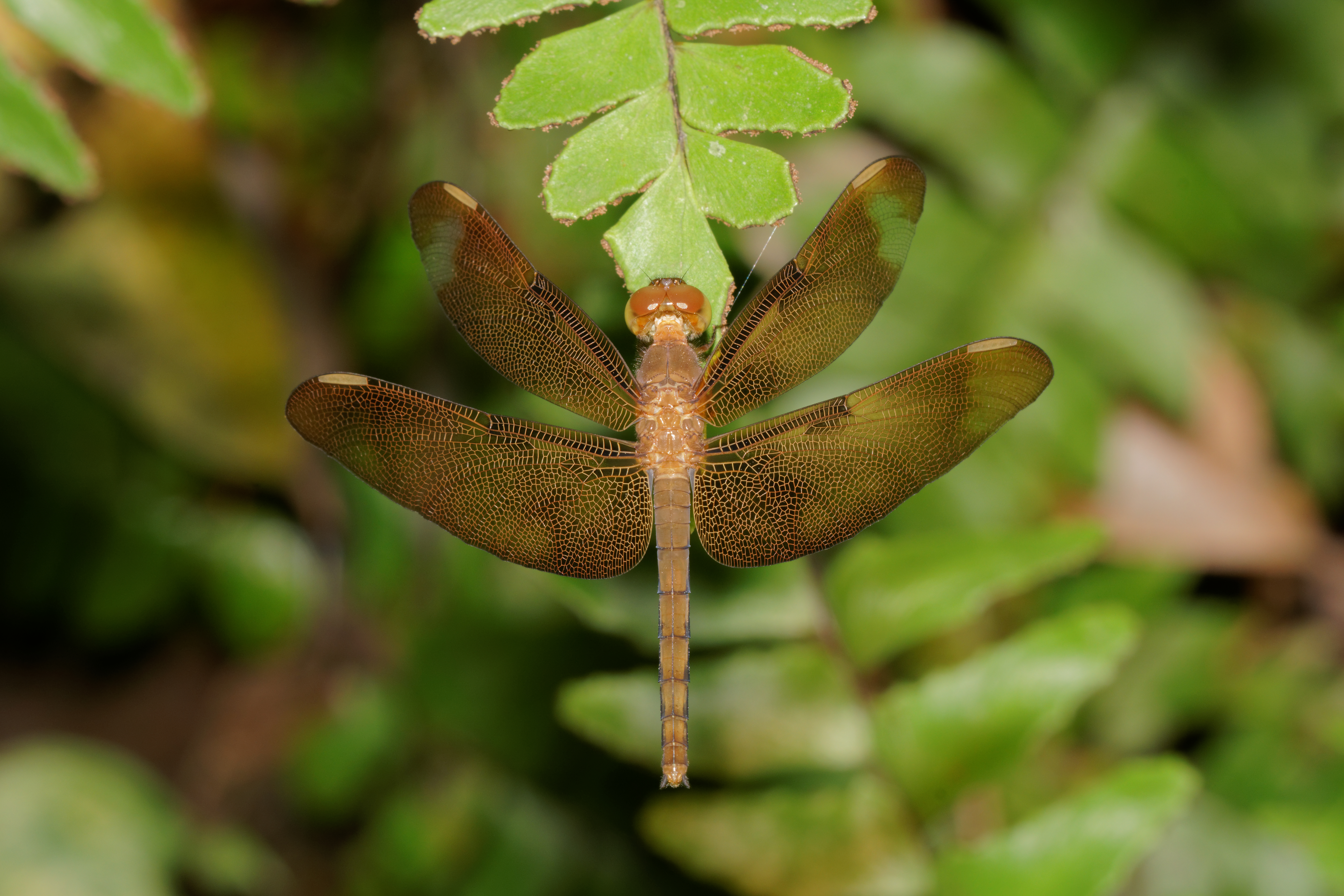
Female

==== Species: Neurothemis tullia - pied paddy skimmer ====
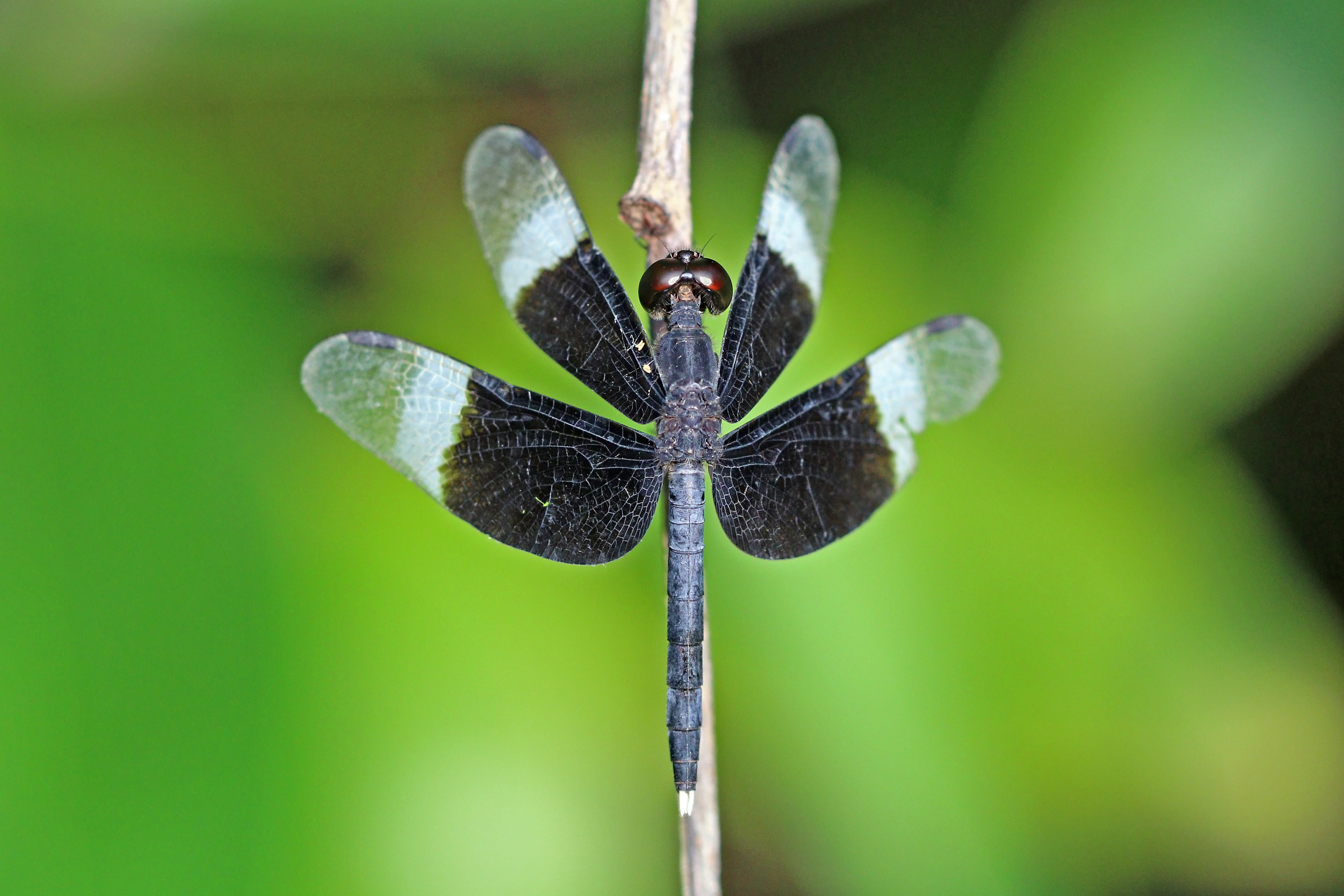
Male

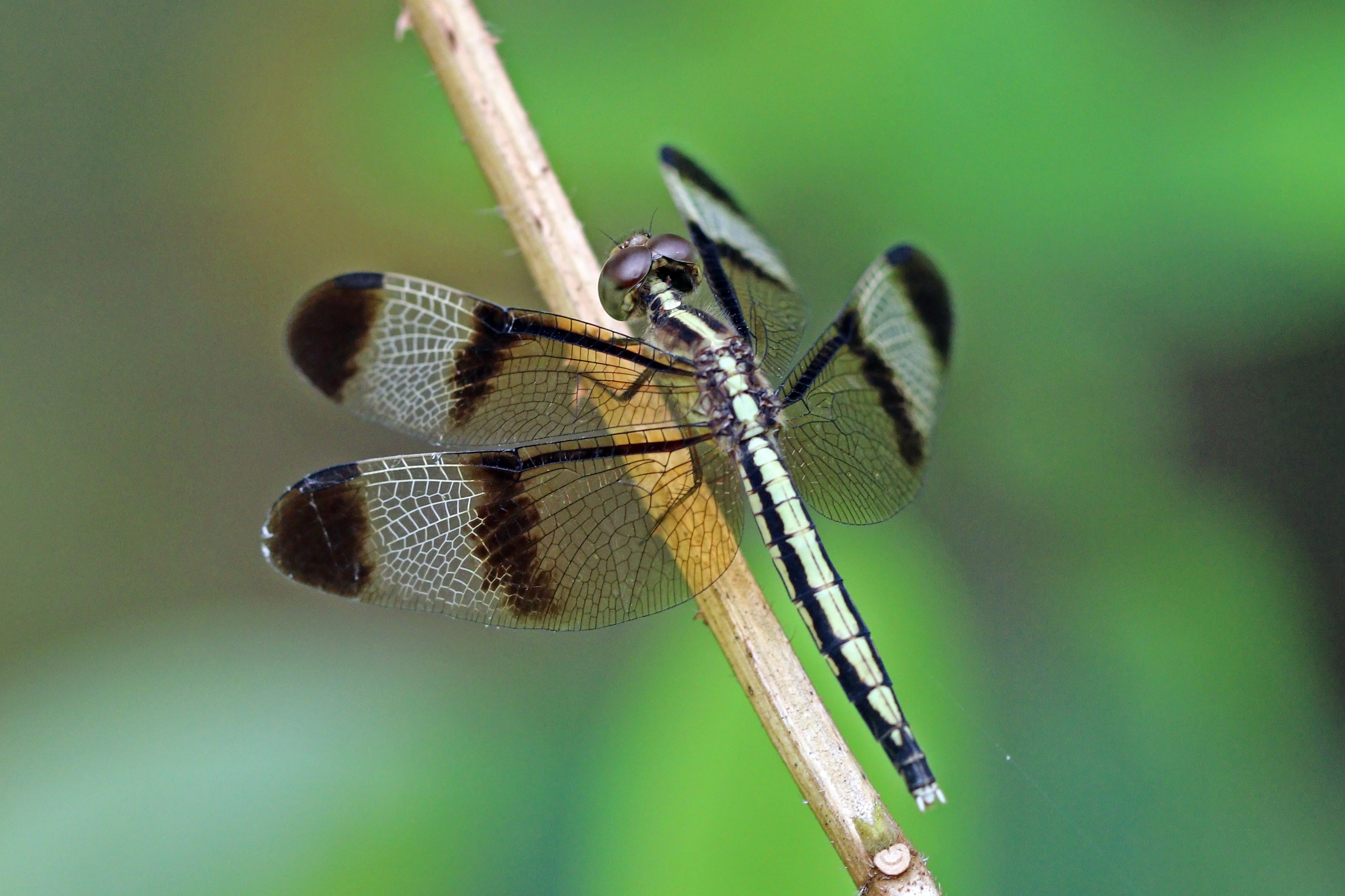
Female

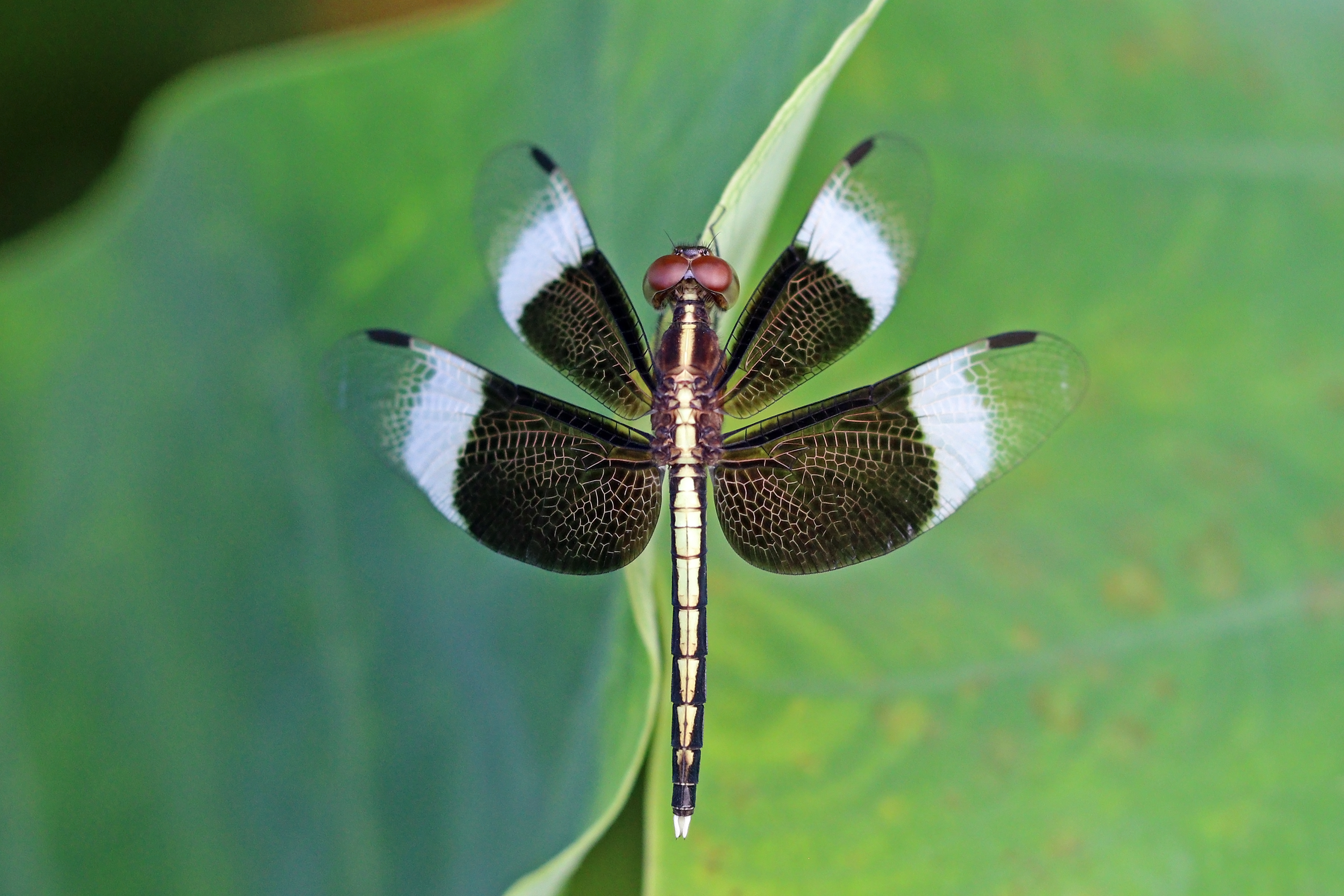
Immature male

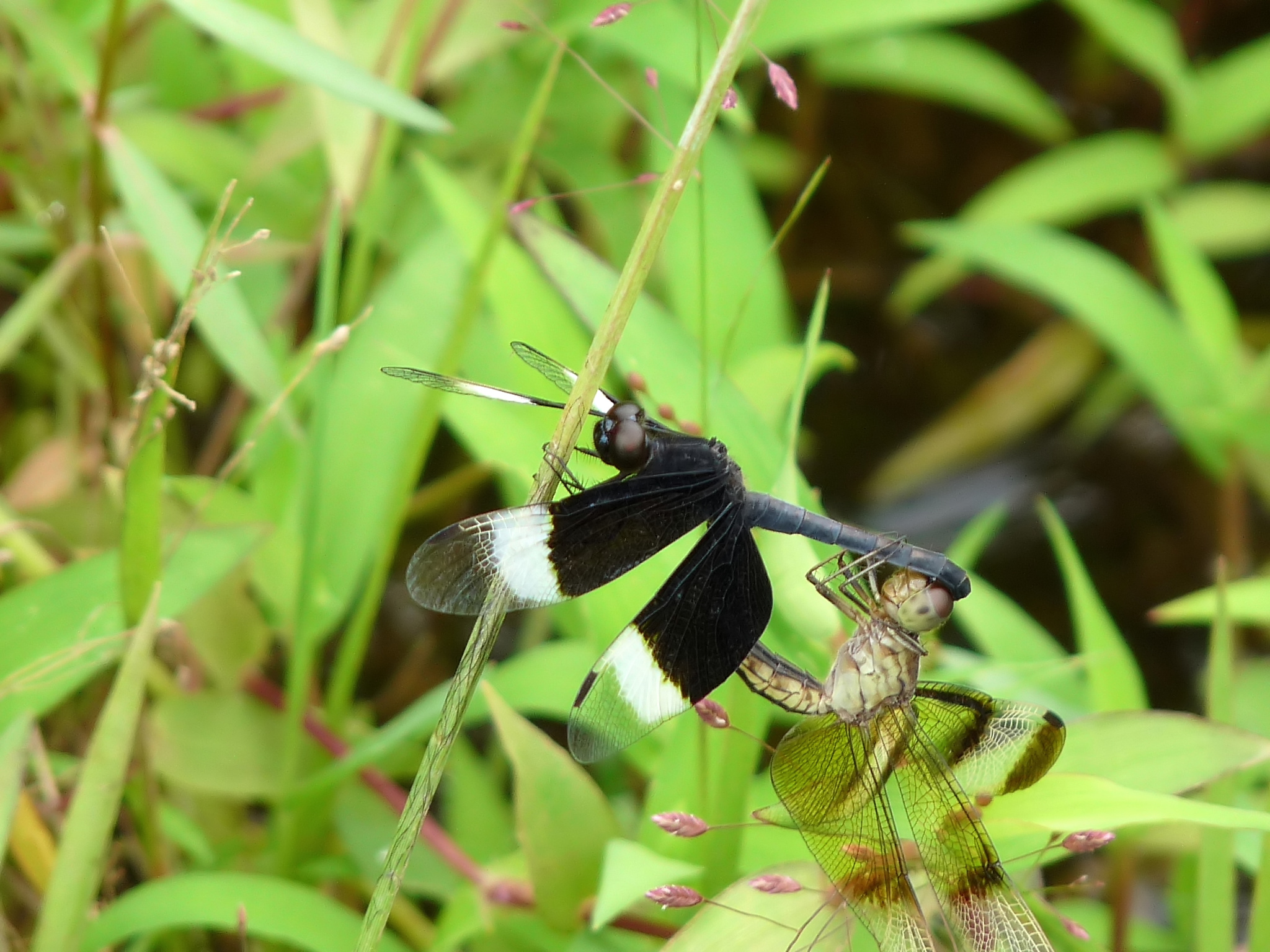
Mating

==== Species: Orthetrum glaucum ====
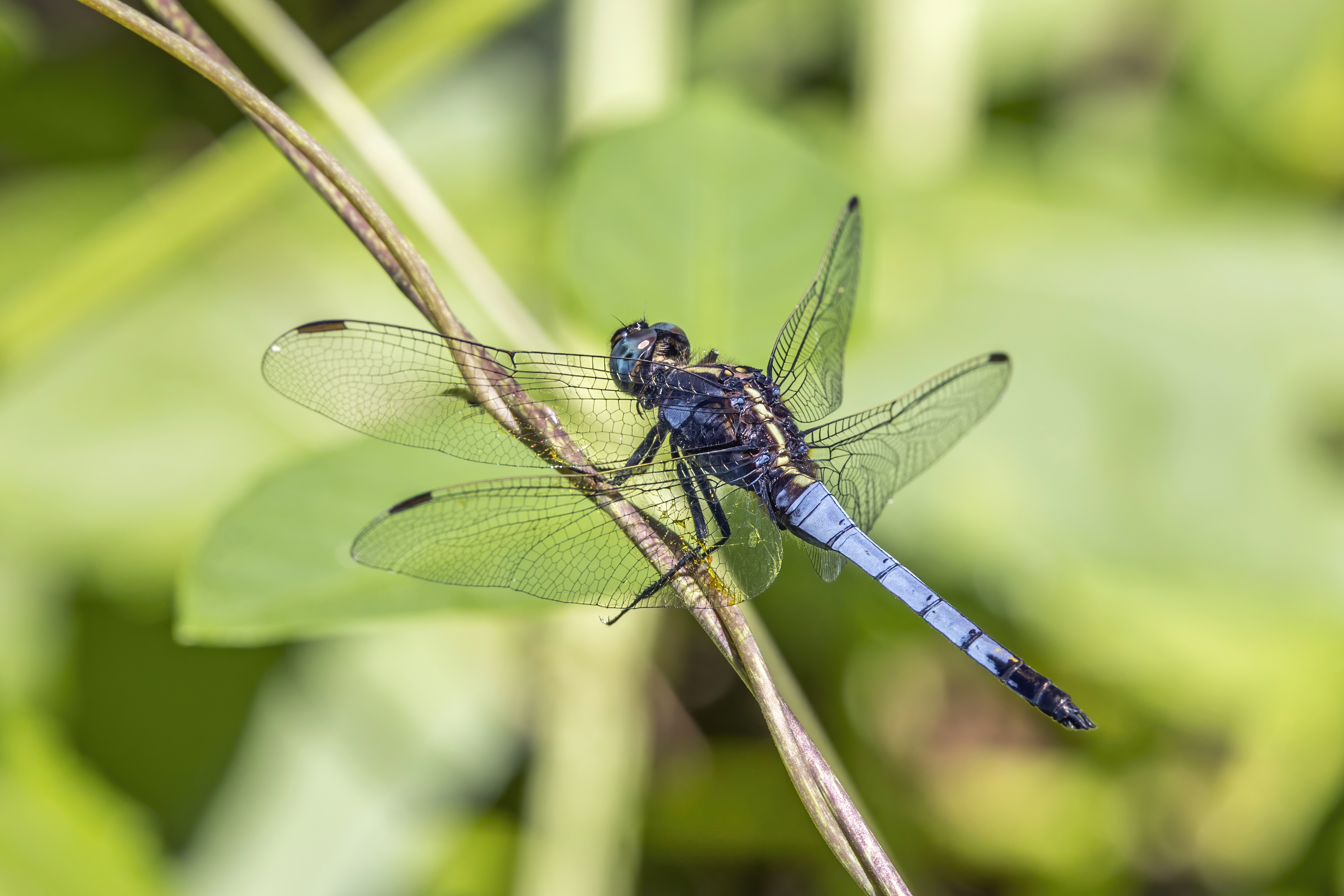
Male

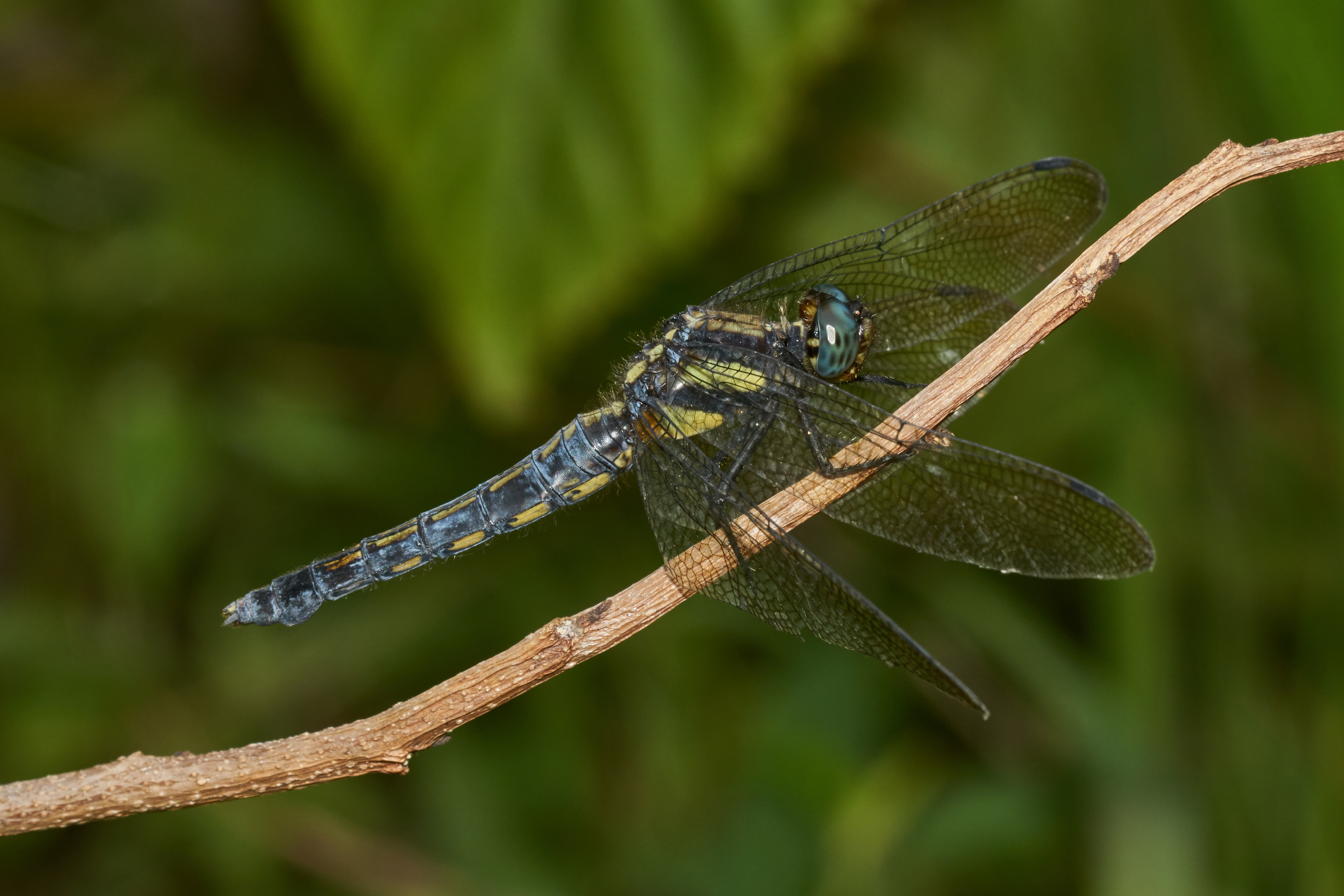
Female

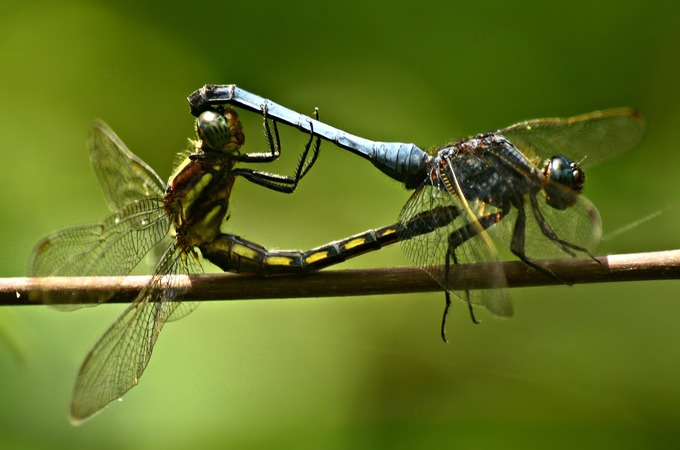
Mating

==== Species: Orthetrum luzonicum - slender blue skimmer ====
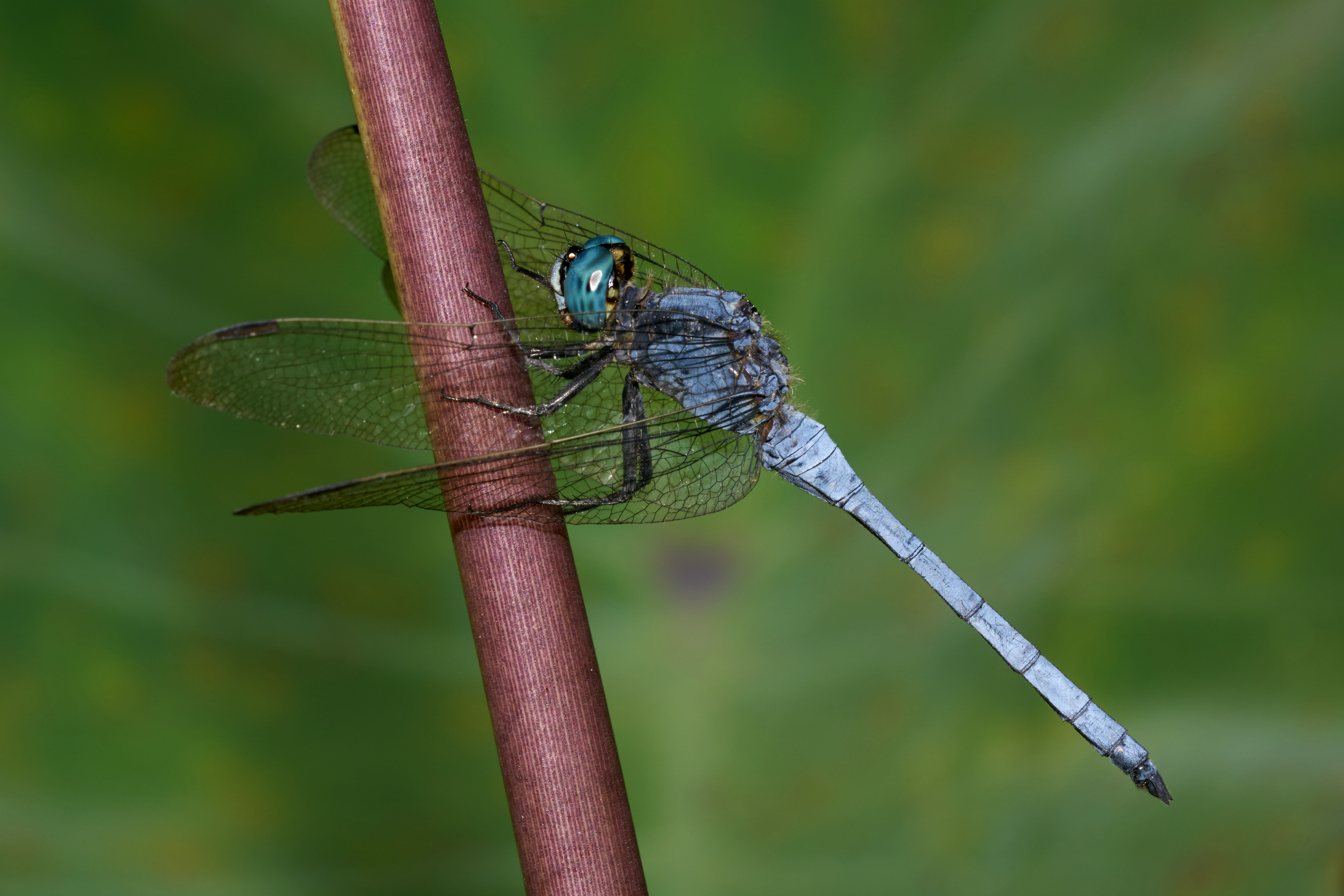
Male

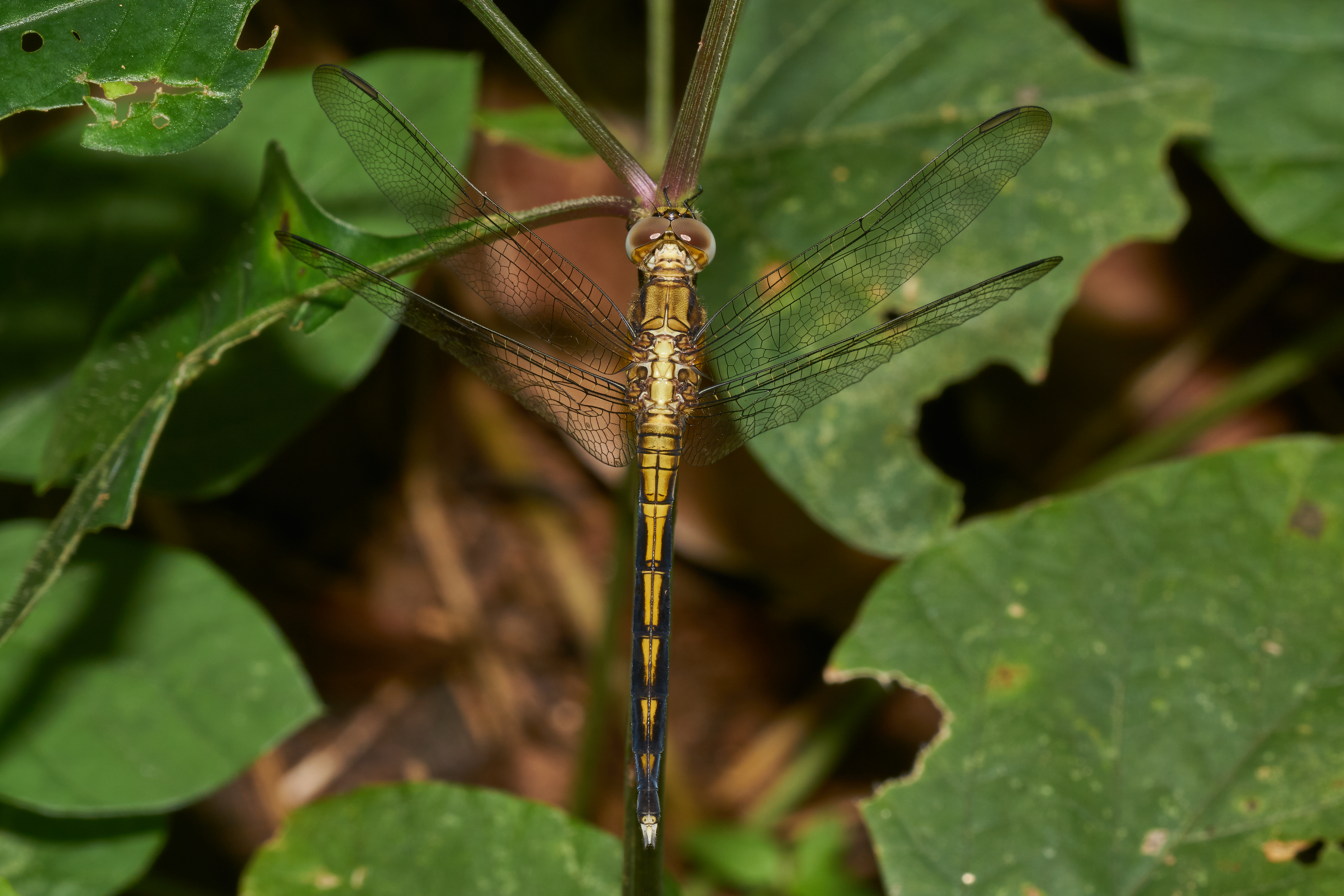
Female

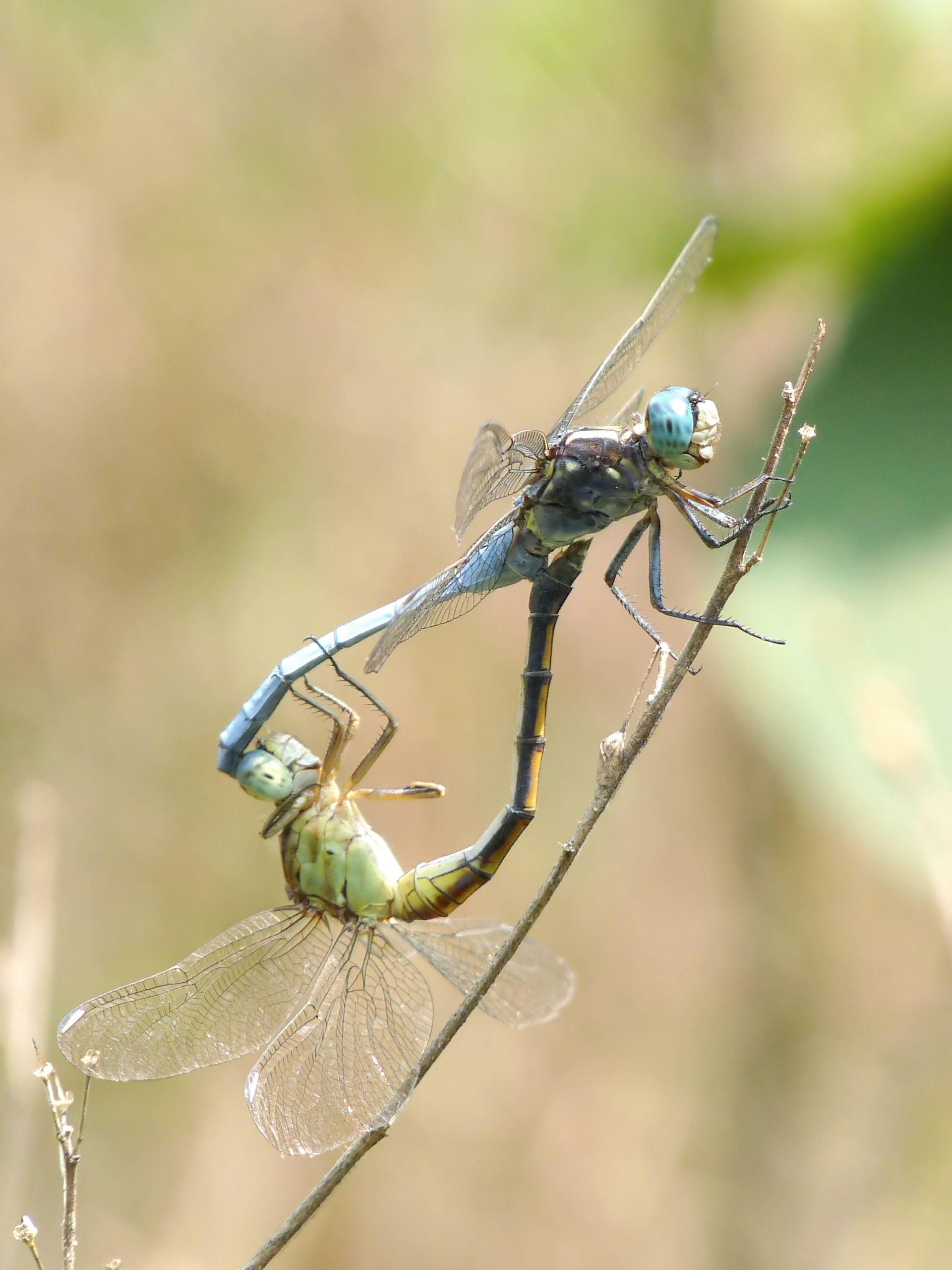
Mating

==== Species: Orthetrum pruinosum - crimson-tailed marsh hawk ====
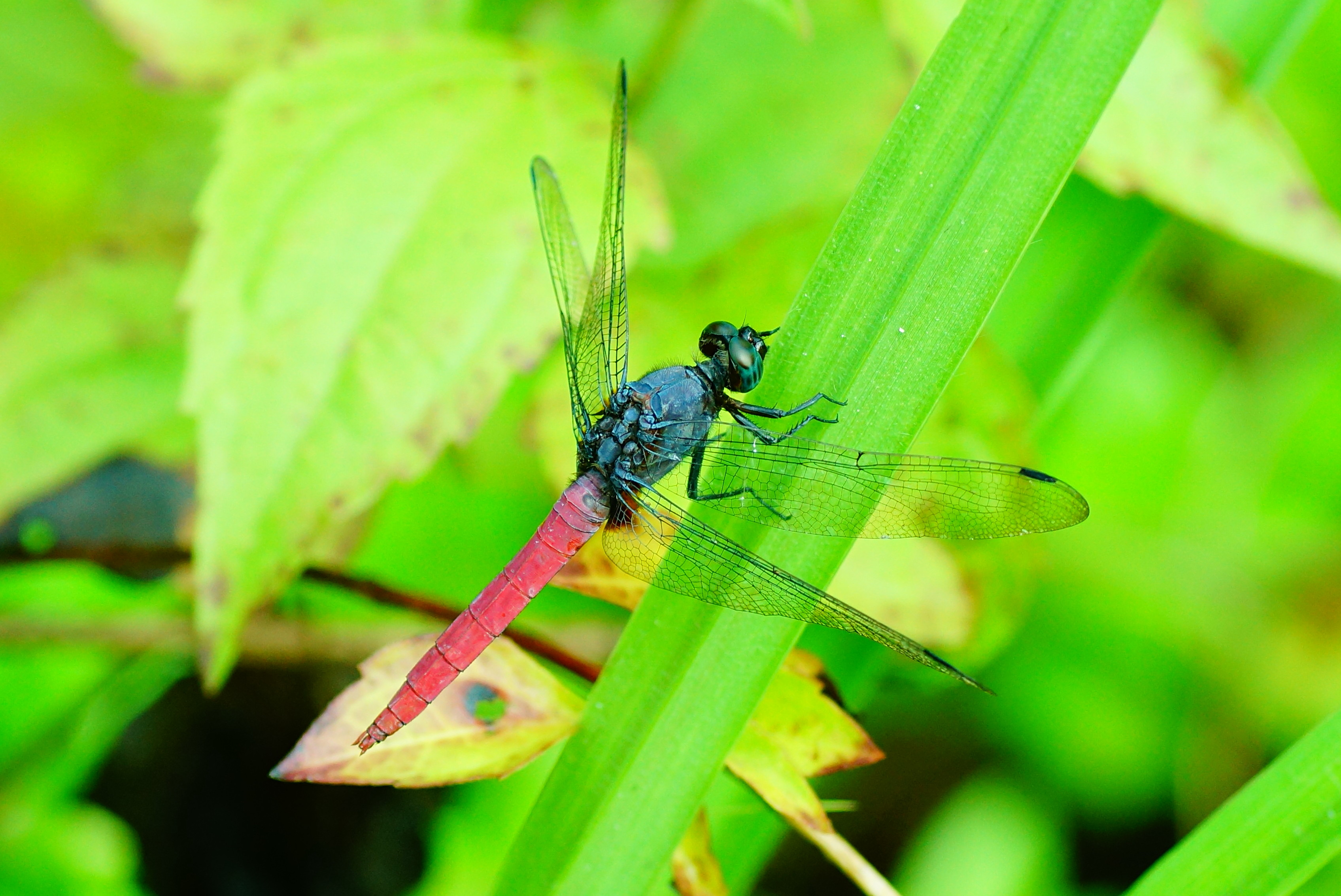
Male

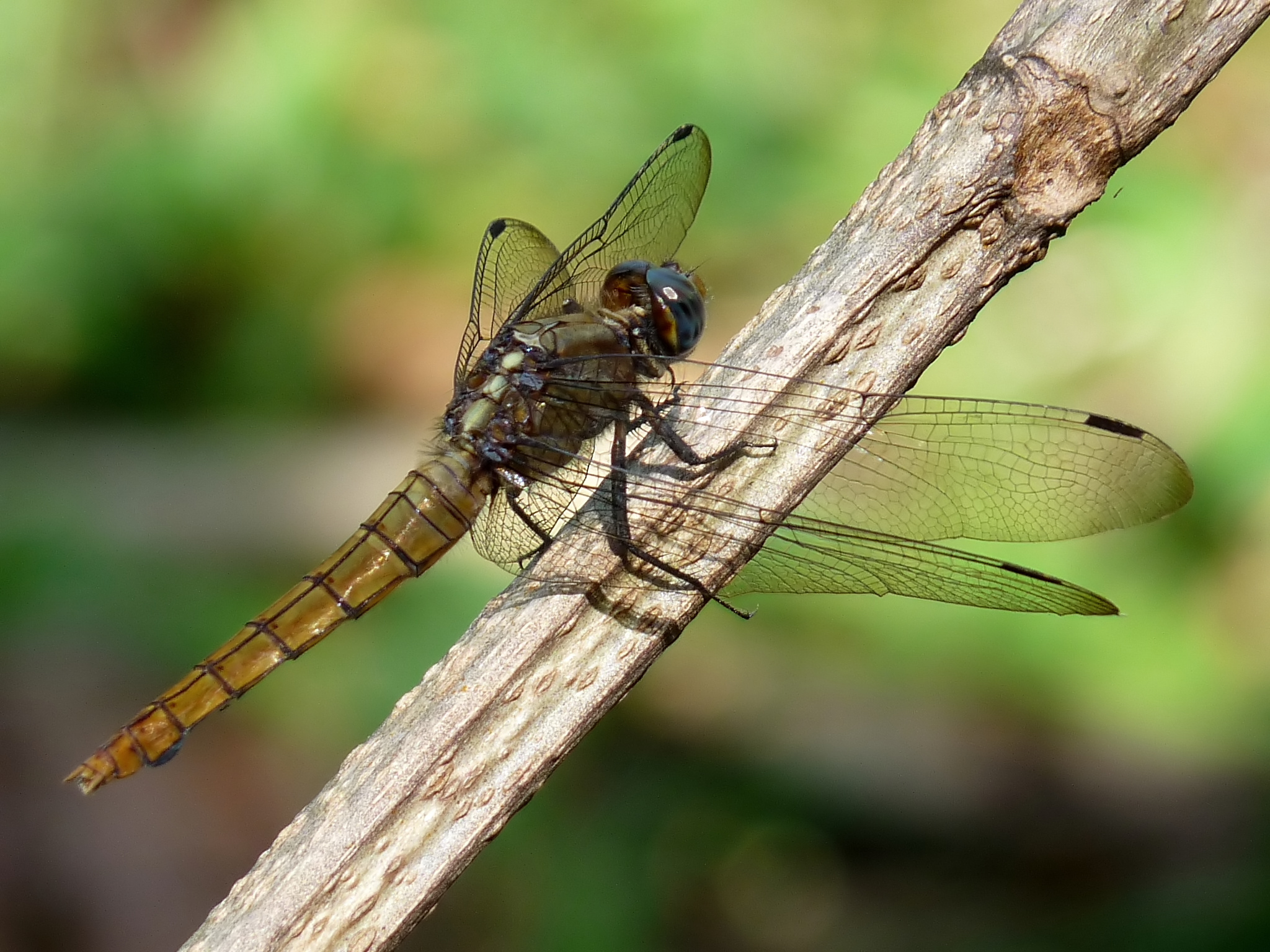
Female

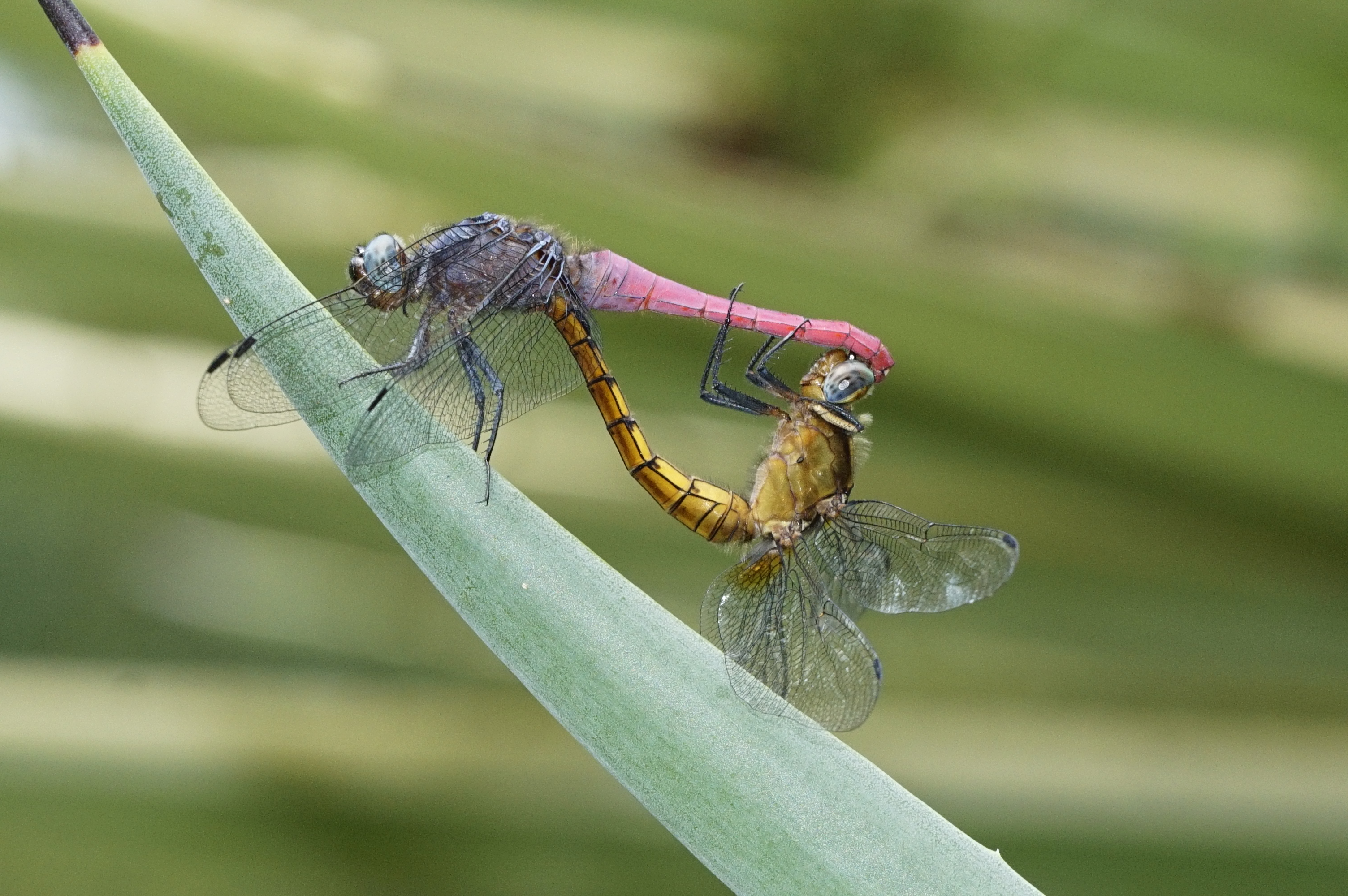
Mating

==== Species: Orthetrum sabina - slender skimmer ====
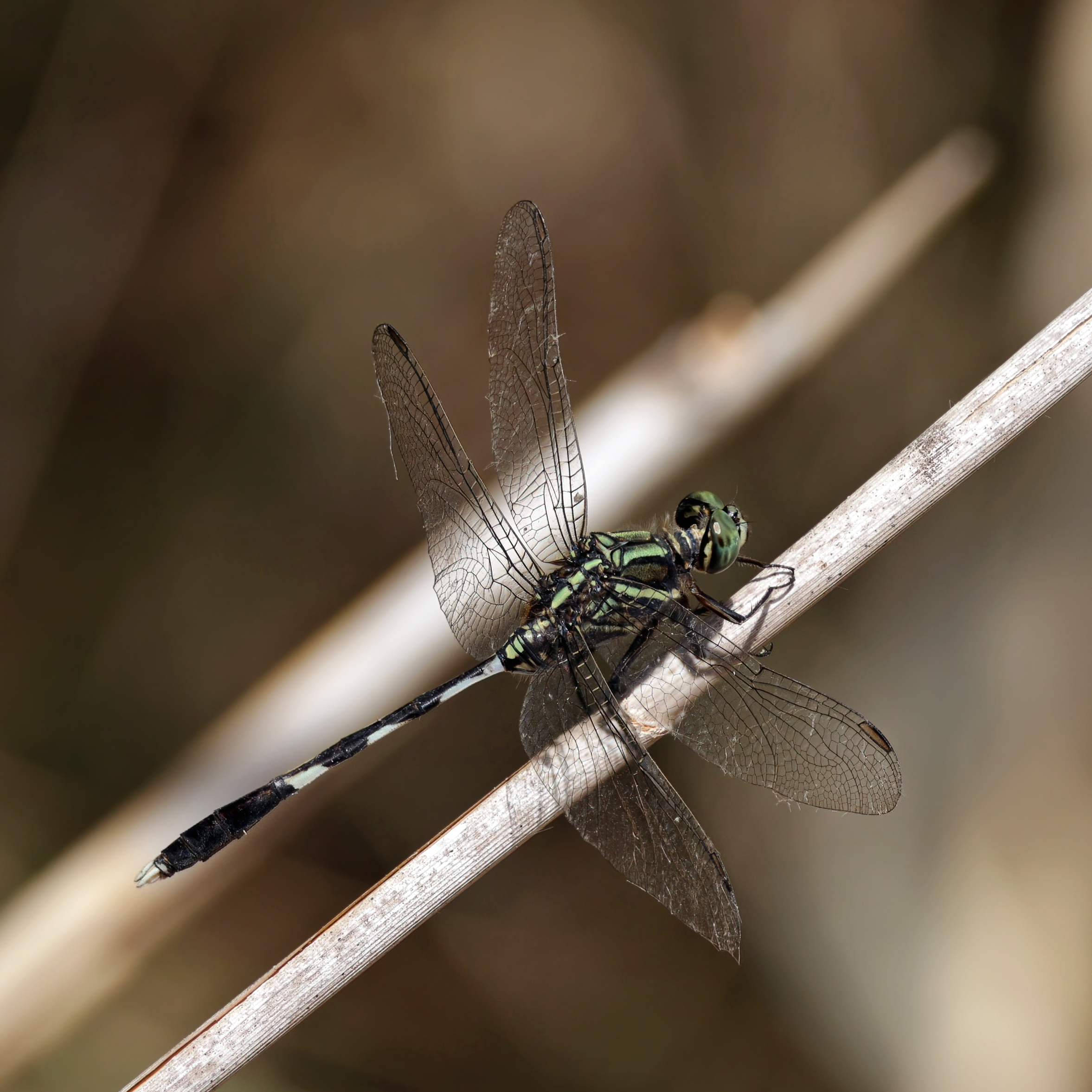
Male

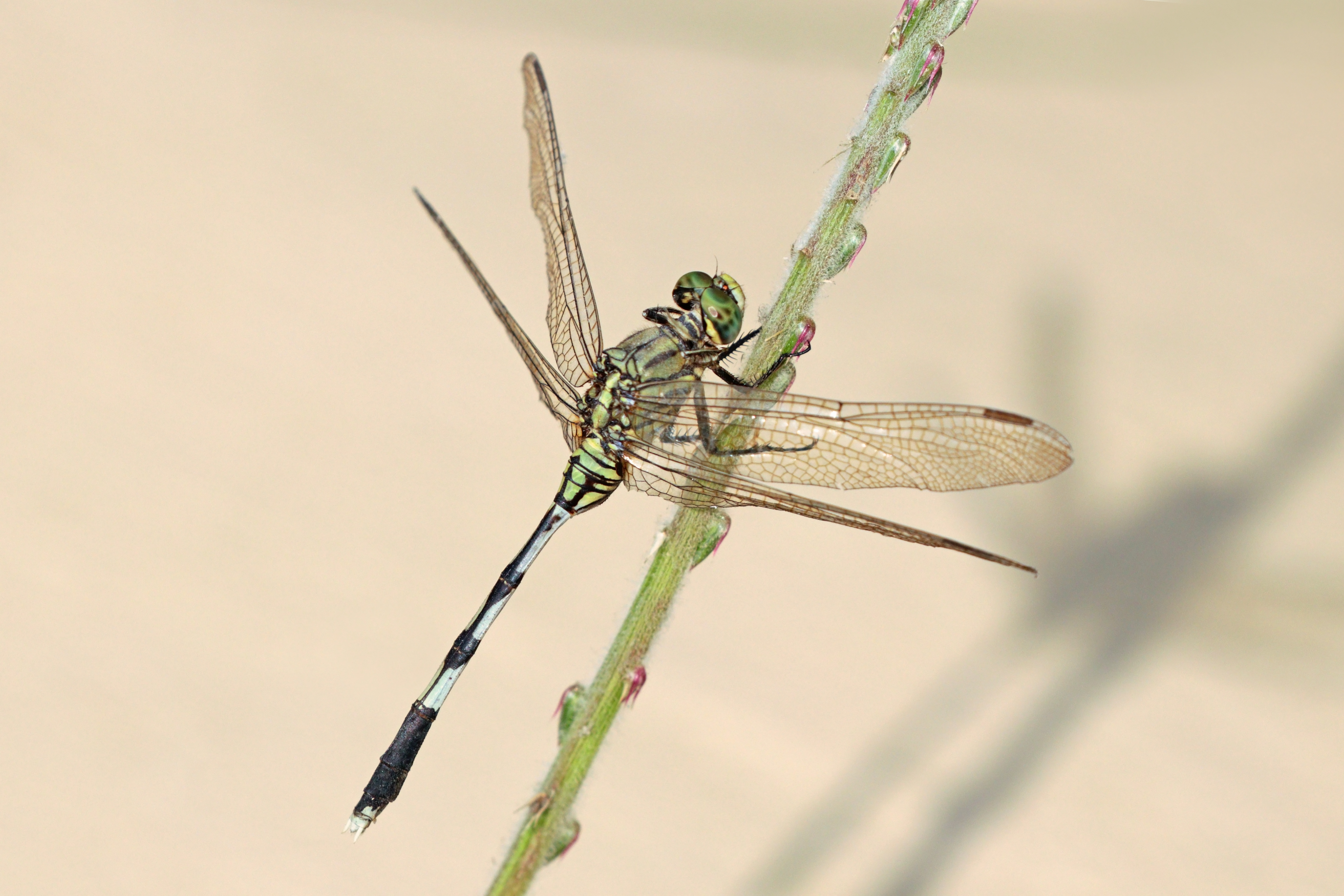
Female

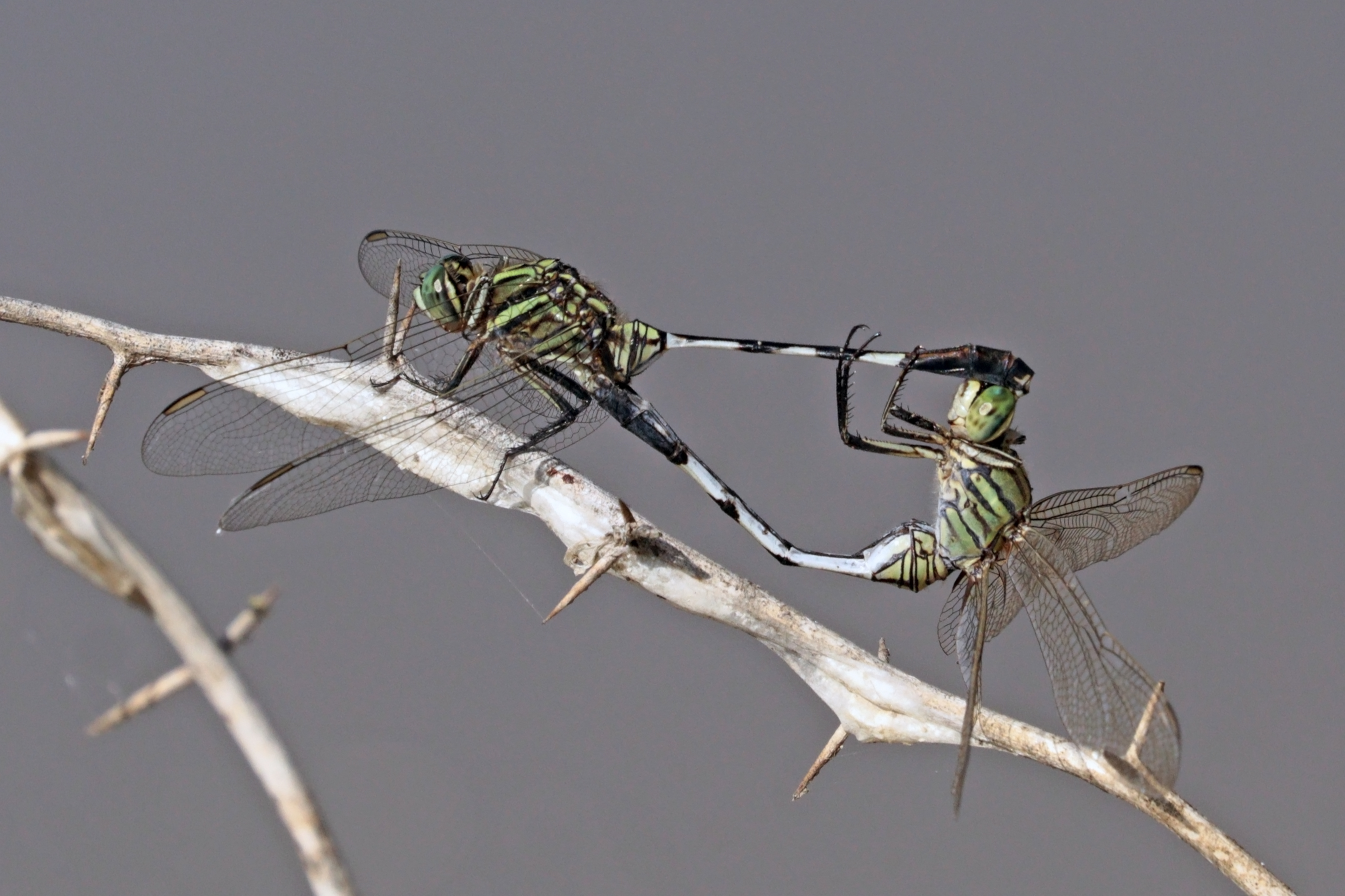
Mating

==== Species: Orthetrum taeniolatum - little skimmer ====
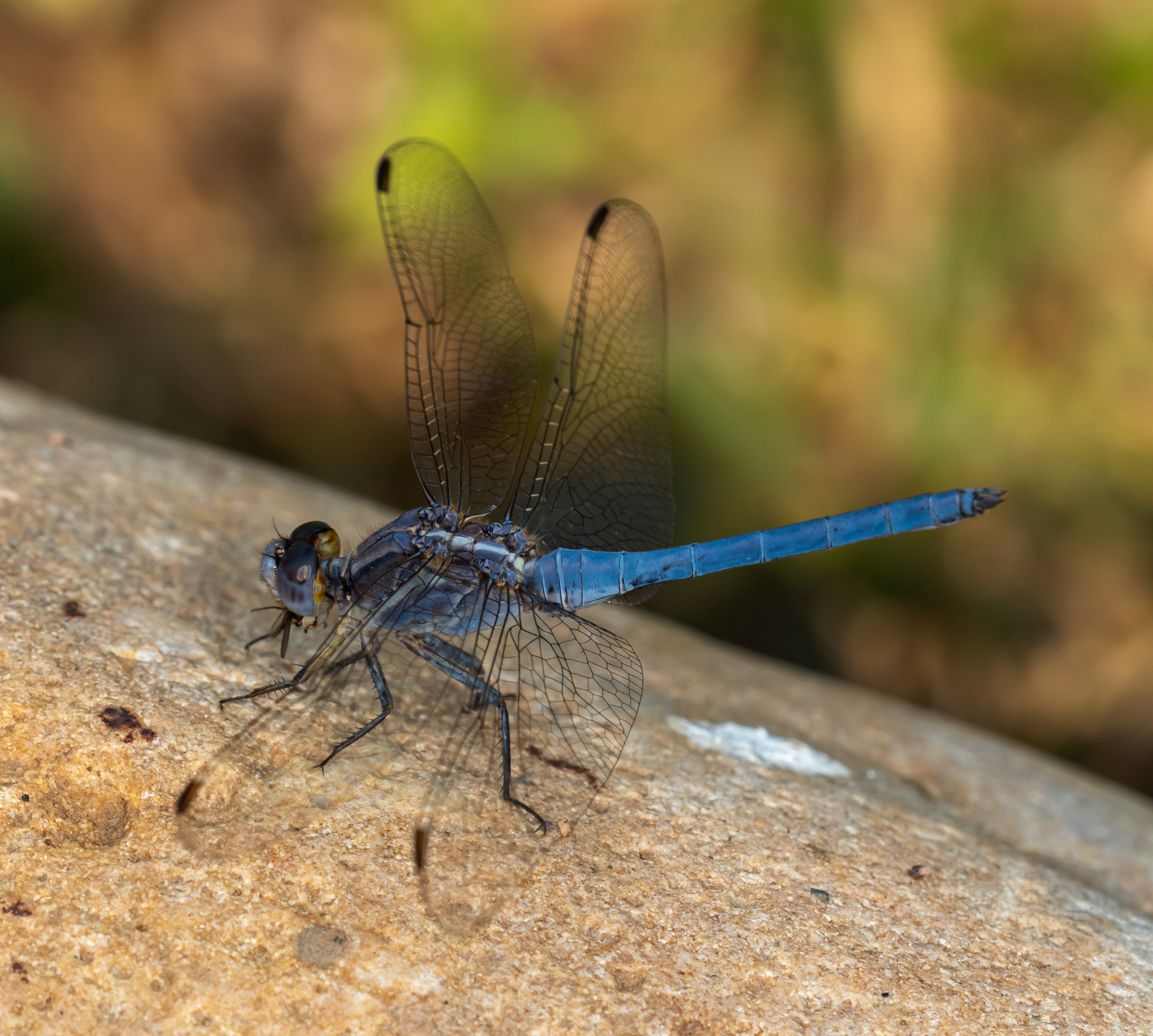
Male

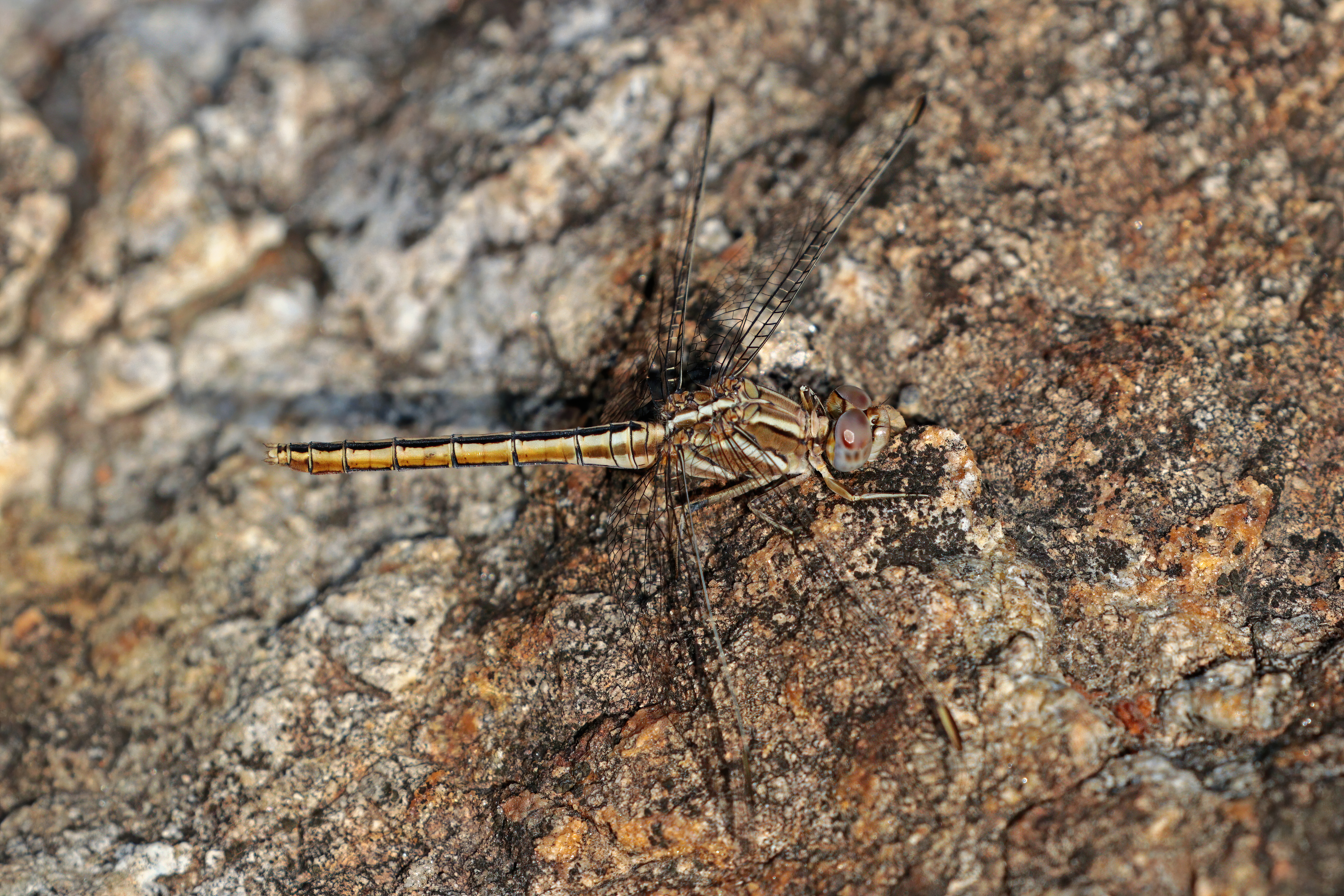
Female

==== Species: Pantala flavescens - wandering glider ====
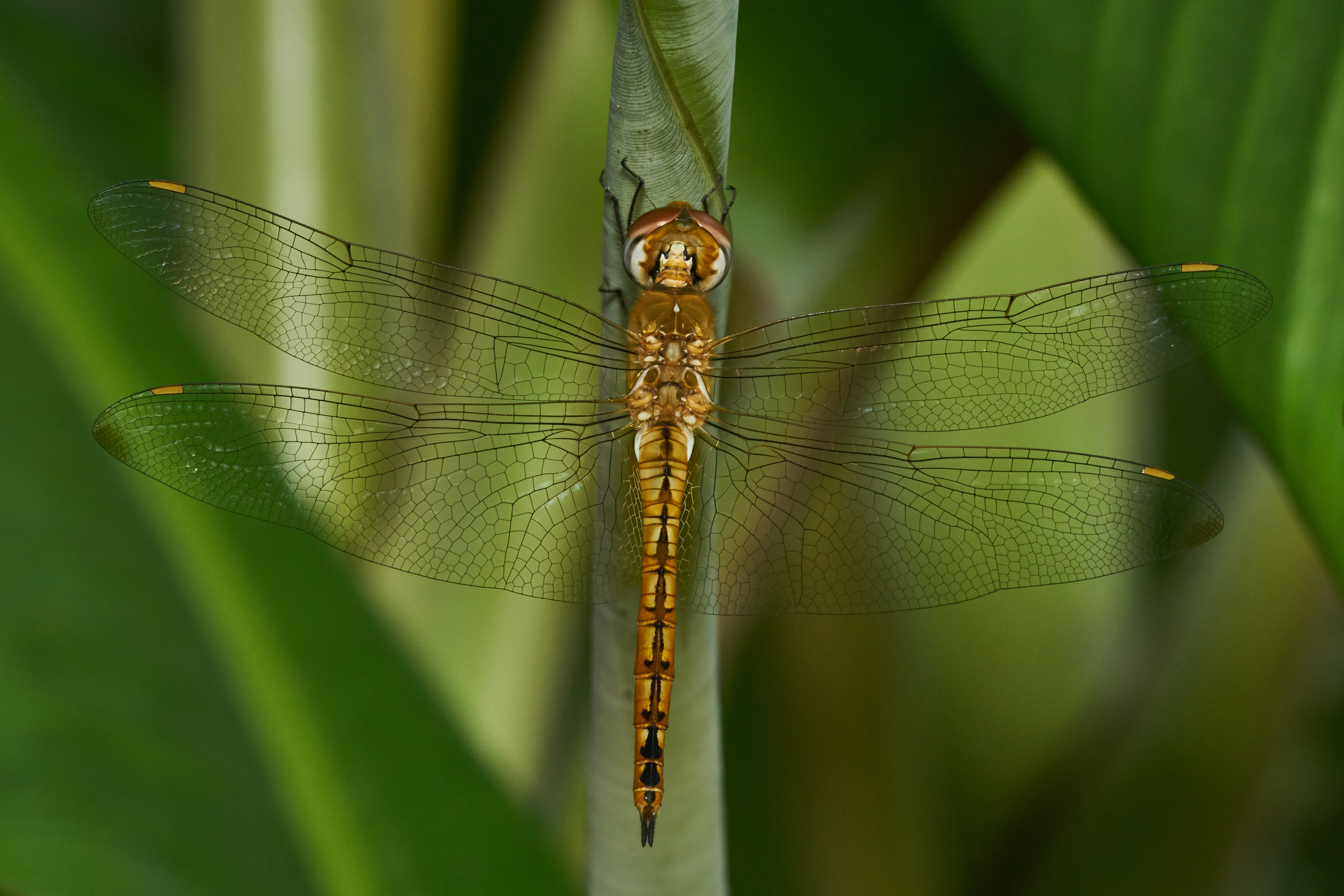
Male

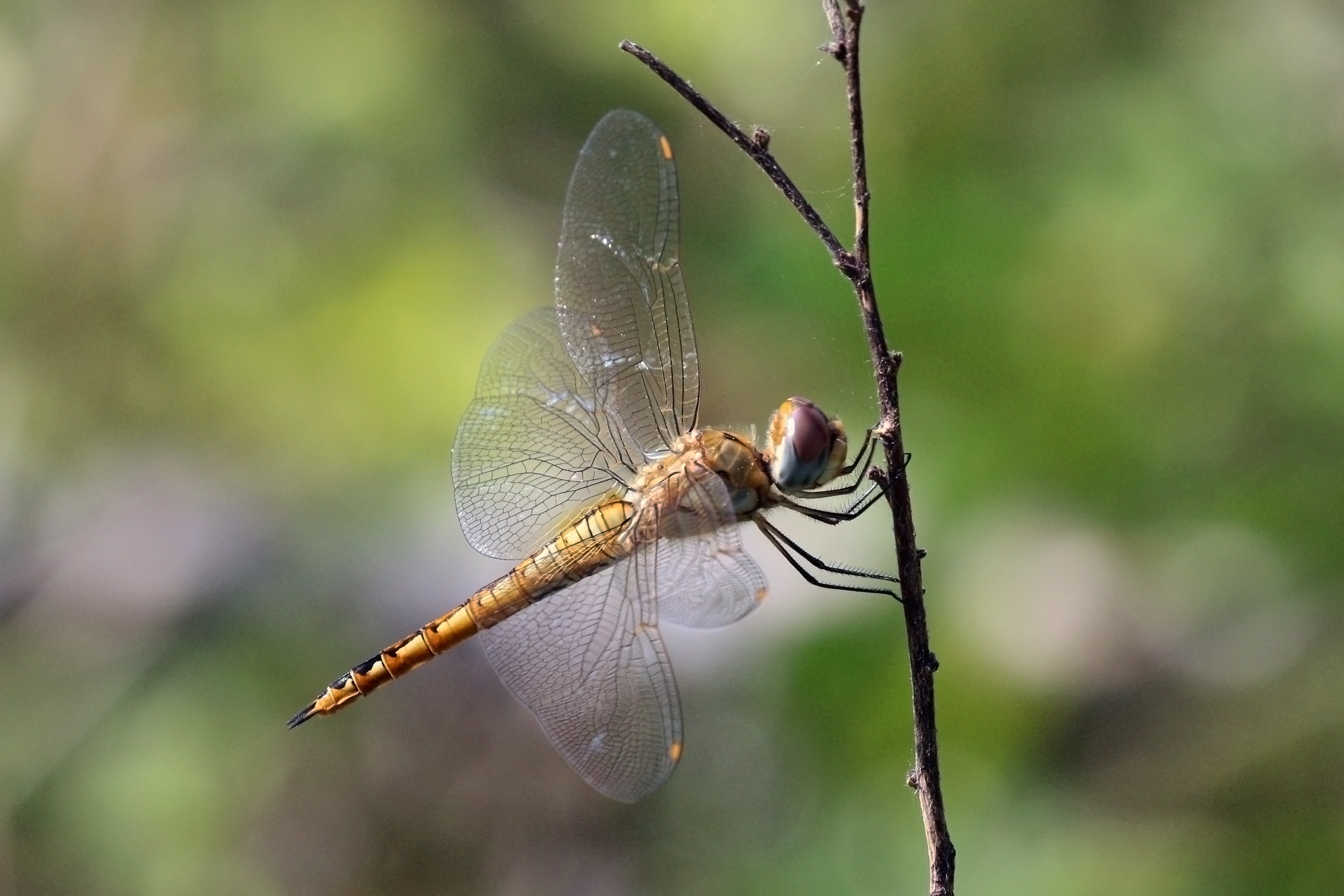
Female

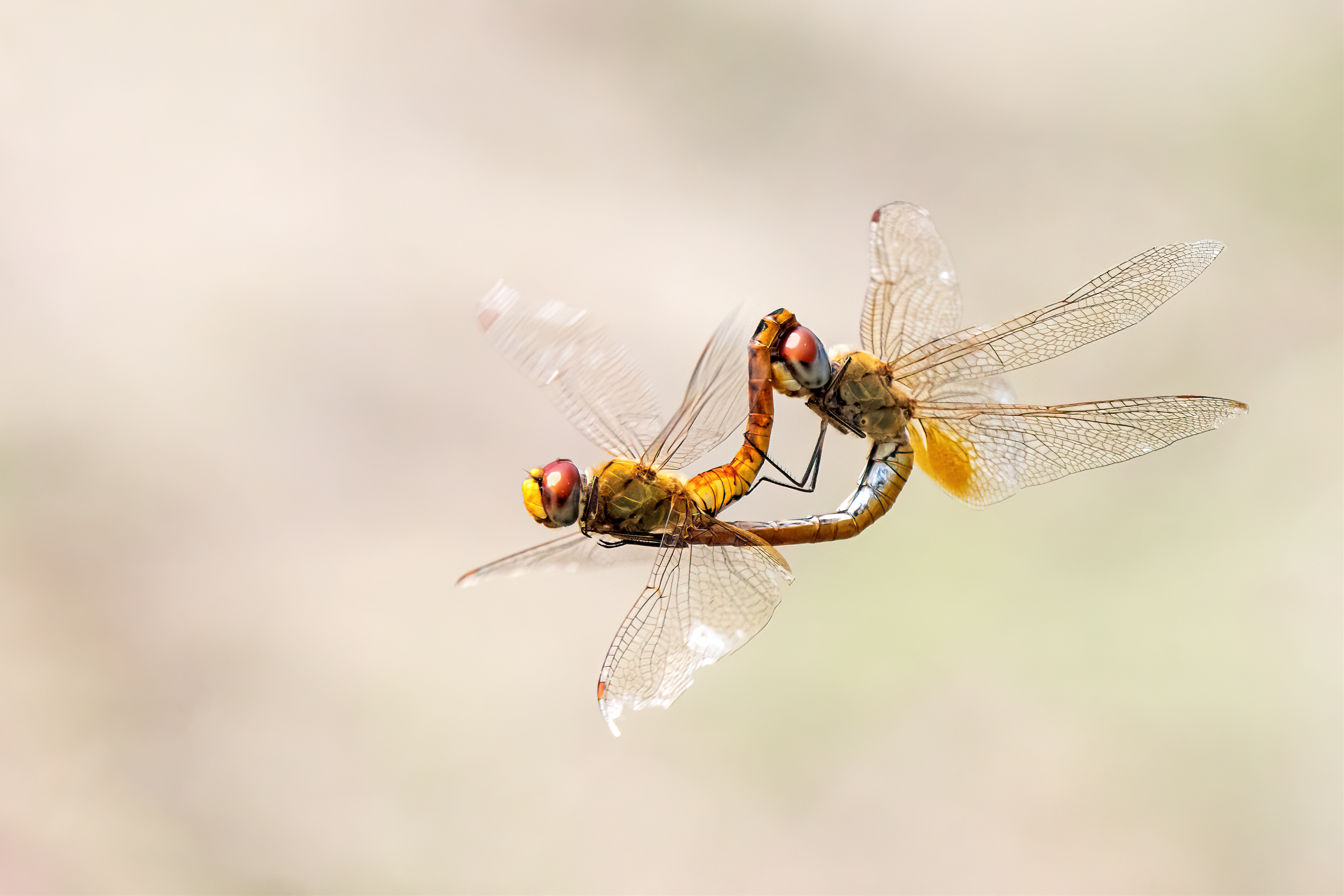
Mating

==== Species: Potamarcha congener - swampwatcher ====
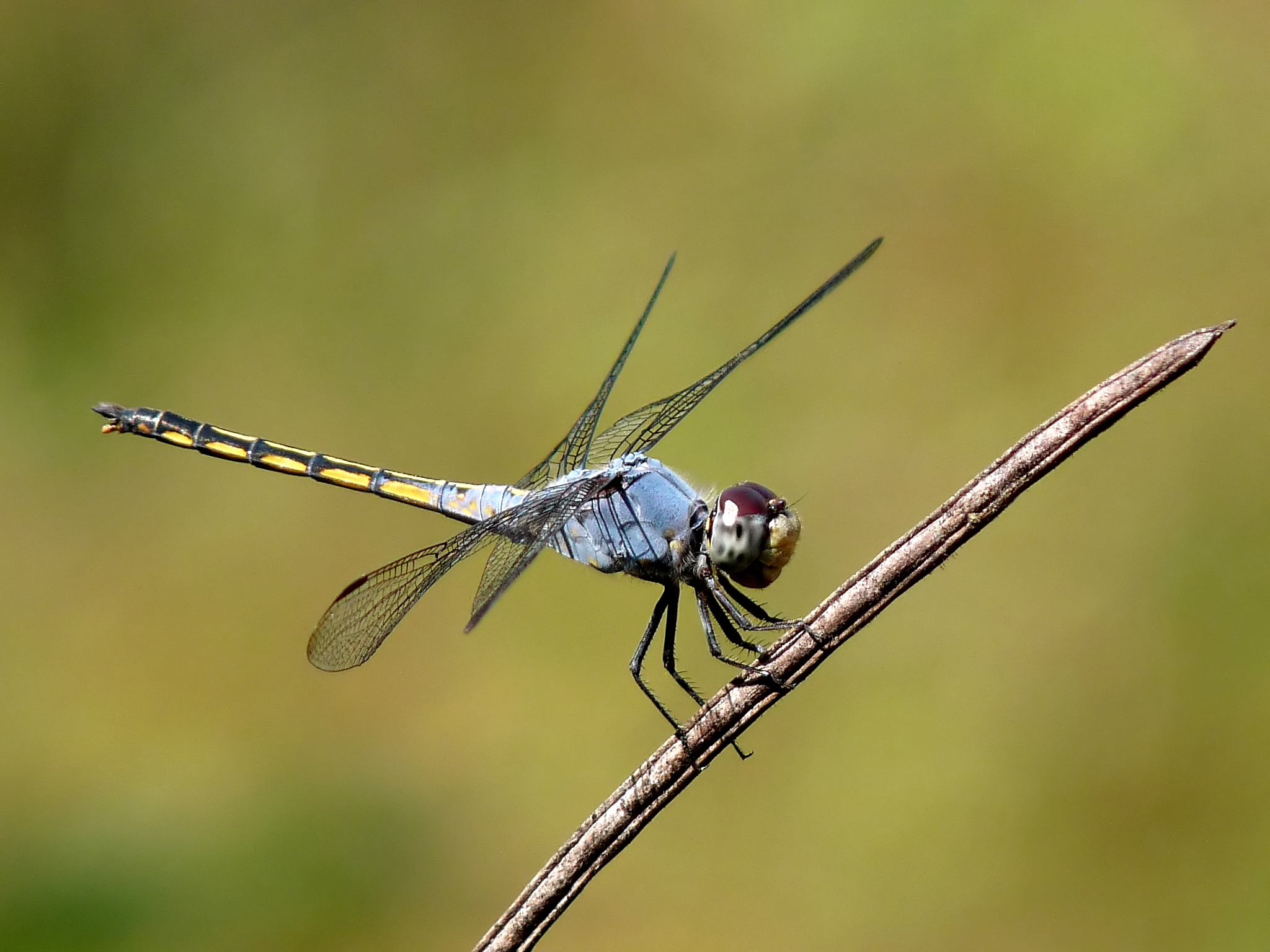
Male

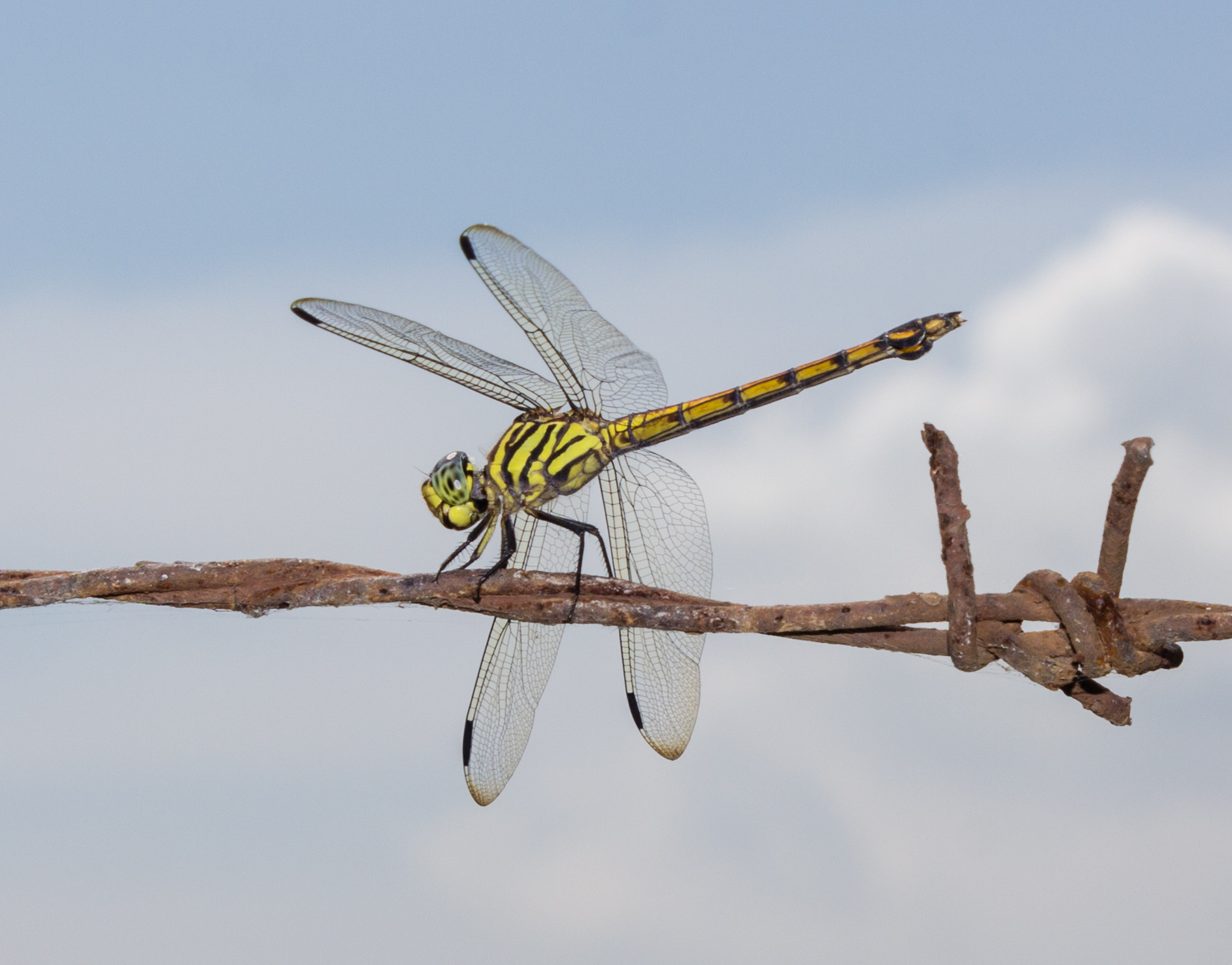
Female

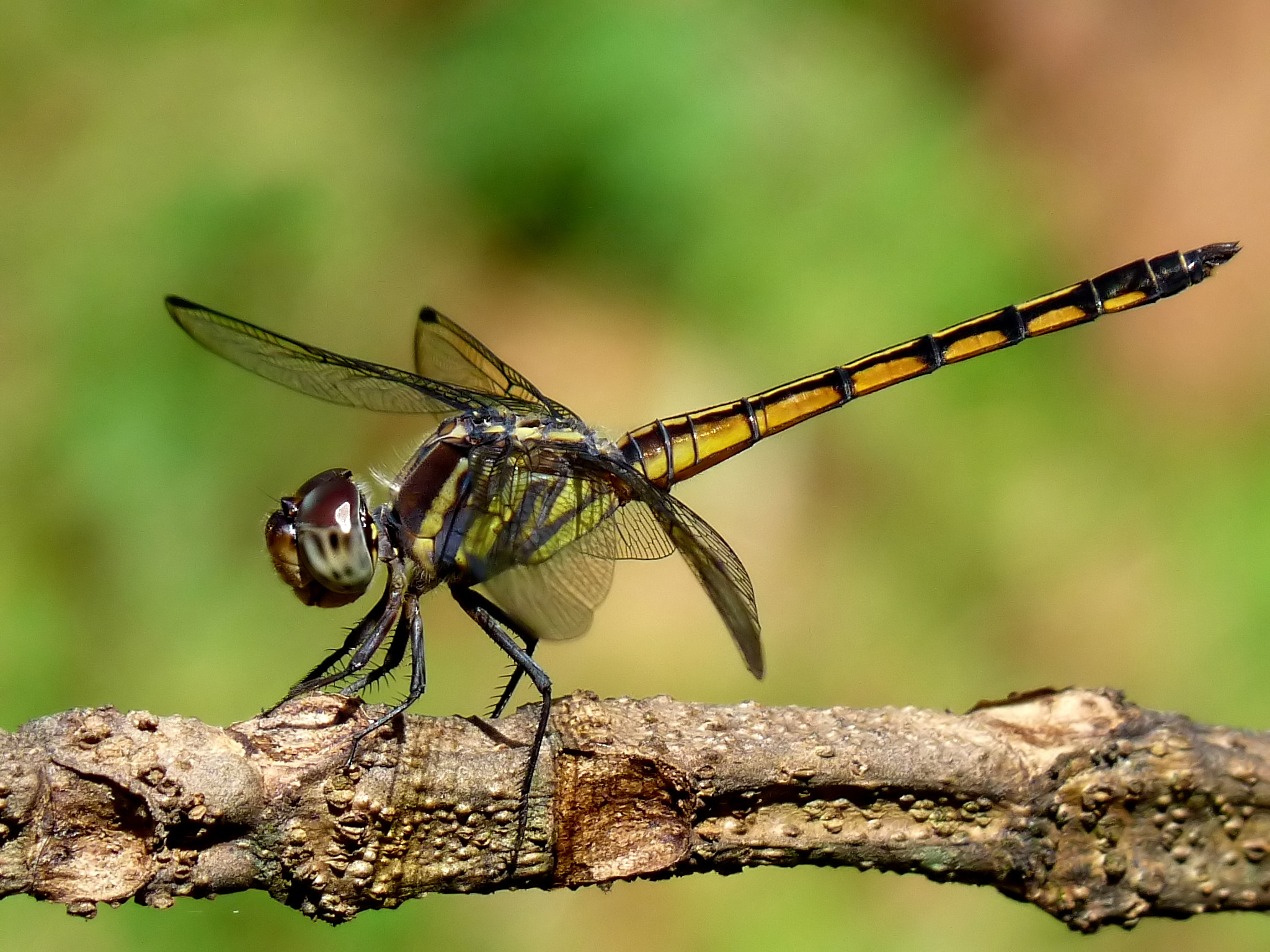
Immature male

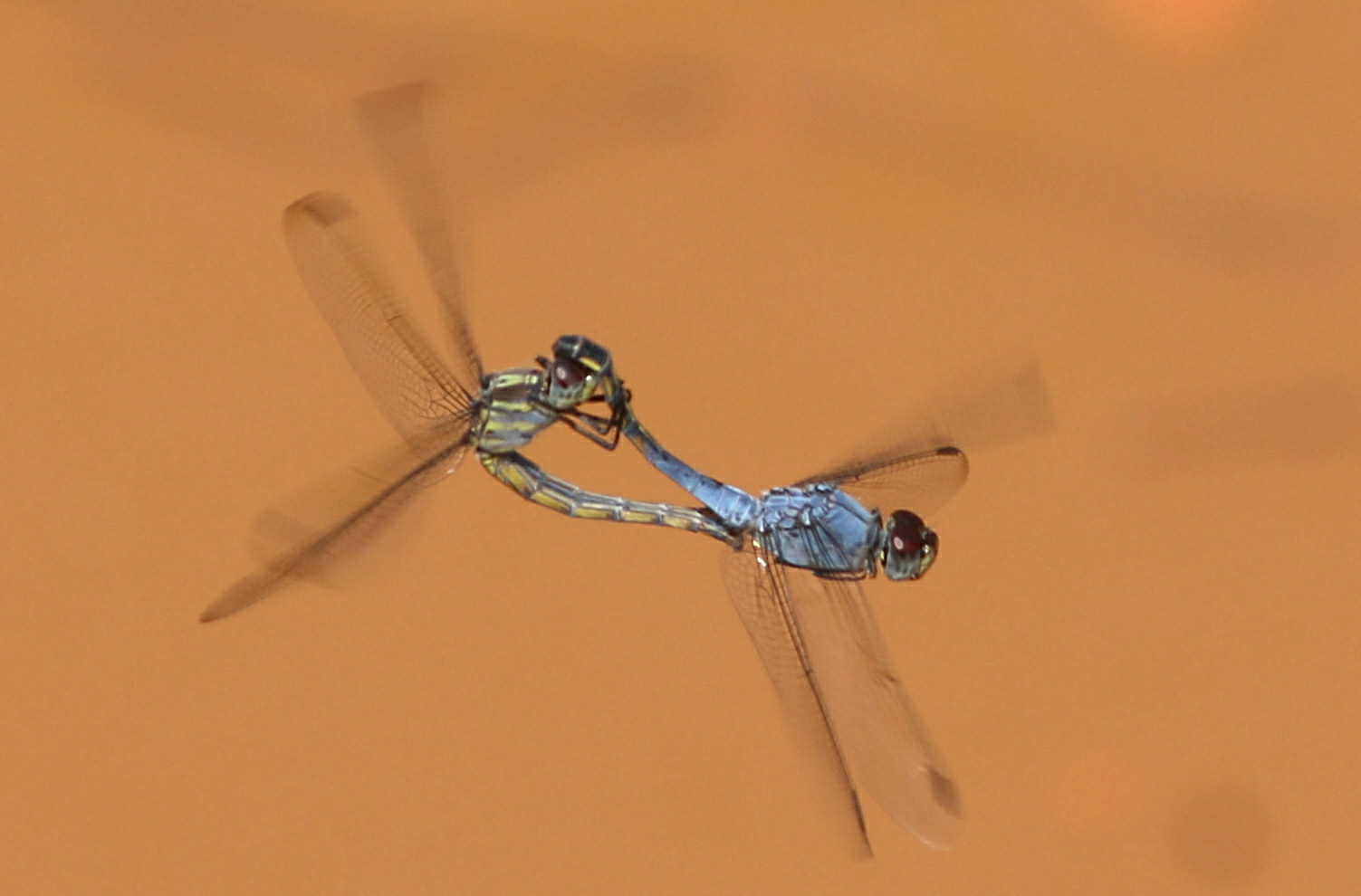
Mating

==== Species: Rhyothemis variegata - common picturewing ====
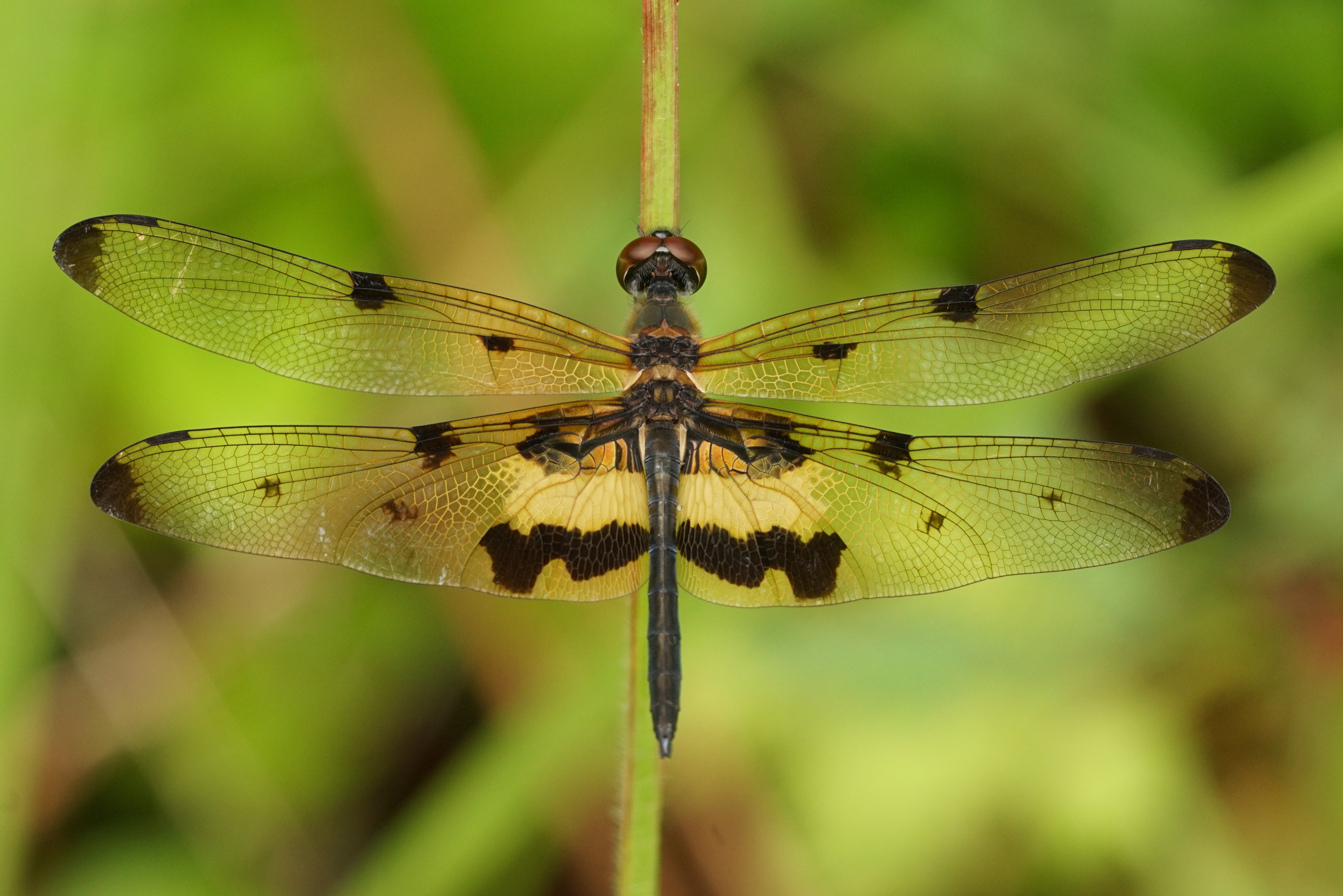
Male

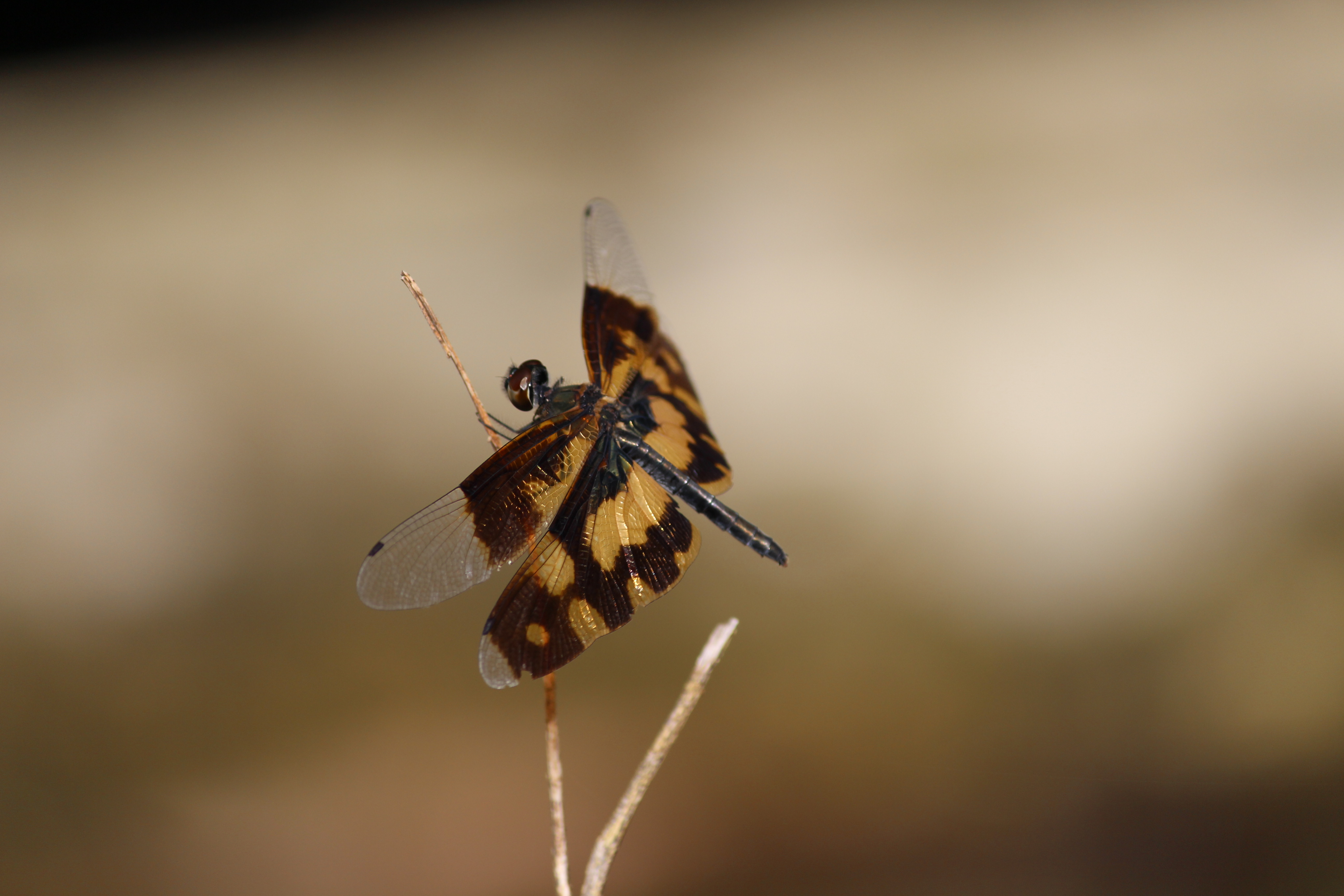
Female

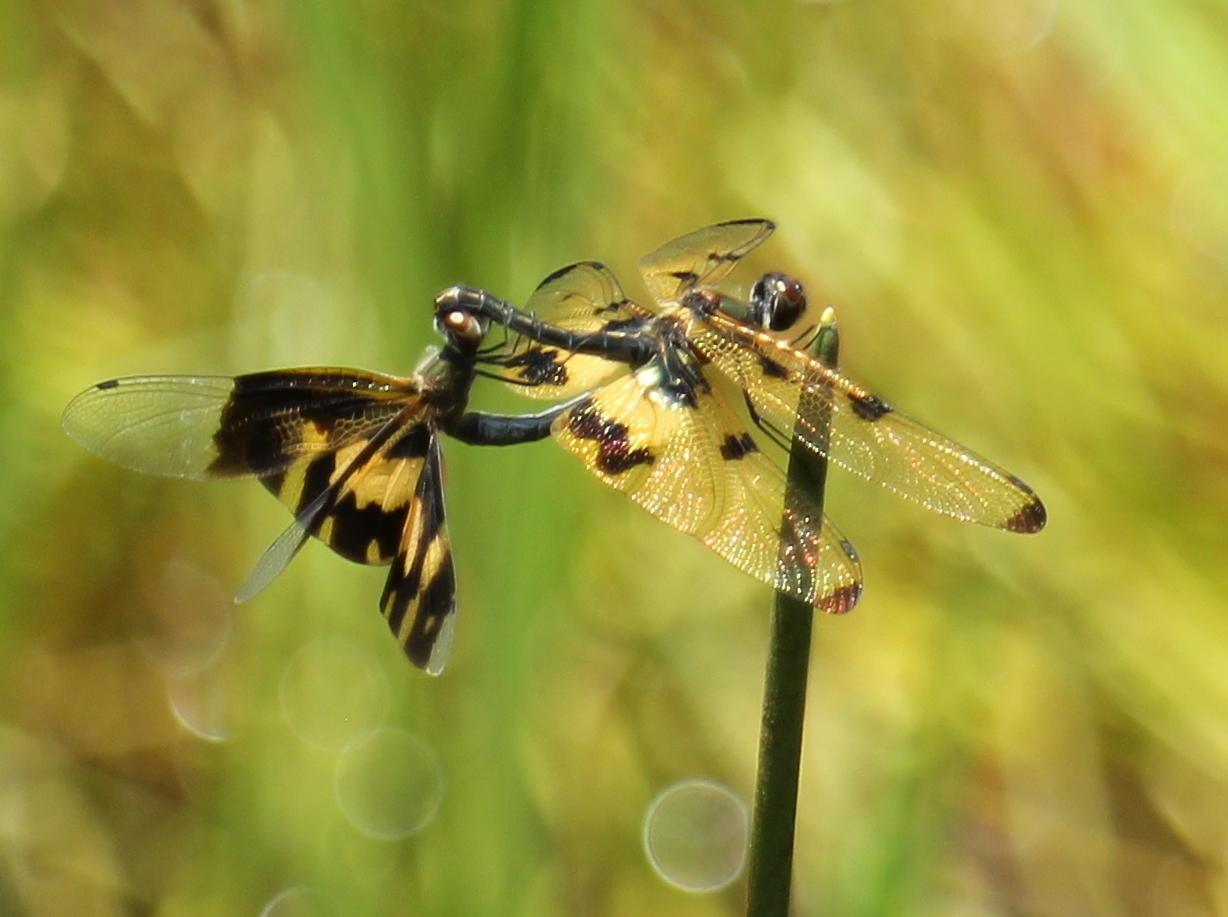
Mating

==== Species: Tholymis tillarga - twister ====
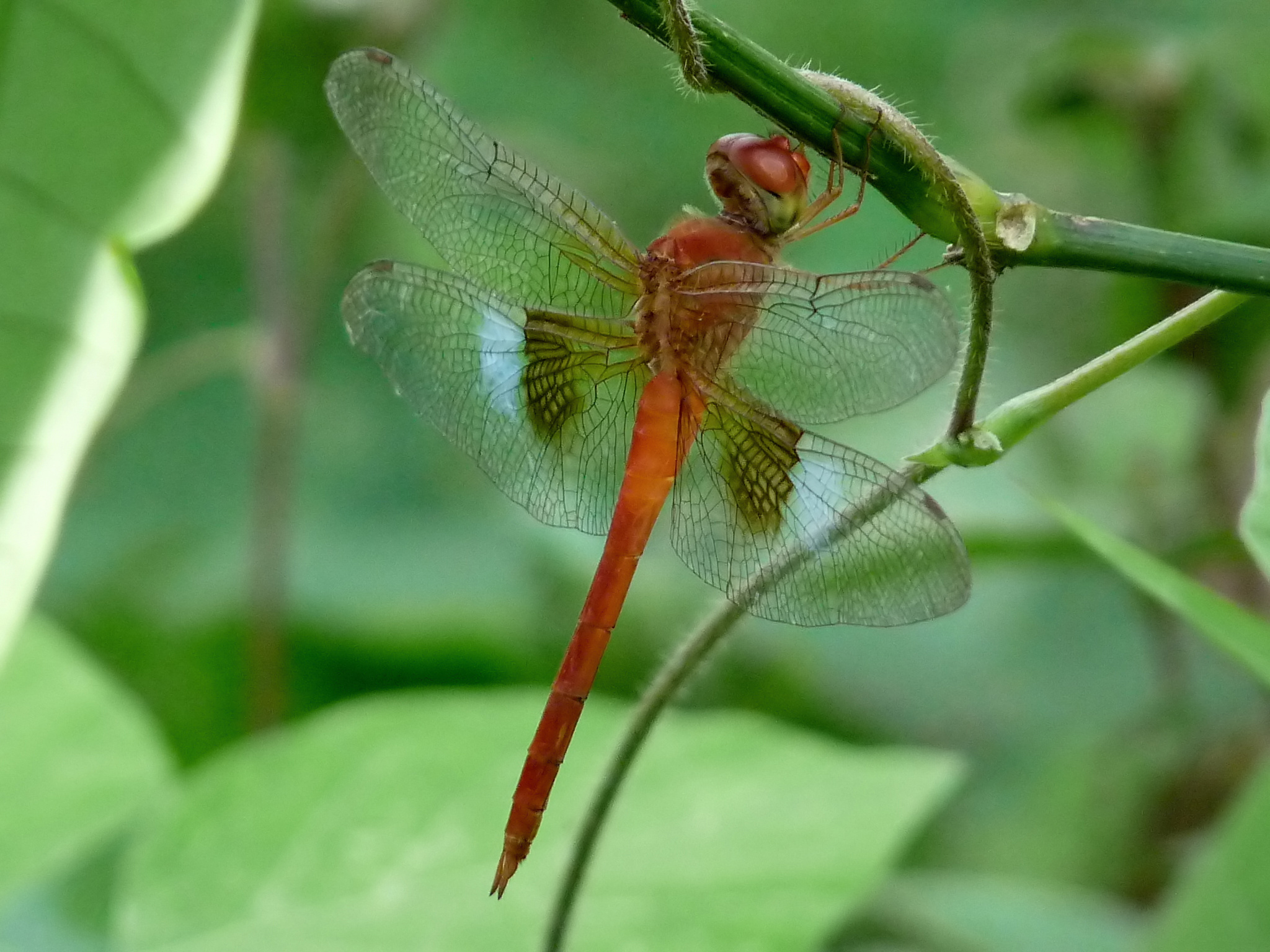
Male

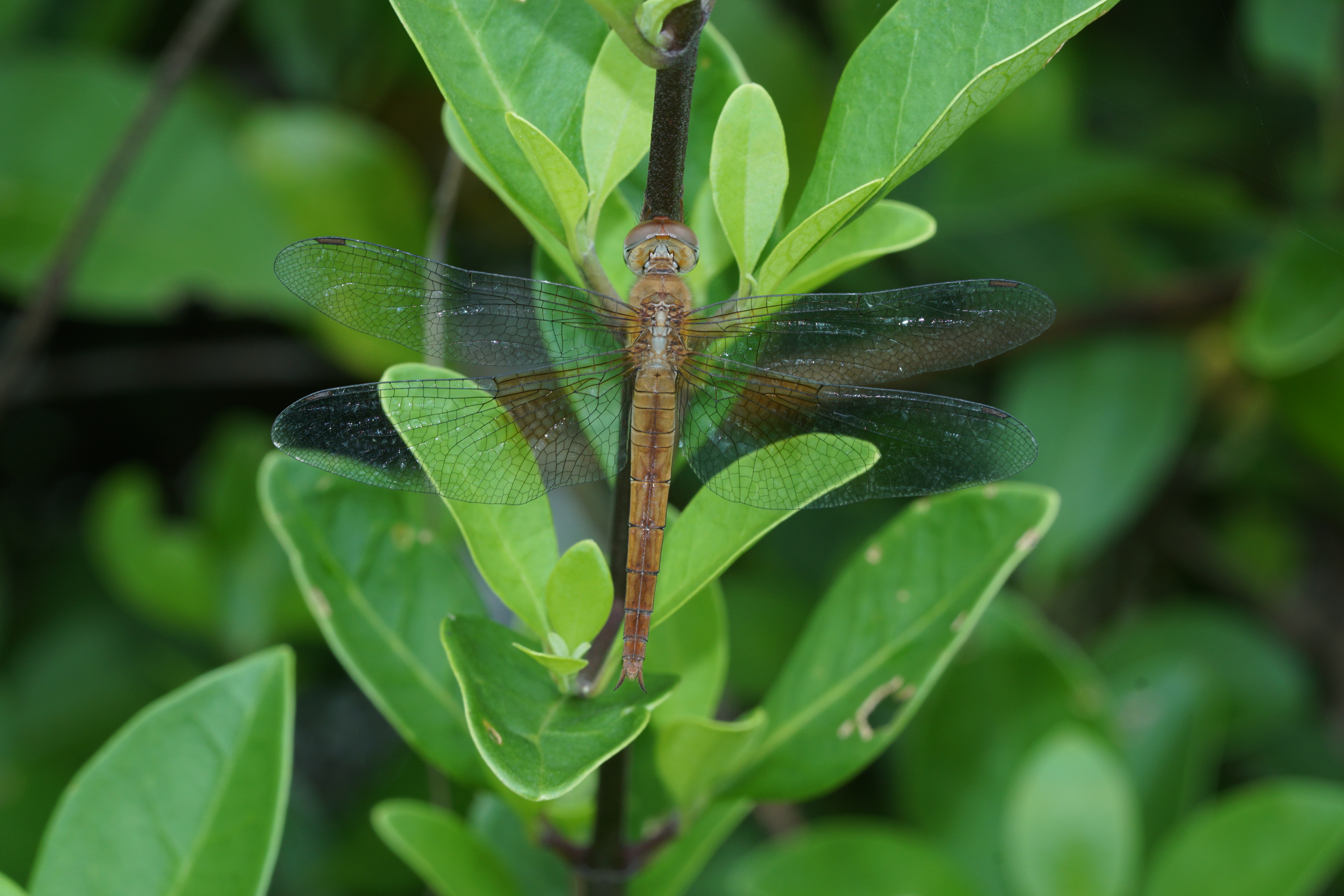
Female

==== Species: Tramea basilaris - keyhole glider ====
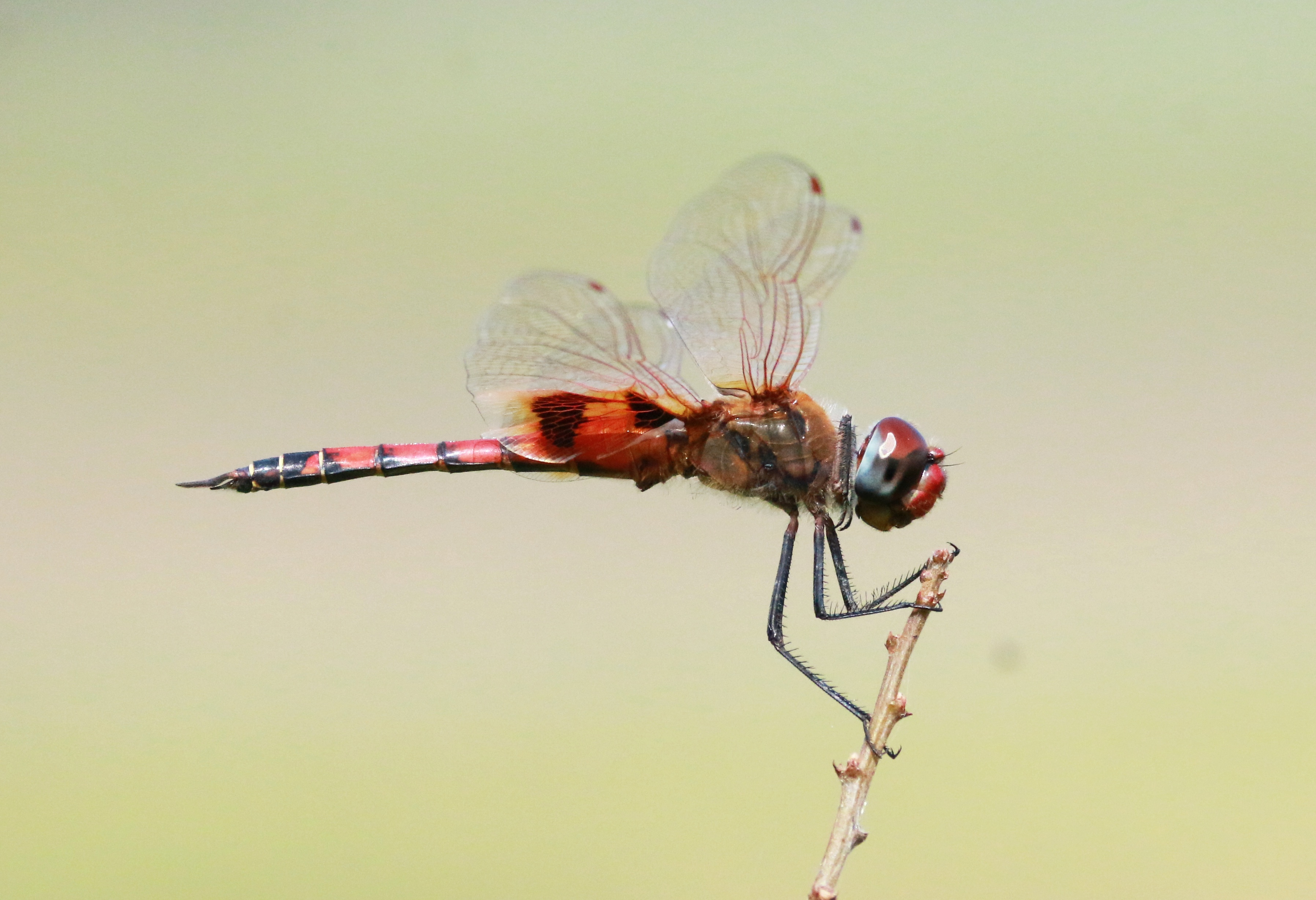
Male

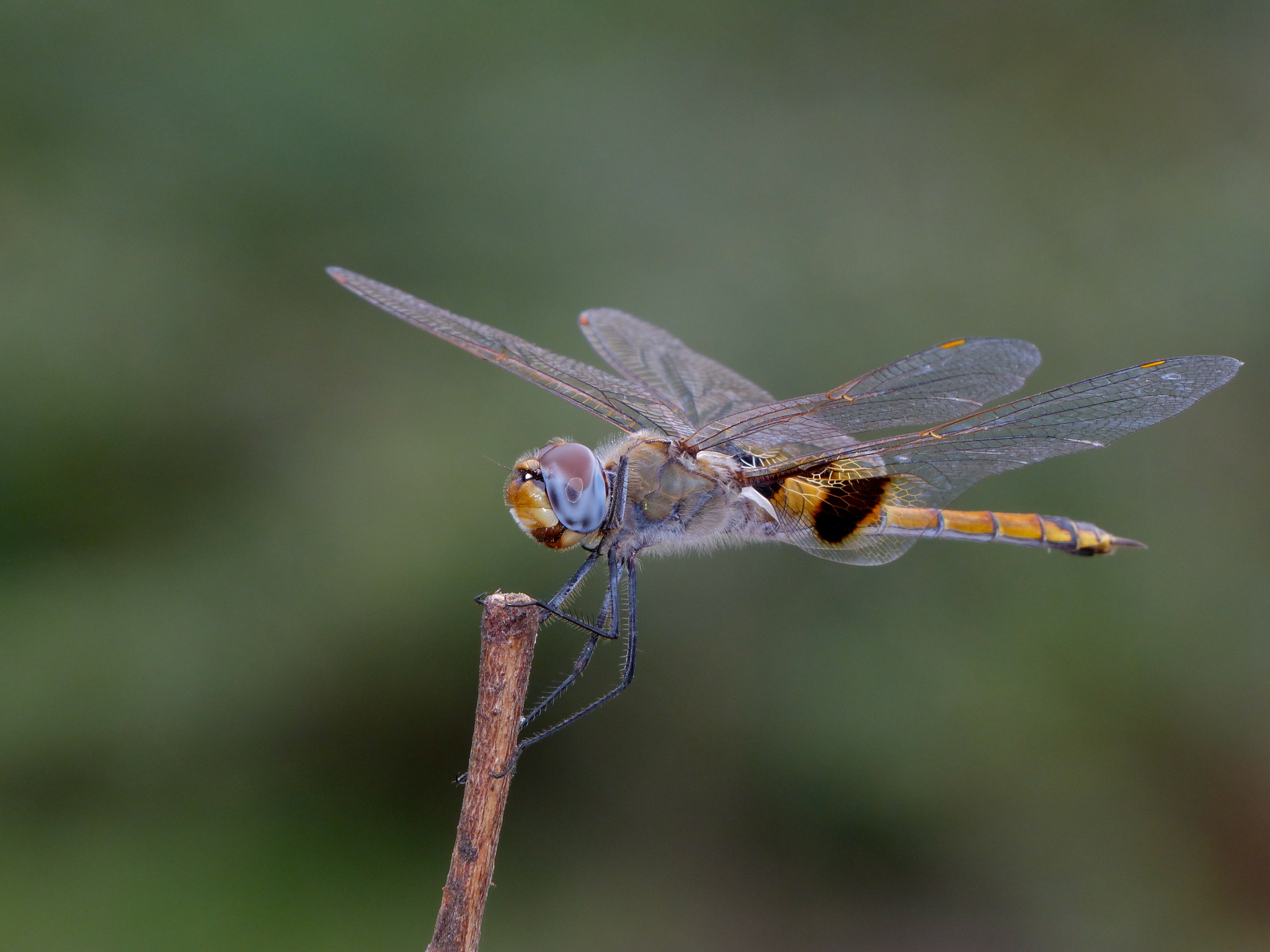
Female

==== Species: Tramea limbata - ferruginous glider ====
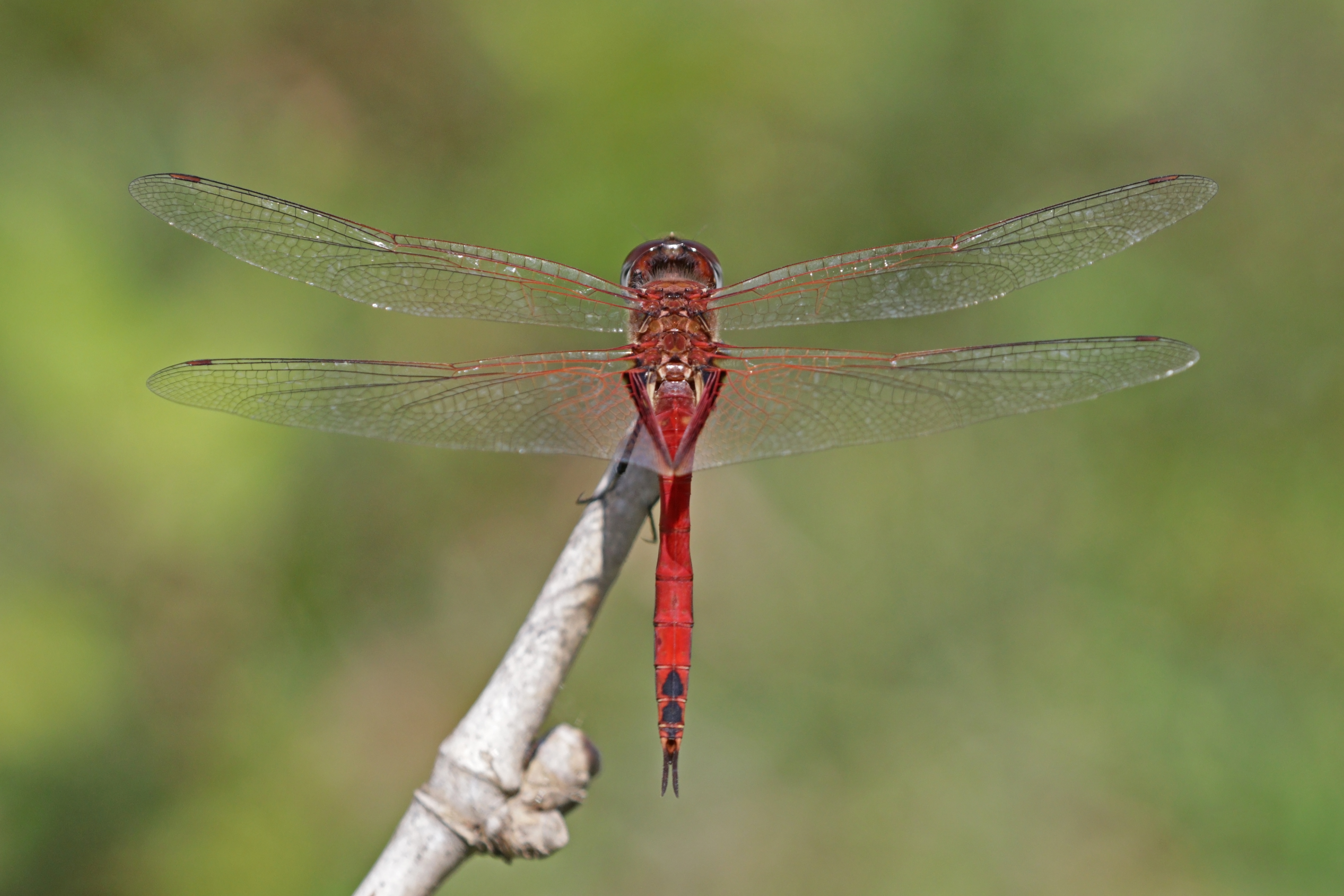
Male

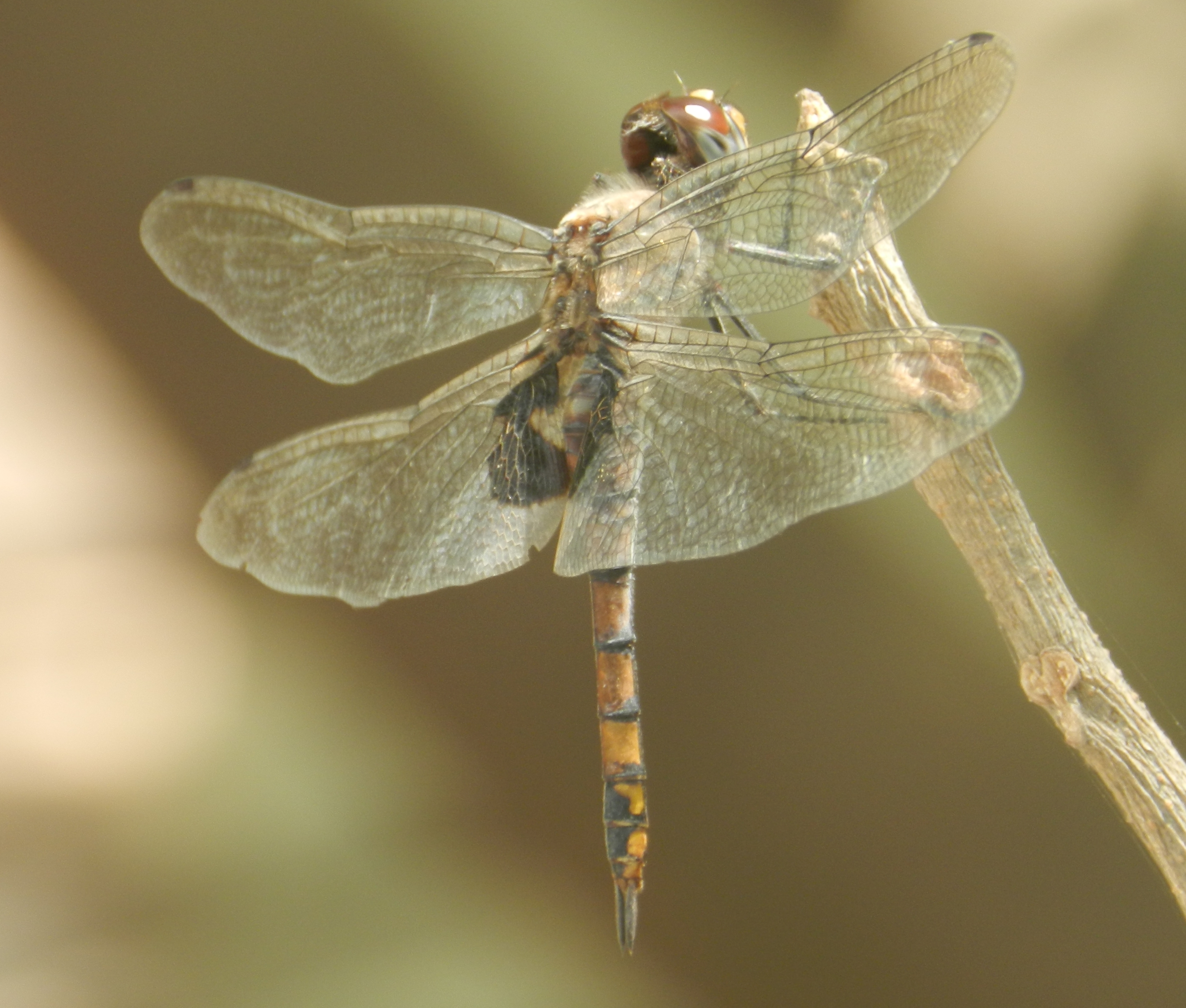
Female

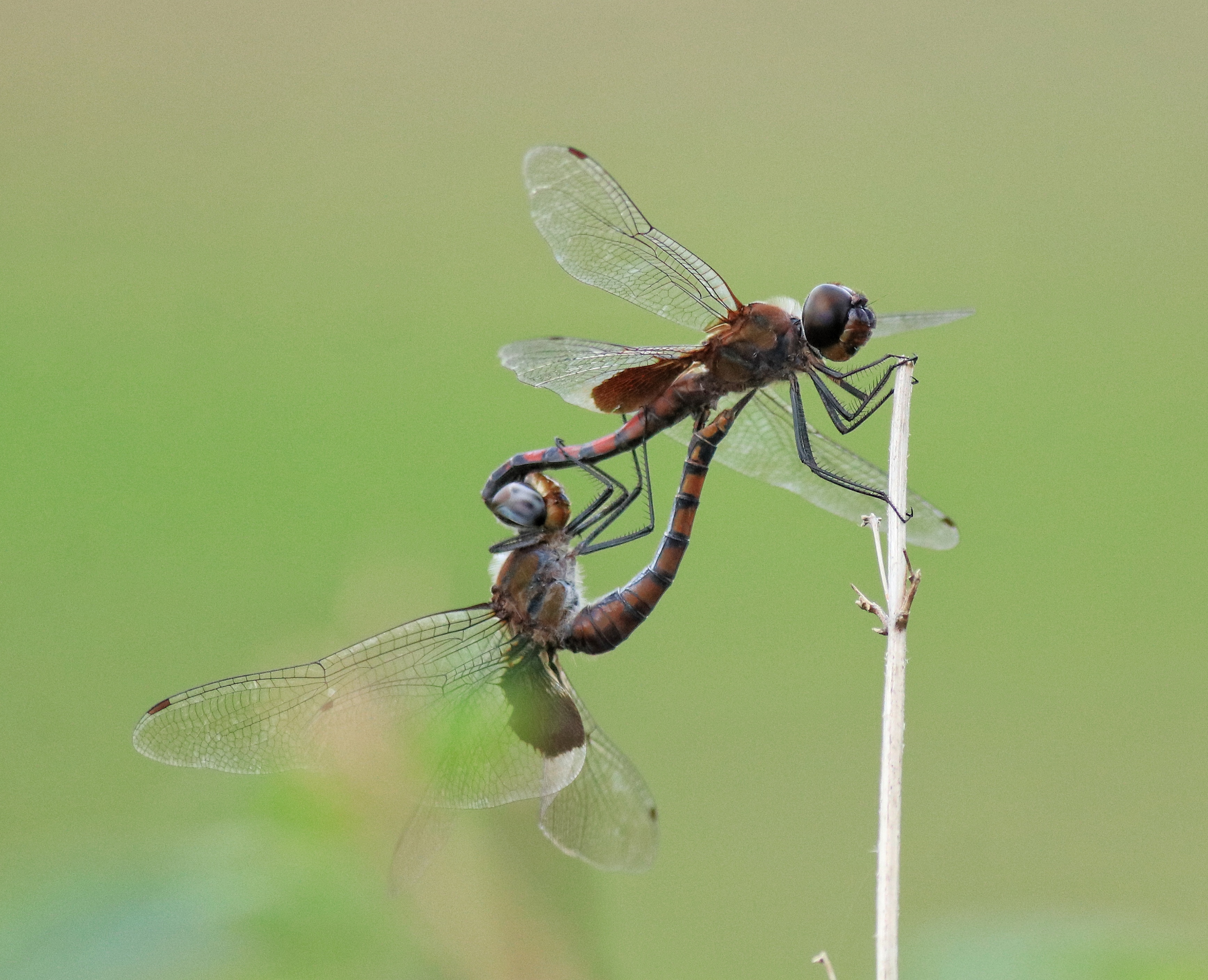
Mating

==== Species: Trithemis aurora - crimson marsh glider ====
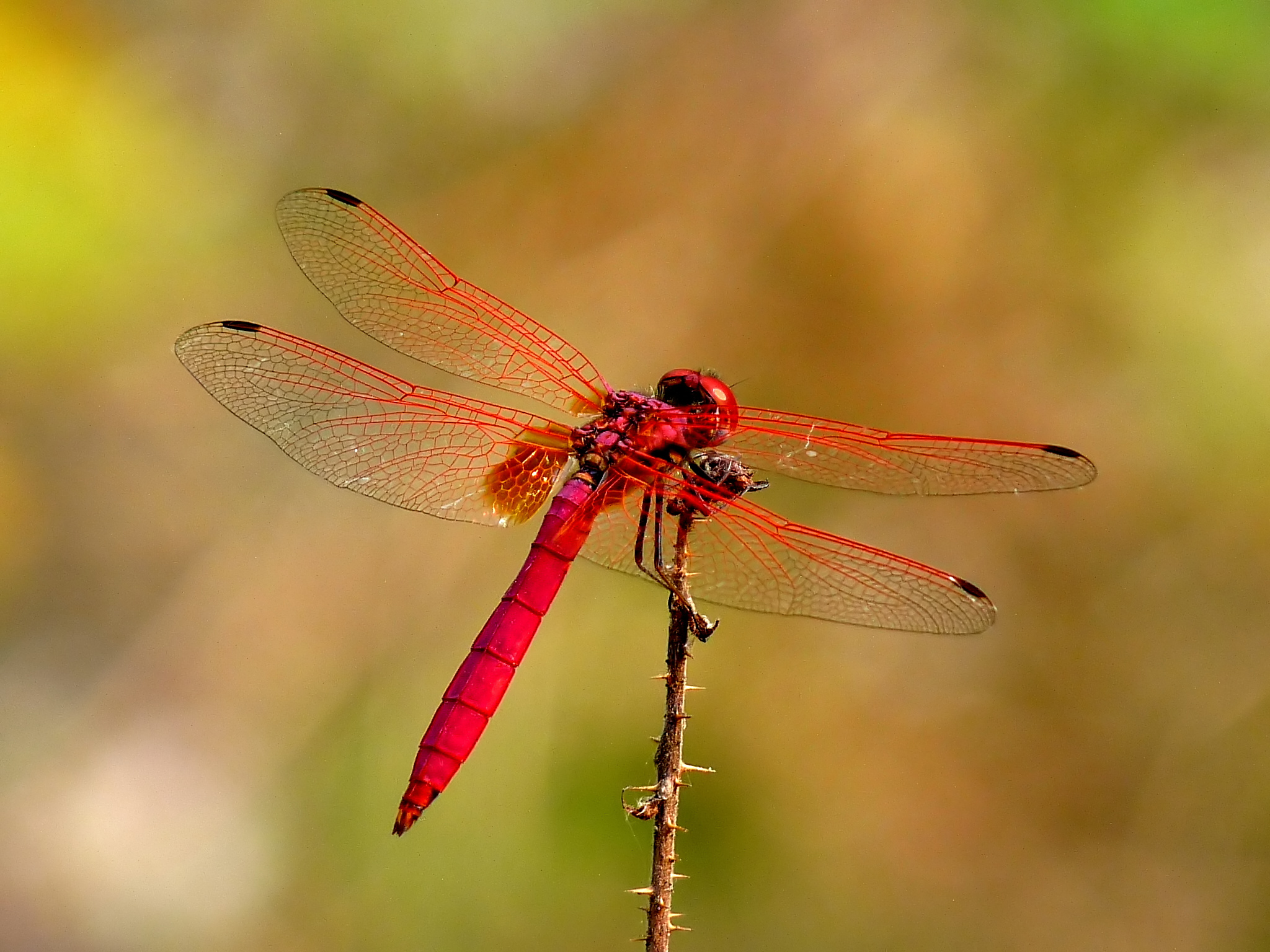
Male

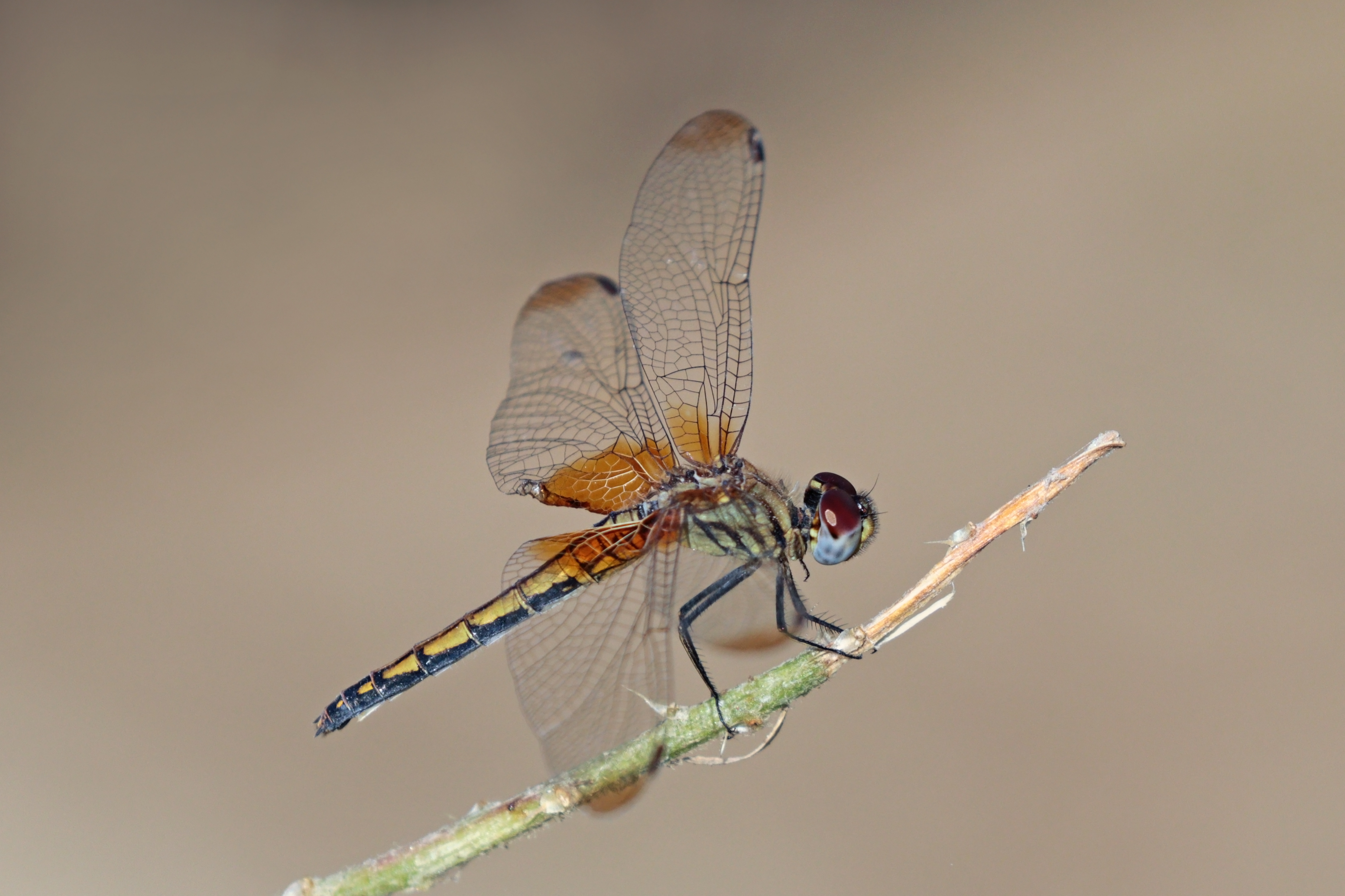
Female

==== Species: Trithemis festiva - indigo dropwing ====
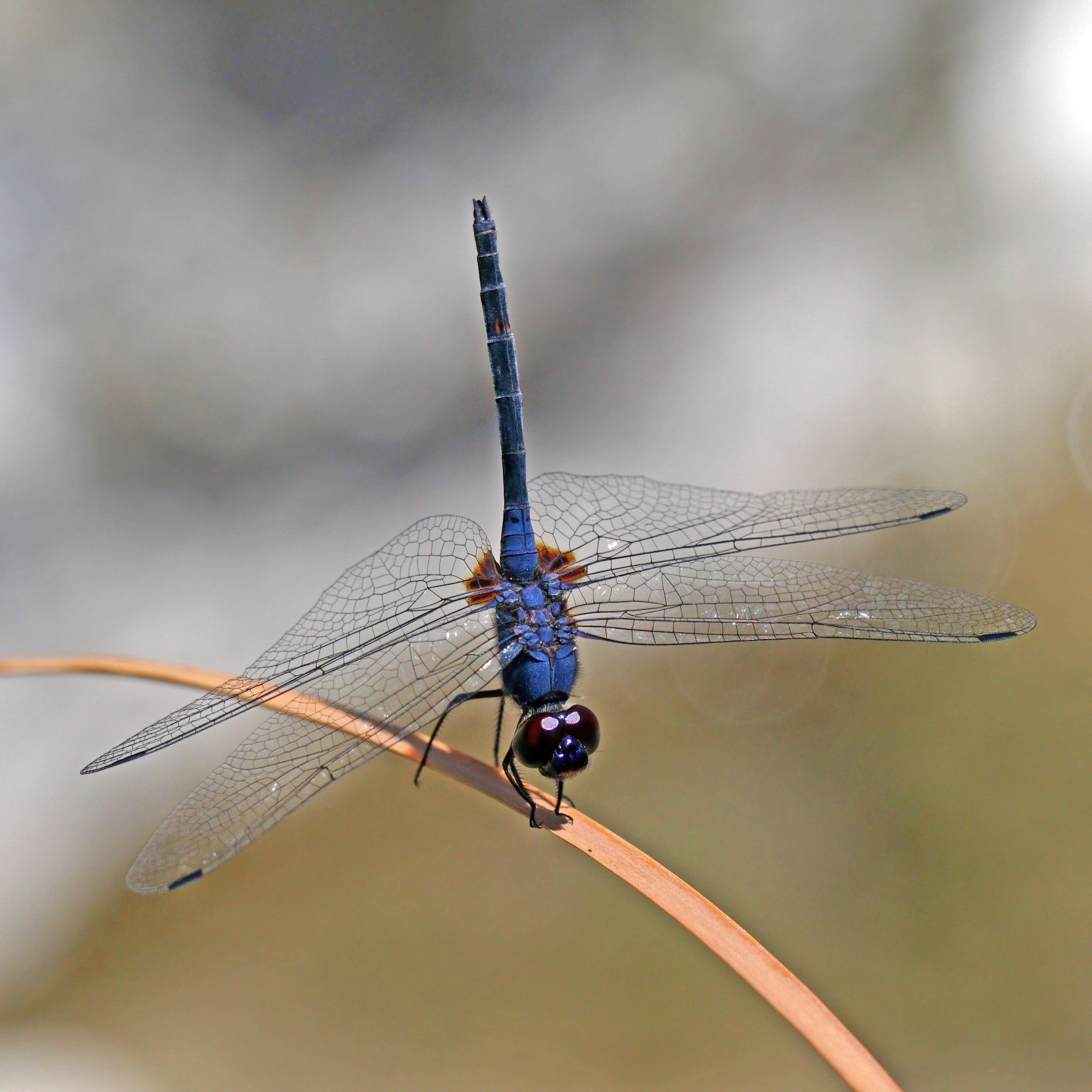
Male

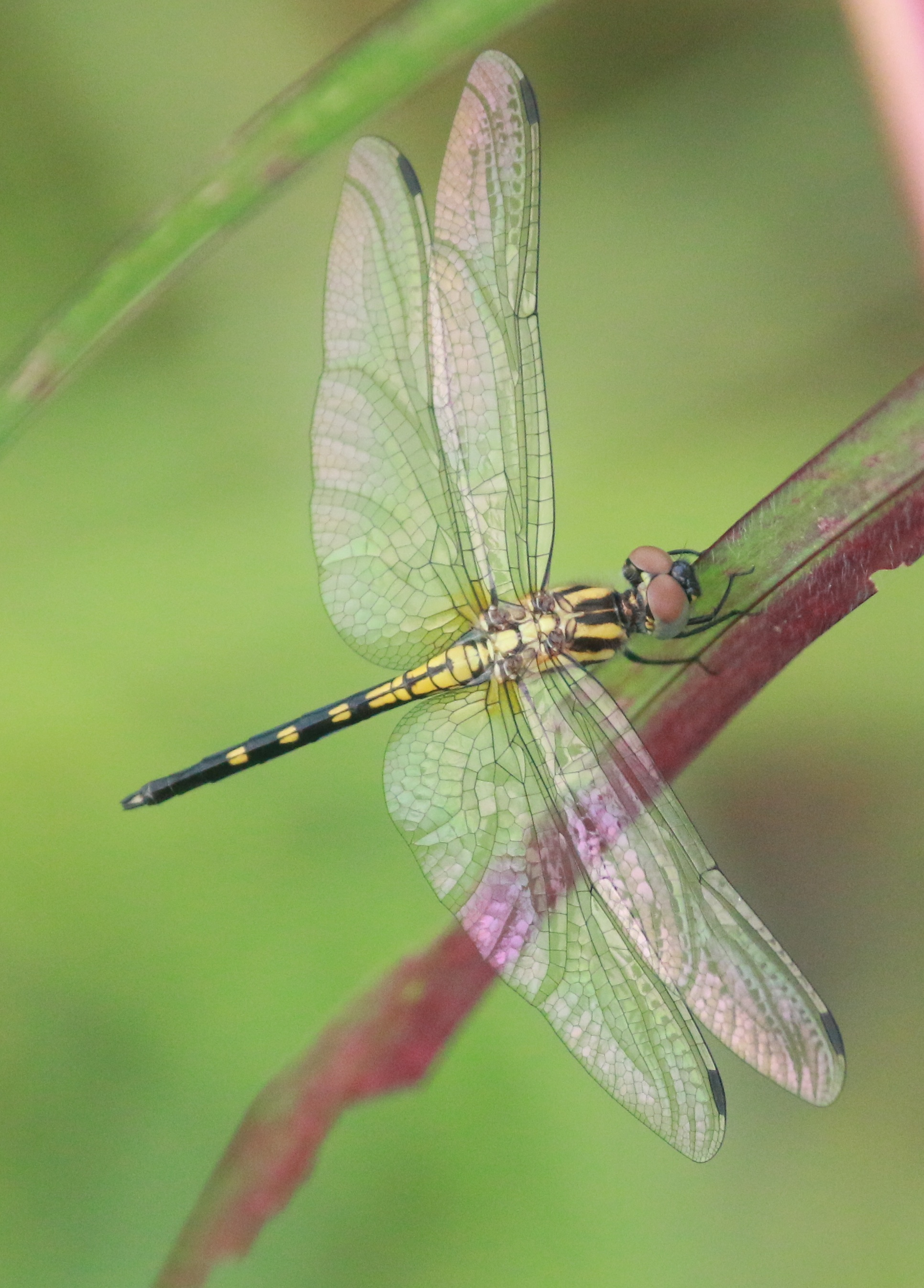
Female

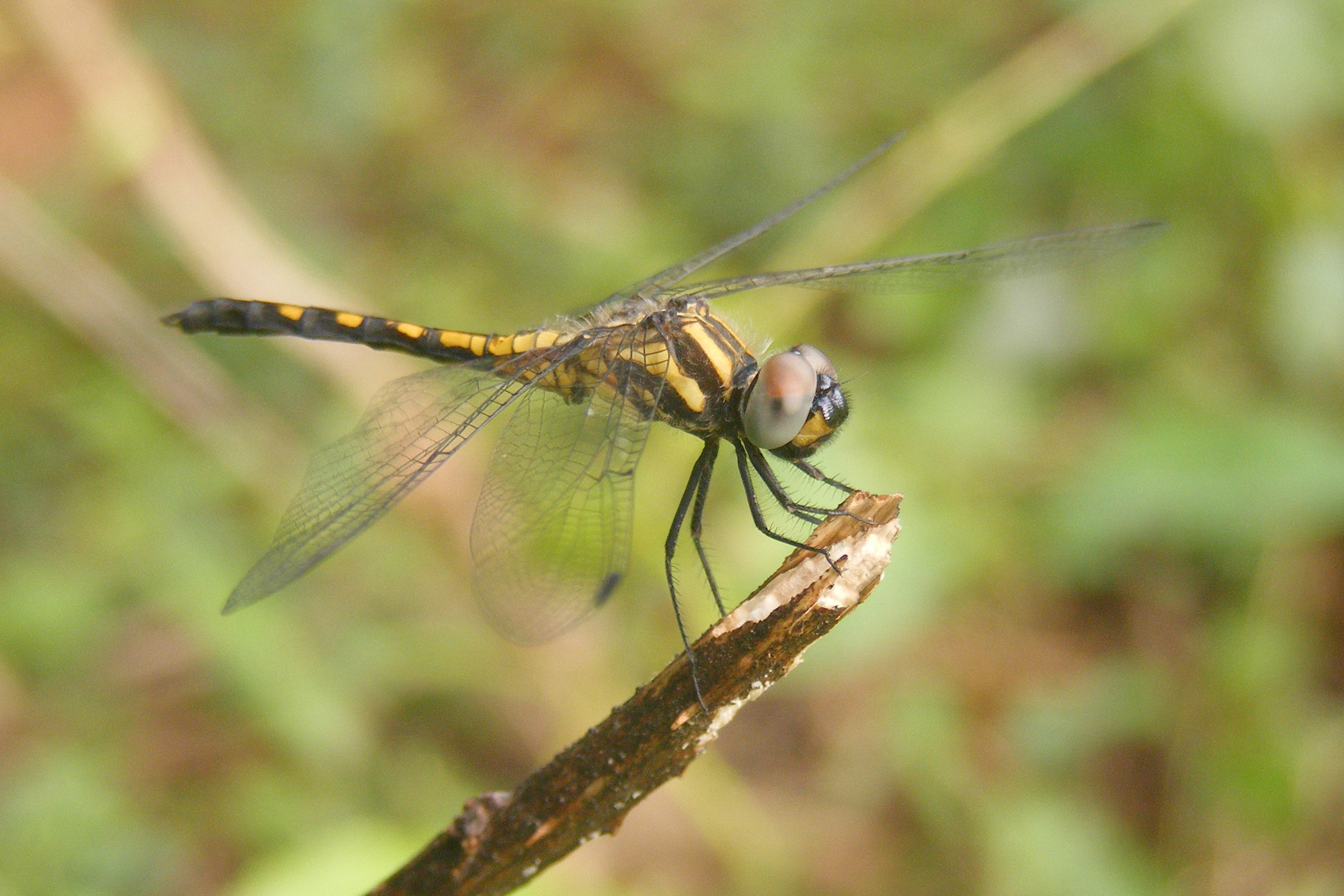
Juvenile

==== Species: Trithemis pallidinervis - dancing dropwing ====
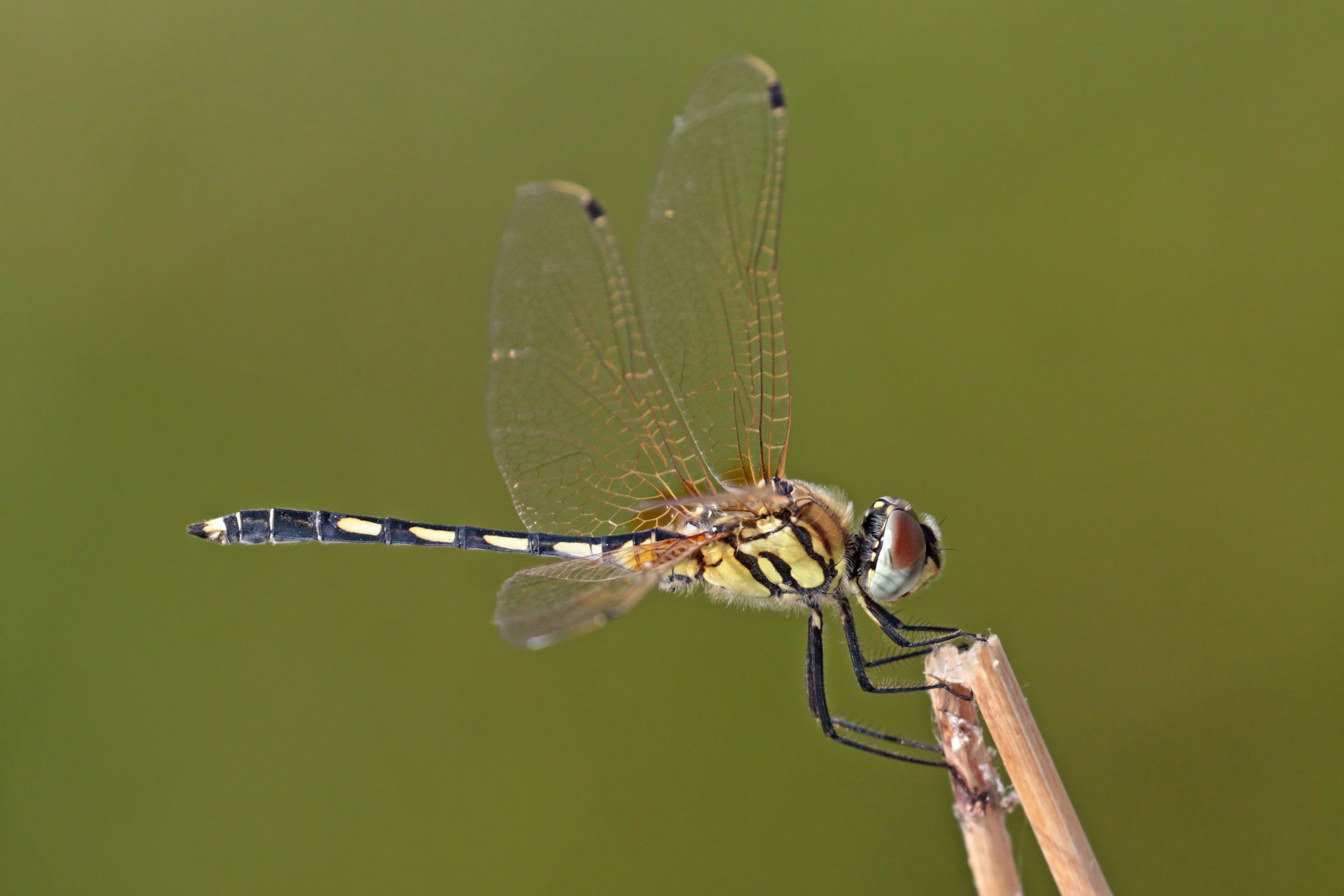
Male

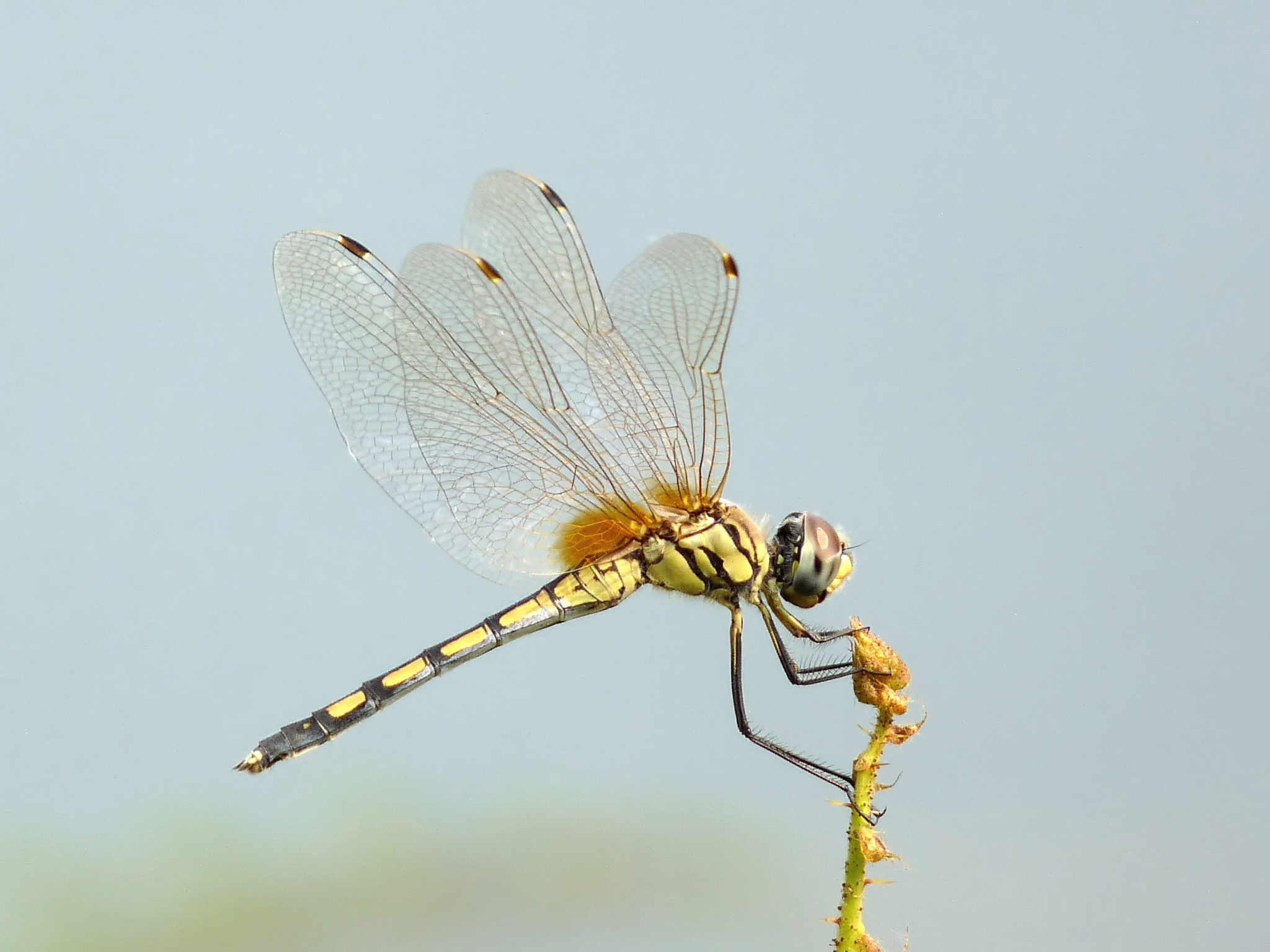
Female

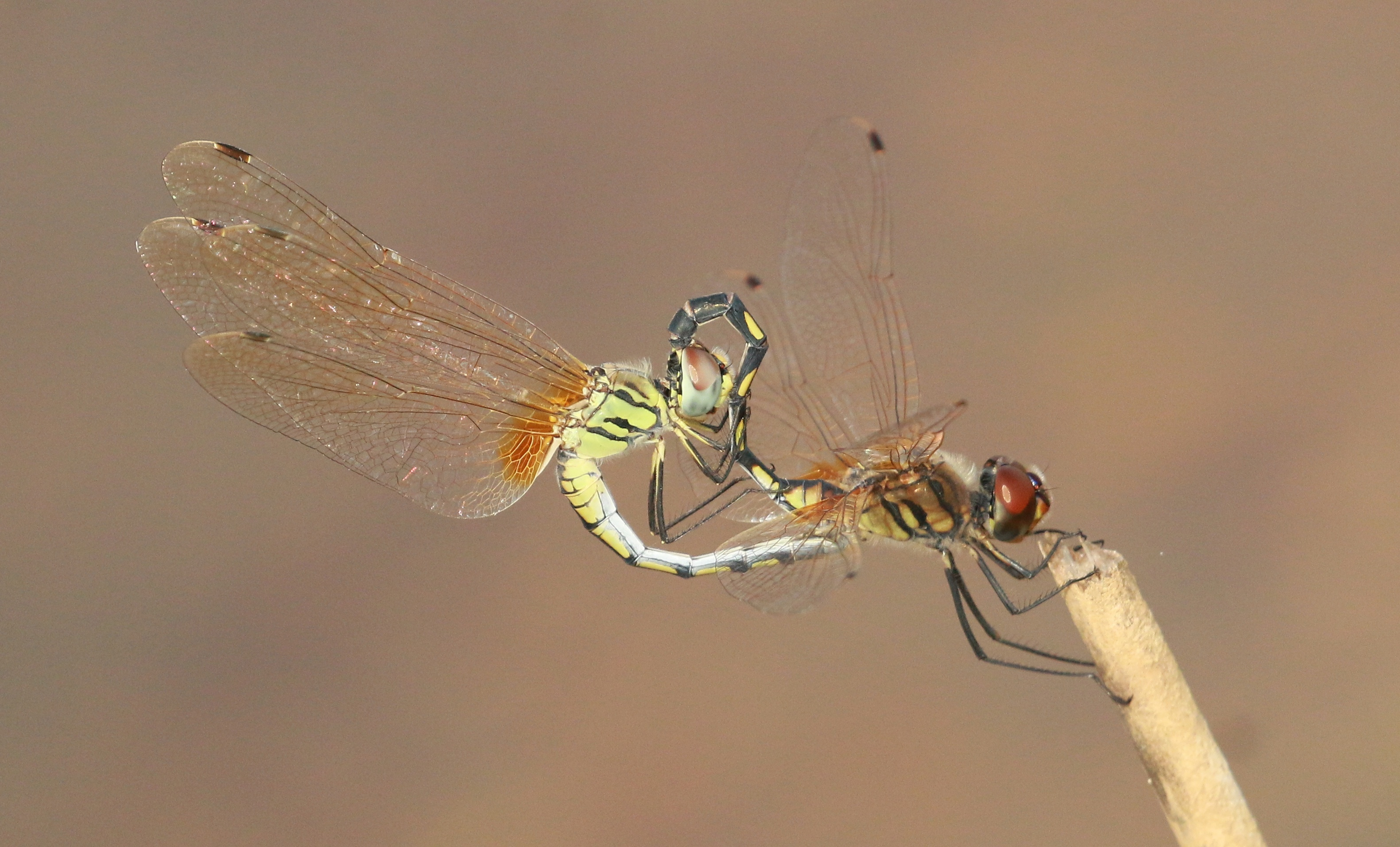
Mating

==== Species: Urothemis signata - scarlet basker ====
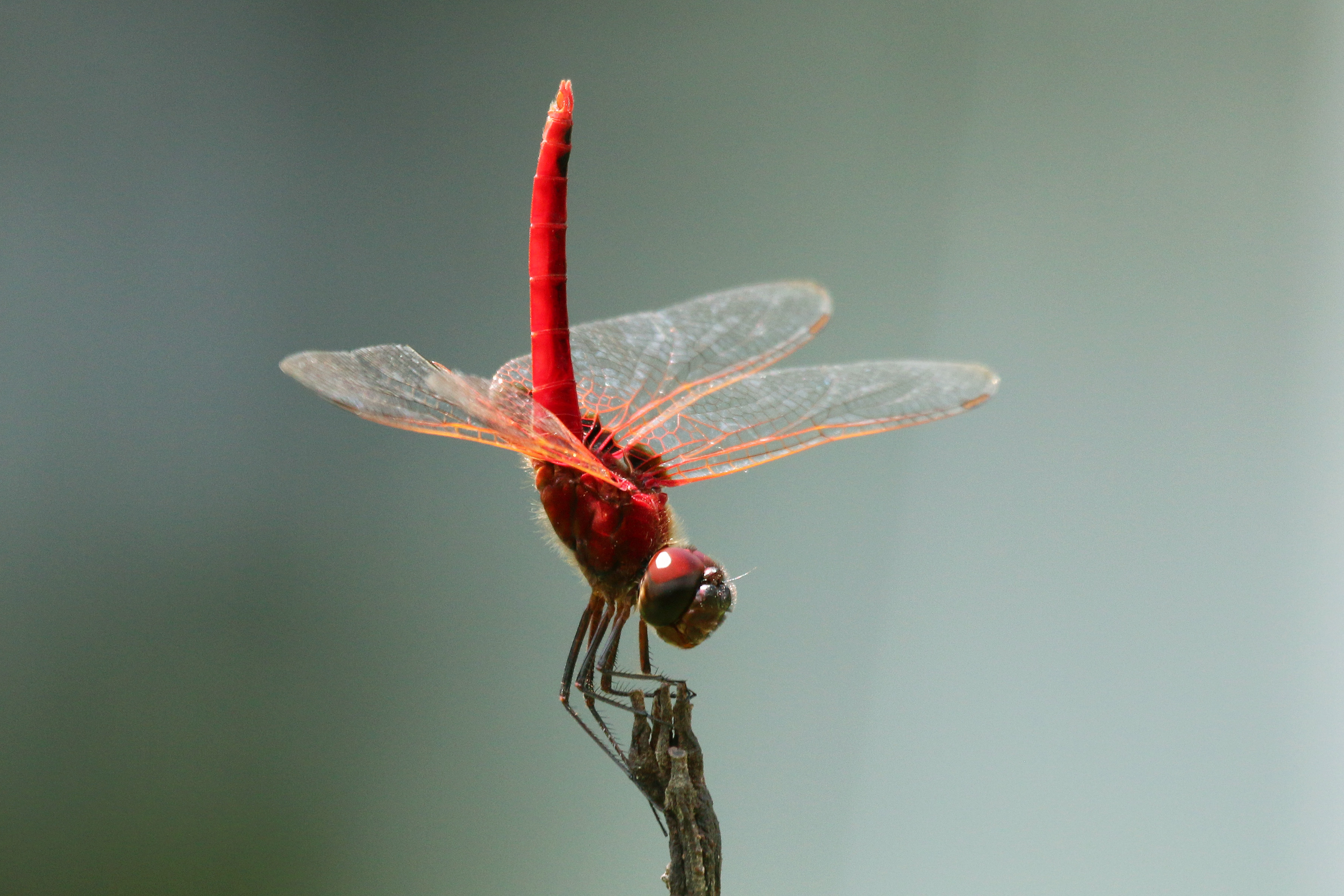
Male

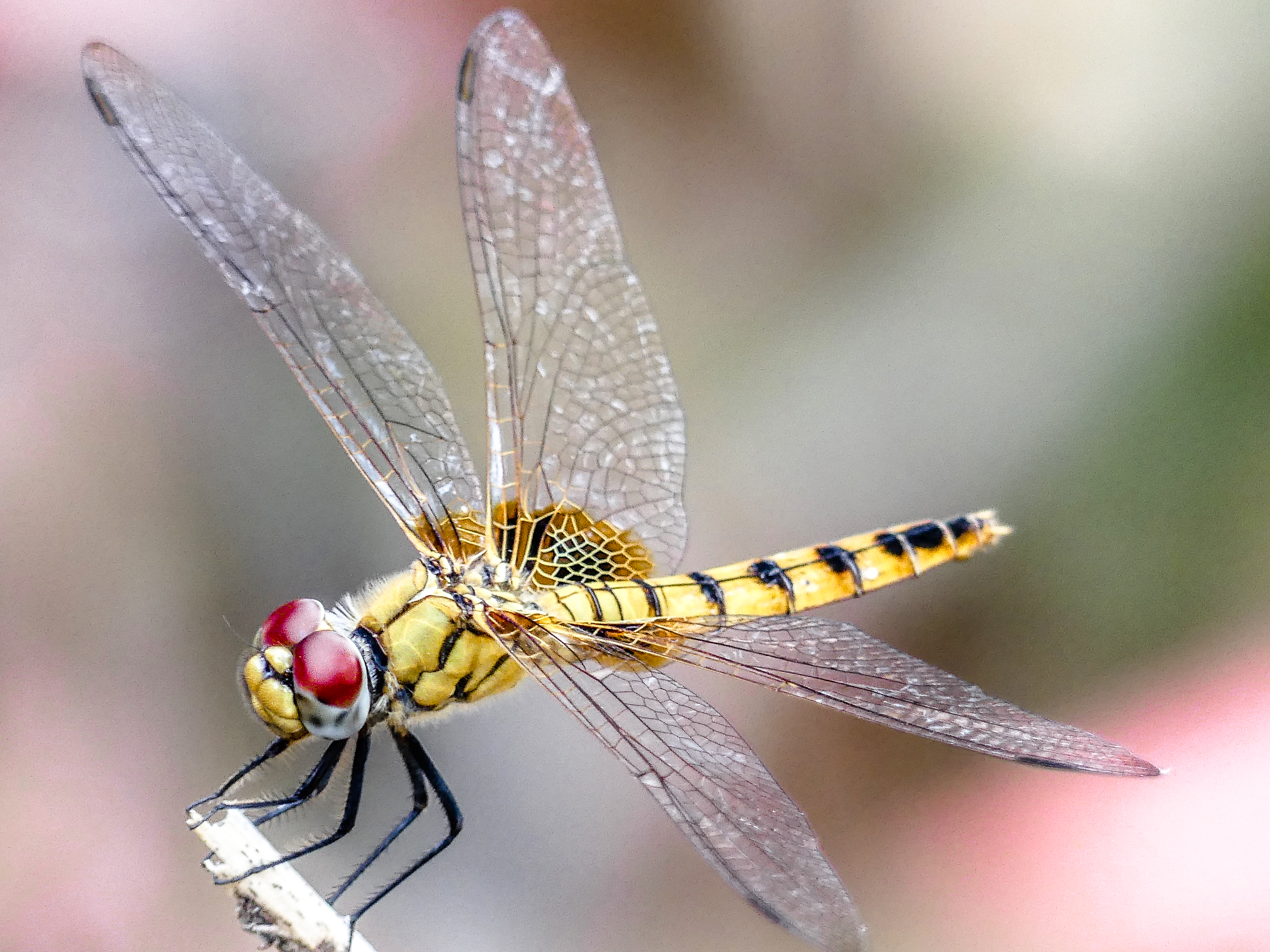
Female

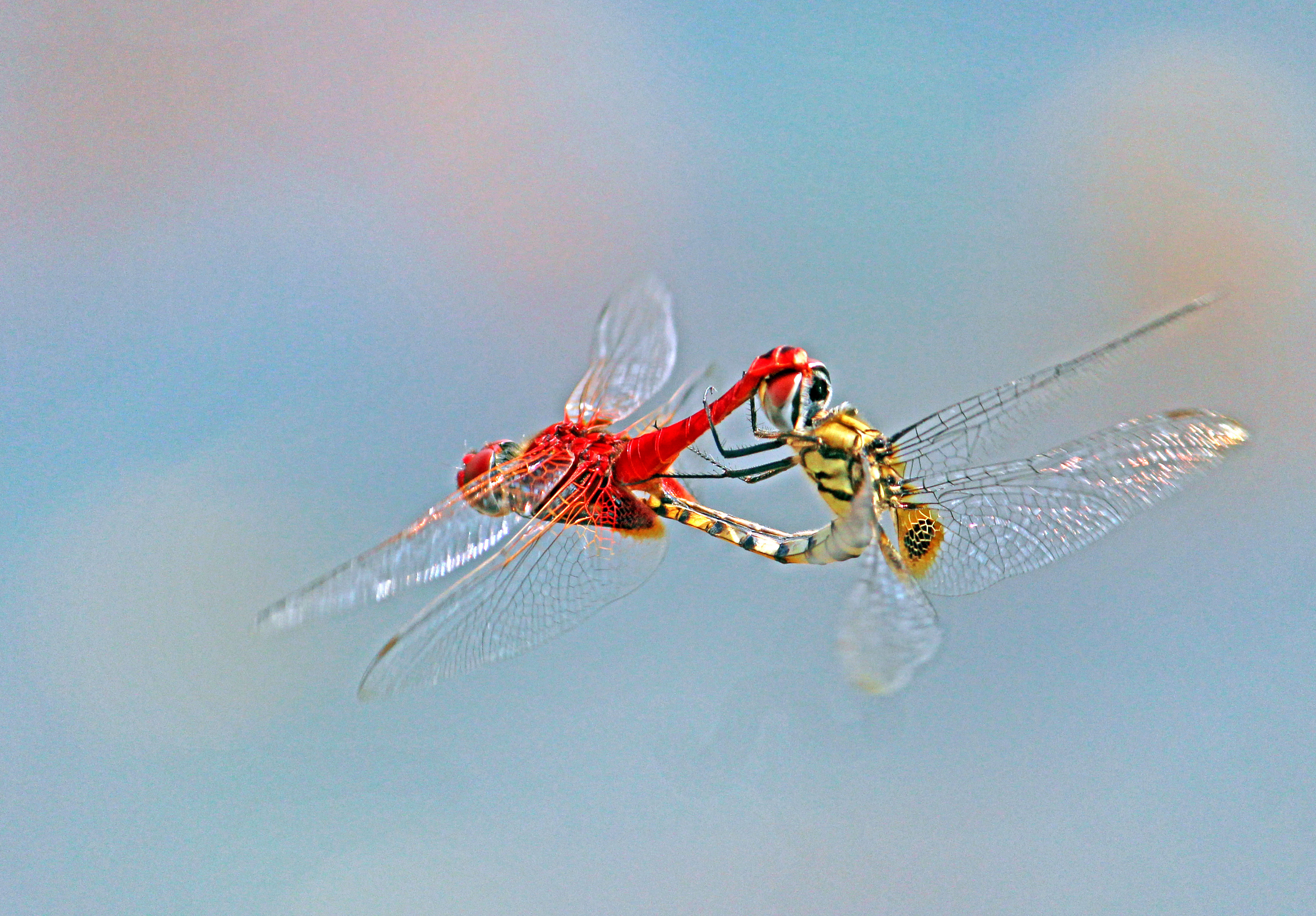
Mating

==== Species: Zyxomma petiolatum - dingy dusk-darter ====
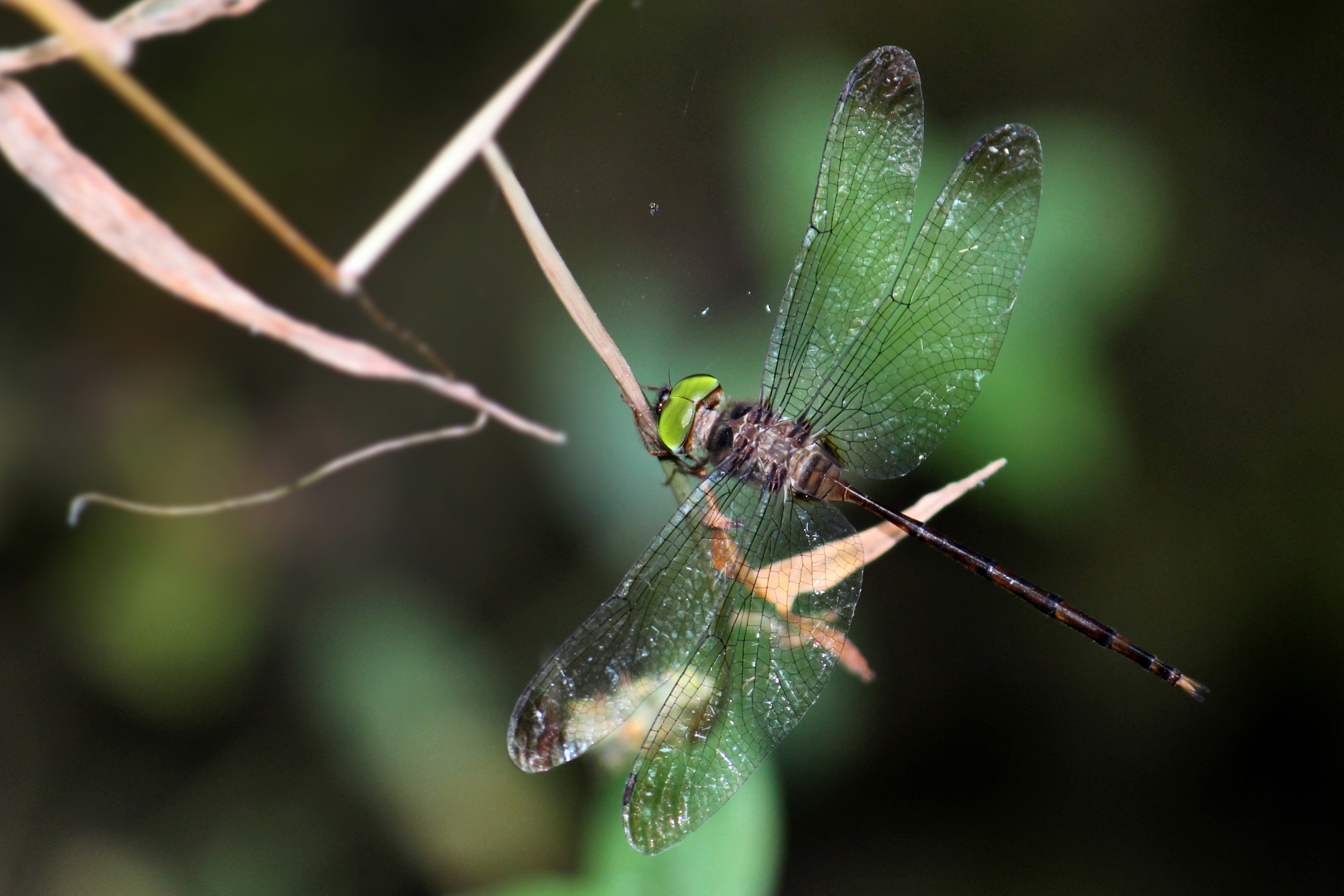
Male

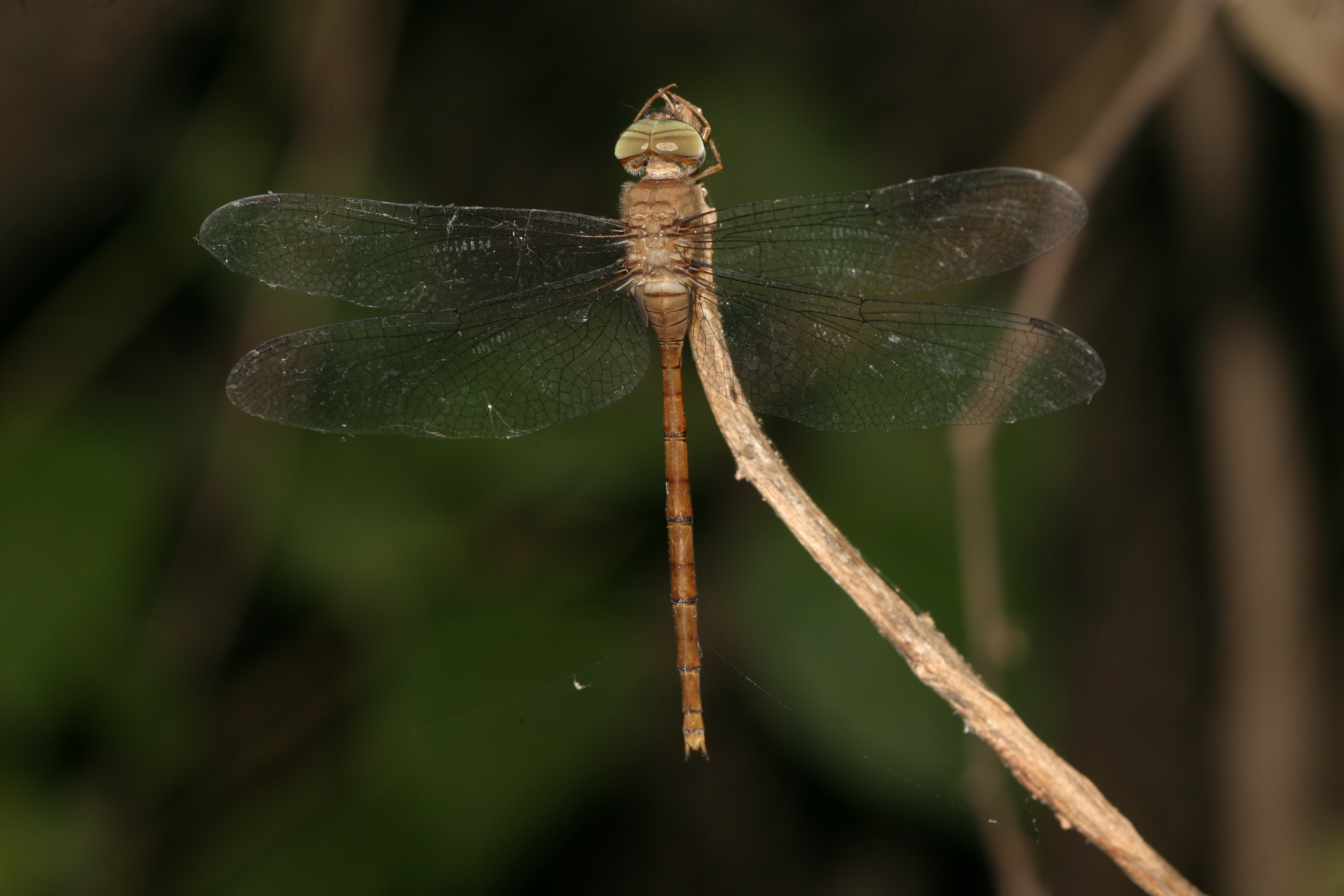
Female

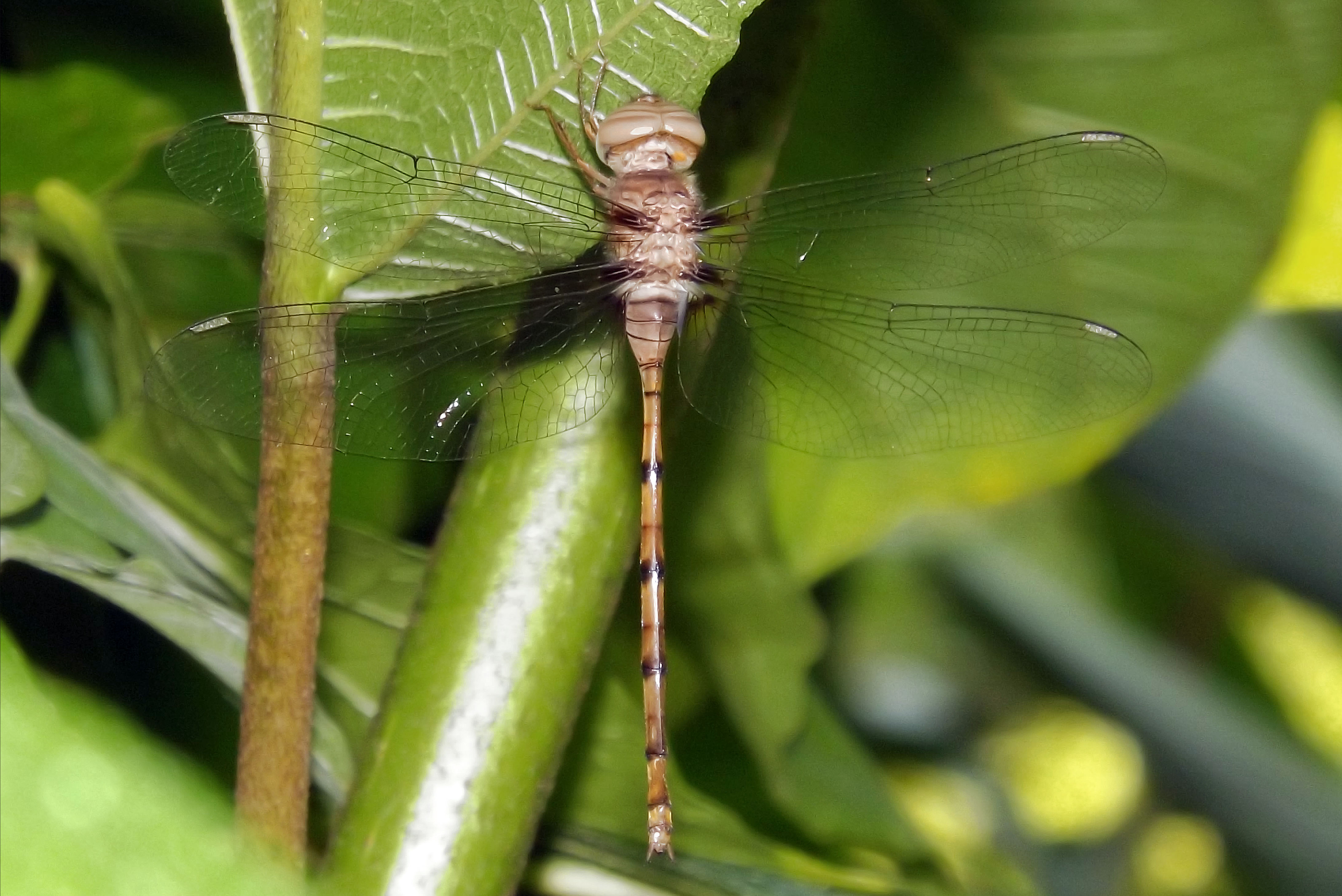
Young female
