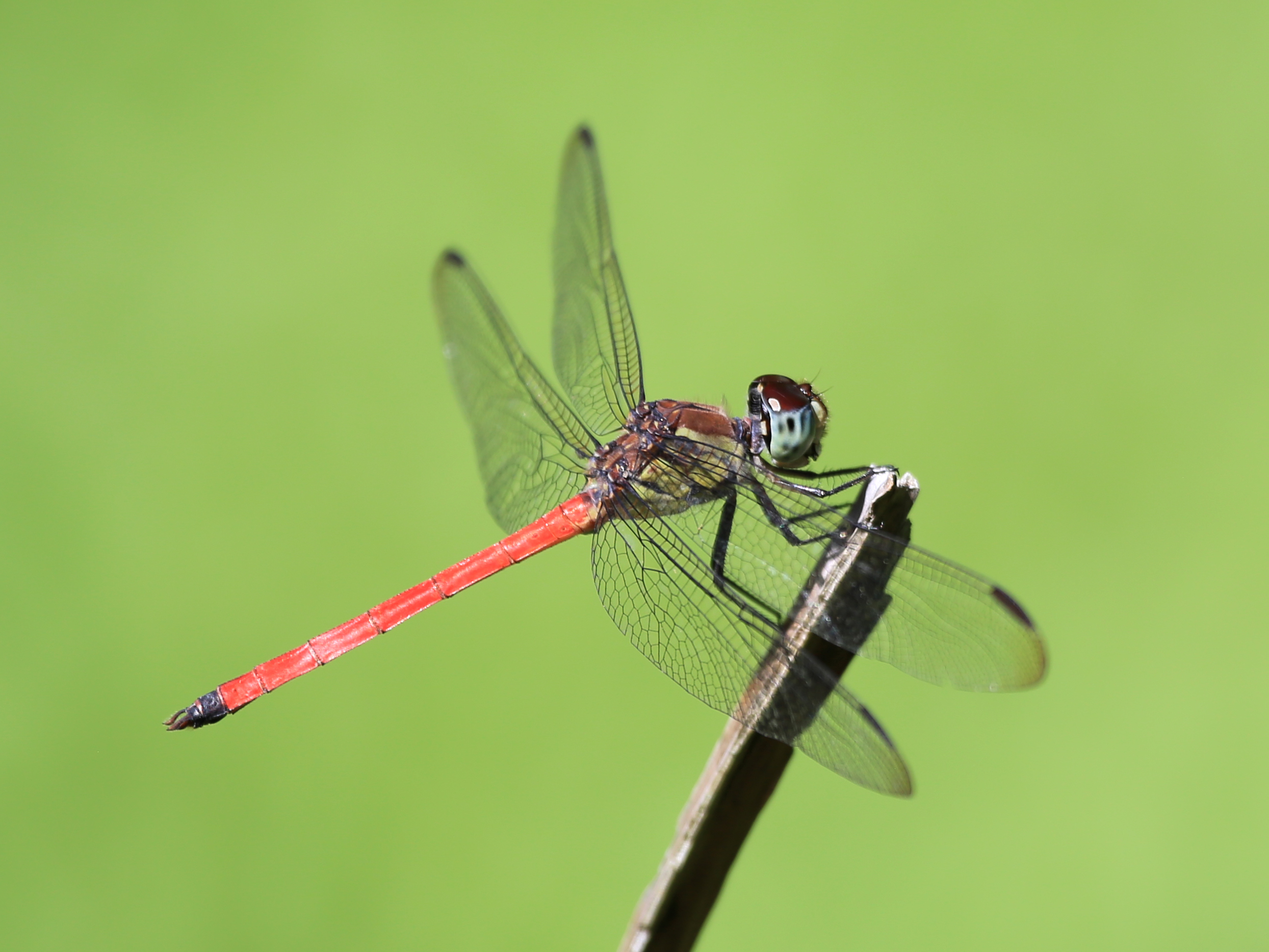
- Male Lathrecista asiatica festa, Cairns, Australia
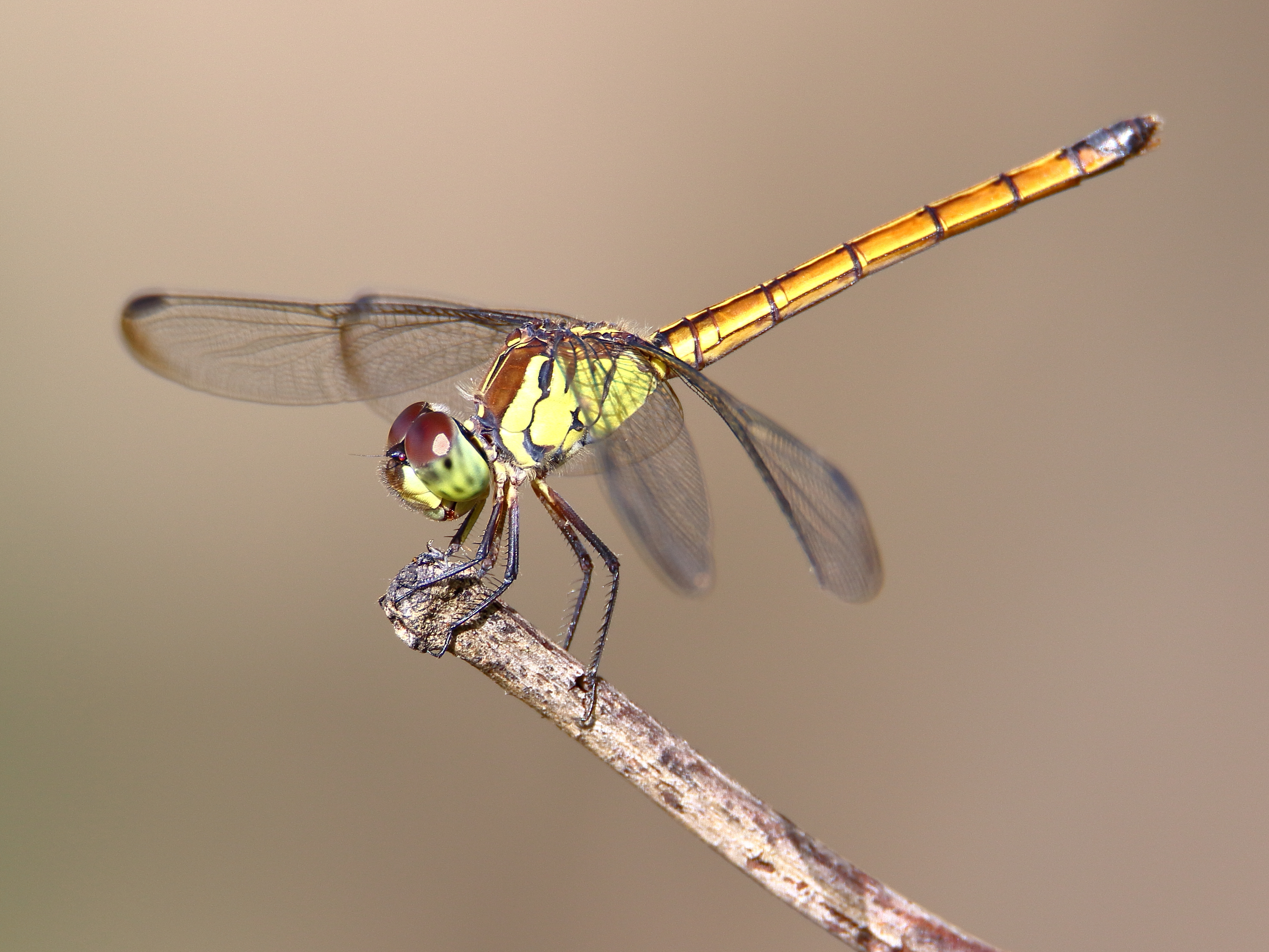
- Female

Conservation status
- Least Concern (IUCN 3.1)

Scientific classification
- Kingdom: Animalia
- Phylum: Arthropoda
- Clade: Pancrustacea
- Class: Insecta
- Order: Odonata
- Infraorder: Anisoptera
- Family: Libellulidae
- Genus: Lathrecista
- Species: L. asiatica
- Subspecies: L. a. festa

Trinomial name
- Lathrecista asiatica festa (Selys, 1879)

Synonyms
- Agrionoptera festa Selys, 1879

= Lathrecista asiatica festa =

Australasian slimwing

Subspecies of dragonfly

Lathrecista asiatica festa known as the Australasian slimwing is a sub-species of Lathrecista asiatica, a dragonfly in the Libellulidae family, found only in Australia. Its range is coastal and adjacent inland in an arc from the Northern Territory to the southern Queensland border. It is a medium-sized dragonfly with a wingspan of 60-85mm, and is usually near rivers, streams, swamps and lagoons but at times can be far from water. The male has a black and yellow thorax with brown upper parts, and a reddish-orange abdomen with a black tip. The taxon has been assessed for the IUCN Red List as Least Concern.

== Etymology ==
The genus name Lathrecista is derived from the Greek λαθραῖος (lathraios, "clandestine" or "hidden") and κίστη (kistē, "basket"), referring to the inconspicuous male appendages.

The species name asiatica is derived from the Latin asiaticus ("Asian" or "of Asia"). The original specimens of the species were collected in India.

The subspecies name festa is derived from the Latin festus ("festive" or "adorned for a celebration"), referring to the bright colouration of the male.

== Gallery ==
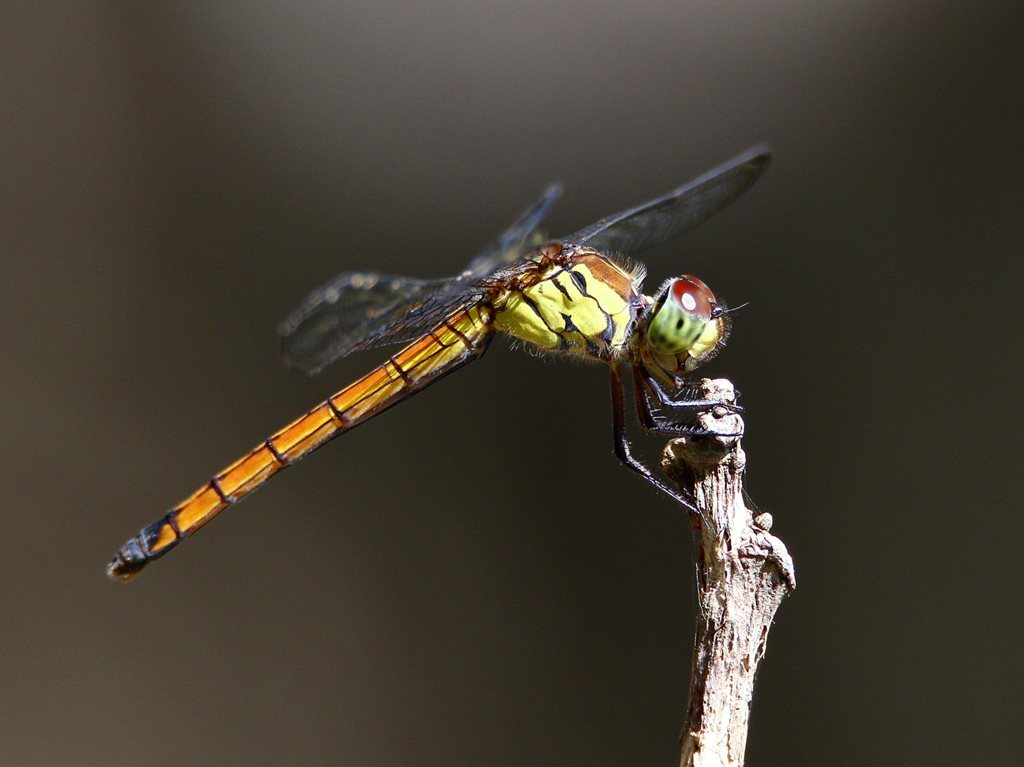
Female viewed from the side

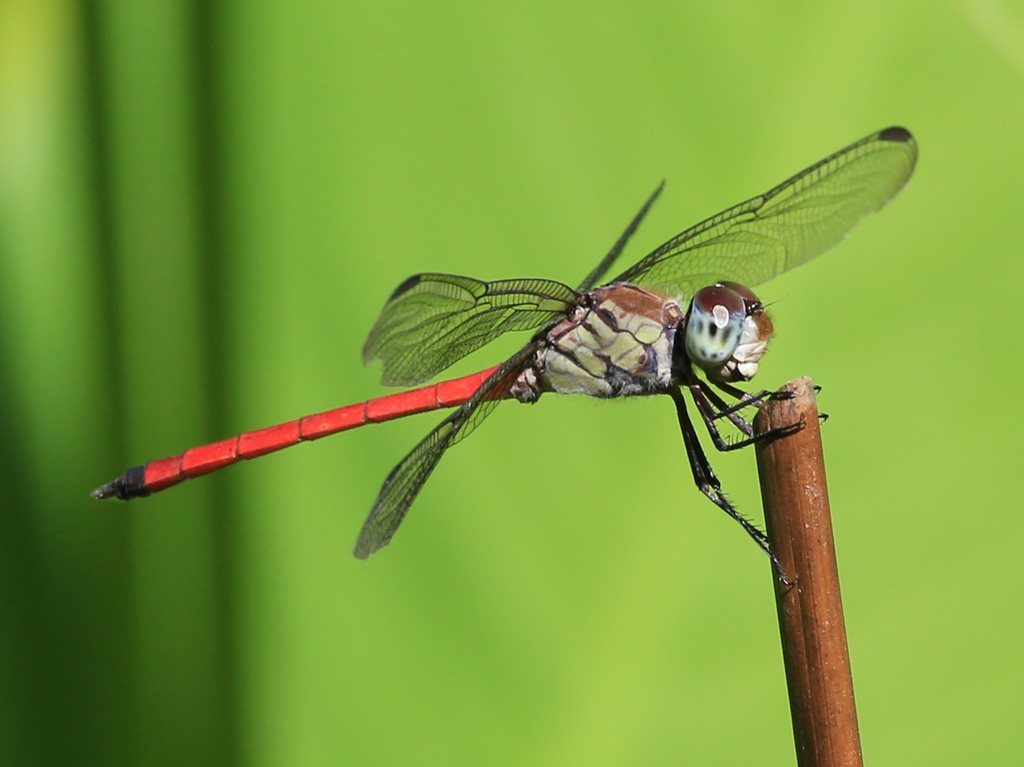
Male viewed from the side

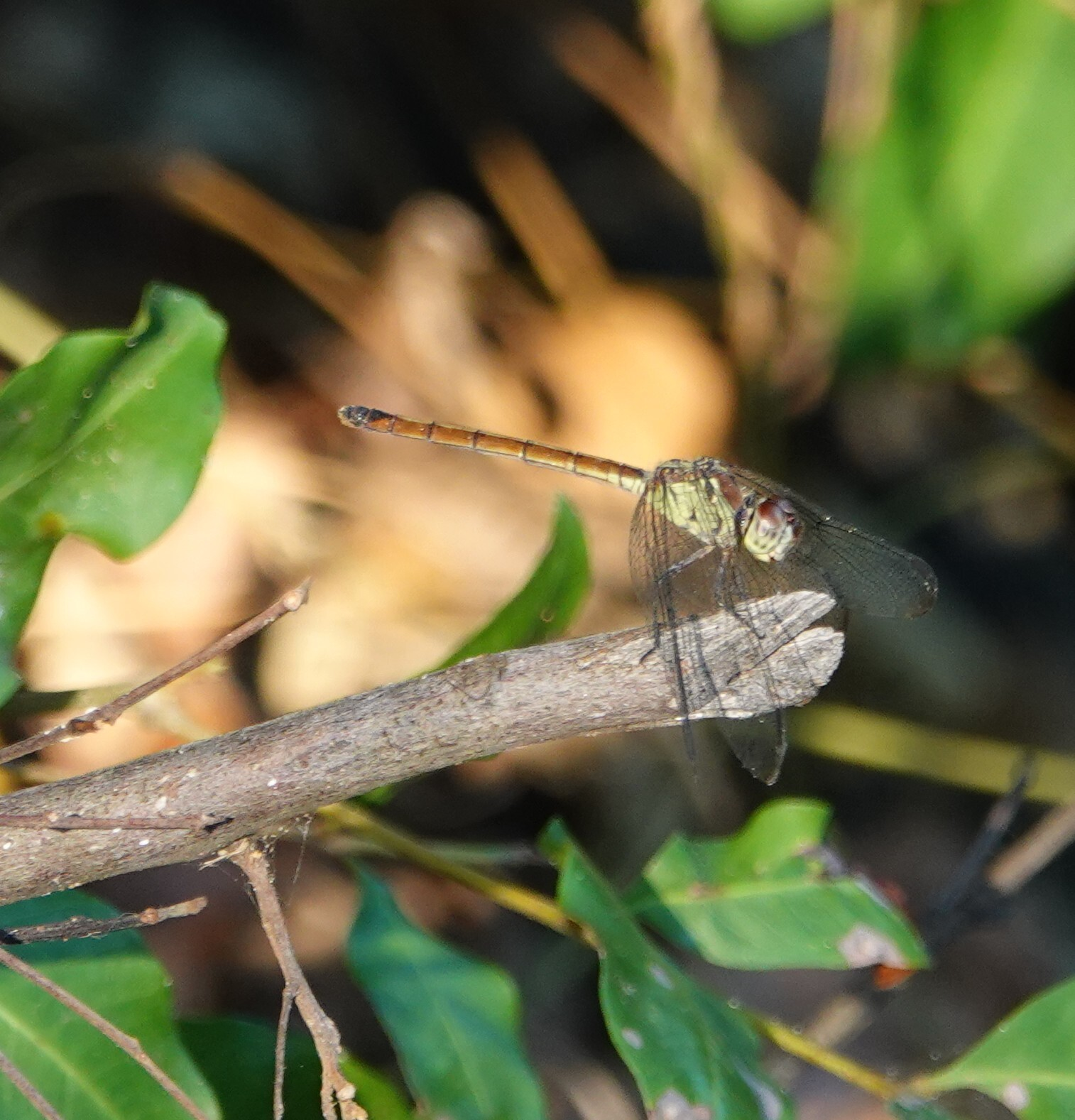
Female

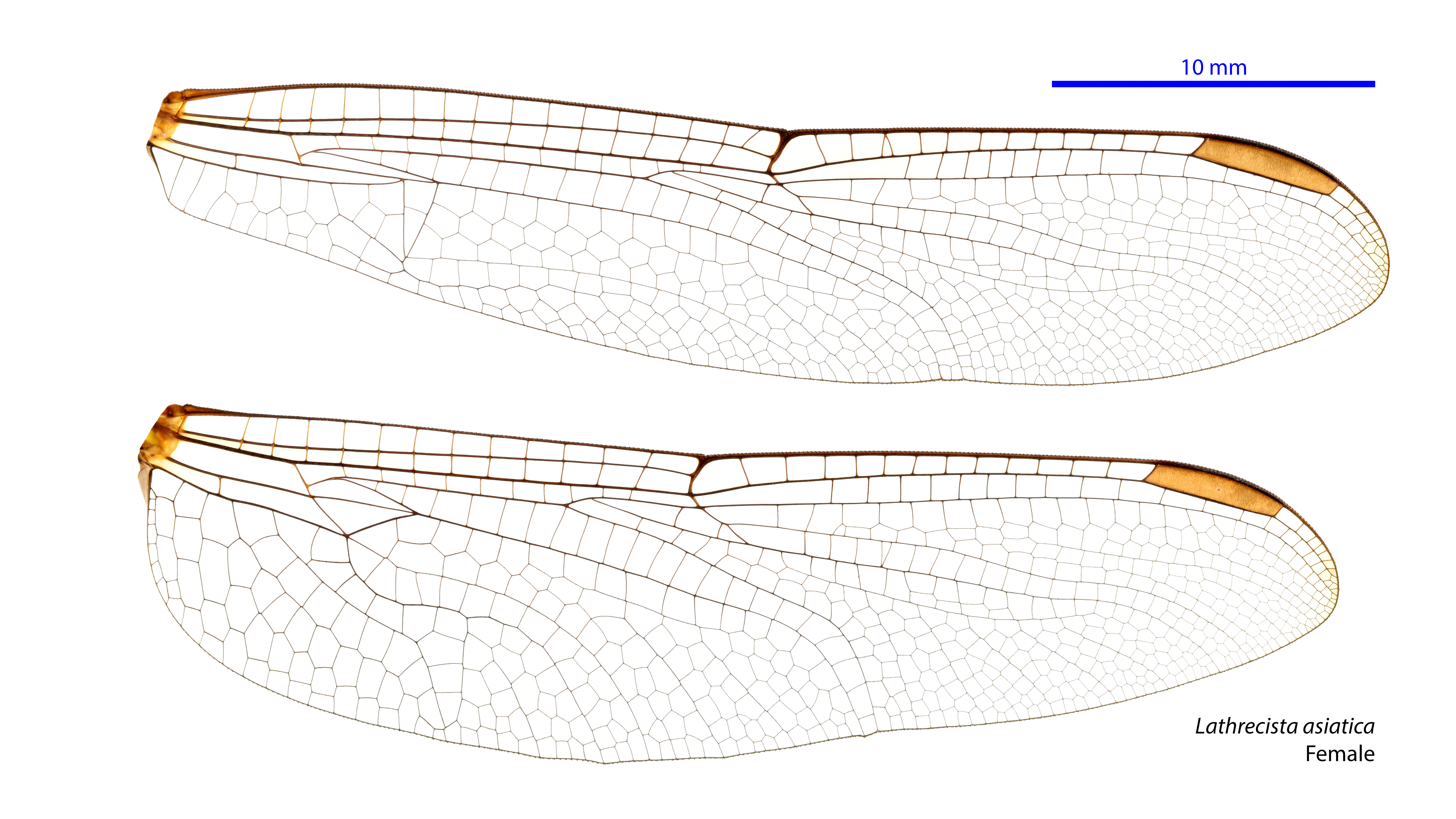
Female wings

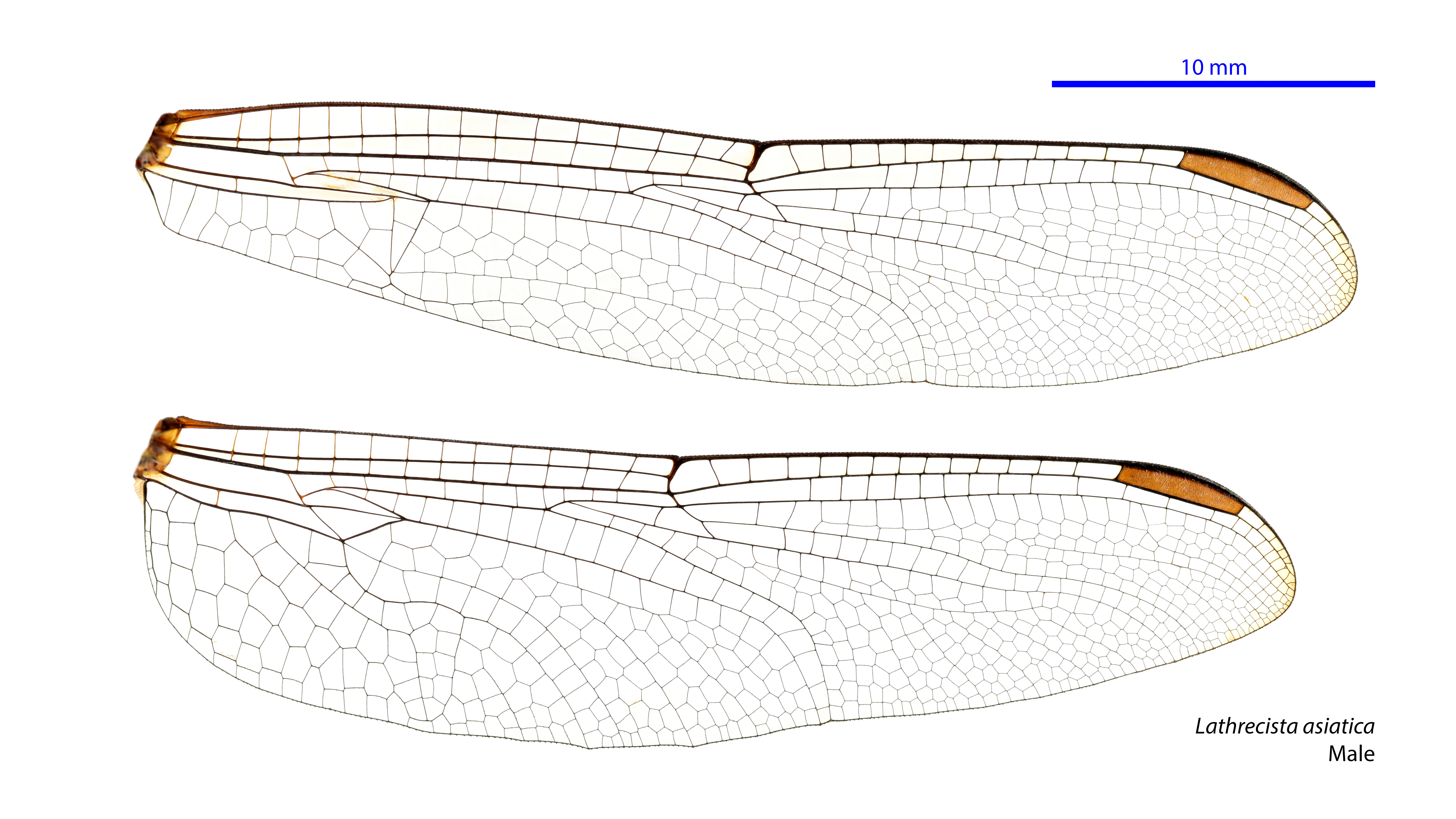
Male wings

== See also ==
- Lathrecista asiatica
- List of Odonata species of Australia
