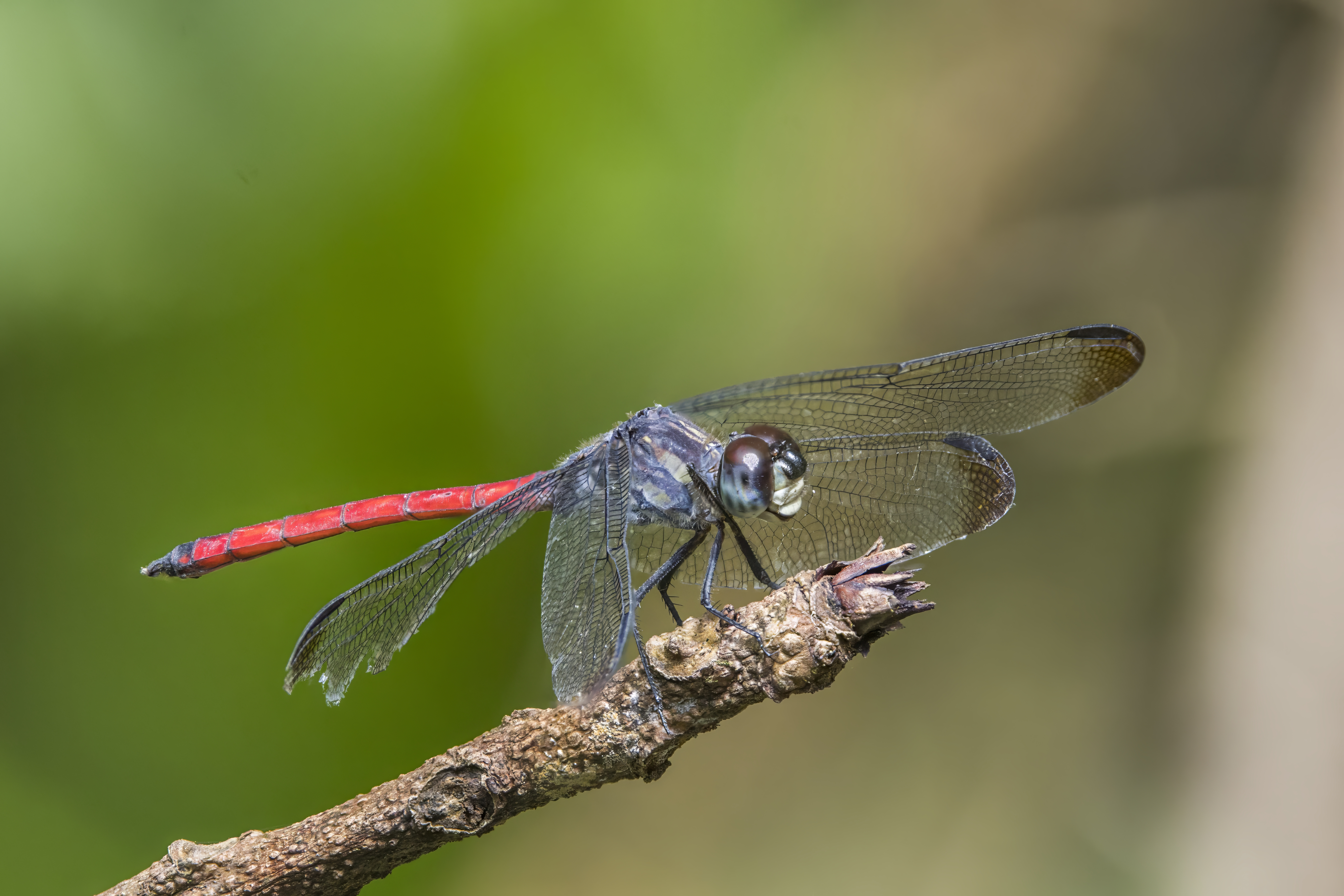
- male, Fiji
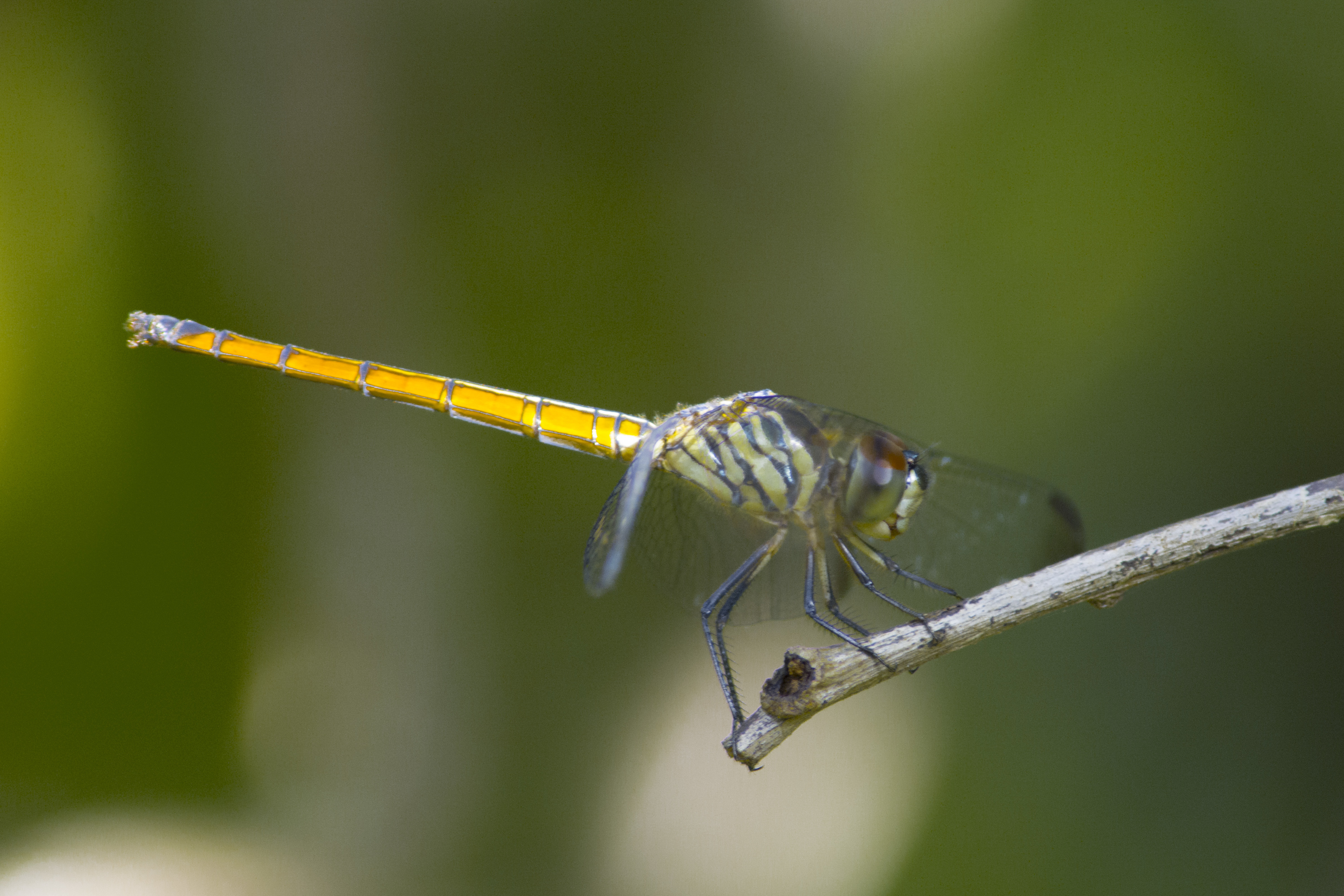
- female

Conservation status
- Least Concern (IUCN 3.1)

Scientific classification
- Kingdom: Animalia
- Phylum: Arthropoda
- Clade: Pancrustacea
- Class: Insecta
- Order: Odonata
- Infraorder: Anisoptera
- Family: Libellulidae
- Genus: Lathrecista
- Species: L. asiatica

Binomial name
- Lathrecista asiatica (Fabricius, 1798)

Synonyms
- Libellula asiatica Fabricius, 1798; Libellula pectoralis Brauer, 1867; Agrionoptera festa Selys, 1879; Agrionoptera simulans Selys, 1879; Lathrecista terminalis Kirby, 1889

= Lathrecista asiatica =

Species of dragonfly

Lathrecista asiatica, the asiatic blood tail, is a species of dragonfly in the family Libellulidae. It is the only species in its genus. It is widespread, occurring from India to Australia.

== Subspecies ==
- Lathrecista asiatica asiatica
- Lathrecista asiatica festa (Selys, 1879)
- Lathrecista asiatica pectoralis (Kaup in Brauer, 1867)

== Description and habitat ==
It is a medium-sized dragonfly with brown-capped grey eyes and blood red tail. Its thorax is copper brown with a pair of narrow parallel yellow stripes on dorsal side and yellow with stripes on the sides. Segments 1 and 2 of the abdomen have broad lateral stripes and a fine mid-dorsal stripe. Segments 3 to 8 are bright crimson-red with apical sutures narrowly black. Segments 9 and 10 are black. Anal appendages are black. The abdomen of the female is brown.

It breeds in marshes associated with ponds and streams.

== Etymology ==
The genus name Lathrecista is derived from the Greek λαθραῖος (lathraios, "clandestine" or "hidden") and κίστη (kistē, "basket"), referring to the inconspicuous male appendages.

The species name asiatica is derived from the Latin asiaticus ("Asian" or "of Asia"). The original specimens of the species were collected in India.

== See also ==
- List of odonates of India
- List of odonata of Kerala
- List of Odonata species of Australia
