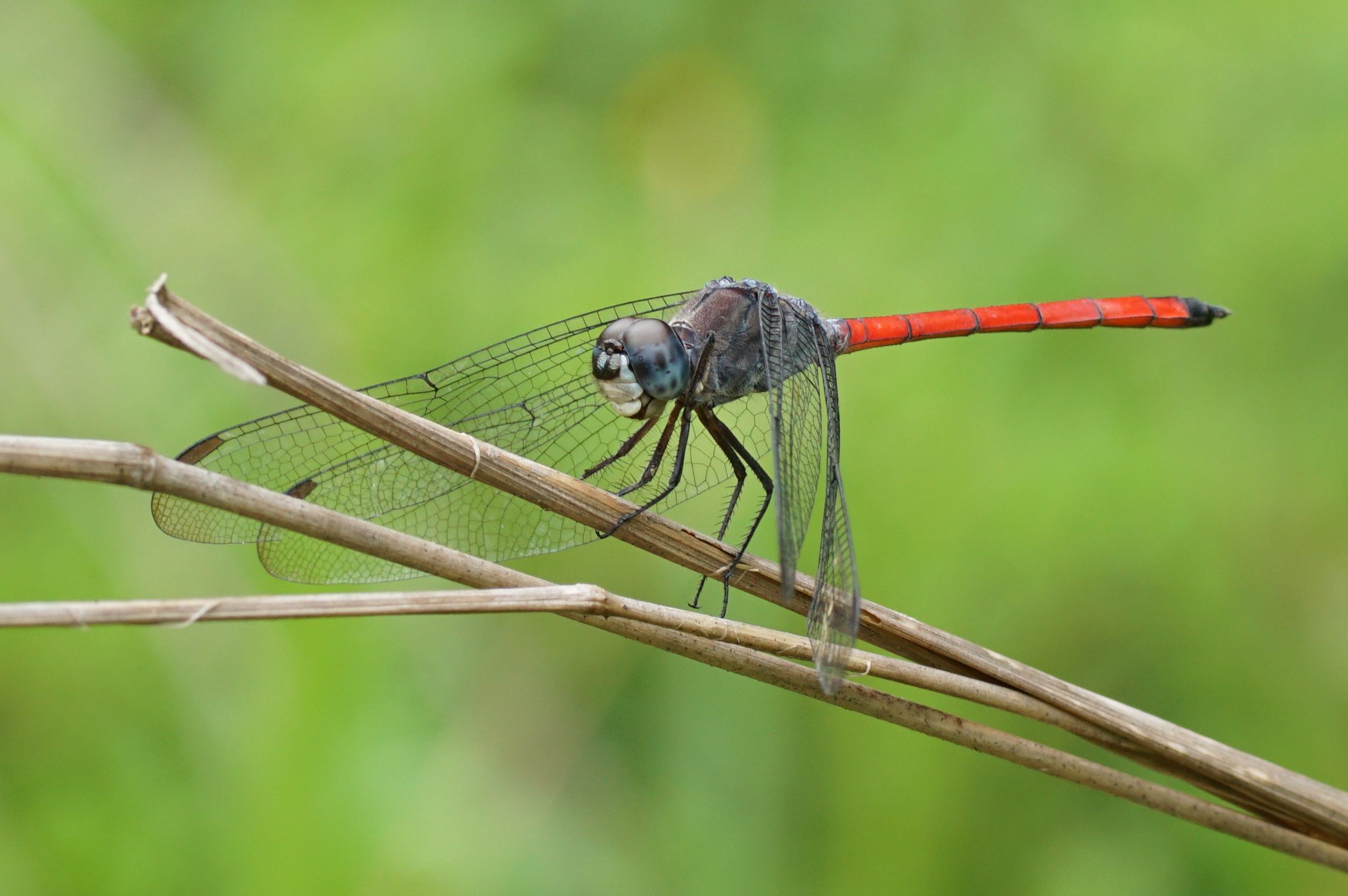
- Lathrecista asiatica male

Scientific classification
- Kingdom: Animalia
- Phylum: Arthropoda
- Clade: Pancrustacea
- Class: Insecta
- Order: Odonata
- Suborder: Anisoptera
- Superfamily: Libelluloidea
- Family: Libellulidae
- Subfamily: Libellulinae
- Genus: Lathrecista; Kirby, 1889

= Lathrecista =

Genus of dragonflies

Lathrecista is a genus of dragonflies in the family Libellulidae. There is only one known species of this genus.

== Distribution ==
This genus occurs in India through Southeast Asia and Oceania including Australia, Fiji, and Tonga.

== Species ==
The genus Lathrecista contains a single species:

- Lathrecista asiatica (Fabricius, 1798)

== Etymology ==
The genus name Lathrecista is derived from the Greek λαθραῖος (lathraios, "clandestine" or "hidden") and κίστη (kistē, "basket"), referring to the inconspicuous male appendages.
