= List of Phyllocycla species =

This is a list of 31 species in the genus Phyllocycla.

== Phyllocycla species ==
- Phyllocycla anduzei (Needham, 1943)
- Phyllocycla argentina (Hagen in Selys, 1878)
- Phyllocycla armata Belle, 1977
- Phyllocycla baria Belle, 1987
- Phyllocycla bartica Calvert, 1948
- Phyllocycla basidenta Dunkle, 1987
- Phyllocycla brasilia Belle, 1988
- Phyllocycla breviphylla Belle, 1975 (ringed forceptail)
- Phyllocycla diphylla (Selys, 1854)
- Phyllocycla elongata (Selys, 1858)
- Phyllocycla foliata Belle, 1988
- Phyllocycla gladiata (Hagen in Selys, 1854)
- Phyllocycla hamata Belle, 1990
- Phyllocycla hespera (Calvert, 1909)
- Phyllocycla malkini Belle, 1970
- Phyllocycla medusa Belle, 1988
- Phyllocycla modesta Belle, 1970
- Phyllocycla murrea Belle, 1988
- Phyllocycla neotropica Belle, 1970
- Phyllocycla ophis (Selys, 1869)
- Phyllocycla pallida Belle, 1970
- Phyllocycla pegasus (Selys, 1869)
- Phyllocycla propinqua Belle, 1972
- Phyllocycla signata (Hagen in Selys, 1854)
- Phyllocycla sordida (Selys, 1854)
- Phyllocycla speculatrix Belle, 1975
- Phyllocycla titschacki (Schmidt, 1942)
- Phyllocycla uniforma Dunkle, 1987
- Phyllocycla vesta Belle, 1972
- Phyllocycla viridipleuris (Calvert, 1909)
- Phyllocycla volsella (Calvert, 1905)
