= Appleton Lower Common =

Common with significant biodiversity in Oxfordshire

Coordinates: 51.703°N 1.386°W

- Site of Special Scientific Interest
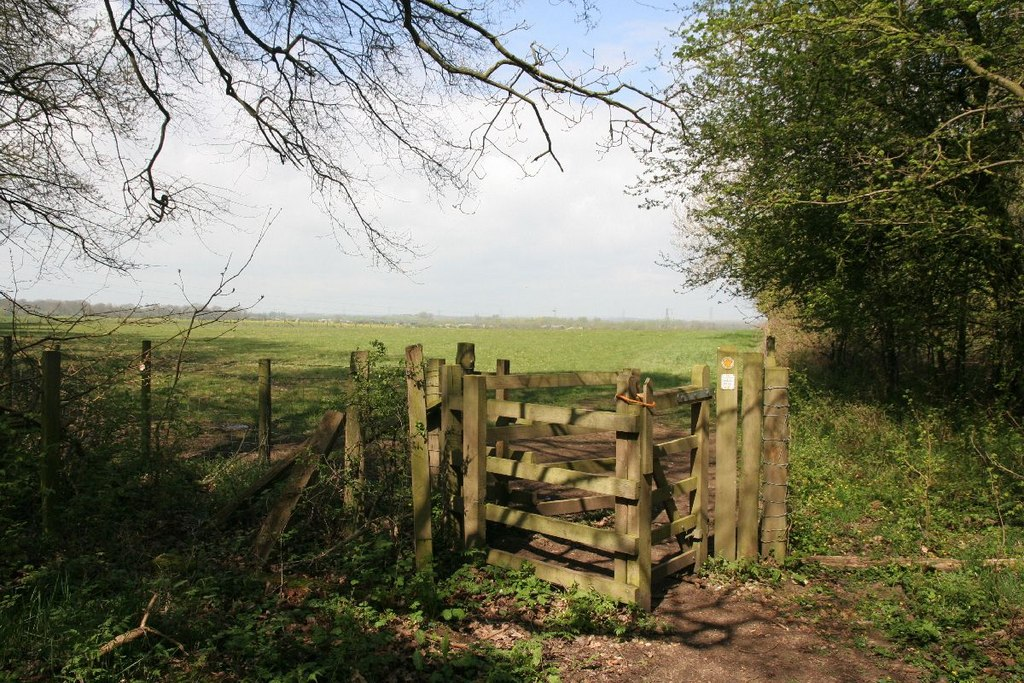
- Location of Appleton Lower Common.
- Area of search: Oxfordshire
- Grid reference: SP 425 007
- Interest: Biological
- Area: 47.3 hectares (117 acres)
- Notification date: 1986
- Location map: Magic Map

Appleton Lower Common is a 47.3-hectare (117-acre) biological Site of Special Scientific Interest west of Appleton in Oxfordshire.

The common has diverse broadleaved woodland on Oxford Clay with rides and glades. The shrub layer has a rich variety of species, such as primrose, goldilocks buttercup, early purple orchid, twayblade and wood anemone. Invertebrates include the rare club-tailed dragonfly.

The site is private land but it is crossed by two public footpaths.
