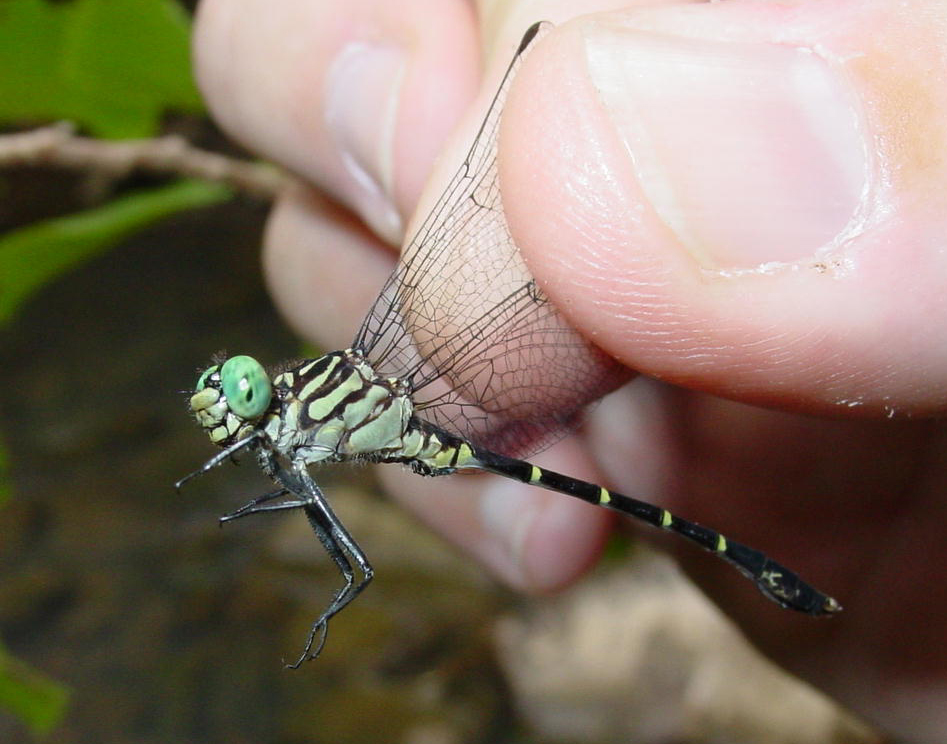

Conservation status
- Least Concern (IUCN 3.1)

Scientific classification
- Kingdom: Animalia
- Phylum: Arthropoda
- Class: Insecta
- Order: Odonata
- Infraorder: Anisoptera
- Family: Gomphidae
- Genus: Stylogomphus
- Species: S. albistylus

Binomial name
- Stylogomphus albistylus (Hagen in Selys, 1878)

= Stylogomphus albistylus =

Species of dragonfly

Stylogomphus albistylus, the eastern least clubtail, is a species of dragonfly in the family Gomphidae. It is typically found in North America, particularly in the Appalachians and eastward. It can also be found in the states of Ohio, Michigan, and Wisconsin.

The IUCN conservation status of Stylogomphus albistylus is "LC", least concern, with no immediate threat to the species' survival. The population is stable.

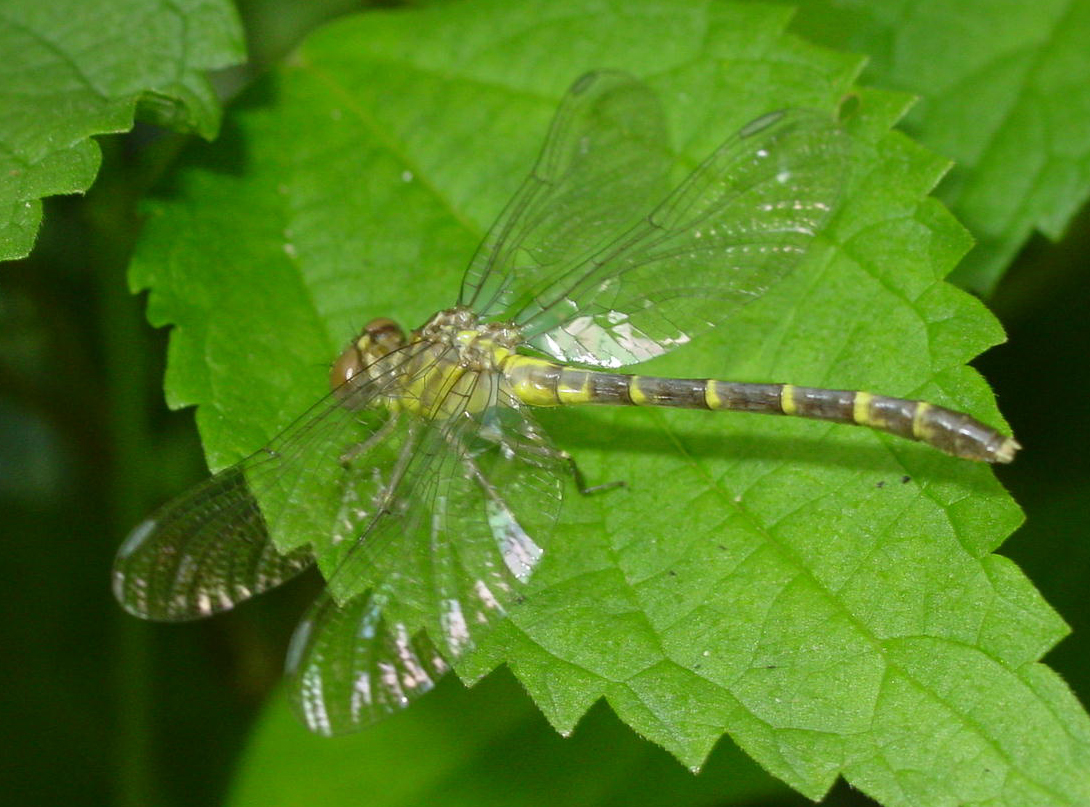
Eastern least clubtail, Stylogomphus albistylus
