= Diastatomma bicolor =

Conservation status
- Least Concern (IUCN 3.1)

Scientific classification
- Kingdom: Animalia
- Phylum: Arthropoda
- Class: Insecta
- Order: Odonata
- Infraorder: Anisoptera
- Family: Gomphidae
- Genus: Diastatomma
- Species: D. bicolor

Binomial name
- Diastatomma bicolor Selys, 1869

Synonyms
- Diastatomma selysi Schouteden, 1934

Species of dragonfly

Diastatomma bicolor is a species of dragonfly in the family Gomphidae. It is found in Angola, Cameroon, the Democratic Republic of the Congo, Equatorial Guinea, Guinea, Togo, Uganda, and Zambia. Its natural habitats are subtropical or tropical moist lowland forests and rivers.
