= Isomma hieroglyphicum =

Conservation status
- Least Concern (IUCN 3.1)

Scientific classification
- Kingdom: Animalia
- Phylum: Arthropoda
- Class: Insecta
- Order: Odonata
- Infraorder: Anisoptera
- Family: Gomphidae
- Genus: Isomma
- Species: I. hieroglyphicum

Binomial name
- Isomma hieroglyphicum Sélys, 1892

Species of dragonfly

Isomma hieroglyphicum is a species of dragonfly in the family Gomphidae. It is endemic to Madagascar.
