= Stylogomphus sigmastylus =

Conservation status
- Least Concern (IUCN 3.1)

Scientific classification
- Kingdom: Animalia
- Phylum: Arthropoda
- Class: Insecta
- Order: Odonata
- Infraorder: Anisoptera
- Family: Gomphidae
- Genus: Stylogomphus
- Species: S. sigmastylus

Binomial name
- Stylogomphus sigmastylus Cook & Laudermilk, 2004

Species of dragonfly

Stylogomphus sigmastylus, the interior least clubtail, is a species of clubtail dragonfly in the family of dragonflies known as Gomphidae. It is found in North America.

The IUCN conservation status of Stylogomphus sigmastylus is "LC", least concern, with no immediate threat to the species' survival. The population is stable.
