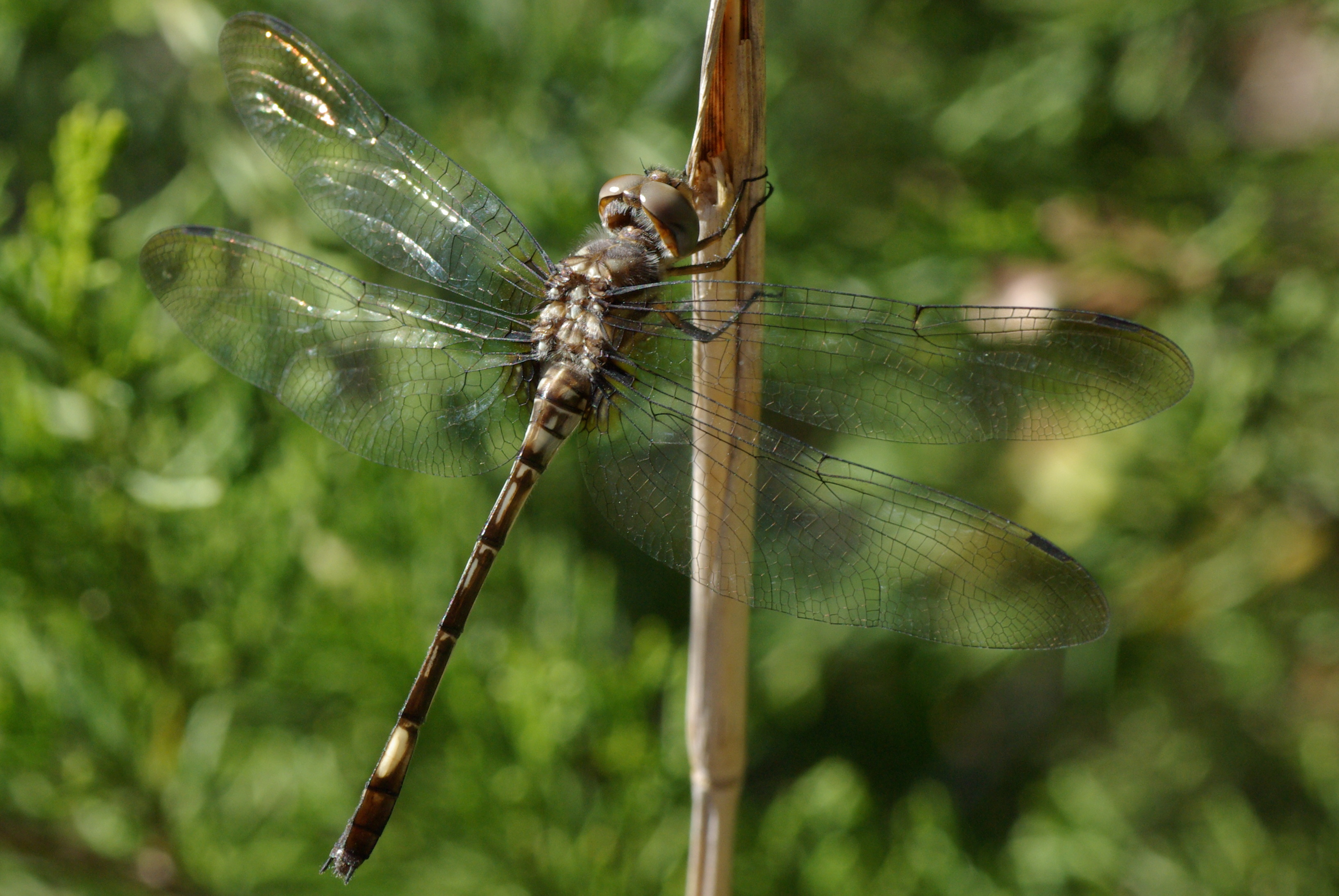
- Pale-faced clubskimmer

Scientific classification
- Kingdom: Animalia
- Phylum: Arthropoda
- Class: Insecta
- Order: Odonata
- Infraorder: Anisoptera
- Family: Libellulidae
- Subfamily: Trithemistinae
- Genus: Brechmorhoga; Kirby, 1894

= Brechmorhoga =

Clubskimmers

Genus of dragonflies

Brechmorhoga is a genus of dragonfly in the Libellulidae family. Members of this genus are commonly called clubskimmers because of the widening abdominal segments much like the clubtails.

The genus contains the following species:

- Brechmorhoga archboldi (Donnelly, 1970)
- Brechmorhoga diplosema Ris, 1913
- Brechmorhoga flavoannulata Lacroix, 1920
- Brechmorhoga flavopunctata (Martin, 1897)
- Brechmorhoga innupta Rácenis, 1954
- Brechmorhoga latialata González, 1999
- Brechmorhoga mendax (Hagen, 1861) – pale-faced clubskimmer
- Brechmorhoga neblinae De Marmels, 1989
- Brechmorhoga nubecula (Rambur, 1842)
- Brechmorhoga pertinax (Hagen, 1861) – masked clubskimmer
- Brechmorhoga praecox (Hagen, 1861) – slender clubskimmer
- Brechmorhoga praedatrix Calvert, 1909
- Brechmorhoga rapax Calvert, 1898
- Brechmorhoga tepeaca Calvert, 1908
- Brechmorhoga travassosi Santos, 1946
- Brechmorhoga vivax Calvert, 1906
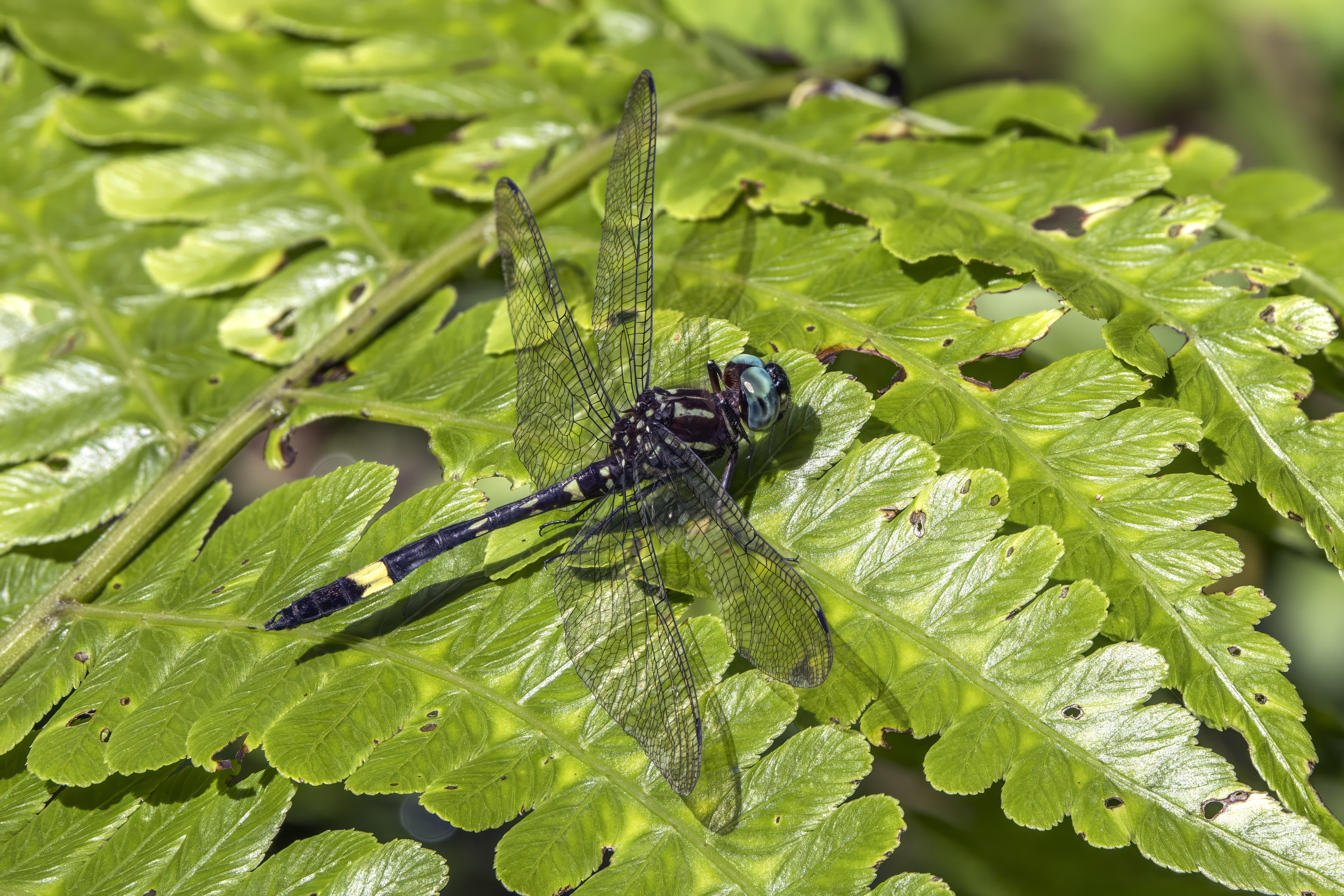
Amber-banded clubskimmer

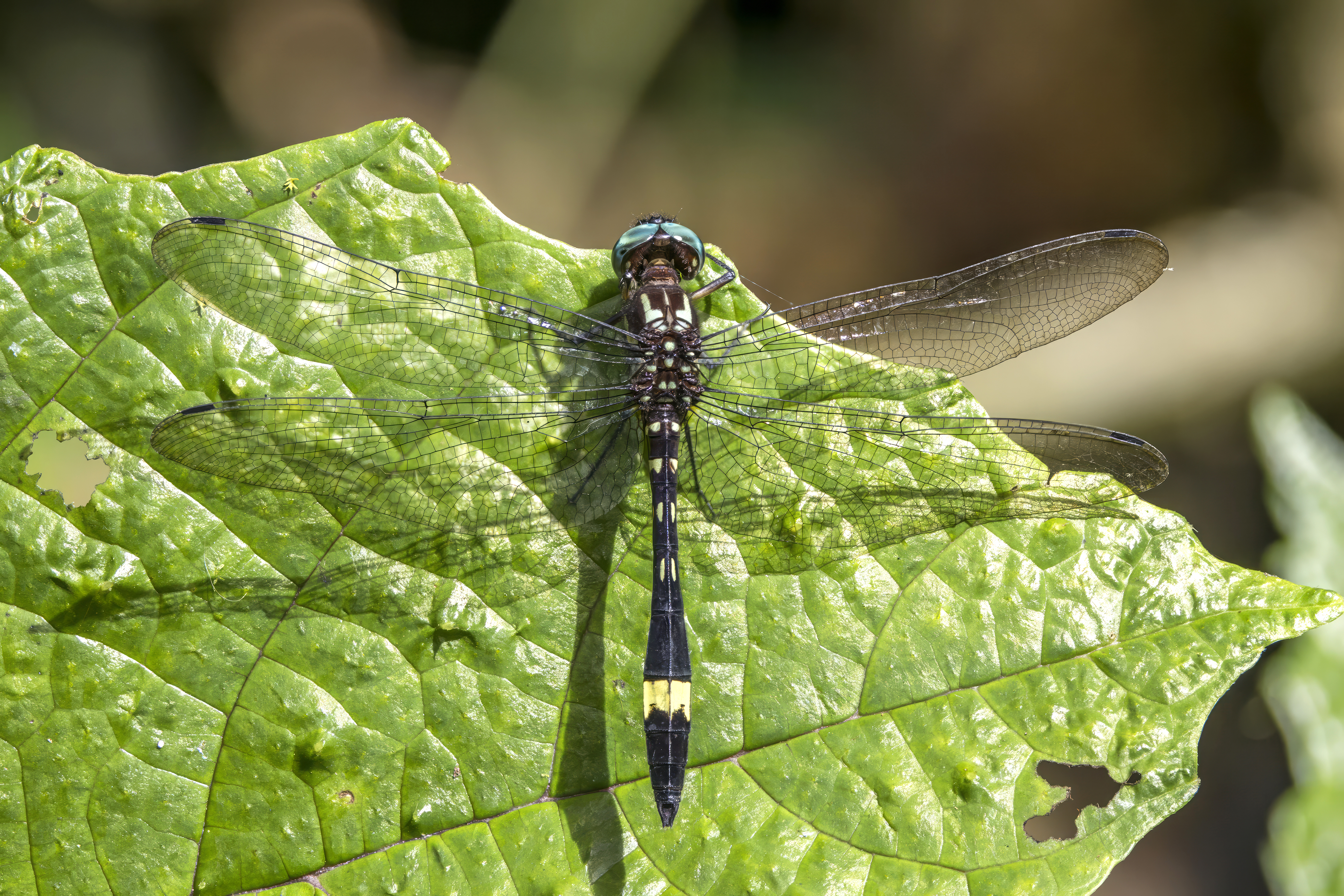
B. rapax, Colombia
