= Perigomphus pallidistylus =

Conservation status
- Vulnerable (IUCN 3.1)

Scientific classification
- Kingdom: Animalia
- Phylum: Arthropoda
- Class: Insecta
- Order: Odonata
- Infraorder: Anisoptera
- Family: Gomphidae
- Genus: Perigomphus
- Species: P. pallidistylus

Binomial name
- Perigomphus pallidistylus (Belle, 1972)

Synonyms
- Diaphlebia pallidistylus Belle, 1972

Species of dragonfly

Perigomphus pallidistylus is a species of dragonfly in the family Gomphidae. It is found in Costa Rica and Panama. Its natural habitats are subtropical or tropical moist lowland forests and rivers. It is threatened by habitat loss.
