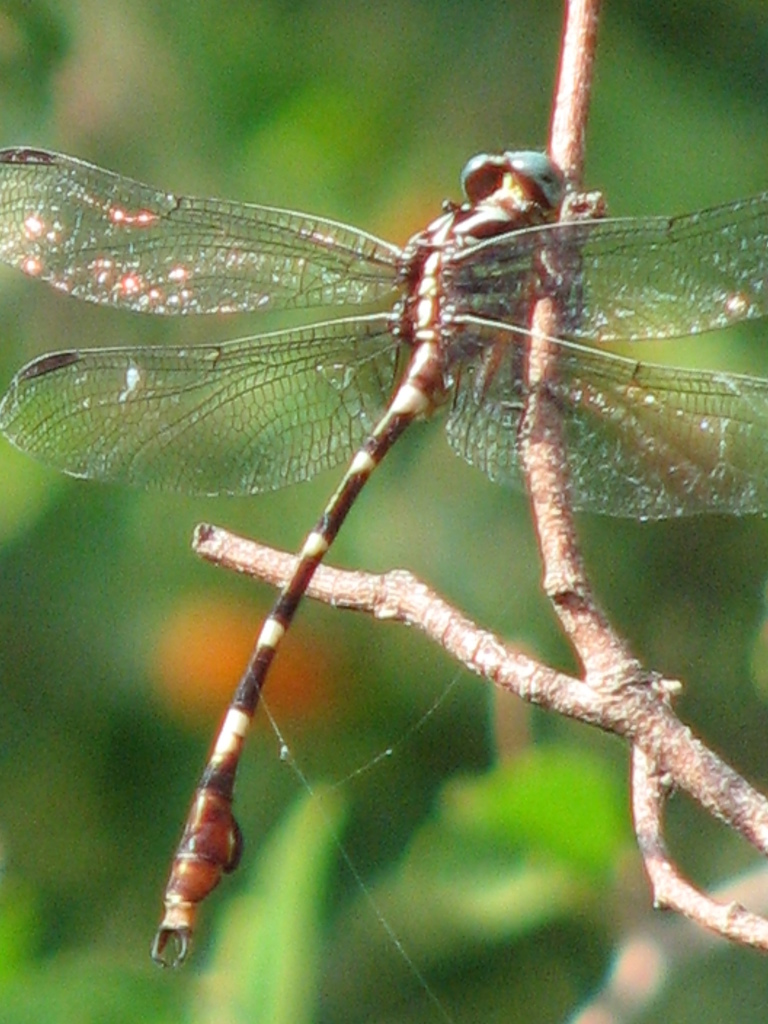

Conservation status
- Least Concern (IUCN 3.1)

Scientific classification
- Domain: Eukaryota
- Kingdom: Animalia
- Phylum: Arthropoda
- Class: Insecta
- Order: Odonata
- Infraorder: Anisoptera
- Family: Gomphidae
- Genus: Phyllocycla
- Species: P. breviphylla

Binomial name
- Phyllocycla breviphylla Belle, 1975

= Phyllocycla breviphylla =

Species of dragonfly

Phyllocycla breviphylla, the ringed forceptail, is a species of clubtails in the family Gomphidae. It is found in Central America and South America.

The IUCN conservation status of Phyllocycla breviphylla is "LC", least concern, with no immediate threat to the species' survival.
