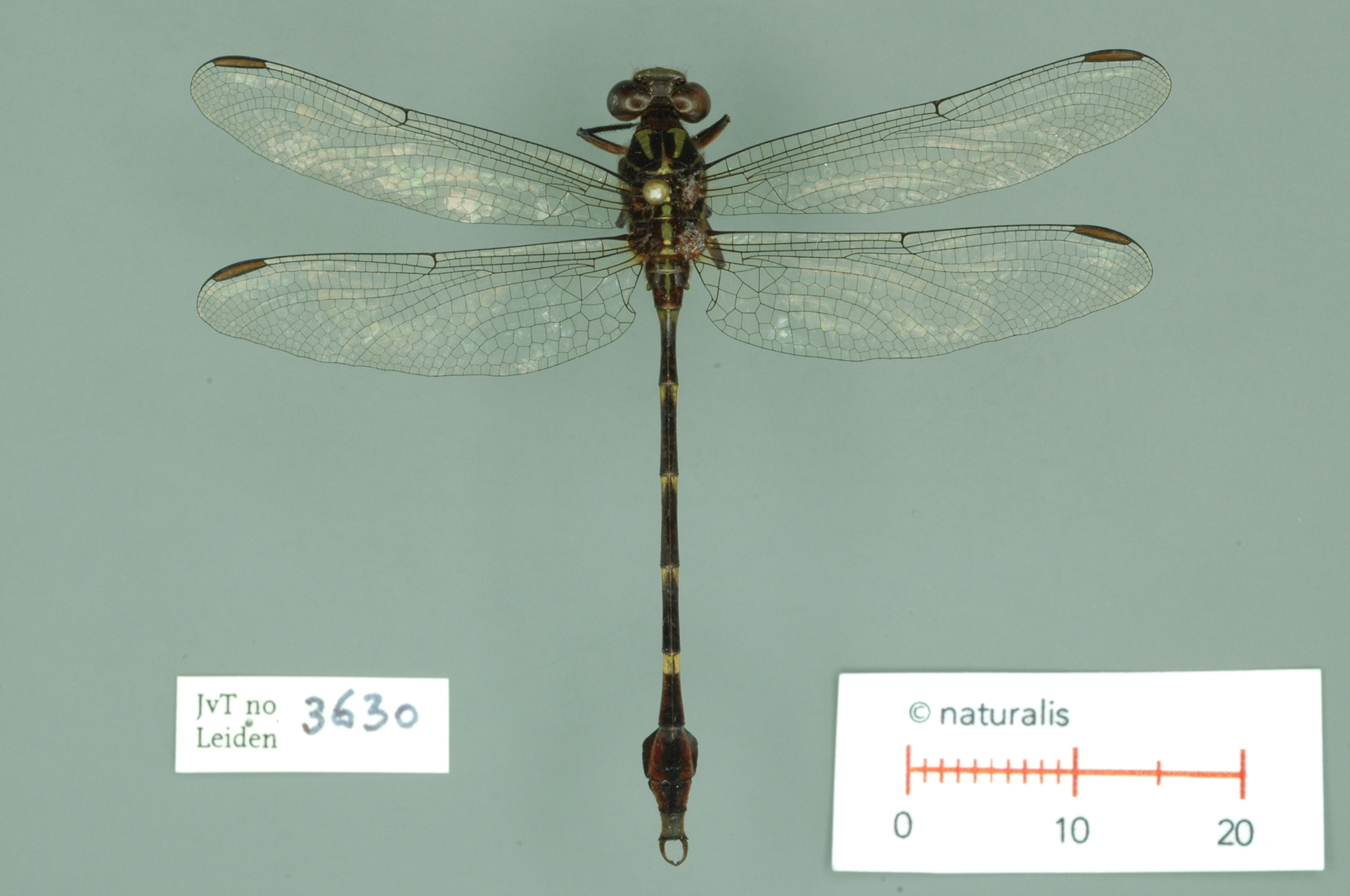

Scientific classification
- Kingdom: Animalia
- Phylum: Arthropoda
- Class: Insecta
- Order: Odonata
- Infraorder: Anisoptera
- Family: Gomphidae
- Genus: Phyllocycla
- Species: P. modesta

Binomial name
- Phyllocycla modesta Belle, 1970

= Phyllocycla modesta =

Species of insect

Phyllocycla modesta is a species from the genus Phyllocycla. The species was originally described by Jean Belle in 1970

== Description ==
The male holotype had a total length of 46 mm and the abdomen had a length of 36.5. The hind wing measured 26.5 cm. A female allotype had a total length of 45 mm and an abdomen of 33 mm. The hind wing measured 30 mm.

== Range ==
In its original description, the species was described as endemic to suriname, however, 33 georeferenced records suggest that the species range covers the northern part of the amazon in Brazil and the other Guianas.

== Taxonomy ==
Phyllocycla modesta is closely related to Phyllocycla signata.
