= Nepogomphoides stuhlmanni =

Conservation status
- Vulnerable (IUCN 3.1)

Scientific classification
- Kingdom: Animalia
- Phylum: Arthropoda
- Class: Insecta
- Order: Odonata
- Infraorder: Anisoptera
- Family: Gomphidae
- Genus: Nepogomphoides
- Species: N. stuhlmanni

Binomial name
- Nepogomphoides stuhlmanni Karsch, 1899

Species of dragonfly

Nepogomphoides stuhlmanni is a species of dragonfly in the family Gomphidae. It is found in Malawi, Mozambique, and Tanzania. Its natural habitats are subtropical or tropical moist lowland forests and rivers. It is threatened by habitat loss.
