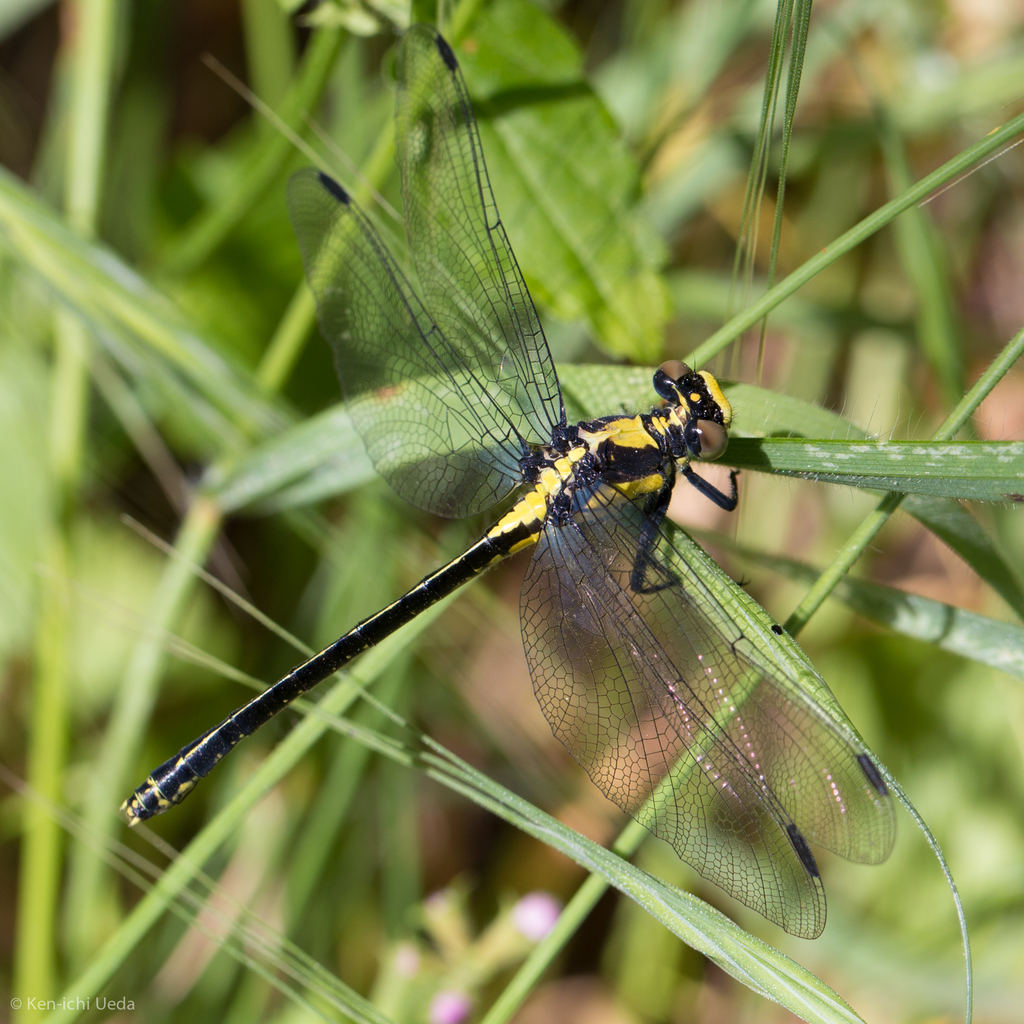
- Top view

Scientific classification
- Kingdom: Animalia
- Phylum: Arthropoda
- Clade: Pancrustacea
- Class: Insecta
- Order: Odonata
- Infraorder: Anisoptera
- Family: Gomphidae
- Genus: Octogomphus; Selys, 1873
- Species: O. specularis

Binomial name
- Octogomphus specularis (Hagen in Selys, 1859)

= Octogomphus =

Genus of dragonflies

Octogomphus, the grappletail, is a genus of club-tailed dragonflies found in North America, containing the single species Octogomphus specularis.

The Grappletail, not seen in British Columbia for 40 years, was re-discovered by citizen scientists in July 2020, during a hike in Davis Lake Provincial Park, near Mission, B.C.

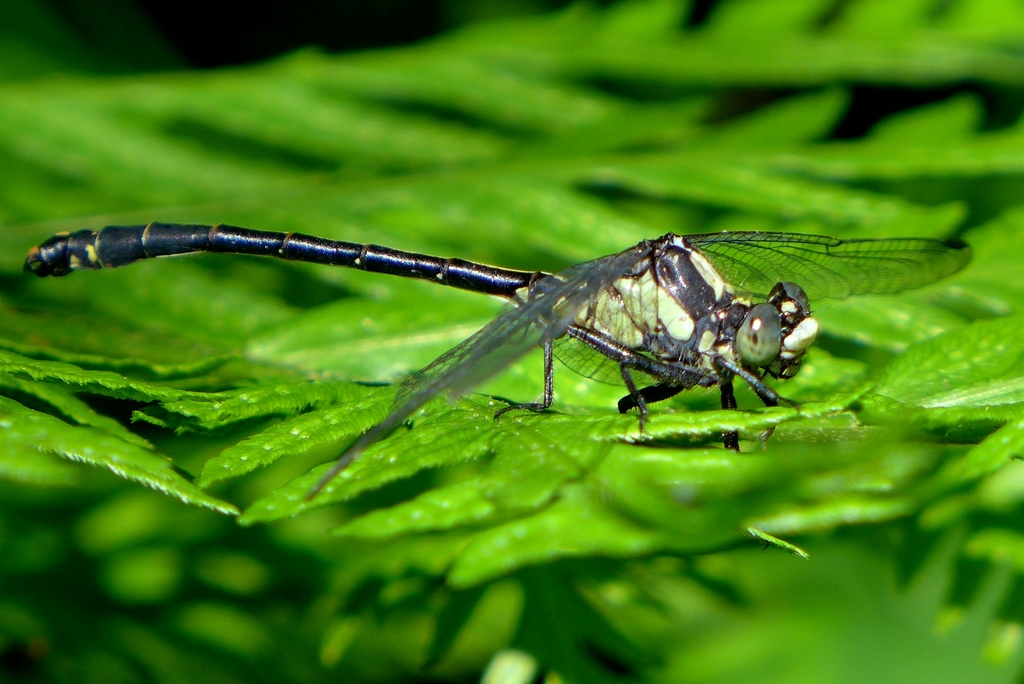
side view

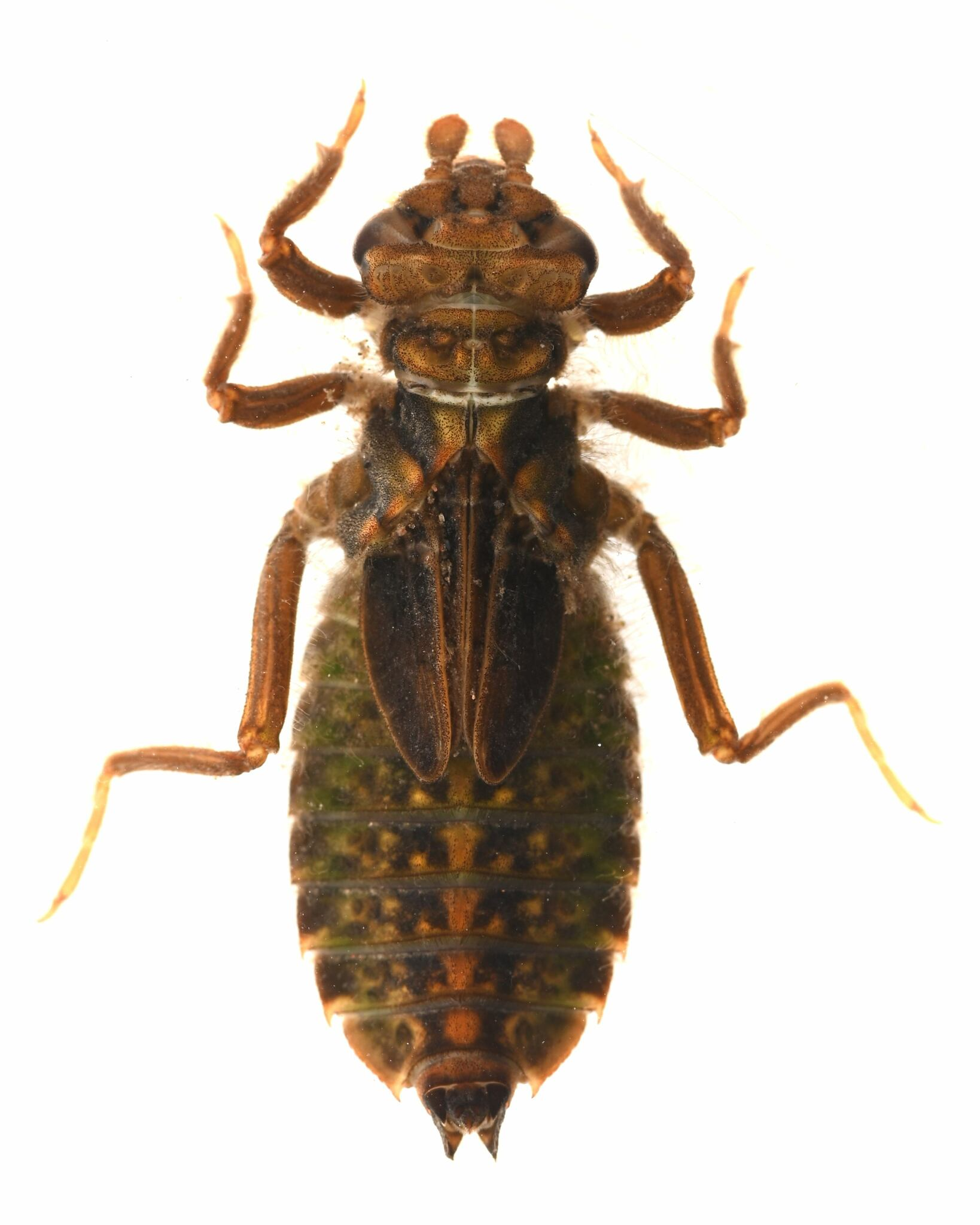
Grappletail nymph in Oregon
