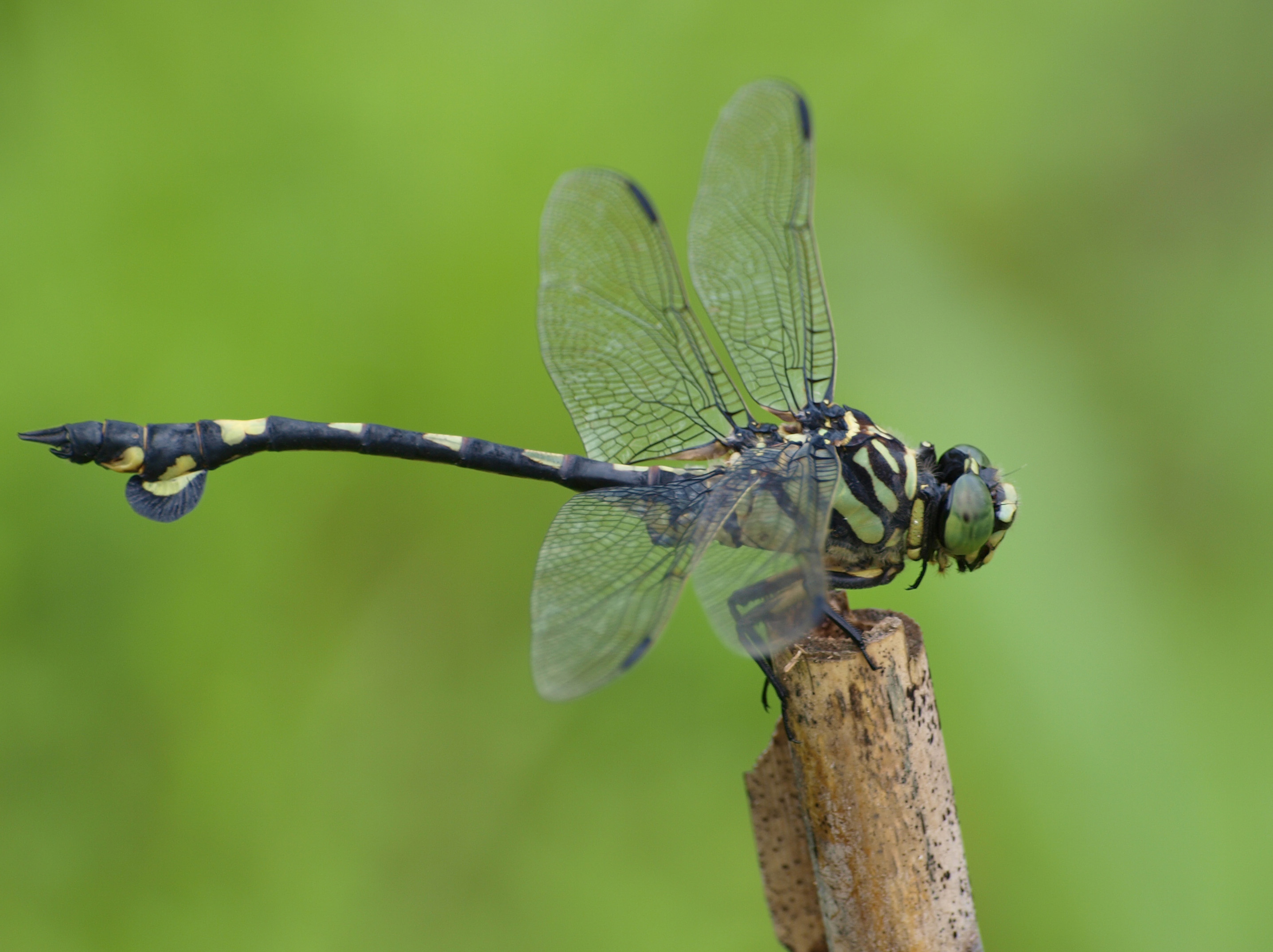

Conservation status
- Least Concern (IUCN 3.1)

Scientific classification
- Domain: Eukaryota
- Kingdom: Animalia
- Phylum: Arthropoda
- Class: Insecta
- Order: Odonata
- Infraorder: Anisoptera
- Family: Gomphidae
- Genus: Sinictinogomphus; Fraser, 1939
- Species: S. clavatus

Binomial name
- Sinictinogomphus clavatus (Fabricius, 1775)

= Sinictinogomphus clavatus =

Species of dragonfly

Sinictinogomphus clavatus, the golden flangetail, is a species of dragonfly in the clubtail family Gomphidae. It is the only species in the genus Sinictinogomphus.

S. clavatus is common over a large range from Nepal to Vietnam and eastern Russia. Its habitat is standing or still (lentic) water.
