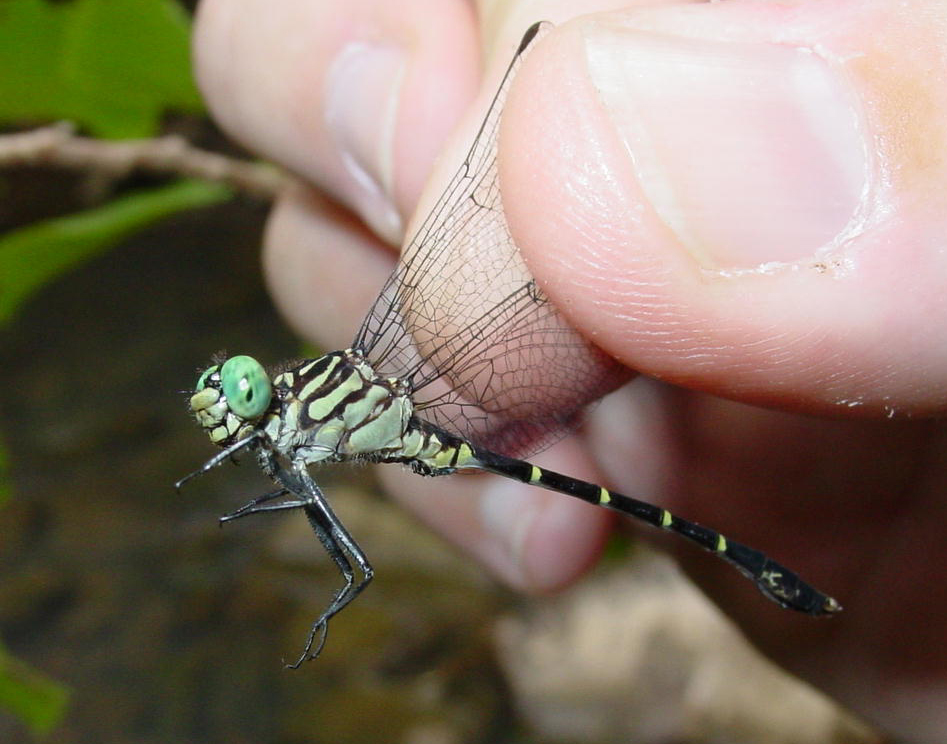
- Stylogomphus albistylus

Scientific classification
- Domain: Eukaryota
- Kingdom: Animalia
- Phylum: Arthropoda
- Class: Insecta
- Order: Odonata
- Infraorder: Anisoptera
- Family: Gomphidae
- Genus: Stylogomphus; Fraser, 1922

= Stylogomphus =

Genus of dragonflies

Stylogomphus is a genus of clubtails in the family Gomphidae. There are about 12 described species in Stylogomphus.

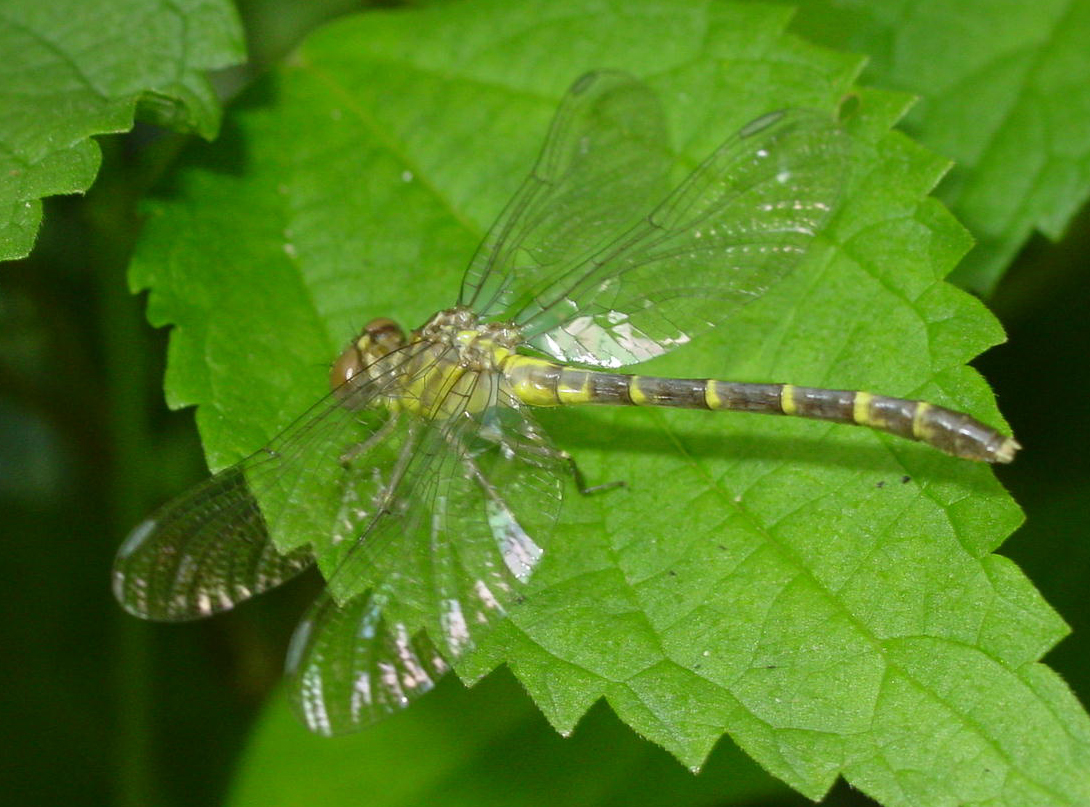
Stylogomphus albistylus

== Species ==
These 12 species belong to the genus Stylogomphus:

- Stylogomphus albistylus (Hagen in Selys, 1878)^{i c g b} (eastern least clubtail)
- Stylogomphus changi Asahina, 1968^{c g}
- Stylogomphus chunliuae Chao, 1954^{c g}
- Stylogomphus inglisi Fraser, 1922^{c g}
- Stylogomphus lawrenceae Yang & Davies, 1996^{c g}
- Stylogomphus lutantus Chao, 1983^{c g}
- Stylogomphus malayanus Sasamoto, 2001^{c g}
- Stylogomphus ryukyuanus Asahina, 1951^{c g}
- Stylogomphus shirozui Asahina, 1966^{c g}
- Stylogomphus sigmastylus Cook & Laudermilk, 2004^{i c g b} (interior least clubtail)
- Stylogomphus suzukii Matsumura in ..., 1926^{c g}
- Stylogomphus tantulus Chao, 1954^{c g}

Data sources: i = ITIS, c = Catalogue of Life, g = GBIF, b = Bugguide.net
