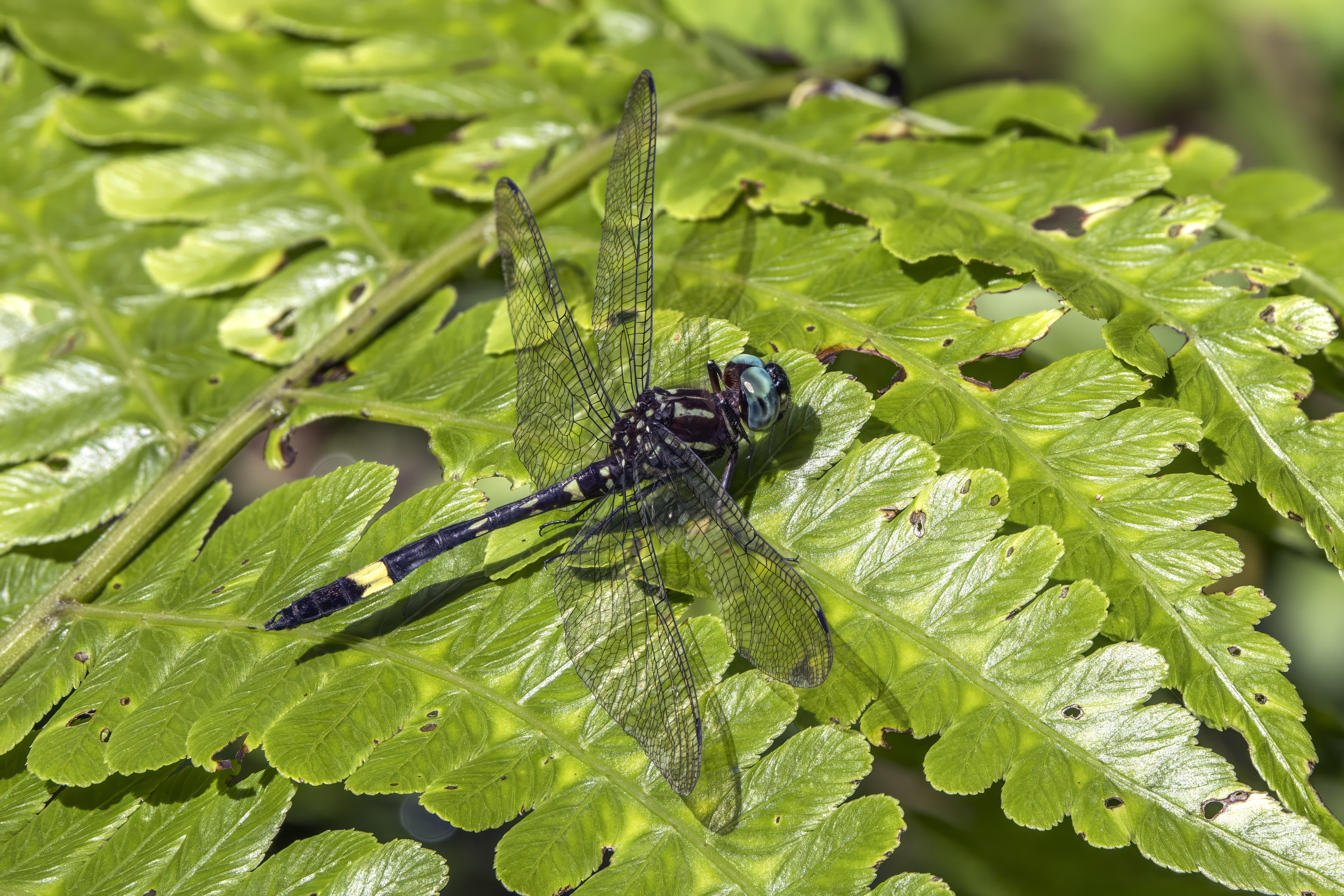

Scientific classification
- Domain: Eukaryota
- Kingdom: Animalia
- Phylum: Arthropoda
- Class: Insecta
- Order: Odonata
- Infraorder: Anisoptera
- Family: Libellulidae
- Genus: Brechmorhoga
- Species: B. rapax

Binomial name
- Brechmorhoga rapax Calvert, 1898

= Brechmorhoga rapax =

Species of dragonfly

Brechmorhoga rapax is a species of dragonfly in the genus Brechmorhoga. It is the most common member of the genus in Mesoamerica.
