= Tragogomphus =

Scientific classification
- Kingdom: Animalia
- Phylum: Arthropoda
- Class: Insecta
- Order: Odonata
- Infraorder: Anisoptera
- Family: Gomphidae
- Genus: Tragogomphus; Sjöstedt, 1900

Genus of dragonflies

Tragogomphus is a genus of dragonflies in the family Gomphidae.

The genus contains the following species:

- Tragogomphus aurivillii Sjöstedt, 1900
- Tragogomphus christinae Legrand, 1992
- Tragogomphus ellioti Legrand, 2002
- Tragogomphus mamfei Pinhey, 1961
- Tragogomphus tenaculatus (Fraser, 1926)
