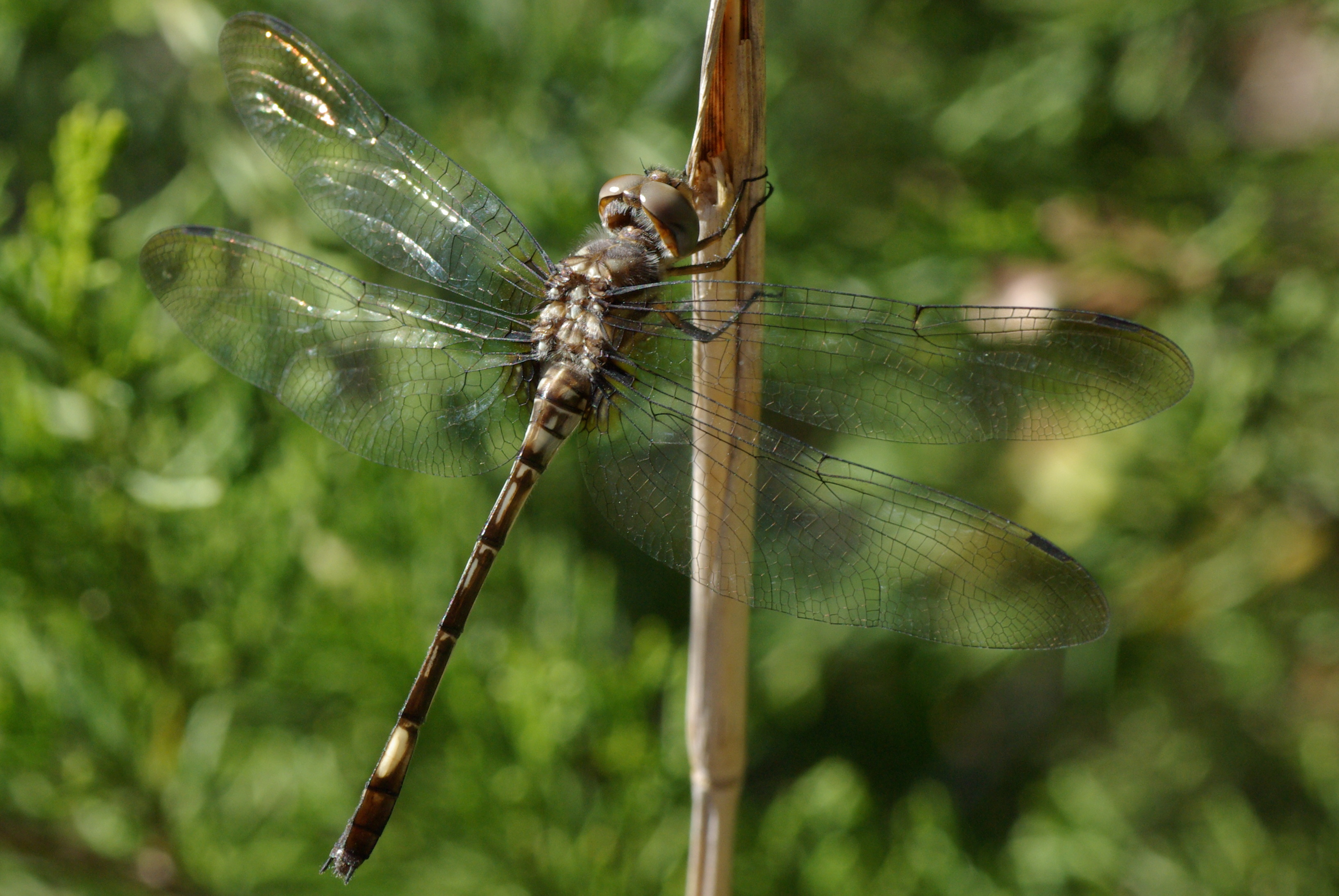

Scientific classification
- Kingdom: Animalia
- Phylum: Arthropoda
- Class: Insecta
- Order: Odonata
- Infraorder: Anisoptera
- Family: Libellulidae
- Genus: Brechmorhoga
- Species: B. mendax

Binomial name
- Brechmorhoga mendax (Hagen, 1861)
- Range of Brechmorhoga mendax

= Pale-faced clubskimmer =

Species of dragonfly

The pale-faced clubskimmer (Brechmorhoga mendax) is a dragonfly of the family Libellulidae. Total length is 52 to 64mm.
