= Diastatomma =

Scientific classification
- Kingdom: Animalia
- Phylum: Arthropoda
- Class: Insecta
- Order: Odonata
- Infraorder: Anisoptera
- Family: Gomphidae
- Genus: Diastatomma; Burmeister, 1839

Genus of dragonflies

Diastatomma is a genus of dragonfly in the family Gomphidae. It contains the following species:

- Diastatomma bicolor Selys, 1869
- Diastatomma gamblesi Legrand, 1992
- Diastatomma multilineata Fraser, 1949
- Diastatomma ruwenzorica Pinhey, 1961
- Diastatomma selysi Schouteden, 1934
- Diastatomma soror Schouteden, 1934
- Diastatomma tricolor (Palisot de Beauvois, 1807)
