= Perigomphus =

Scientific classification
- Kingdom: Animalia
- Phylum: Arthropoda
- Class: Insecta
- Order: Odonata
- Infraorder: Anisoptera
- Family: Gomphidae
- Genus: Perigomphus; Belle, 1972

Genus of dragonflies

Perigomphus is a genus of dragonfly in the family Gomphidae. It contains the following species:

- Perigomphus angularis Tennessen, 2011
- Perigomphus pallidistylus Belle, 1972 – pegtail
