= Isomma =

Scientific classification
- Kingdom: Animalia
- Phylum: Arthropoda
- Class: Insecta
- Order: Odonata
- Infraorder: Anisoptera
- Family: Gomphidae
- Genus: Isomma; Selys, 1892

Genus of dragonflies

Isomma is a genus of dragonflies in the family Gomphidae. It is endemic to Madagascar and contains only two species:

- Isomma elouardi Legrand, 2003
- Isomma hieroglyphicum Selys, 1892
