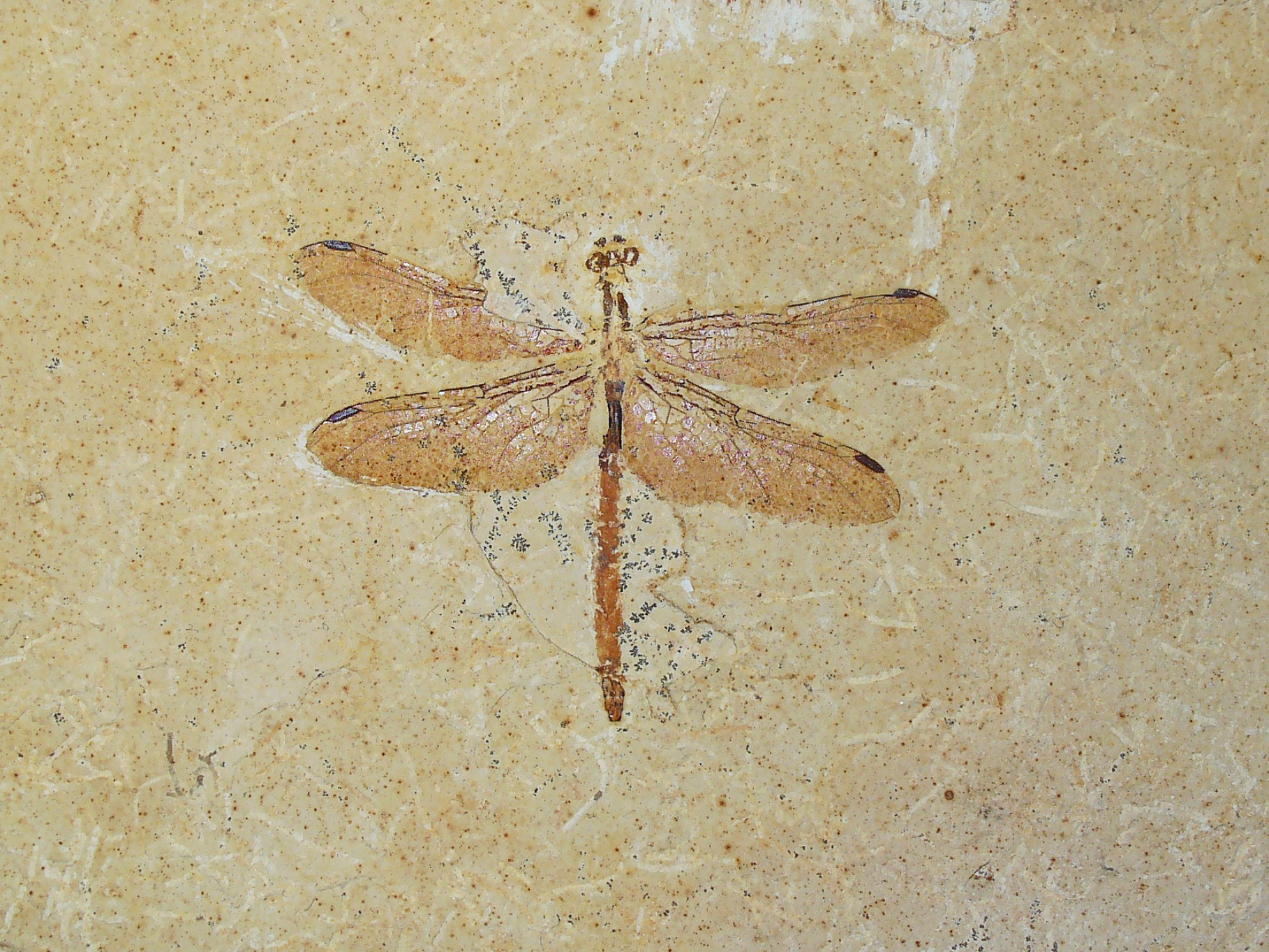
- Cordulagomphus

Scientific classification
- Kingdom: Animalia
- Phylum: Arthropoda
- Clade: Pancrustacea
- Class: Insecta
- Order: Odonata
- Infraorder: Anisoptera
- Family: †Proterogomphidae; Bechly et al. 1998

Genera
- †Cordulagomphus; †Cratogomphus; †Liaoninglanthus; †Lingomphus; †Paracordulagomphus; †Pauciphlebia; †Proterogomphus

= Proterogomphidae =

Proterogomphidae Temporal range: Cretaceous

Extinct family of dragonflies

Proterogomphidae is a dragonfly family from the Cretaceous.
