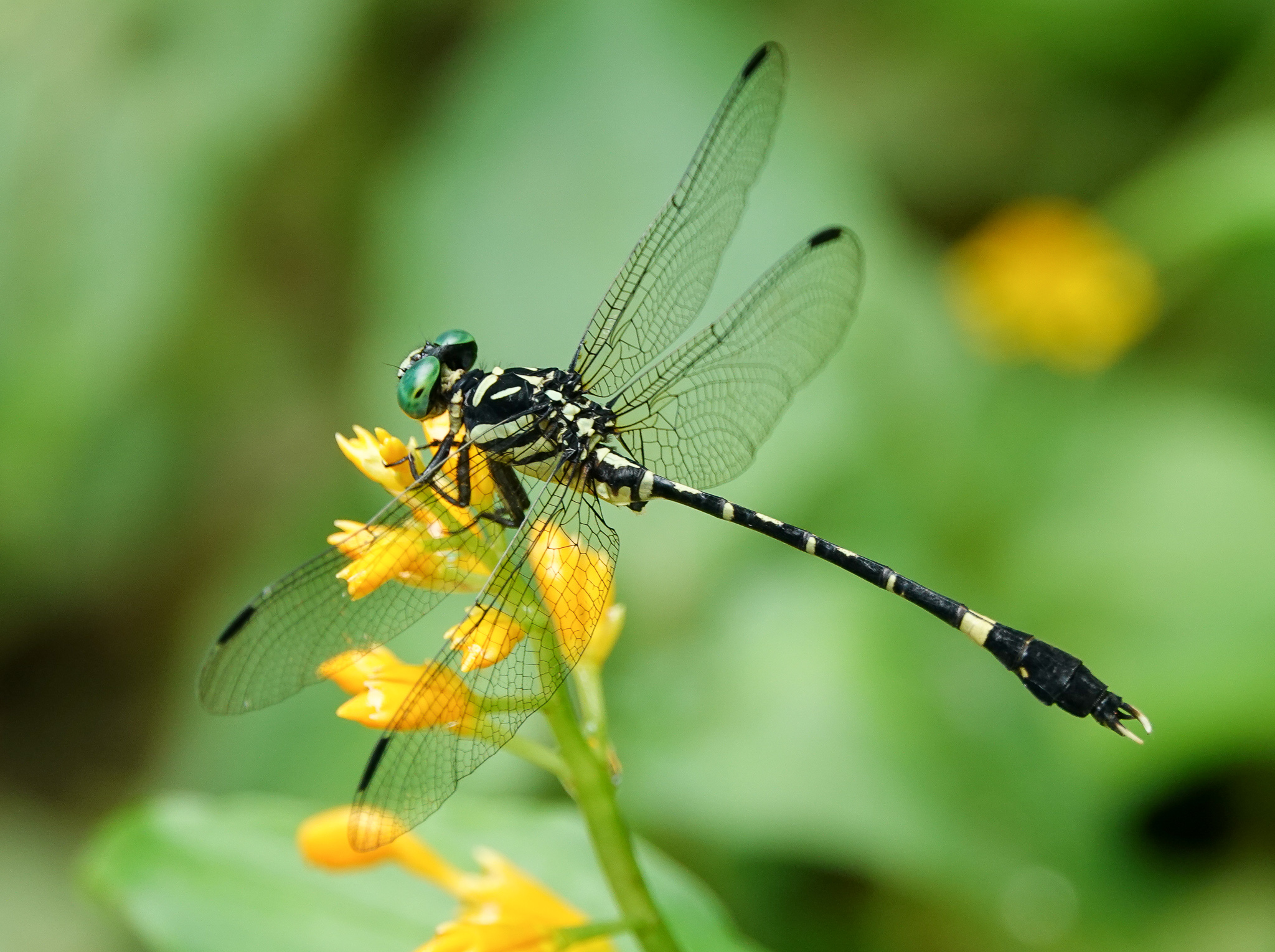
- Orientogomphus indicus

Scientific classification
- Kingdom: Animalia
- Phylum: Arthropoda
- Class: Insecta
- Order: Odonata
- Infraorder: Anisoptera
- Superfamily: Gomphoidea
- Family: Gomphidae
- Genus: Orientogomphus; Chao & Xu, 1987

= Orientogomphus =

Genus of dragonflies

External image
- Images at iNaturalist

Orientogomphus is a genus of dragonflies in the family Gomphidae and subfamily Onychogomphinae, erected by Chao Zhao Xiufu and Xu Jianfei in 1987. Species have been recorded from China, Indochina and western Malesia.

== Species ==
The Global Biodiversity Information Facility lists:

1. Orientogomphus aemulus (Lieftinck, 1937)
2. Orientogomphus armatus Chao & Xu, 1987
3. Orientogomphus circularis (Selys, 1894)
4. Orientogomphus earnshawi (Fraser, 1924)
5. Orientogomphus indicus (Lahiri, 1987)
6. Orientogomphus minor (Laidlaw, 1931)
7. Orientogomphus naninus (Förster, 1905)
