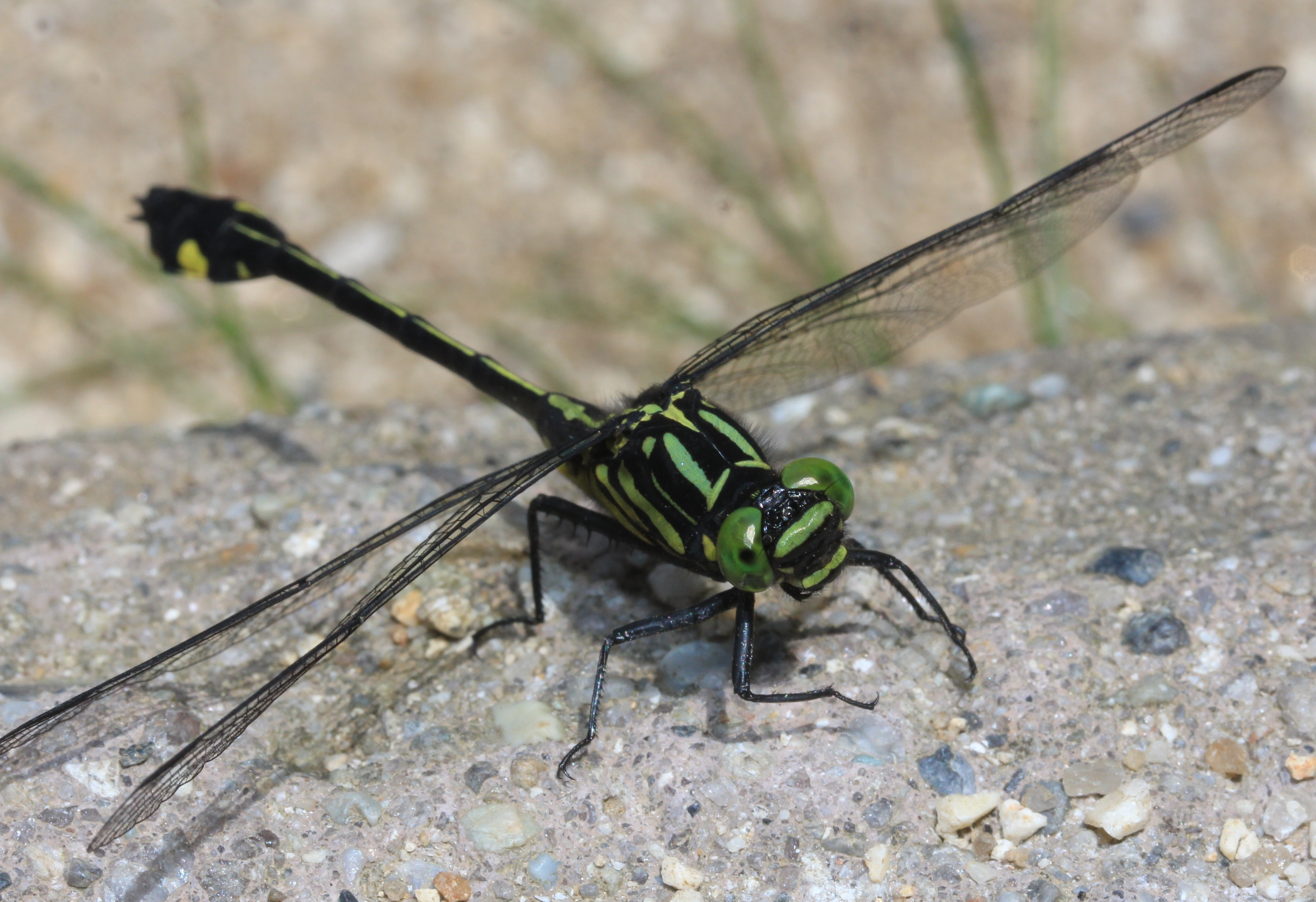
- Anisogomphus maacki

Scientific classification
- Kingdom: Animalia
- Phylum: Arthropoda
- Class: Insecta
- Order: Odonata
- Infraorder: Anisoptera
- Family: Gomphidae
- Genus: Anisogomphus; Selys, 1858

= Anisogomphus =

Genus of dragonflies

Anisogomphus is a genus of dragonfly in the family Gomphidae. It contains the following species:

- Anisogomphus anderi Lieftinck, 1948
- Anisogomphus bivittatus Selys, 1854
- Anisogomphus caudalis Fraser, 1926
- Anisogomphus chaoi Liu, 1991
- Anisogomphus flavifacies Klots, 1947
- Anisogomphus forresti (Morton, 1928)
- Anisogomphus fujianensis Zhou & Wu, 1992
- Anisogomphus jinggangshanus Liu, 1991
- Anisogomphus koxingai Chao, 1954
- Anisogomphus maacki (Selys, 1872)
- Anisogomphus nitidus Yang & Davies, 1993
- Anisogomphus occipitalis (Selys, 1854)
- Anisogomphus orites Laidlaw, 1922
- Anisogomphus pinratani Hämäläinen, 1991
- Anisogomphus resortus Yang & Davies, 1996
- Anisogomphus solitaris Lieftinck, 1971
- Anisogomphus vulvalis Yousuf & Yunes, 1977
- Anisogomphus wuzhishanus Chao, 1982
- Anisogomphus yunnanensis Zhou & Wu, 1992
