= Brechmorhoga praecox =

Conservation status
- Least Concern (IUCN 3.1)

Scientific classification
- Kingdom: Animalia
- Phylum: Arthropoda
- Class: Insecta
- Order: Odonata
- Infraorder: Anisoptera
- Family: Libellulidae
- Genus: Brechmorhoga
- Species: B. praecox

Binomial name
- Brechmorhoga praecox (Hagen, 1861)

Species of dragonfly

Brechmorhoga praecox, the slender clubskimmer, is a species of skimmer in the dragonfly family Libellulidae. It is found in Central America and South America.

The IUCN conservation status of Brechmorhoga praecox is "LC", least concern, with no immediate threat to the species' survival. The population is stable. The IUCN status was reviewed in 2017.

== Subspecies ==
These three subspecies belong to the species Brechmorhoga praecox:

- Brechmorhoga praecox grenadensis Kirby, 1894
- Brechmorhoga praecox postlobata Calvert, 1898
- Brechmorhoga praecox praecox (Hagen, 1861)
