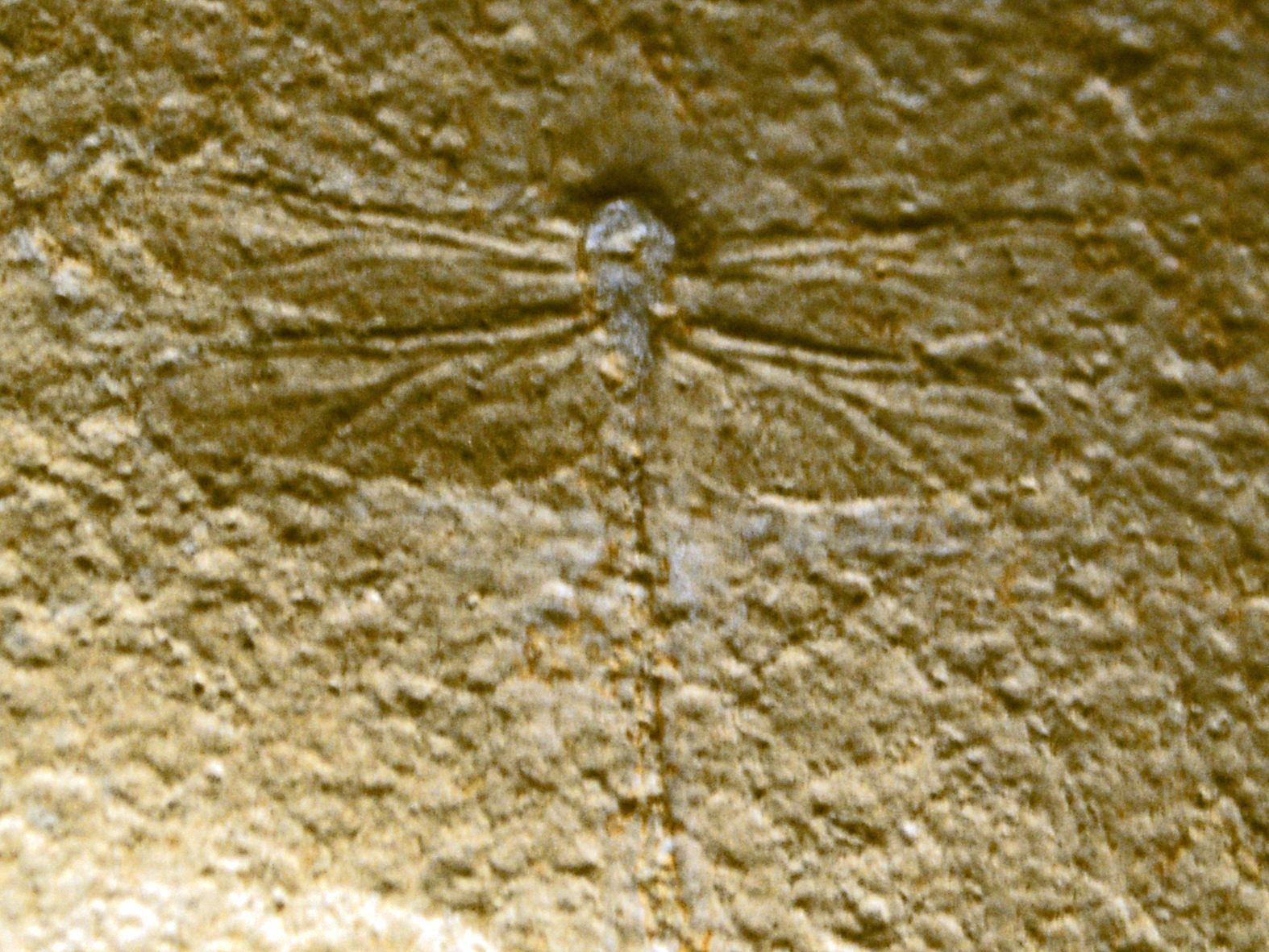
- Fossil specimen of Nannogomphus bavaricus from Germany, on display at Galerie de paléontologie et d'anatomie comparée in Paris

Scientific classification
- Kingdom: Animalia
- Phylum: Arthropoda
- Class: Insecta
- Order: Odonata
- Infraorder: Anisoptera
- Family: Gomphidae
- Genus: †Nannogomphus; Handlirsch 1906

= Nannogomphus =

Nannogomphus Temporal range: Jurassic

Fossil genus of insects

Nannogomphus is an extinct genus of fossil odonates belonging to the family Gomphidae.

These fast-moving volant carnivore-insectivores lived during the Jurassic period in Germany, from 150.8 to 145.5 Ma.

== Species ==
- †Nannogomphus bavaricus Handlirsch 1906
- †Nannogomphus buergeri Bechly 2003
- †Nannogomphus vetustus Hagen 1848
