= Nepogomphoides =

Scientific classification
- Kingdom: Animalia
- Phylum: Arthropoda
- Class: Insecta
- Order: Odonata
- Infraorder: Anisoptera
- Family: Gomphidae
- Genus: Nepogomphoides

Genus of dragonflies

Nepogomphoides is a genus of dragonfly in the family Gomphidae. It contains the following species:

- Nepogomphoides stuhlmanni
