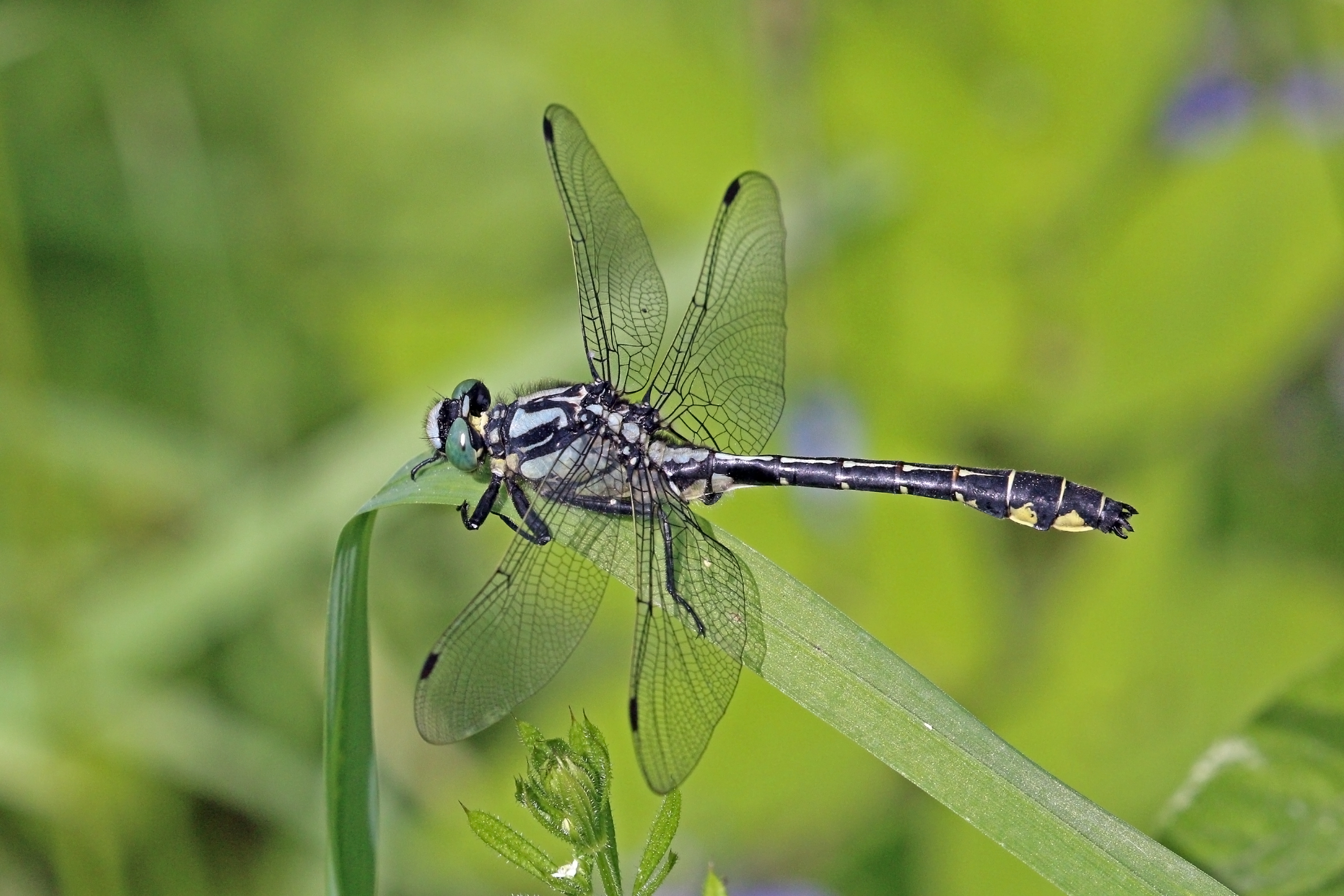
- male, Estonia

Conservation status
- Least Concern (IUCN 3.1)

Scientific classification
- Kingdom: Animalia
- Phylum: Arthropoda
- Class: Insecta
- Order: Odonata
- Infraorder: Anisoptera
- Family: Gomphidae
- Genus: Gomphus
- Species: G. vulgatissimus

Binomial name
- Gomphus vulgatissimus (Linnaeus, 1758)

= Gomphus vulgatissimus =

Species of dragonfly

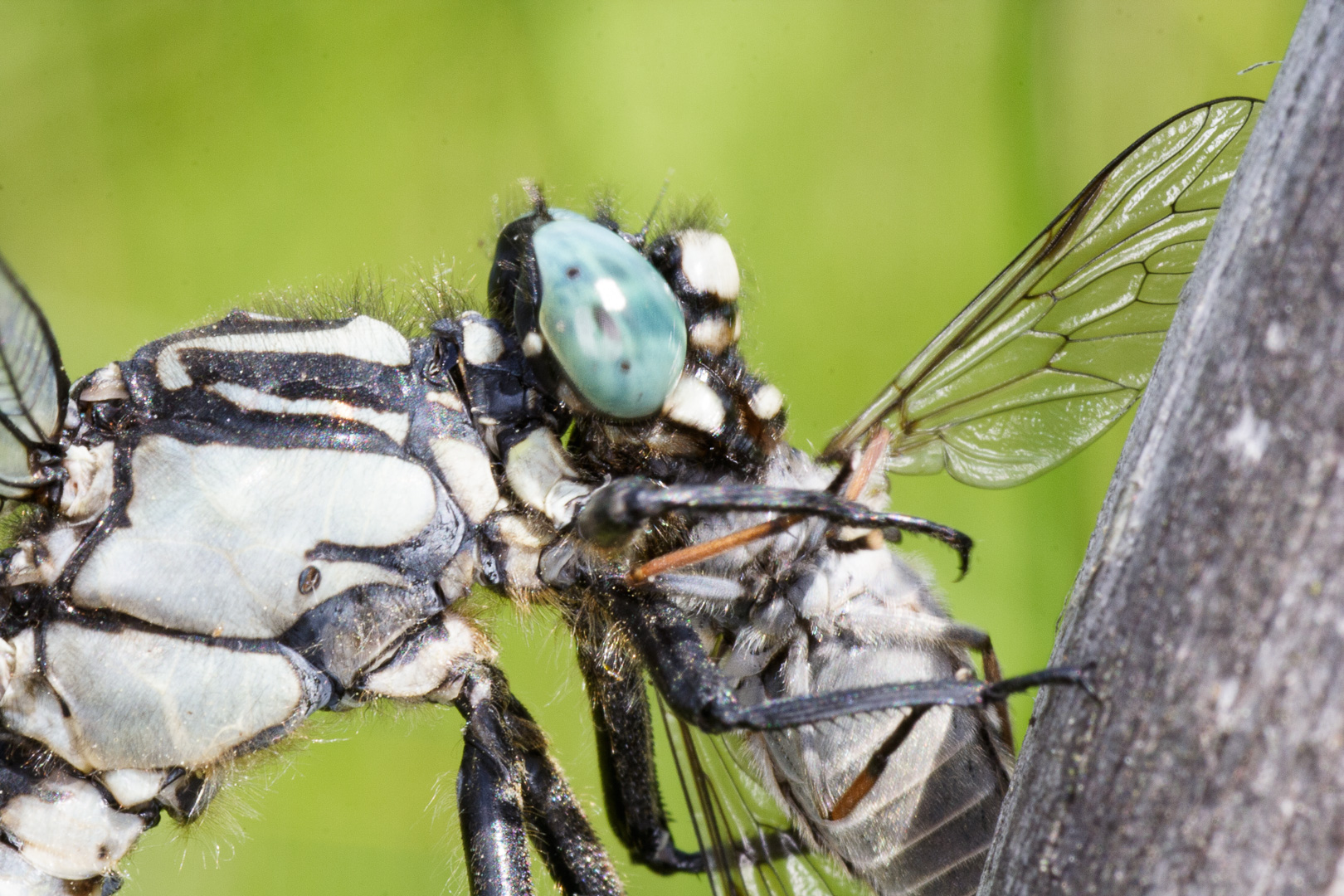
Gomphus vulgatissimus with prey

Gomphus vulgatissimus, the common clubtail, is a medium-sized (wingspan 6 –7 cm.) species of dragonfly in the family Gomphidae. It is found in most of Europe, and is present now in the south of France. Its natural habitats are clean, slow moving streaming rivers and creeks with sandy soil. It can be seen from mid-April in the south to August. Once they hatched out of water, they live shortly. As the common name suggests, this medium-sized species has a distinctive club-shaped abdomen. The males are black with extensive yellow markings on the thorax and abdomen which turn green as the insect ages. The females are black with extensive yellow markings. In the British Isles the adult flight period extends from mid May to early July.

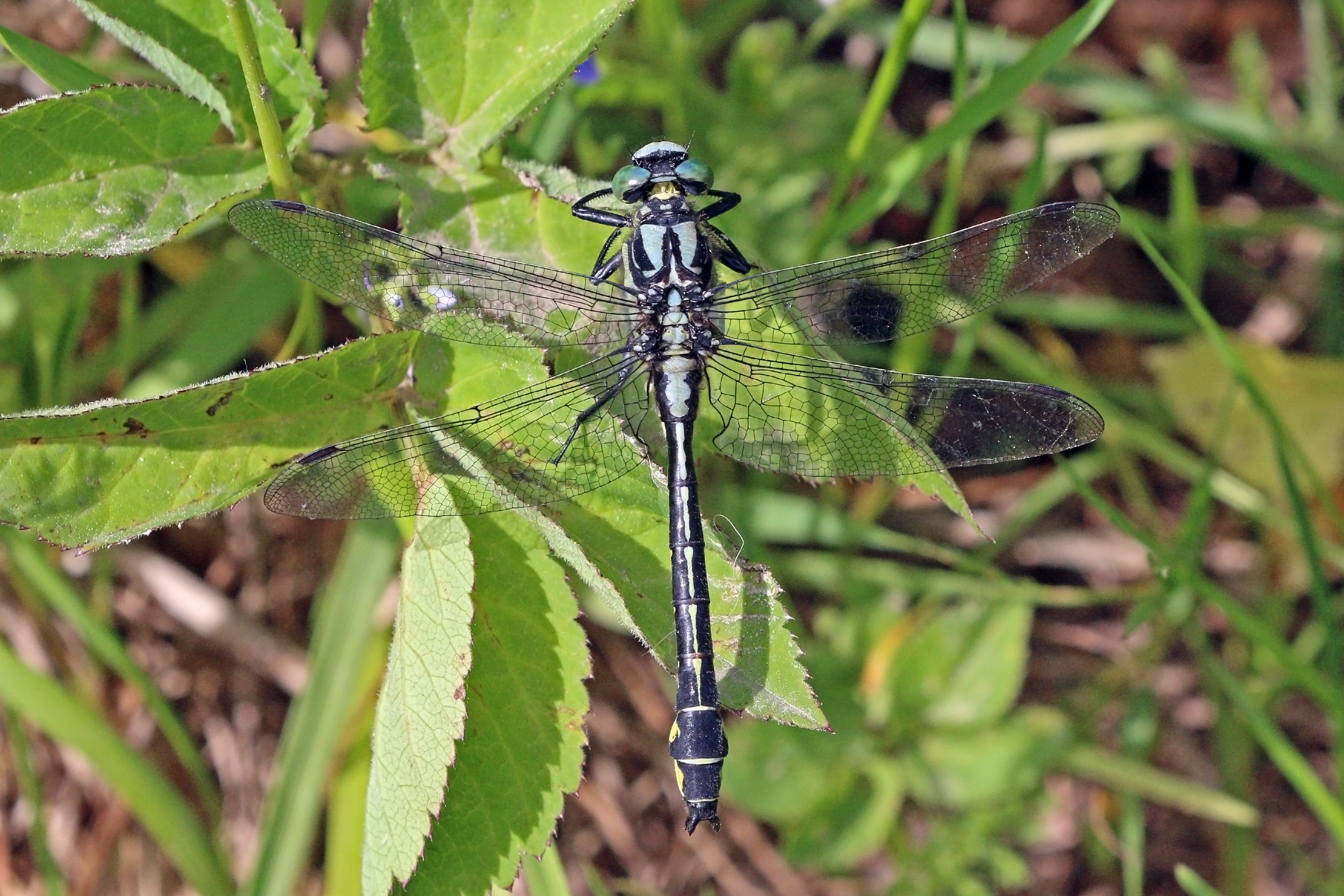
male, Estonia

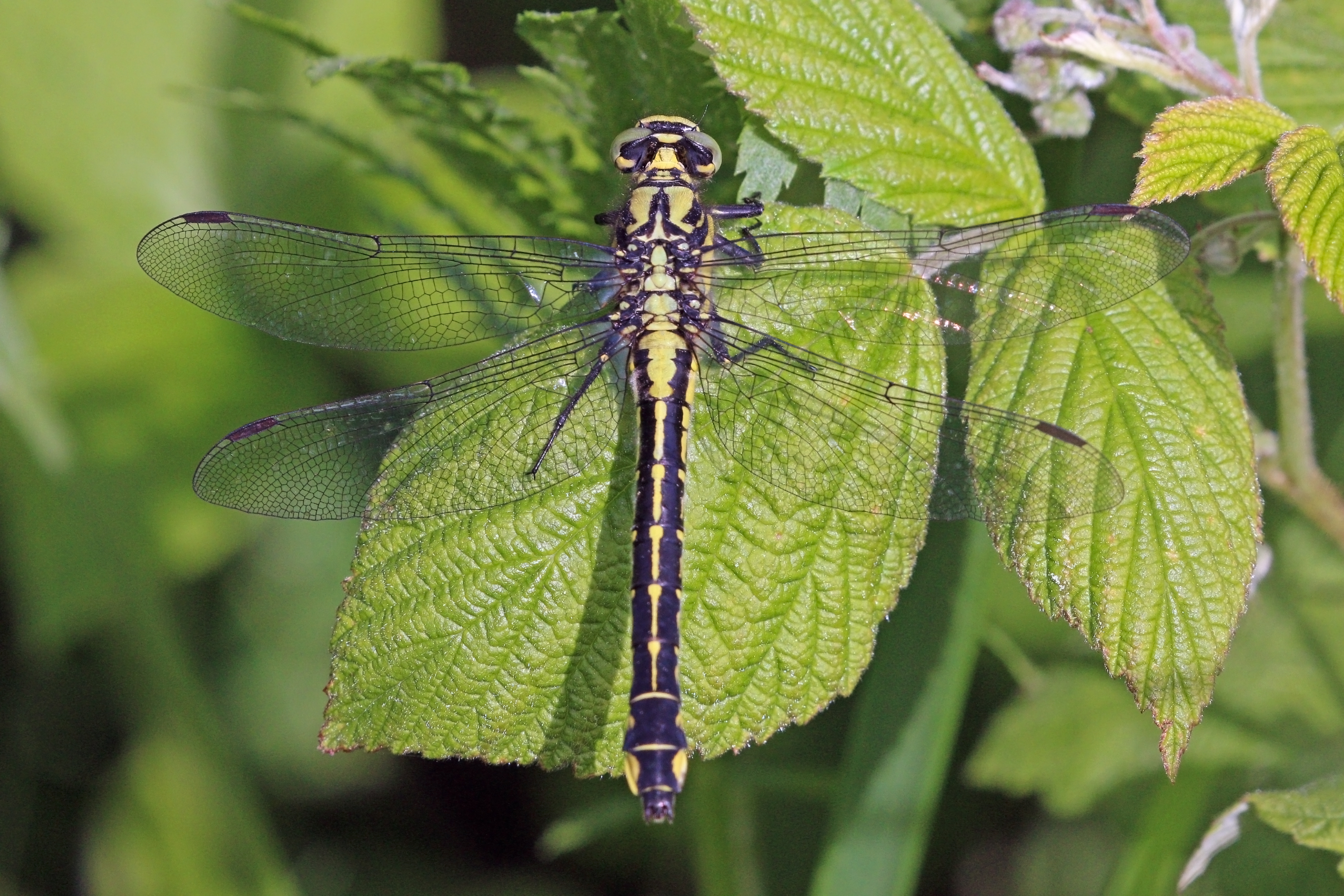
female, Estonia

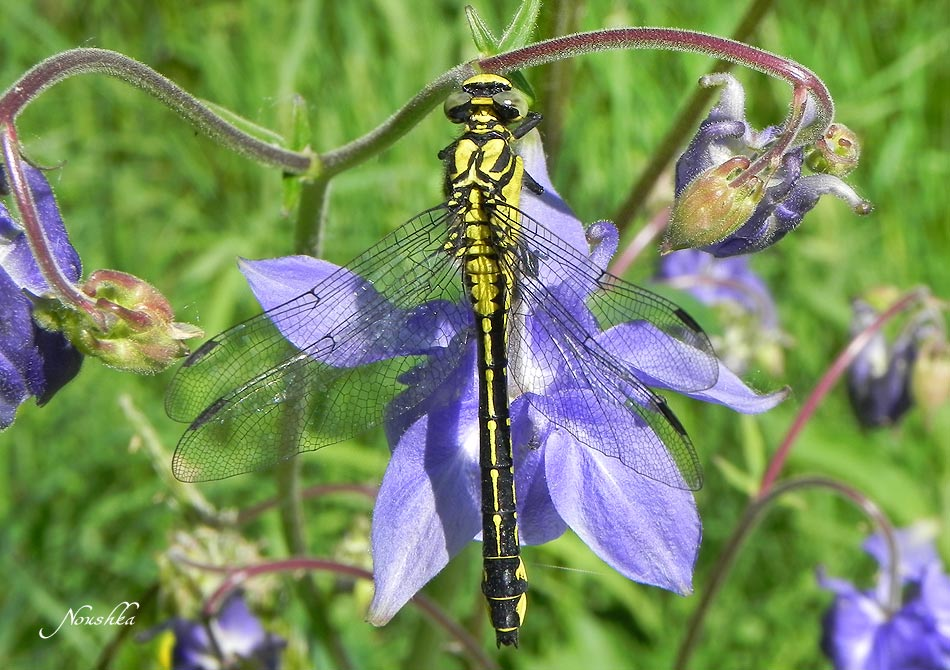
Gomphus vulgatissimus, female, South France

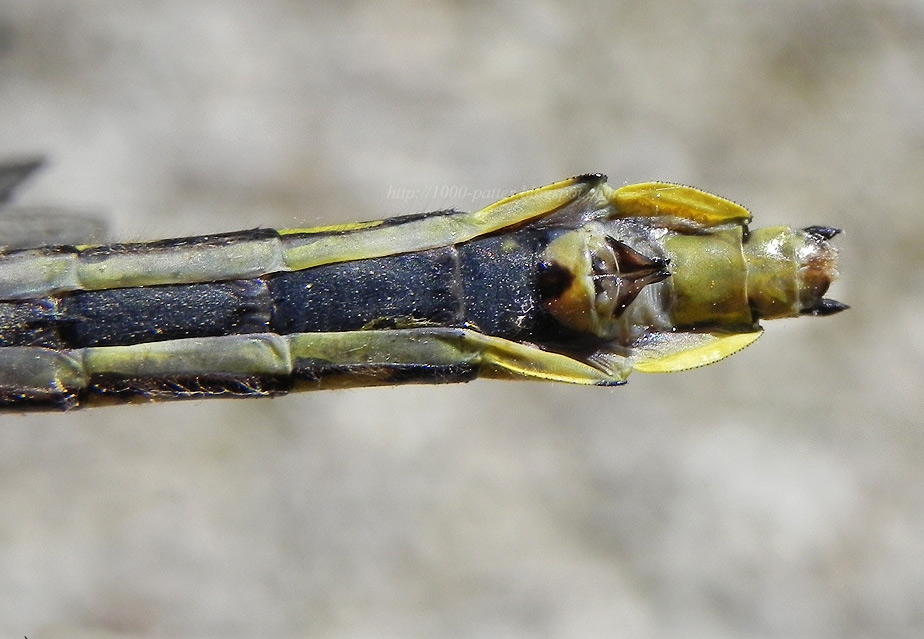
Copulatory organs of a female
