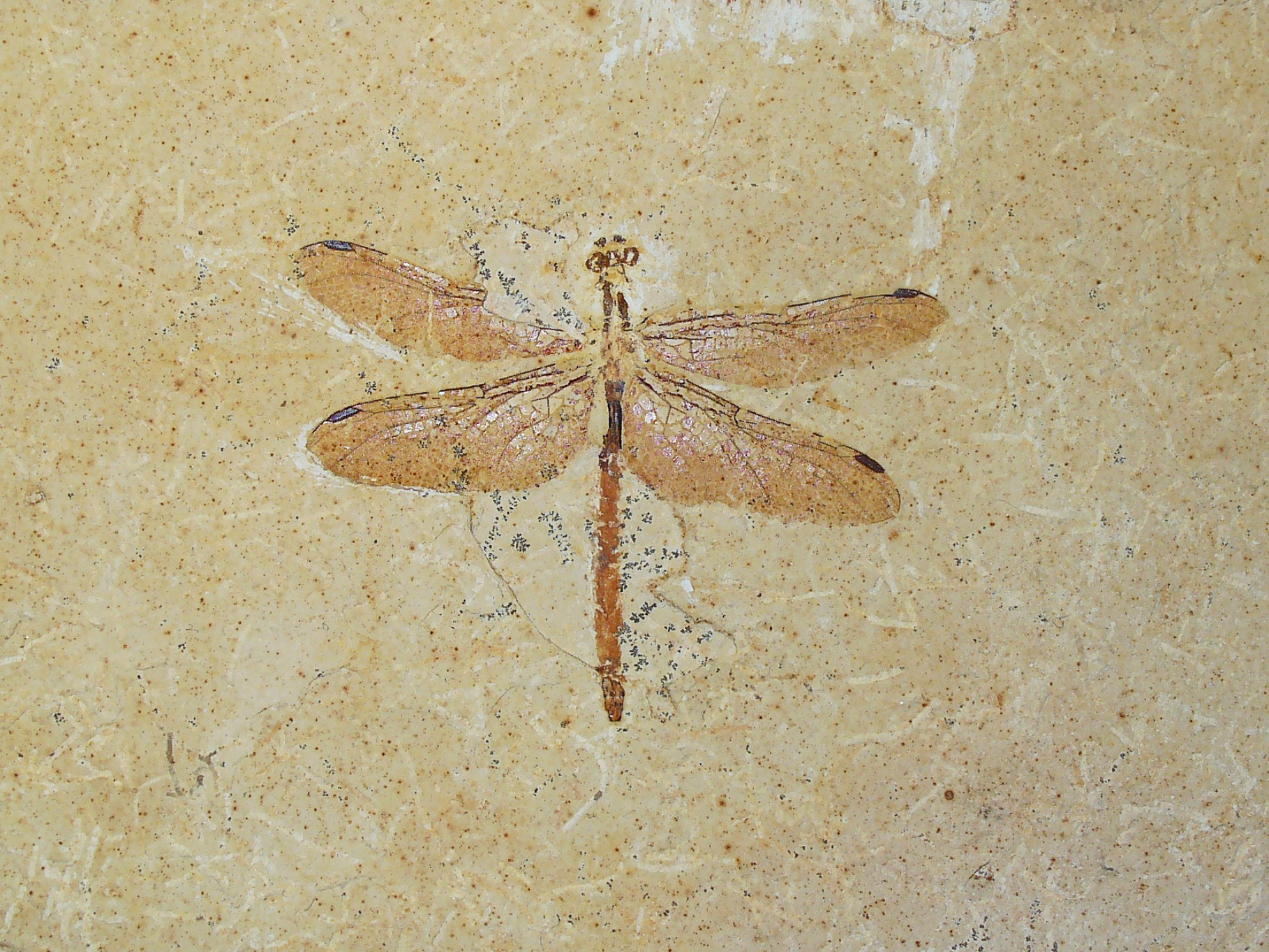
- A fossil of Cordulagomphus

Scientific classification
- Kingdom: Animalia
- Phylum: Arthropoda
- Clade: Pancrustacea
- Class: Insecta
- Order: Odonata
- Infraorder: Anisoptera
- Family: †Proterogomphidae
- Genus: †Cordulagomphus; Carle & Wighton, 1990

Type species
- †Cordulagomphus tuberculatus Carle & Wighton, 1990

Other species
- †C. europaeus Vernoux et al., 2010; †C. fenestratus Carle & Wighton, 1990; †C. hanneloreae Bechly, 2007; †C. michaeli Bechly, 2007; †C. primaerensis Petrulevicius & Martins-Neto, 2007; †C. senckenbergi Bechly, 1998; †C. winkelhoferi Bechly, 2007; †C. xavieri Nel & Escuillé, 1994

= Cordulagomphus =

Cordulagomphus Temporal range: Barremian-Aptian, ~125.77–113 Ma

Extinct genus of dragonflies

Cordulagomphus is an extinct genus of dragonflies from the Early Cretaceous. It contains nine species; most are from the Crato Formation of Brazil, though C. europaeus is from the Weald Clay of England. C. xavieri, C. senckenbergi, C. primaerensis, and C. michaeli are classified in subgenus Procordulagomphus. Caririlabia santanensis was originally described as a species of Cordulagomphus.
