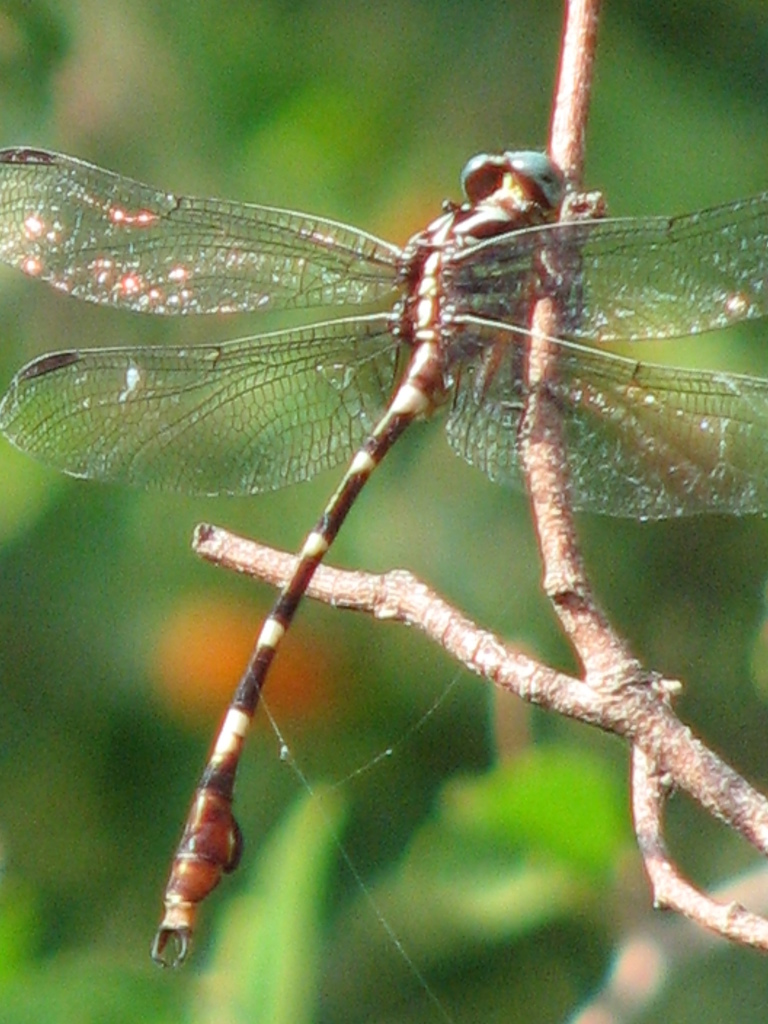

Scientific classification
- Kingdom: Animalia
- Phylum: Arthropoda
- Class: Insecta
- Order: Odonata
- Infraorder: Anisoptera
- Family: Gomphidae
- Genus: Phyllocycla; Calvert, 1948

= Phyllocycla =

Genus of dragonflies

Phyllocycla is a genus of clubtails in the family Gomphidae, commonly known as the lesser forceptails. There are at least 30 described species in Phyllocycla.

== See also ==
- List of Phyllocycla species
