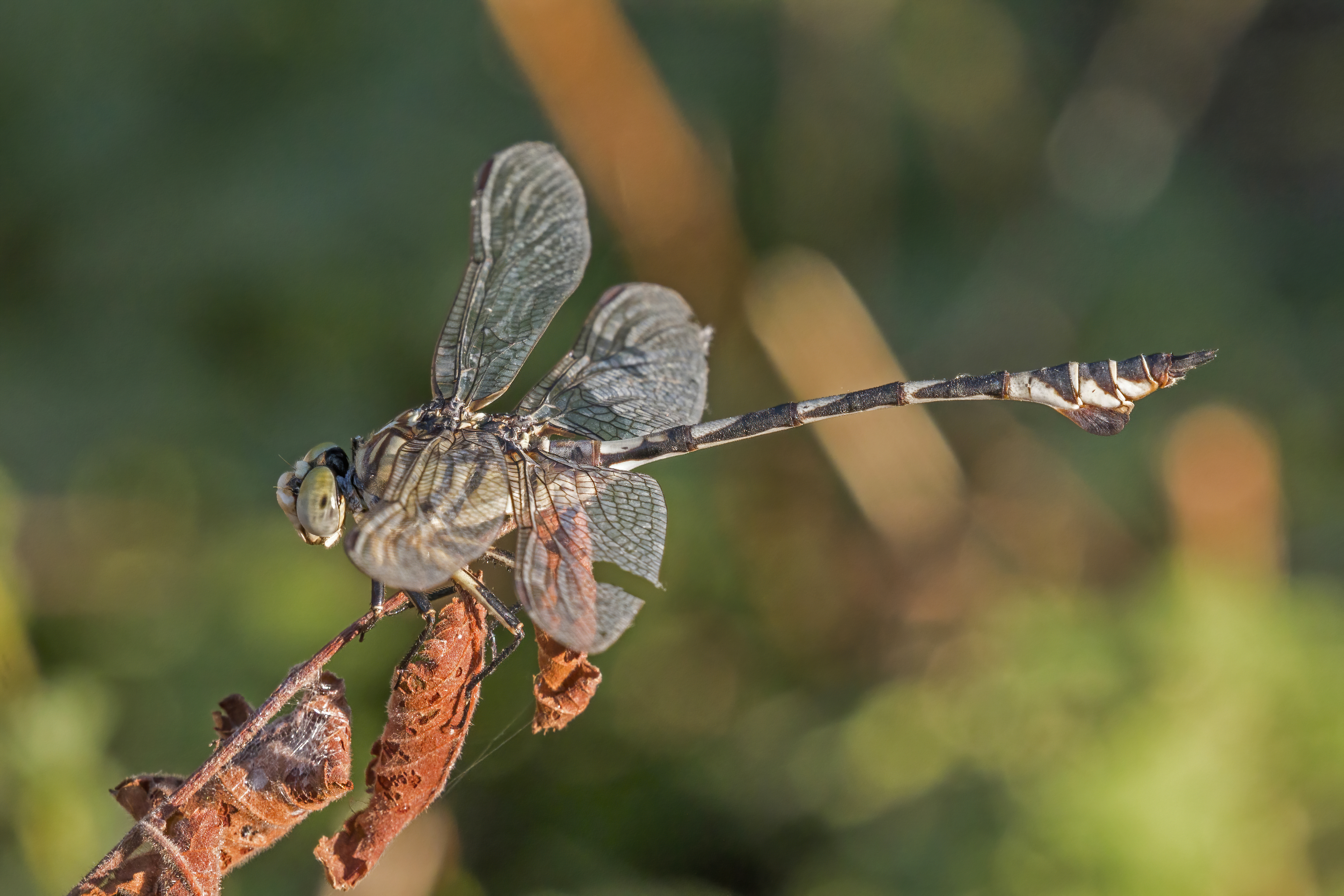
- Bladetail, male, Lindenia tetraphylla North Macedonia

Scientific classification
- Kingdom: Animalia
- Phylum: Arthropoda
- Clade: Pancrustacea
- Class: Insecta
- Order: Odonata
- Infraorder: Anisoptera
- Superfamily: Gomphoidea
- Family: Gomphidae; Rambur, 1842

Genera
- See text

Synonyms
- Lindeniidae Yakobson and Bianchi, 1905

= Gomphidae =

Gomphidae Temporal range: Barremian–Recent

Family of dragonflies

Gomphidae is a family of dragonflies commonly known as clubtails or club-tailed dragonflies. The family is placed in the superfamily Gomphoidea, together with Petaluridae.

The family comprises about 100 genera and about 1,000 species distributed across North and South America, Europe, Asia, Australia and Africa.

The common name clubtail refers to the club-like widening near the end of the abdomen, a feature that is more pronounced in males and absent in some species.

== Description and biology ==
Gomphids are medium-sized to large dragonflies characterised by their widely separated eyes, robust bodies and, in many species, the swollen tip of the abdomen that gives the family its common name. The club is most developed in males and is absent or only weakly developed in some species. Adults are typically yellow, green or black, often with contrasting dark markings, and many species perch horizontally on rocks, logs or streamside vegetation.

Most gomphids inhabit streams and rivers, although some species occur around ponds and lakes. Adults usually remain close to their breeding sites, making short, rapid flights between perches, while newly emerged adults often disperse to nearby woodland before returning to water to breed. In temperate regions emergence is typically concentrated in spring or early summer, whereas tropical species often emerge soon after the onset of the rainy season.

The larvae are aquatic predators that live in sand, gravel or mud on the beds of streams, rivers and other freshwater habitats. Most species burrow into the substrate with only the eyes and upper body exposed while waiting to ambush prey. Depending on the species, larval development usually takes one to three years, although in some large species it may extend to five years or more.

Because their larvae require clean, well-oxygenated freshwater and are sensitive to habitat disturbance, many gomphids are regarded as indicators of river health. Loss of riparian vegetation, sedimentation and water pollution have contributed to declines in a number of species.

== Taxonomy ==
Gomphidae was established by Rambur in 1842.

The family currently comprises about 100 genera and about 1,000 described species, making it one of the largest families of dragonflies.

In the classification of extant Odonata proposed by Carter and colleagues (2026), Gomphidae is one of the two families placed in the superfamily Gomphoidea, together with Petaluridae.

=== Genera ===
The following genera are currently placed in Gomphidae:

- Acrogomphus Laidlaw, 1925
- Agriogomphus Selys, 1869
- Amphigomphus Chao, 1954
- Anisogomphus Selys, 1858
- Anormogomphus Selys, 1854
- Antipodogomphus Fraser, 1951
- Aphylla Selys, 1854
- Archaeogomphus Williamson, 1919
- Arigomphus Needham, 1897
- Armagomphus Carle, 1986
- Asahinagomphus Karube, 2021
- Asiagomphus Asahina, 1985
- Austroepigomphus Fraser, 1953
- Austrogomphus Selys, 1854
- Borneogomphus Karube & Sasamoto, 2014
- Brasiliogomphus Belle, 1995
- Burmagomphus Williamson, 1907
- Cacoides Cowley, 1934
- Ceratogomphus Selys, 1854
- Cornigomphus Martin, 1907
- Crenigomphus Selys, 1892
- Cyanogomphus Selys, 1873
- Cyclogomphus Selys, 1854
- Davidioides Fraser, 1924
- Davidius Selys, 1878
- Desmogomphus Williamson, 1920
- Diaphlebia Selys, 1854
- Diastatomma Charpentier in Burmeister, 1839
- Dromogomphus Selys, 1854
- Dubitogomphus Fraser, 1940
- Ebegomphus Needham, 1944
- Eogomphus Needham, 1941
- Epigomphus Hagen in Selys, 1854
- Erpetogomphus Selys, 1858
- Euthygomphus Kosterin, 2016
- Fukienogomphus Chao, 1954
- Gastrogomphus Needham, 1941
- Gomphidia Selys, 1854
- Gomphidictinus Fraser, 1942
- Gomphoides Selys, 1854
- Gomphurus Needham, 1901
- Gomphus Leach, 1815
- Hagenius Selys, 1854
- Heliogomphus Laidlaw, 1922
- Hemigomphus Selys, 1854
- Hylogomphus Needham, Westfall & May, 2000
- Ictinogomphus Cowley, 1934
- Idiogomphoides Belle, 1984
- Isomma Selys, 1892
- Labrogomphus Needham, 1931
- Lamelligomphus Fraser, 1922
- Lanthus Needham, 1897
- Leptogomphus Selys, 1878
- Lestinogomphus Martin, 1911
- Libyogomphus Fraser, 1926
- Lindenia de Haan, 1826
- Macrogomphus Selys, 1858
- Mastigogomphus Cammaerts, 2004
- Mattigomphus Karube & Kosterin, 2018
- Megalogomphus Campion, 1923
- Melanocacus Belle, 1986
- Melligomphus Chao, 1990
- Merogomphus Martin, 1904
- Microgomphus Selys, 1858
- Neogomphus Selys, 1858
- Nepogomphoides Fraser, 1952
- Nepogomphus Fraser, 1934
- Neurogomphus Karsch, 1890
- Nihonogomphus Oguma, 1926
- Notogomphus Selys, 1858
- Nychogomphus Carle, 1986
- Octogomphus Selys, 1873
- Odontogomphus Watson, 1991
- Onychogomphus Selys, 1854
- Ophiogomphus Selys, 1854
- Orientogomphus Chao & Xu, 1987
- Paragomphus Cowley, 1934
- Perigomphus Belle, 1972
- Perissogomphus Laidlaw, 1922
- Peruviogomphus Klots, 1944
- Phaenandrogomphus Lieftinck, 1964
- Phanogomphus Carle, 1986
- Phyllocycla Calvert, 1948
- Phyllogomphoides Belle, 1970
- Phyllogomphus Selys, 1854
- Platygomphus Selys, 1854
- Praeviogomphus Belle, 1995
- Progomphus Selys, 1854
- Scalmogomphus Chao, 1990
- Shaogomphus Chao, 1984
- Sieboldius Selys, 1854
- Sinictinogomphus Fraser, 1939
- Sinogomphus May, 1935
- Stenogomphurus Carle, 1986
- Stylogomphus Fraser, 1922
- Stylurus Needham, 1897
- Tibiagomphus Belle, 1992
- Tragogomphus Sjöstedt, 1899
- Trigomphus Bartenev, 1912
- Zephyrogomphus Watson, 1991
- Zonophora Selys, 1854

== Phylogeny ==
Molecular phylogenetic studies consistently recover Gomphidae and Petaluridae as sister families comprising the superfamily Gomphoidea.

- Gomphoidea
  - Petaluridae
  - Gomphidae

== Fossil record ==
The oldest confirmed fossils assigned to Gomphidae are from the Late Cretaceous (Cenomanian). The family has an extensive fossil record extending from the Cretaceous to the Quaternary, with fossils recorded from Europe, Asia, North and South America, Australia and Africa.

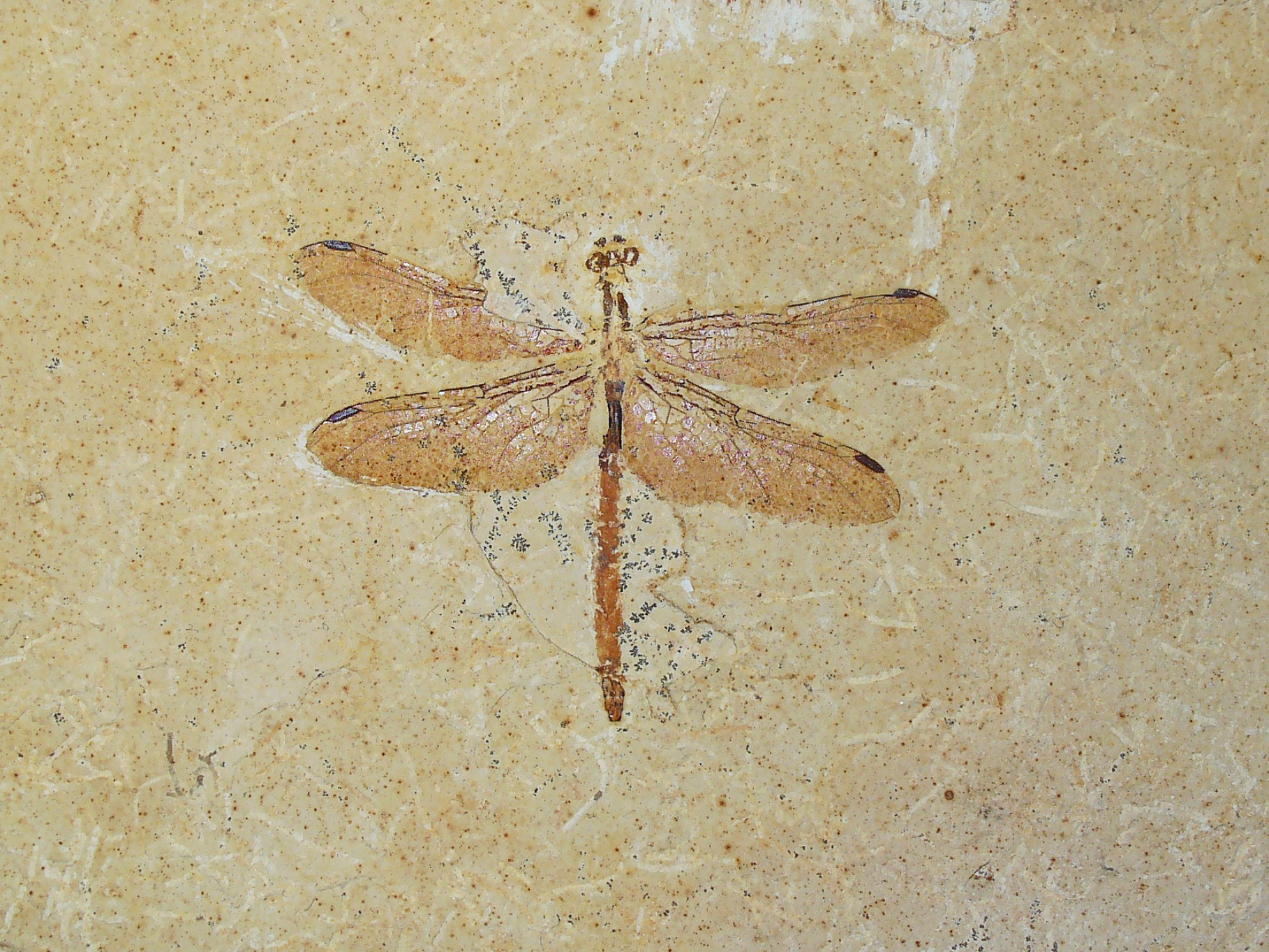
Fossil specimen of Cordulagomphus

=== Fossil genera ===
Several extinct genera have been assigned to Gomphidae, including:

- †Auroradraco Archibald & Cannings, 2019 Kamloops Group, Canada, Ypresian
- †Burmalindenia Schädel & Bechly, 2016 Burmese amber, Cenomanian
- †Cratohagenius Bechly, 2010 Crato Formation, Brazil, Aptian
- †Cratolindenia Bechly, 2000 Crato Formation, Brazil, Aptian
- †Gunterbechlya Huang et al., 2019 Burmese amber, Cenomanian
- ?†Nannogomphus Handlirsch, 1906 (potentially related to early dragonfly lineages)

== Etymology ==
The family name Gomphidae is derived from the type genus Gomphus, with the standard zoological suffix -idae used for families.

The genus name Gomphus is derived from the Greek γόμφος (gomphos, "bolt" or "nail"), referring to the shape of the abdomen, likened to a bolt used in shipbuilding.

== Gallery ==
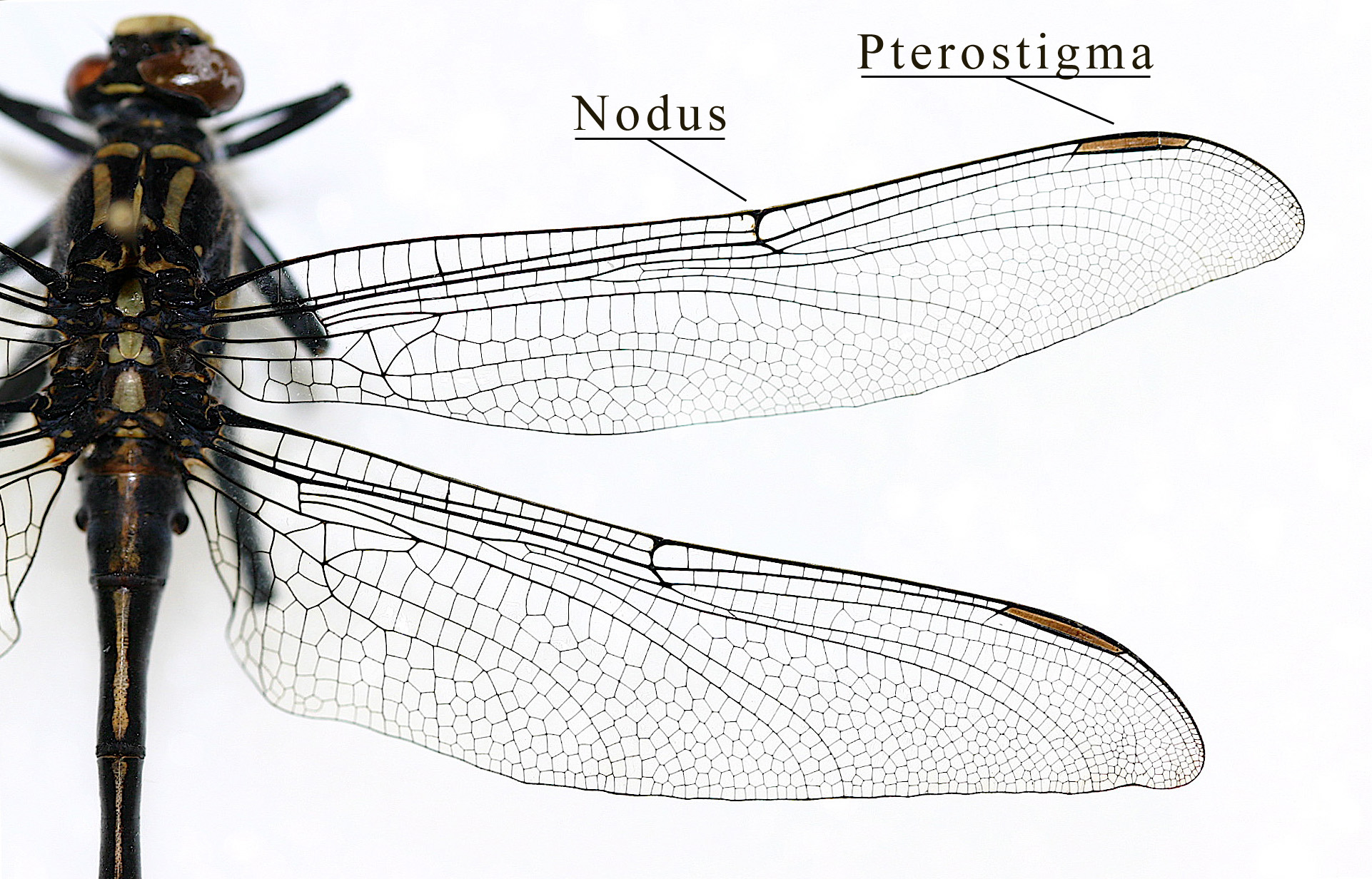
Gomphidae wing structure: note the similar-sized triangles of the front and hind wings and the widely separated eyes.

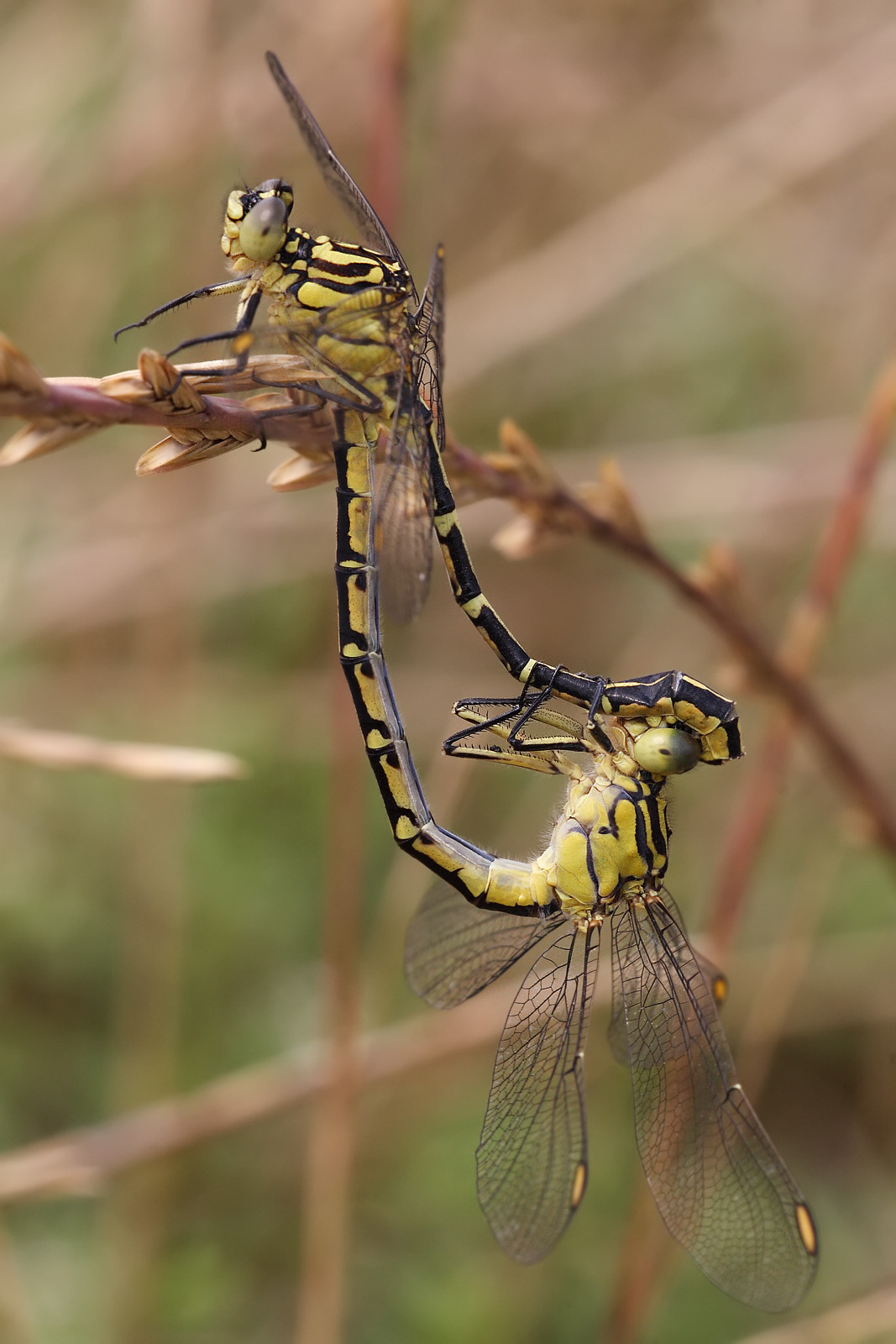
Pair of yellow-striped hunters mating

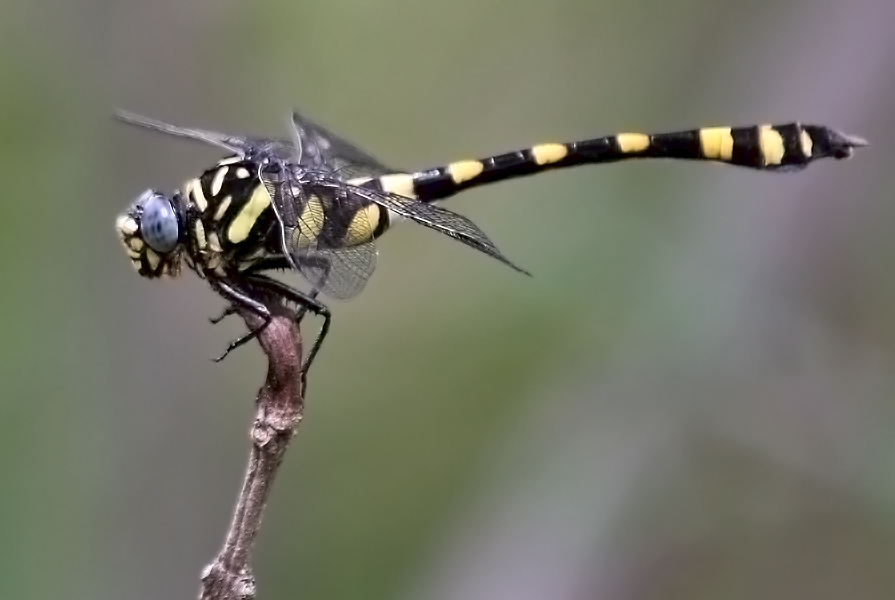
Common clubtail, Ictinogomphus rapax

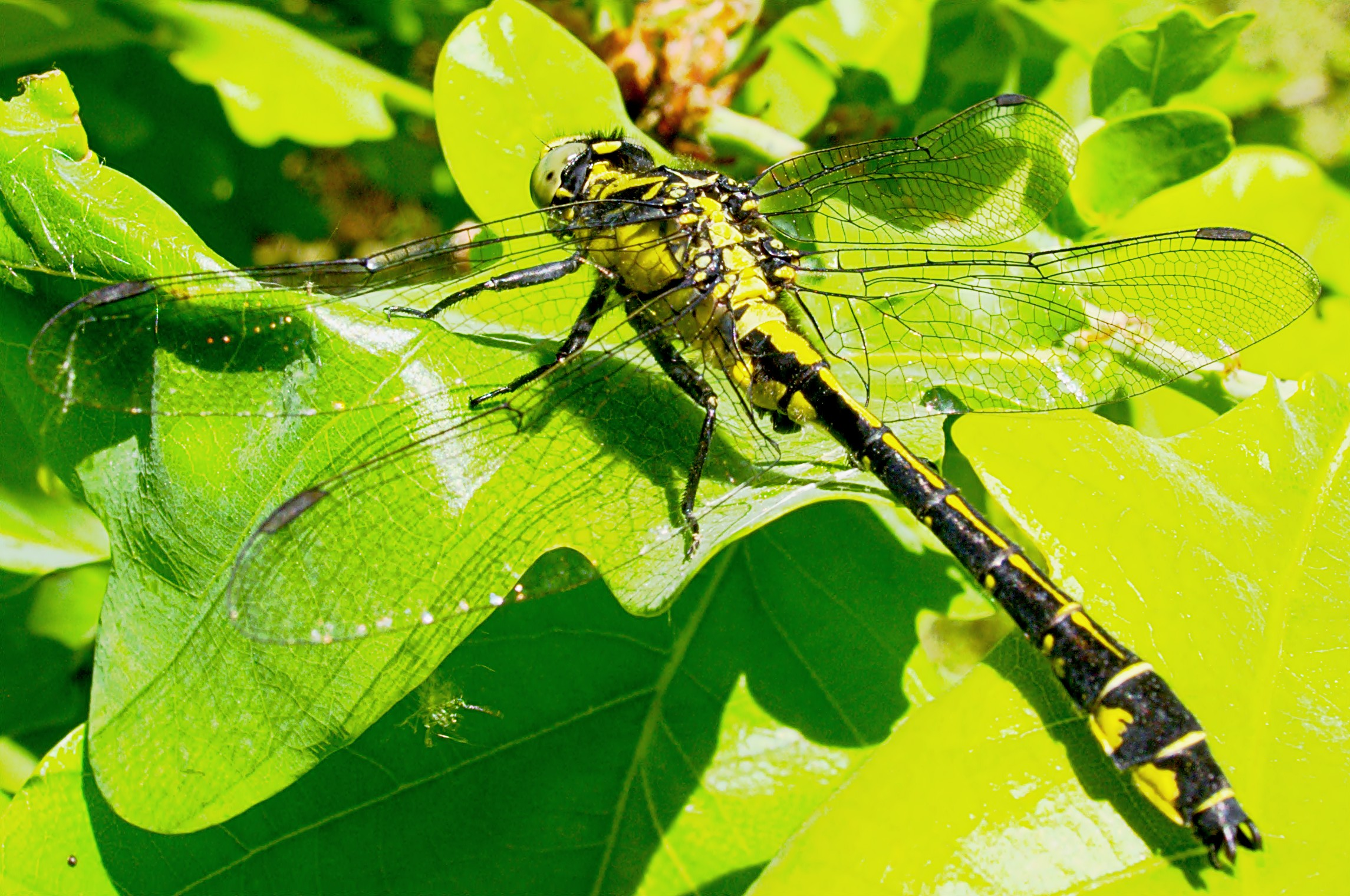
Gomphus vulgatissimus, showing the characteristic clubbed abdomen

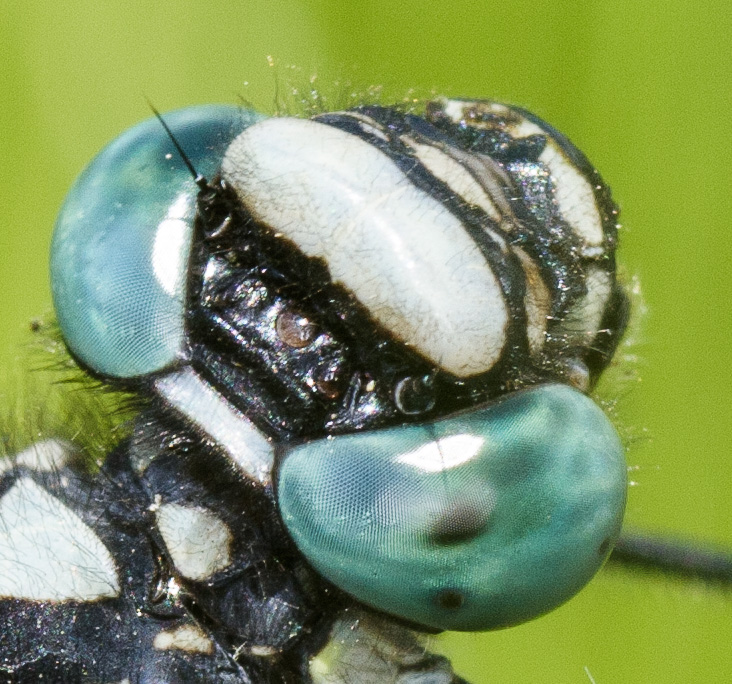
Head of Gomphus vulgatissimus showing widely separated eyes

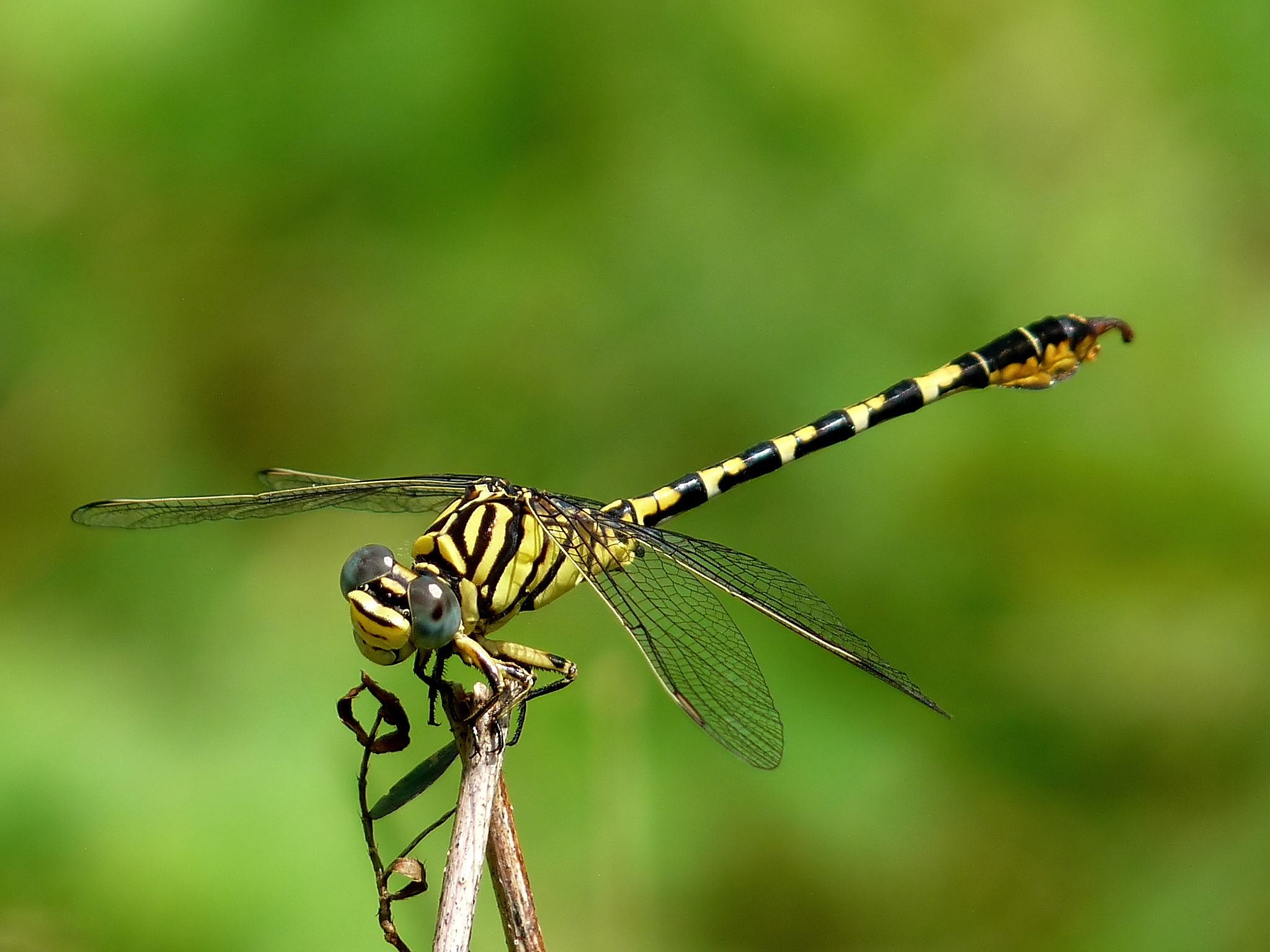
Paragomphus lineatus, male

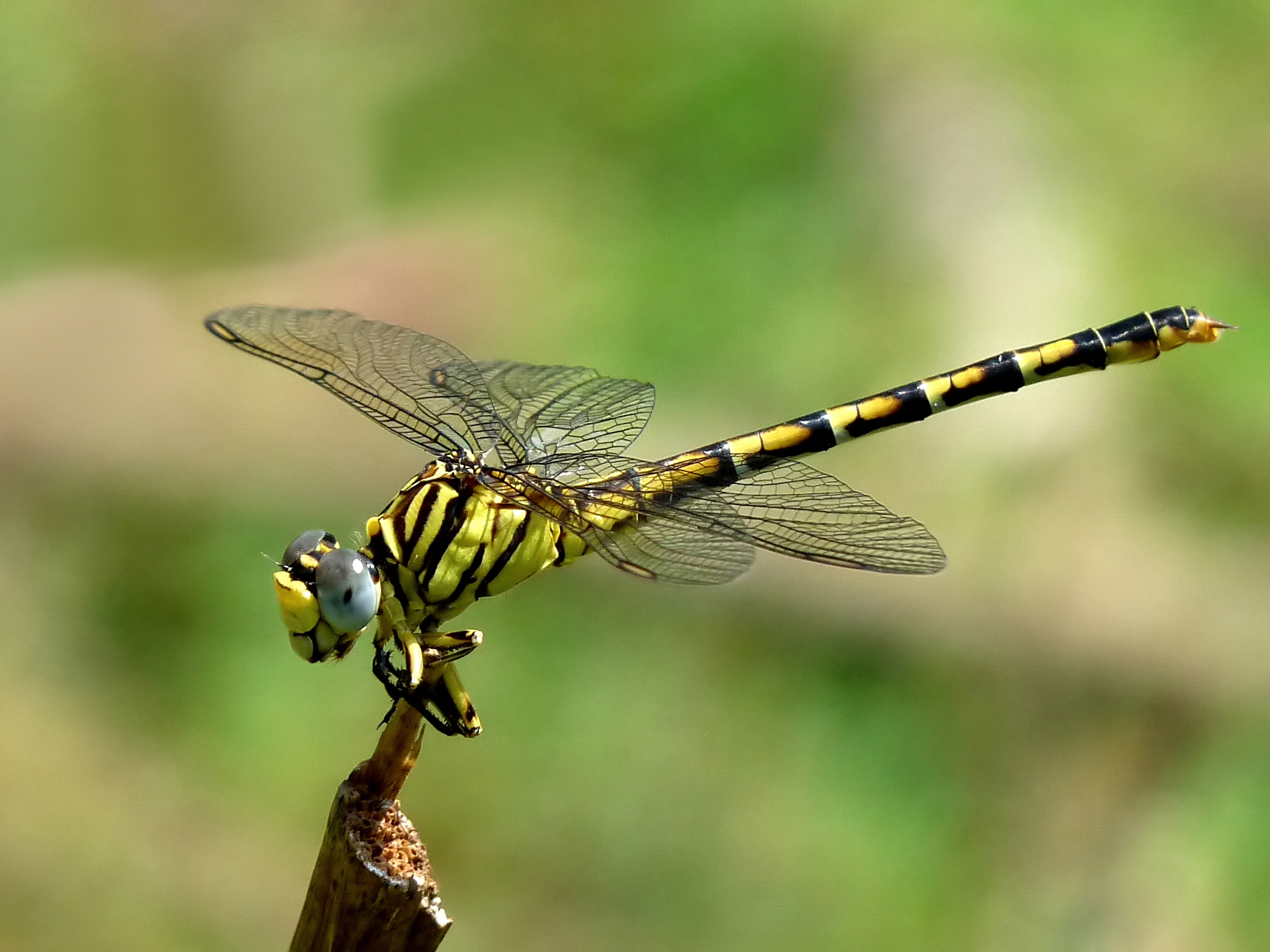
Paragomphus lineatus, female
