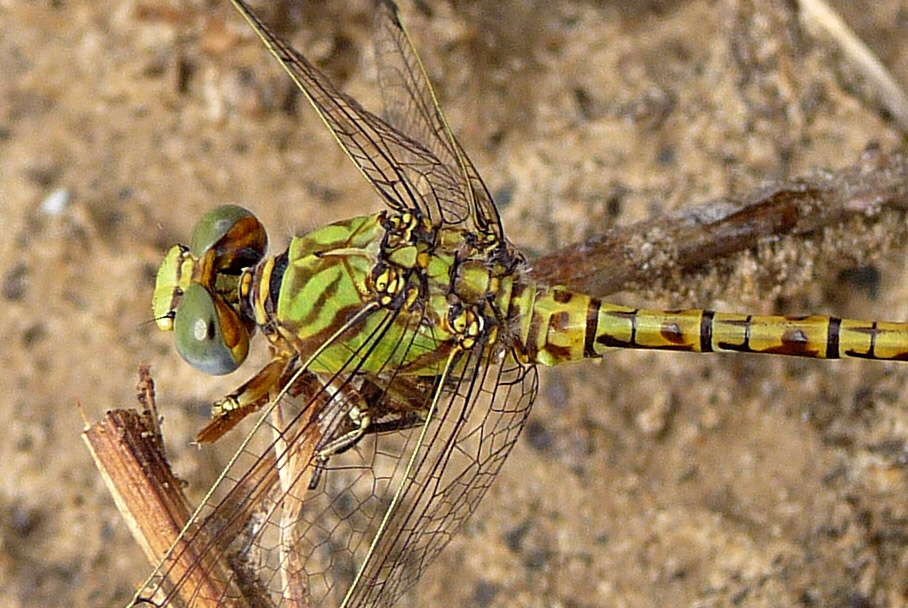

Conservation status
- Least Concern (IUCN 3.1)

Scientific classification
- Kingdom: Animalia
- Phylum: Arthropoda
- Class: Insecta
- Order: Odonata
- Infraorder: Anisoptera
- Family: Gomphidae
- Genus: Paragomphus
- Species: P. genei

Binomial name
- Paragomphus genei (Selys, 1841)

= Paragomphus genei =

Species of dragonfly

Paragomphus genei, the common hooktail, is a species of dragonfly in the family Gomphidae.

== Distribution and status ==
It is found in Algeria, Botswana, Cameroon, Central African Republic, the Democratic Republic of the Congo, Ivory Coast, Israel, Egypt, Ethiopia, Ghana, Guinea, Kenya, Liberia, Malawi, Morocco, Mozambique, Namibia, Nigeria, Oman, Sierra Leone, Somalia, South Africa, Sudan, Tanzania, Togo, Uganda, United Arab Emirates, Zambia, Zimbabwe, and possibly Burundi. Also lives in the south of Iberian Peninsula in Europe.

== Habitat ==
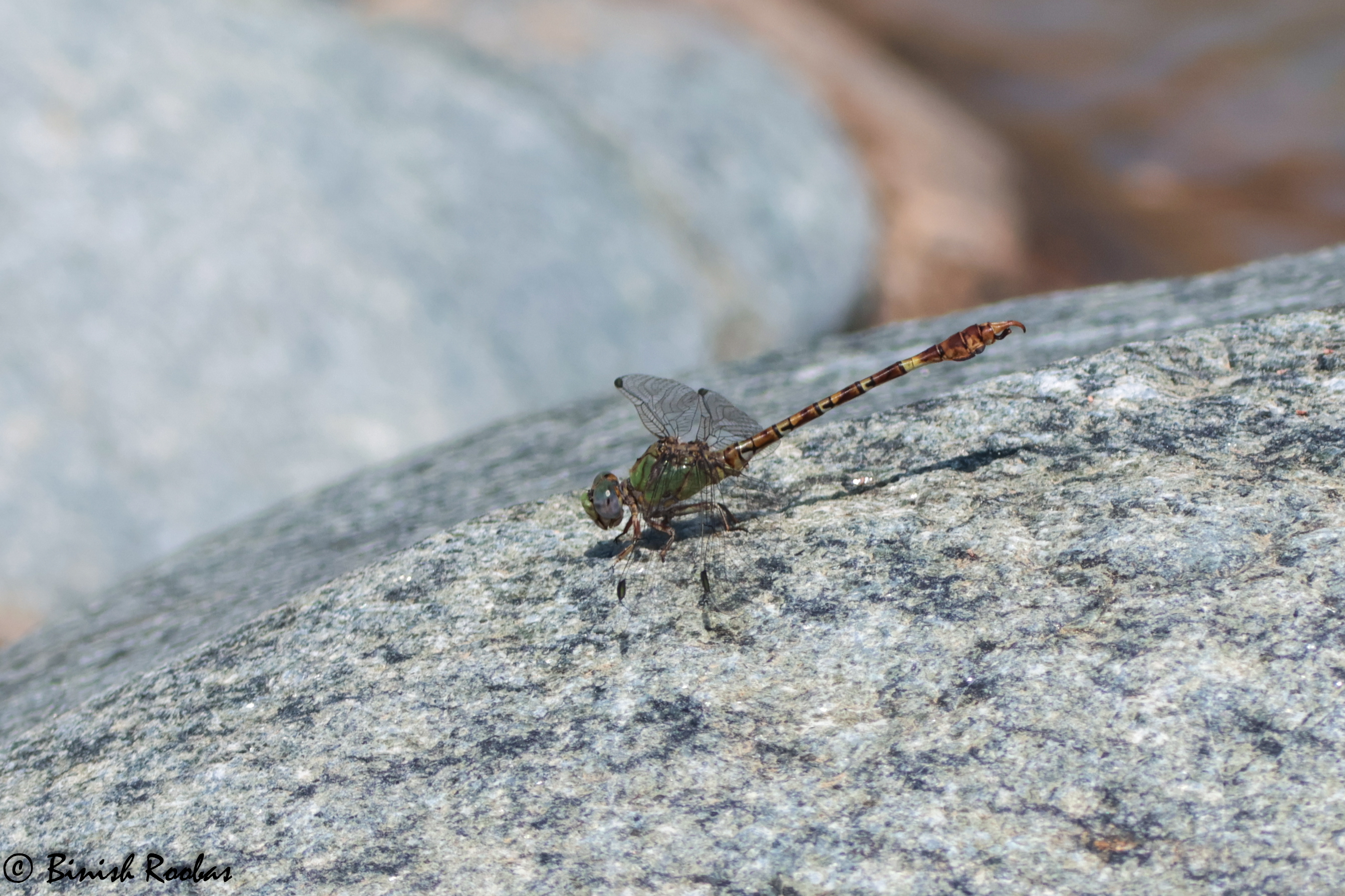
Paragomphus genei from Oman

Its natural habitats are subtropical or tropical moist lowland forests, dry savanna, moist savanna, subtropical or tropical dry shrubland, subtropical or tropical moist shrubland, rivers and intermittent rivers in the mediterranean area, freshwater lakes, and freshwater marshes.

== Identification ==
The common hooktail is a striking, small clubtail, reaching 50mm in length and up to 62mm wingspan. It has green face with greenish-brown eyes, a bright green thorax with dull brown stripes, a thin abdomen striped with brown, yellow and black markings, and its long yellow claspers are hooked.

It most similar to the rock hooktail (Paragomphus cognatus) and the corkscrew hooktail (Paragomphus elpidius). It's distinguished from the former by its vibrant green thorax and entirely yellow, non-splayed claspers, and from the latter by being its smaller, less intensely green body, the less pronounced abdominal foliations and the less sharply hooked upper claspers.
