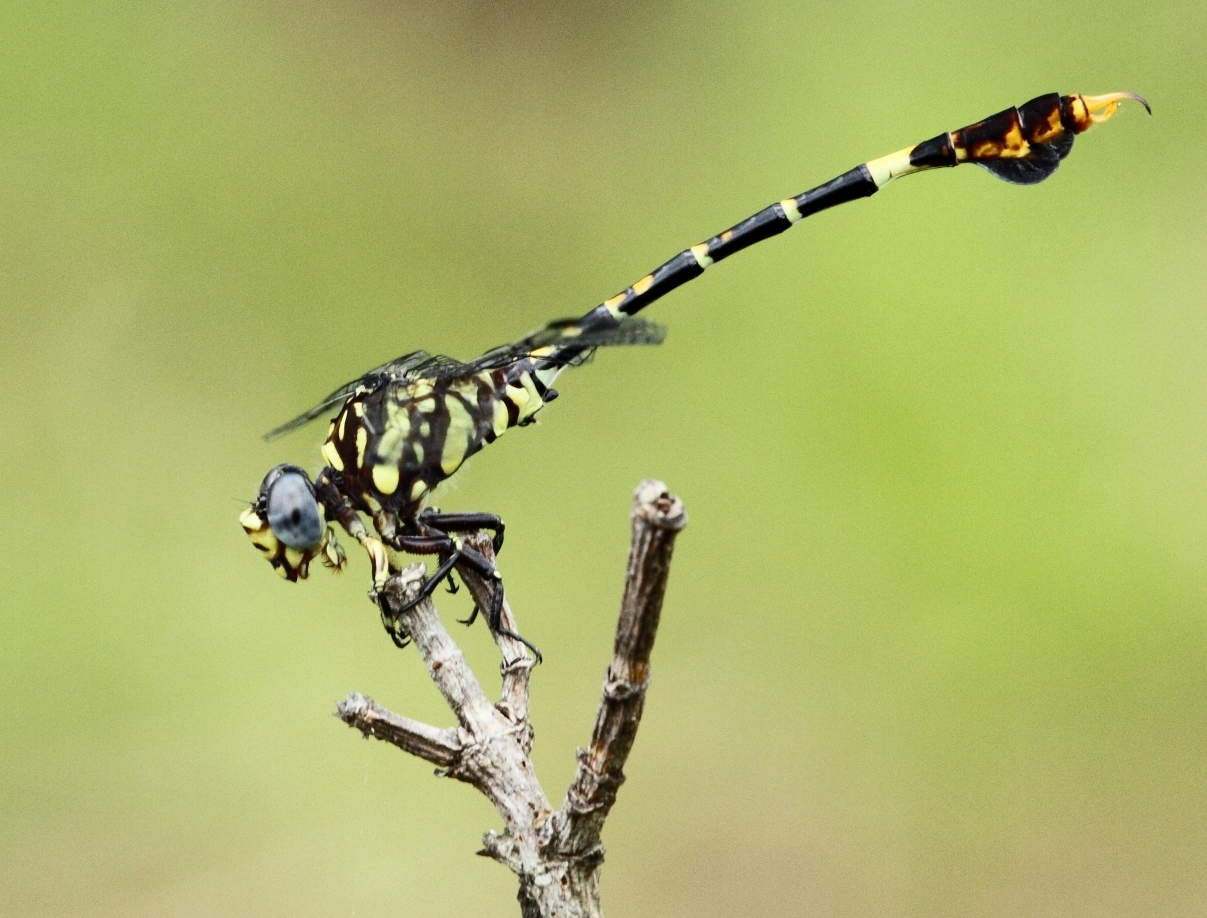
- Male

Conservation status
- Least Concern (IUCN 3.1)

Scientific classification
- Kingdom: Animalia
- Phylum: Arthropoda
- Class: Insecta
- Order: Odonata
- Infraorder: Anisoptera
- Family: Gomphidae
- Genus: Paragomphus
- Species: P. sabicus

Binomial name
- Paragomphus sabicus Pinhey, 1950

= Paragomphus sabicus =

Species of dragonfly

Paragomphus sabicus, the Sabi hooktail, is a species of dragonfly in the family Gomphidae. It is found in Botswana, Kenya, Malawi, Mozambique, Namibia, South Africa, Tanzania, Zambia, and Zimbabwe. Its natural habitats are subtropical or tropical moist lowland forests, subtropical or tropical dry shrubland, subtropical or tropical moist shrubland, and rivers. The name comes from the Sabi Valley in modern Zimbabwe where the holotype specimens were collected in the late 1940s.

Paragomphus sabicus is similar in appearance to the rock hooktail (Paragomphus cognatus), but with a bright yellow face, and rust-colored markings on abdominal segments 8-9, orange markings on 10, and black folliations on females that are larger and marked with rust-colored lines on males.
