= Foliation (disambiguation) =

Foliate or foliation may refer to:

- Foliation, a geometric device used to study manifolds
- Foliation (geology), a property of certain rocks
- A pagination system in book production
- Vernation, the growth and arrangement of leaves
- Foliate, a botanical term meaning leafy, having leaves or having a number of leaflets
- Foil (architecture), an ornamentation consisting of a carved leaf shape, as in trefoils
- In dragonfly morphology, leaf-like extensions on segment 8 or segment 9 of the abdomen
- Foliate (software), the program for reading e-books
