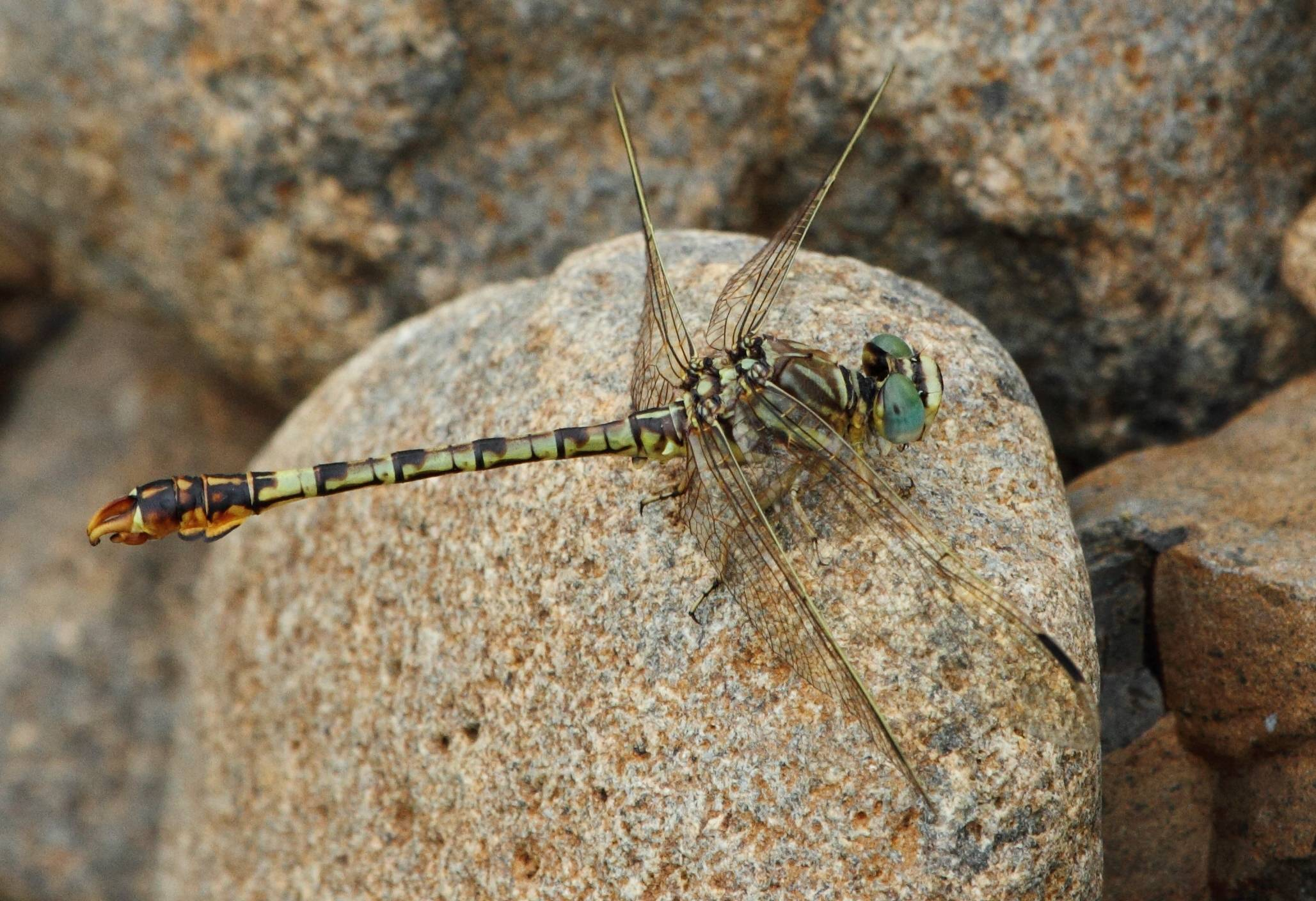
- Male

Conservation status
- Least Concern (IUCN 3.1)

Scientific classification
- Kingdom: Animalia
- Phylum: Arthropoda
- Class: Insecta
- Order: Odonata
- Infraorder: Anisoptera
- Family: Gomphidae
- Genus: Crenigomphus
- Species: C. hartmanni

Binomial name
- Crenigomphus hartmanni (Förster, 1898)

= Crenigomphus hartmanni =

Species of dragonfly

Crenigomphus hartmanni, the clubbed talontail, is a species of dragonfly in the family Gomphidae.

== Distribution ==
It is found in Angola, the Republic of the Congo, the Democratic Republic of the Congo, Kenya, Malawi, Mozambique, Namibia, South Africa, Tanzania, Uganda, Zambia, Zimbabwe, and possibly Burundi.

== Status ==
Least concern

== Habitat ==
Its natural habitats are subtropical or tropical moist lowland forests, dry savanna, moist savanna, subtropical or tropical dry shrubland, subtropical or tropical moist shrubland, rivers, intermittent rivers, freshwater lakes, intermittent freshwater lakes, freshwater marshes, and intermittent freshwater marshes.

== Identification ==
The shape of the claspers are diagnostic; the tip of the epiproct is talon shaped, and the end of the abdomen is club shaped. The eyes are turquoise above and light grey below. The thorax is mainly yellowish green with contrasting narrow indistinct brown stripes. Abdomen is yellow and brown with a brown patch at the joint of each segment. The superior (upper) appendages are yellow, thick and turned down. The superior appendages are only slightly longer than the lower appendages. s9 half as long as s10 . On each sides of s8 - s9 are small club shaped foliations. Segment 9 half as long as s10. Segment 8, 9 and especially s10 are swollen. These swellings and small foliations give it the shape of a club. Wings are smoky and with a yellow costa. The black pterostigmata are long and narrow.

== Gallery ==
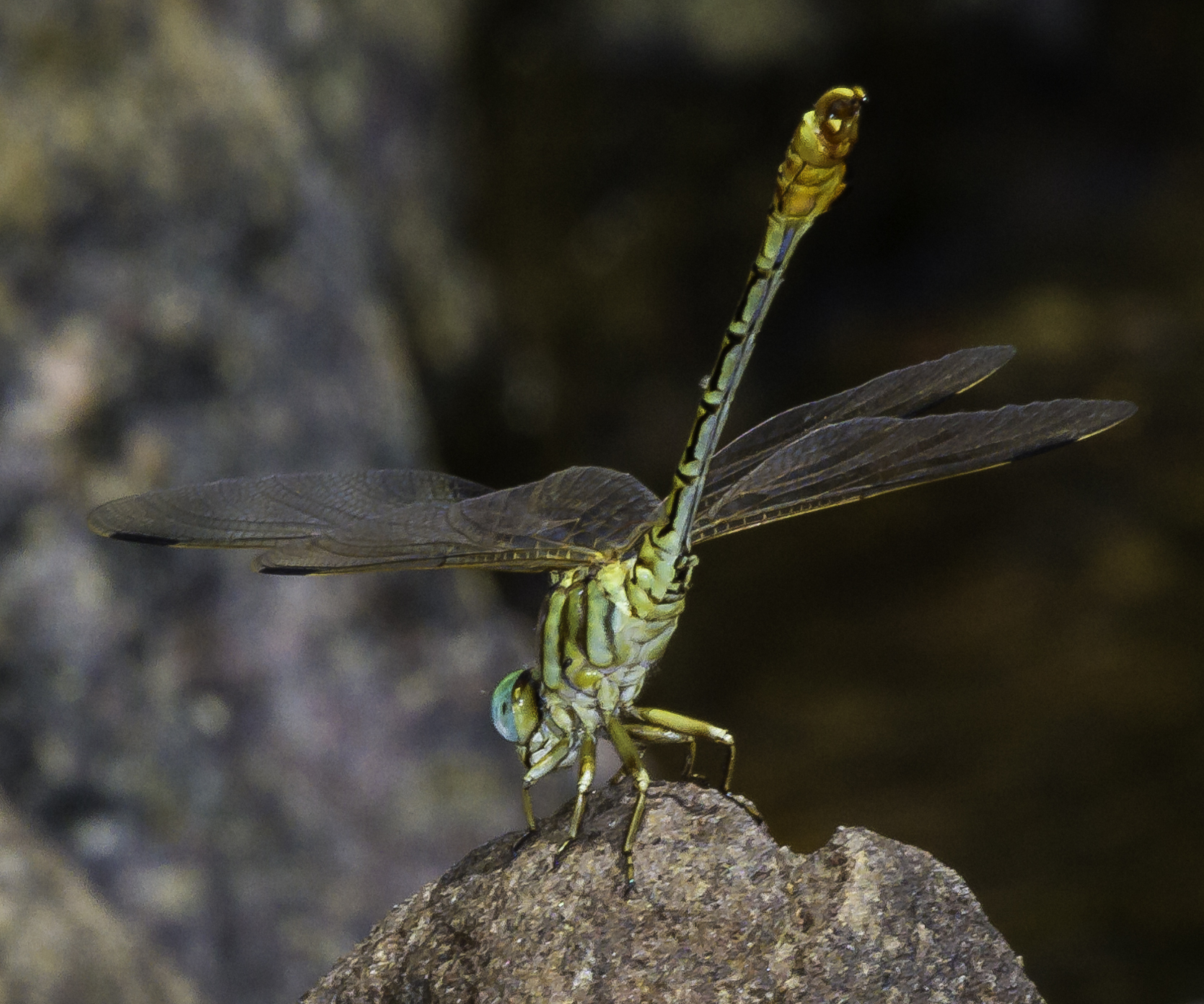
Male rear side view

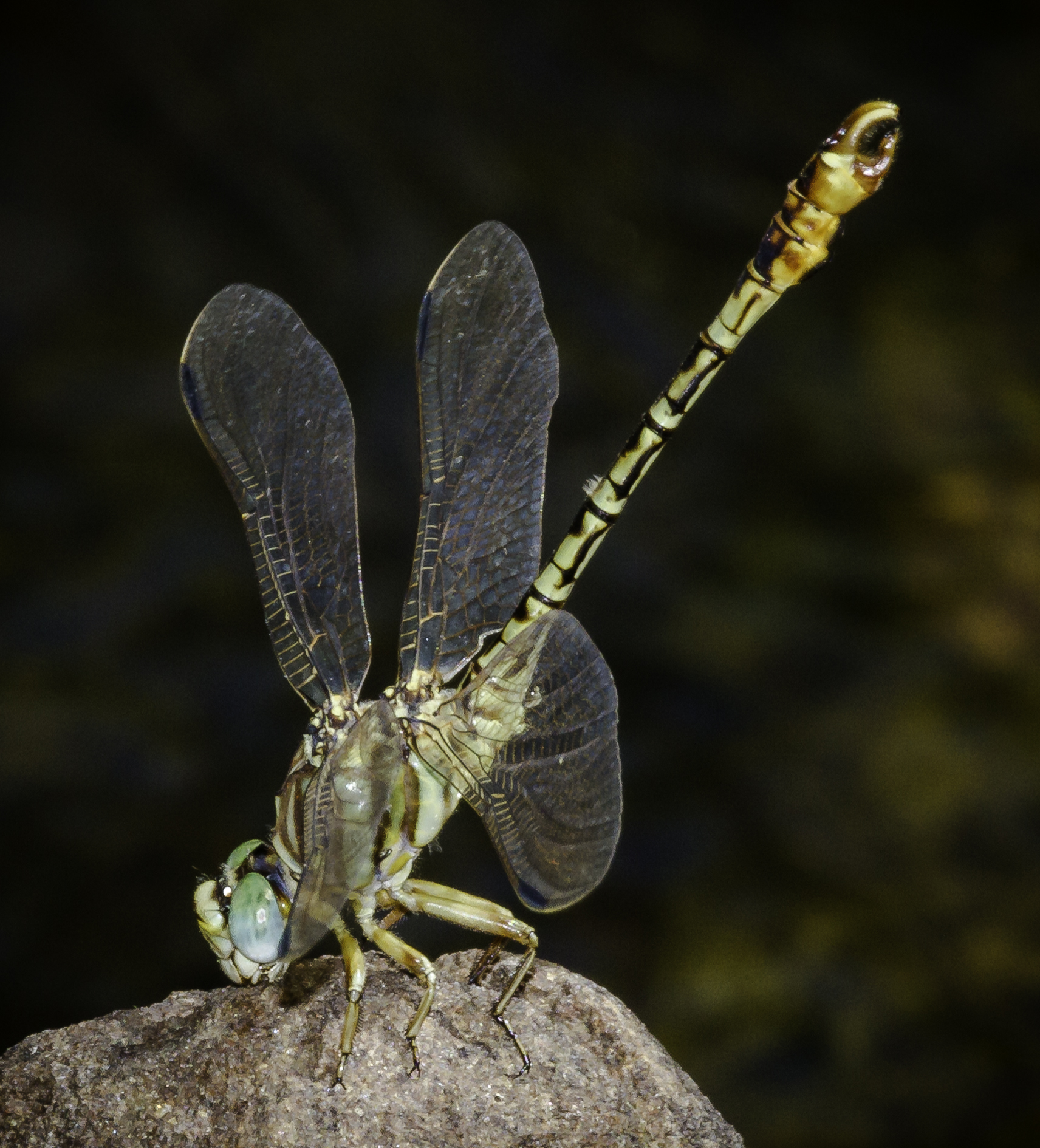
Male side view

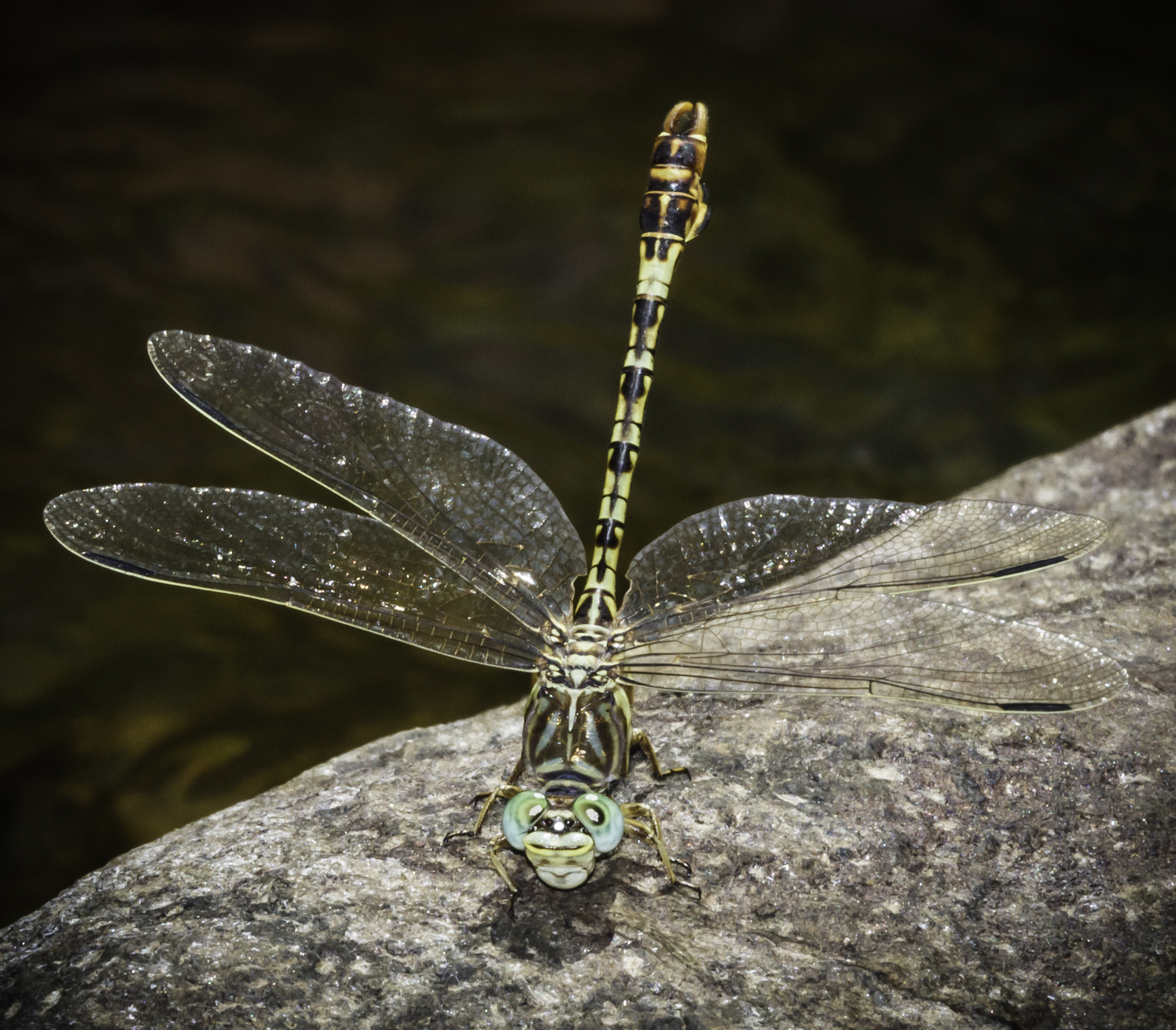
Male front view

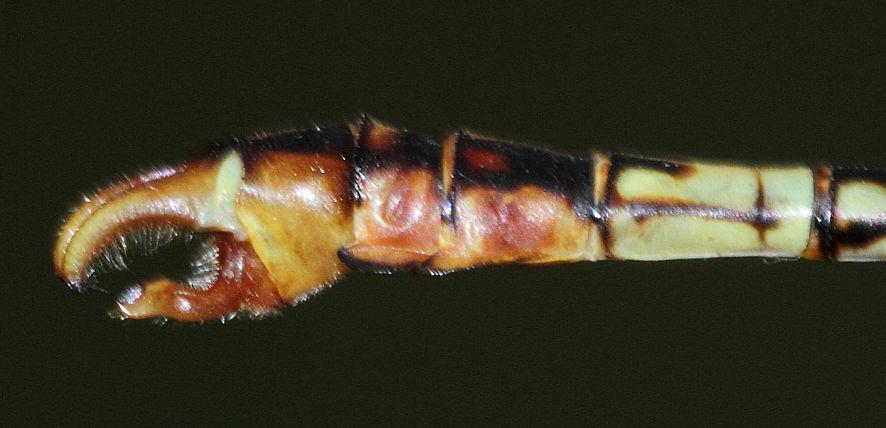
Detail of male abdomen

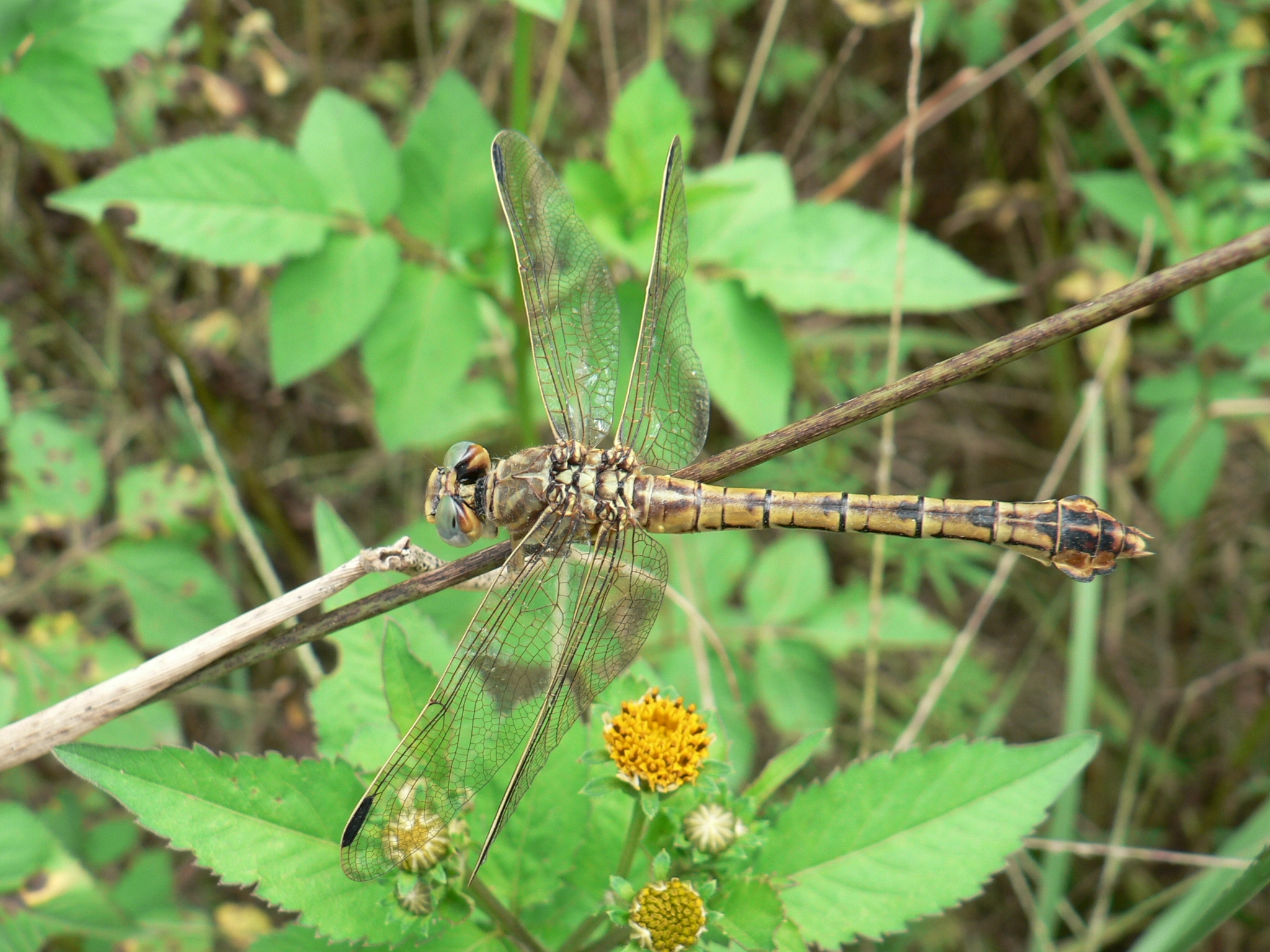
Clubbed talontail female
