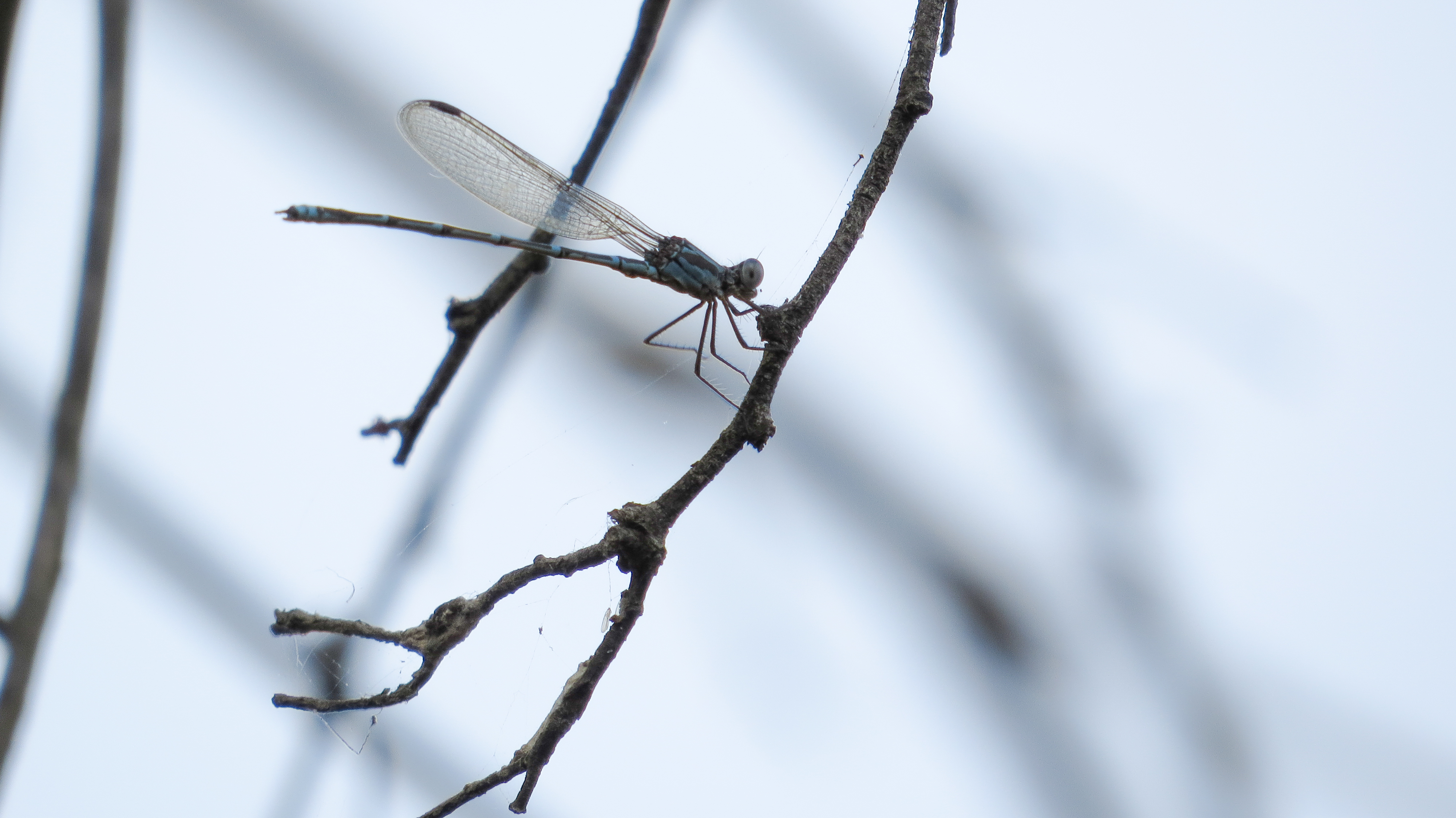

Conservation status
- Least Concern (IUCN 3.1)

Scientific classification
- Kingdom: Animalia
- Phylum: Arthropoda
- Clade: Pancrustacea
- Class: Insecta
- Order: Odonata
- Suborder: Zygoptera
- Family: Lestidae
- Genus: Austrolestes
- Species: A. aridus

Binomial name
- Austrolestes aridus (Tillyard, 1908)

Synonyms
- Lestes aridus Tillyard, 1908; Lestes humphriesi Lieftinck, 1952

= Austrolestes aridus =

Inland ringtail

Species of damselfly

Austrolestes aridus is an Australian species of damselfly in the family Lestidae, commonly known as an inland ringtail. It is widespread across inland Australia, where it inhabits streams, pools, lakes and both permanent and temporary ponds. In Victoria, sightings of Austrolestes aridus mostly occurred in North-West region.

Austrolestes aridus is a medium-sized to large damselfly, the male is light blue and black in colour, with a pale band near the tip of his tail. Its metapleural suture has a narrow black lining.

The larvae of Austrolestes aridus has been measured to be 30-32 mm in length.

Austrolestes aridus appears similar to Austrolestes analis which is found across southern Australia. Both can be separately identified from the metapleural suture and the humeral stripe of A. aridus.

== Etymology ==
R.J. Tillyard named and identified the species in 1908 at Tennant Creek. The genus name Austrolestes combines the prefix austro- (from Latin auster, meaning “south wind”, hence “southern”) with Lestes, a genus name derived from Greek λῃστής (lēstēs, “robber”).

The species name aridus is Latin for "dry", "arid", likely referring to its occurrence in Central Australia.

== Gallery ==
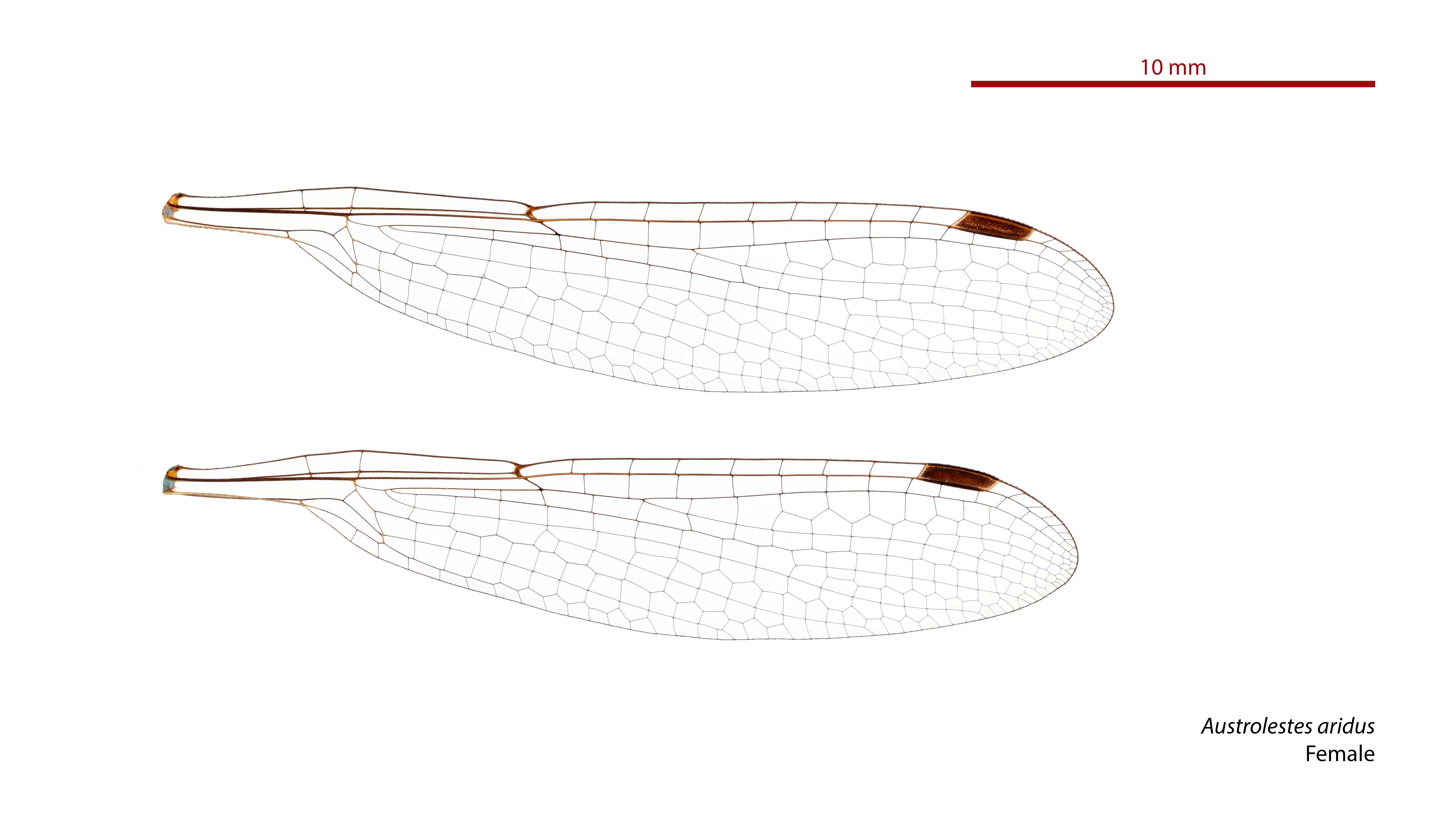
Female wings

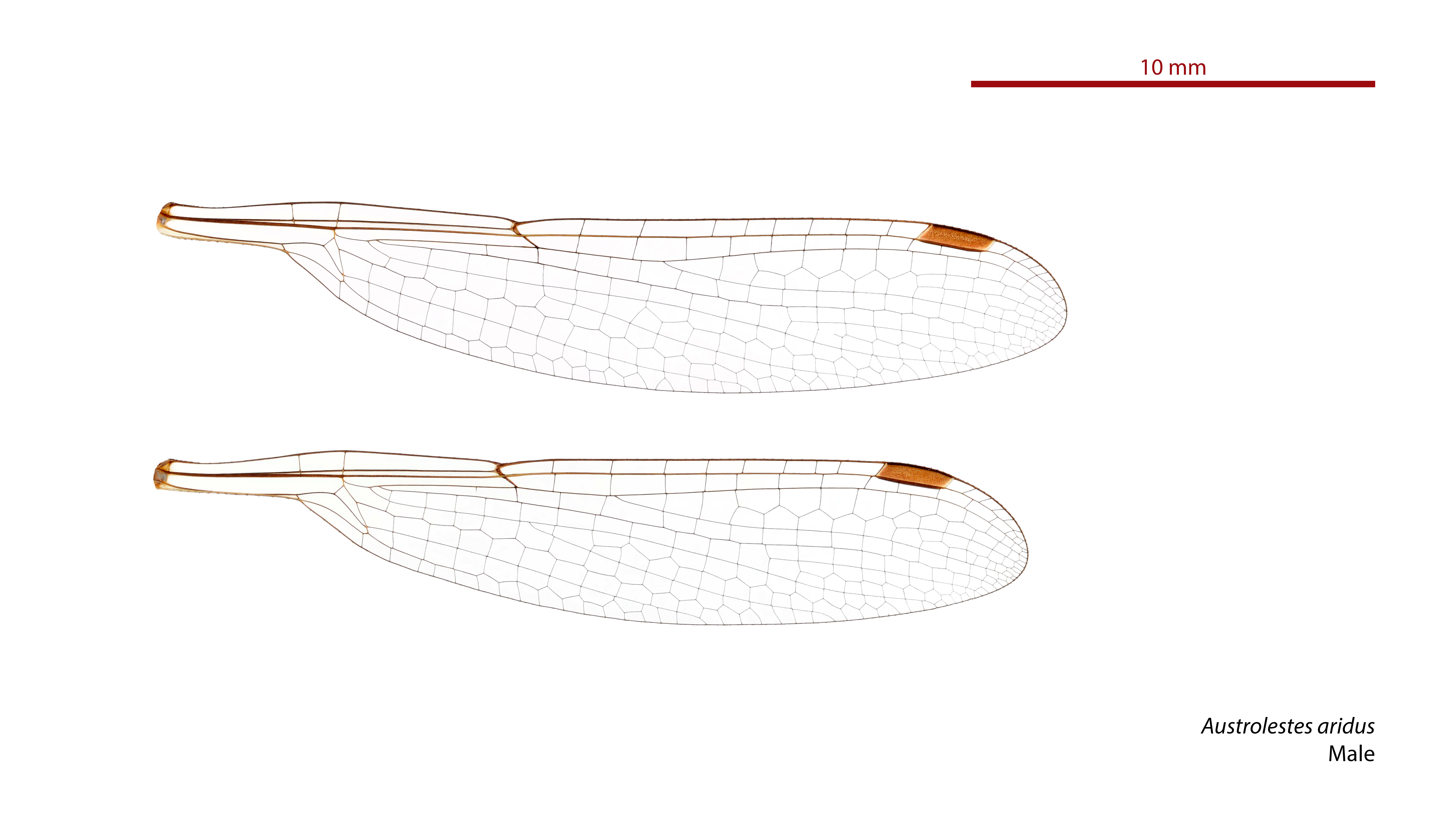
Male wings

== See also ==
- List of Odonata species of Australia
