= P. magnus =

P. magnus may refer to:

- Paragomphus magnus, a dragonfly species found in Kenya, Mozambique, Tanzania, and Zimbabwe
- Peptostreptococcus magnus, an anaerobic, Gram-positive, non-spore forming bacterium species
- Pontolis magnus, an extinct species of walrus.

== See also ==
- Magnus
