= Paragomphus henryi =

Conservation status
- Near Threatened (IUCN 3.1)

Scientific classification
- Kingdom: Animalia
- Phylum: Arthropoda
- Clade: Pancrustacea
- Class: Insecta
- Order: Odonata
- Infraorder: Anisoptera
- Family: Gomphidae
- Genus: Paragomphus
- Species: P. henryi

Binomial name
- Paragomphus henryi (Laidlaw, 1928)

Synonyms
- Mesogomphus henryi Campinon & Laidlaw, 1928

Species of dragonfly

Paragomphus henryi, the brook hooktail or Sri Lanka brook hooktail, is a species of dragonfly in the family Gomphidae. It is endemic to Sri Lanka.

== See also ==
- List of odonates of Sri Lanka
