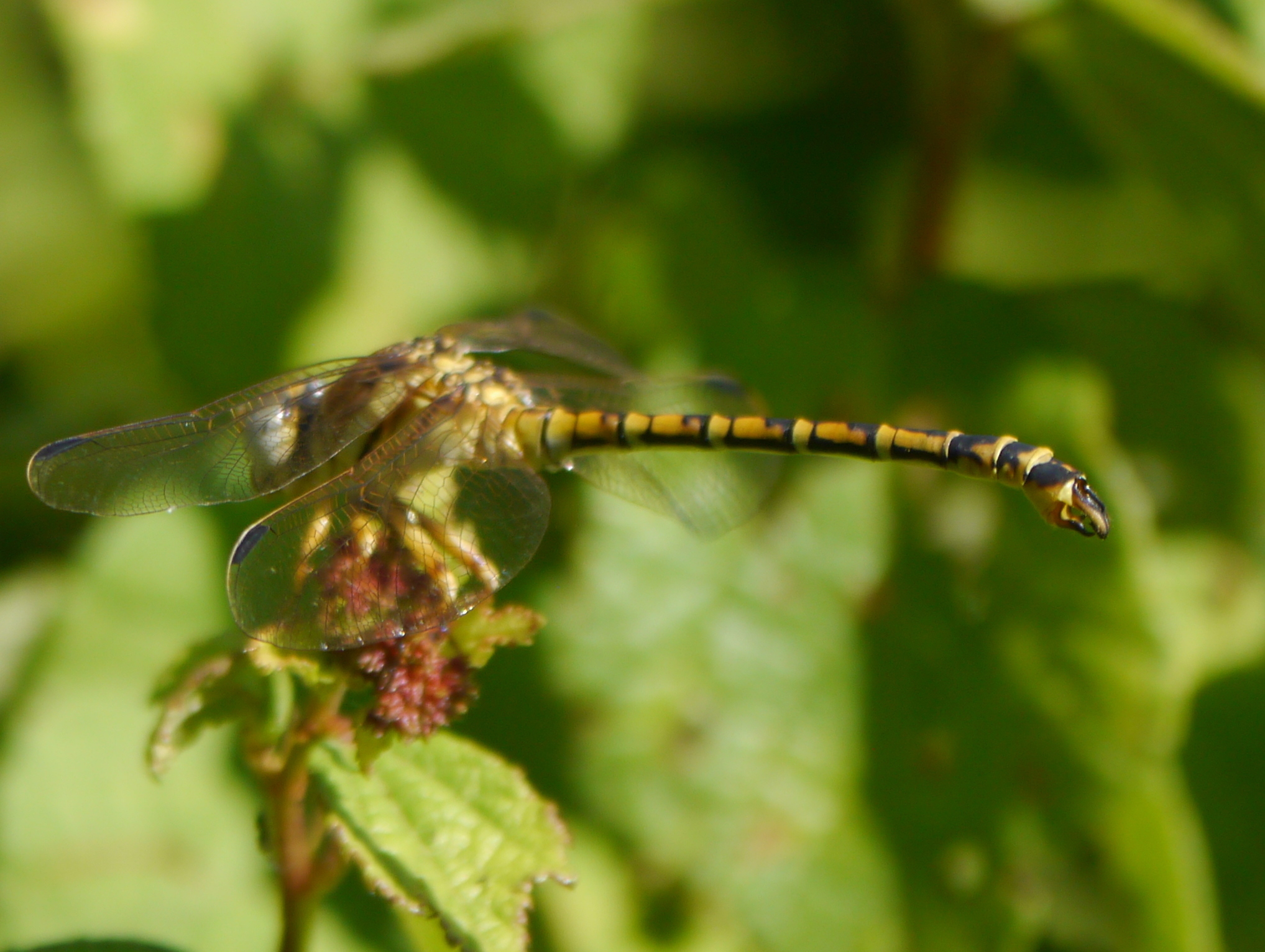

Conservation status
- Least Concern (IUCN 3.1)

Scientific classification
- Kingdom: Animalia
- Phylum: Arthropoda
- Class: Insecta
- Order: Odonata
- Infraorder: Anisoptera
- Family: Gomphidae
- Genus: Crenigomphus
- Species: C. renei

Binomial name
- Crenigomphus renei Fraser, 1936

= Crenigomphus renei =

Species of dragonfly

Crenigomphus renei is a species of dragonfly in the family Gomphidae. It is found in the Republic of the Congo, the Democratic Republic of the Congo, Ivory Coast, Ghana, Kenya, Nigeria, Tanzania, Uganda, and possibly Malawi. Its natural habitats are subtropical or tropical dry shrubland, subtropical or tropical moist shrubland, rivers, freshwater lakes, and freshwater marshes.
