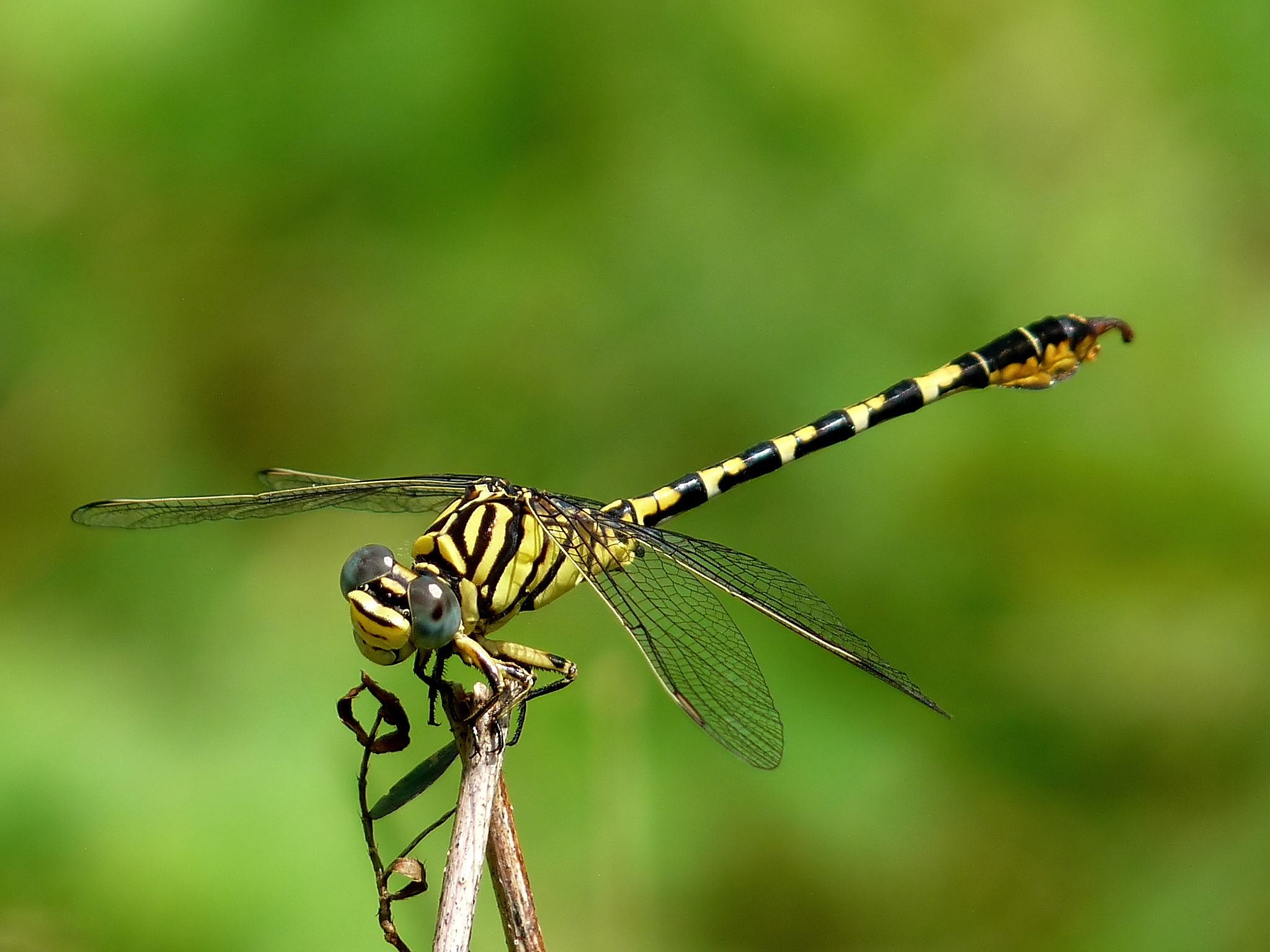
- Male

Conservation status
- Least Concern (IUCN 3.1)

Scientific classification
- Kingdom: Animalia
- Phylum: Arthropoda
- Class: Insecta
- Order: Odonata
- Infraorder: Anisoptera
- Family: Gomphidae
- Genus: Paragomphus
- Species: P. lineatus

Binomial name
- Paragomphus lineatus (Selys, 1850)

= Paragomphus lineatus =

Species of dragonfly

Paragomphus lineatus, the lined hooktail, is a species of dragonfly in the family Gomphidae. It is a widespread species; recorded from India to Turkey.

== Description and habitat ==
It is a black and yellow dragonfly with bluish grey eyes. Its thorax is yellow, marked with blackish-brown stripes. There is a black dorsal line bordering the mesothoraoic collar on either side of the mid-dorsal carina and an oblique antehumeral line to join this line in its upper part, thus enclosing a thin stripe of the yellow colour. There is a line on the humeral suture and two lateral lines close together on the postero-lateral suture. Abdomen is black marked with yellow basal rings. Segment 1 has the sides broadly yellow and a large dorsal apical spot. Segment 2 has a sub-dorsal black line on each side enclosing a dorsal yellow spot. Segments 3 to 7 have broad black apical rings. There is a lateral black line runs from the apical ring on each side and extends to the yellow base. Segments 8 and 9 have wide dilatations at their sides. They are black on the dorsum except for a fine basal rings. Segment 10 is yellow, with black on the basal half of the dorsum. Anal appendages are yellow and hood-shaped. Female is similar to the male; but lacks the dilatations on the last abdominal segments.

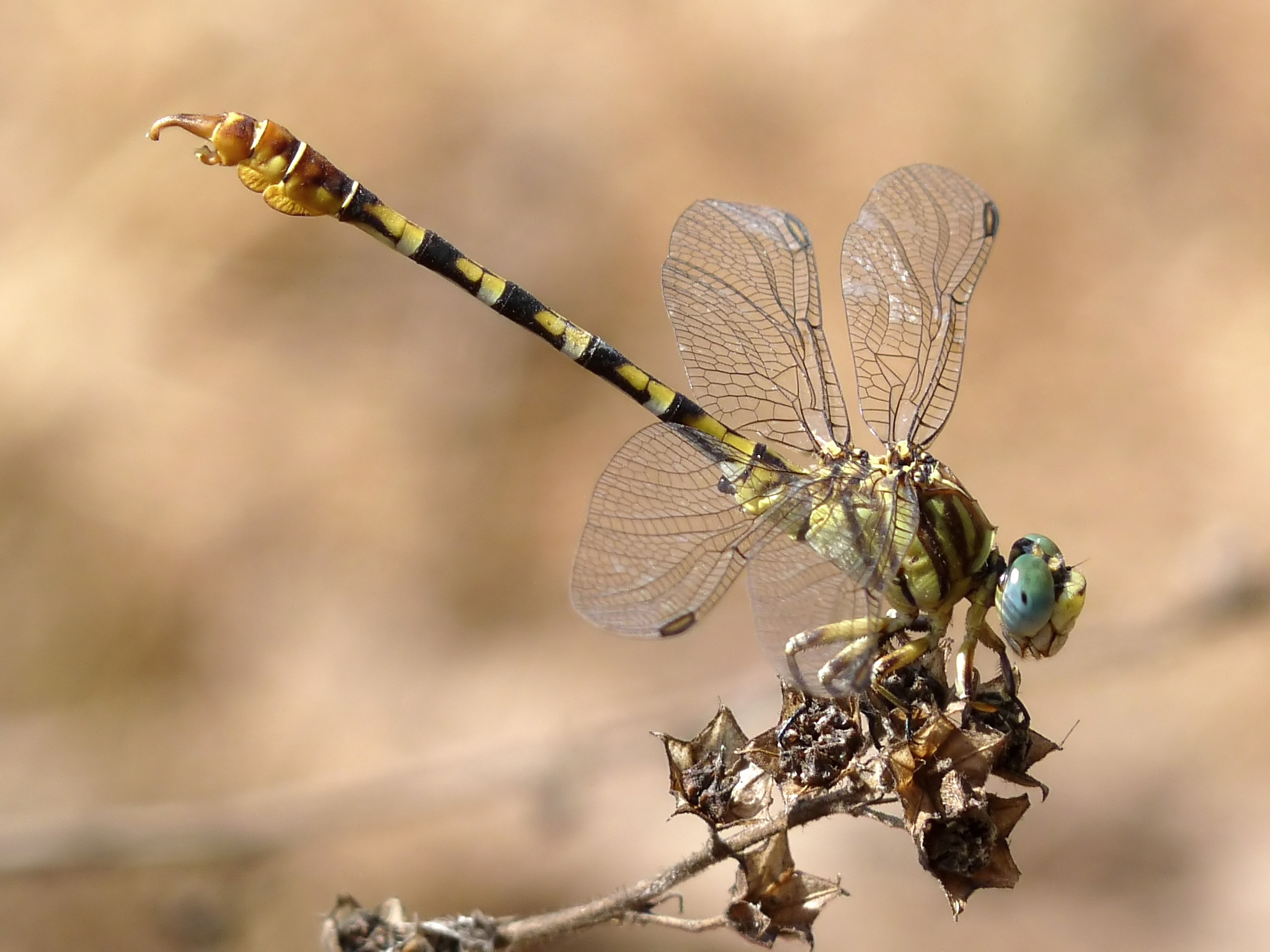
Male

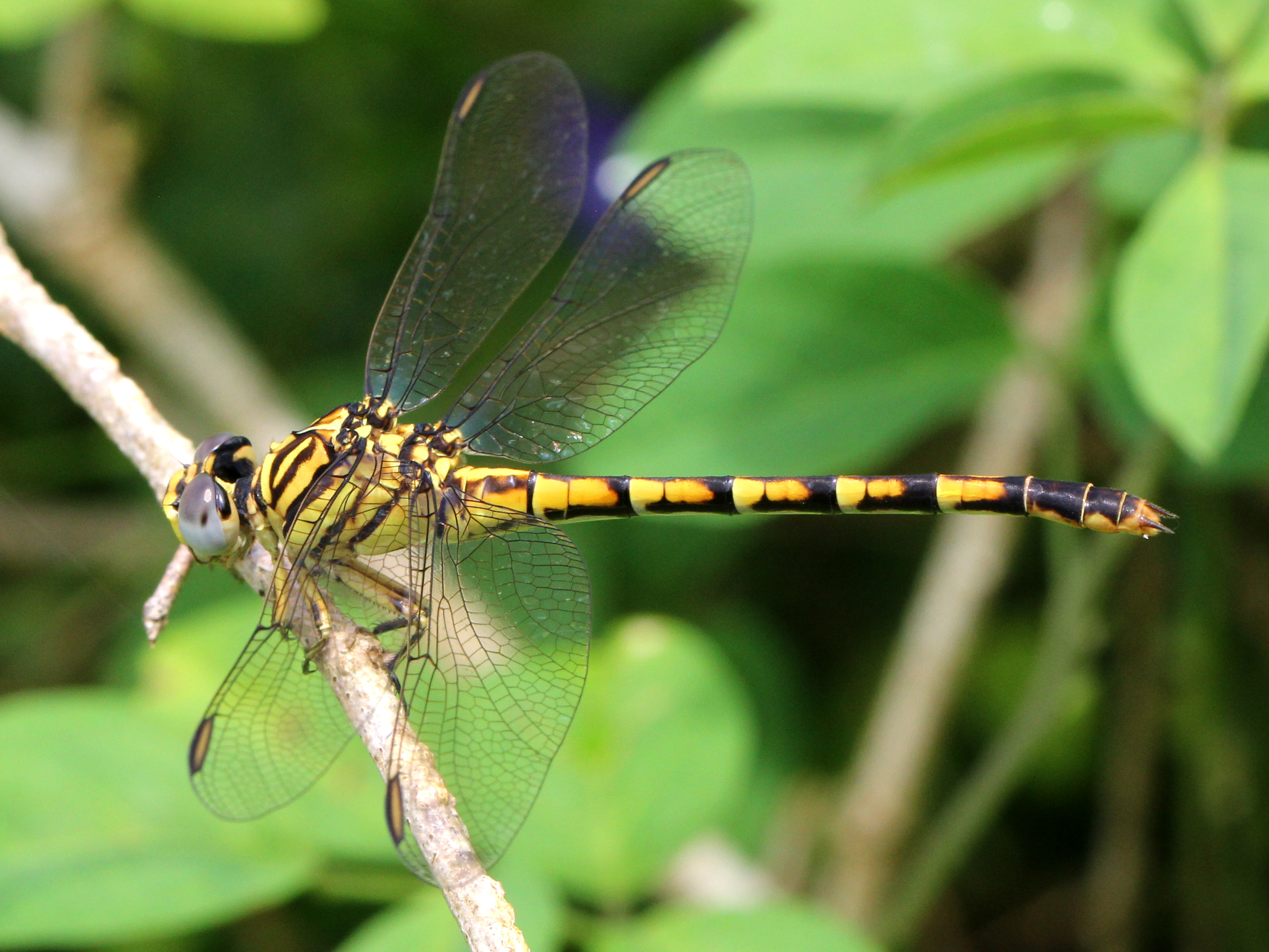
Female

It is commonly found near streams, rivers, ponds and lakes where it breeds.

== See also ==
- List of odonates of India
- List of odonata of Kerala
