= Paragomphus pumilio =

Conservation status
- Least Concern (IUCN 3.1)

Scientific classification
- Kingdom: Animalia
- Phylum: Arthropoda
- Class: Insecta
- Order: Odonata
- Infraorder: Anisoptera
- Family: Gomphidae
- Genus: Paragomphus
- Species: P. pumilio

Binomial name
- Paragomphus pumilio (Rambur, 1842)

Species of dragonfly

Paragomphus pumilio is a species of dragonfly in the family Gomphidae. It is found in Egypt, Ethiopia, Kenya, and Sudan. Its natural habitats are dry savanna, rivers, freshwater lakes, and hot deserts.
