= Crenigomphus denticulatus =

Conservation status
- Vulnerable (IUCN 3.1)

Scientific classification
- Kingdom: Animalia
- Phylum: Arthropoda
- Class: Insecta
- Order: Odonata
- Infraorder: Anisoptera
- Family: Gomphidae
- Genus: Crenigomphus
- Species: C. denticulatus

Binomial name
- Crenigomphus denticulatus Selys, 1892

Species of dragonfly

Crenigomphus denticulatus is a species of dragonfly in the family Gomphidae. It is endemic to Ethiopia. It is threatened by habitat loss.
