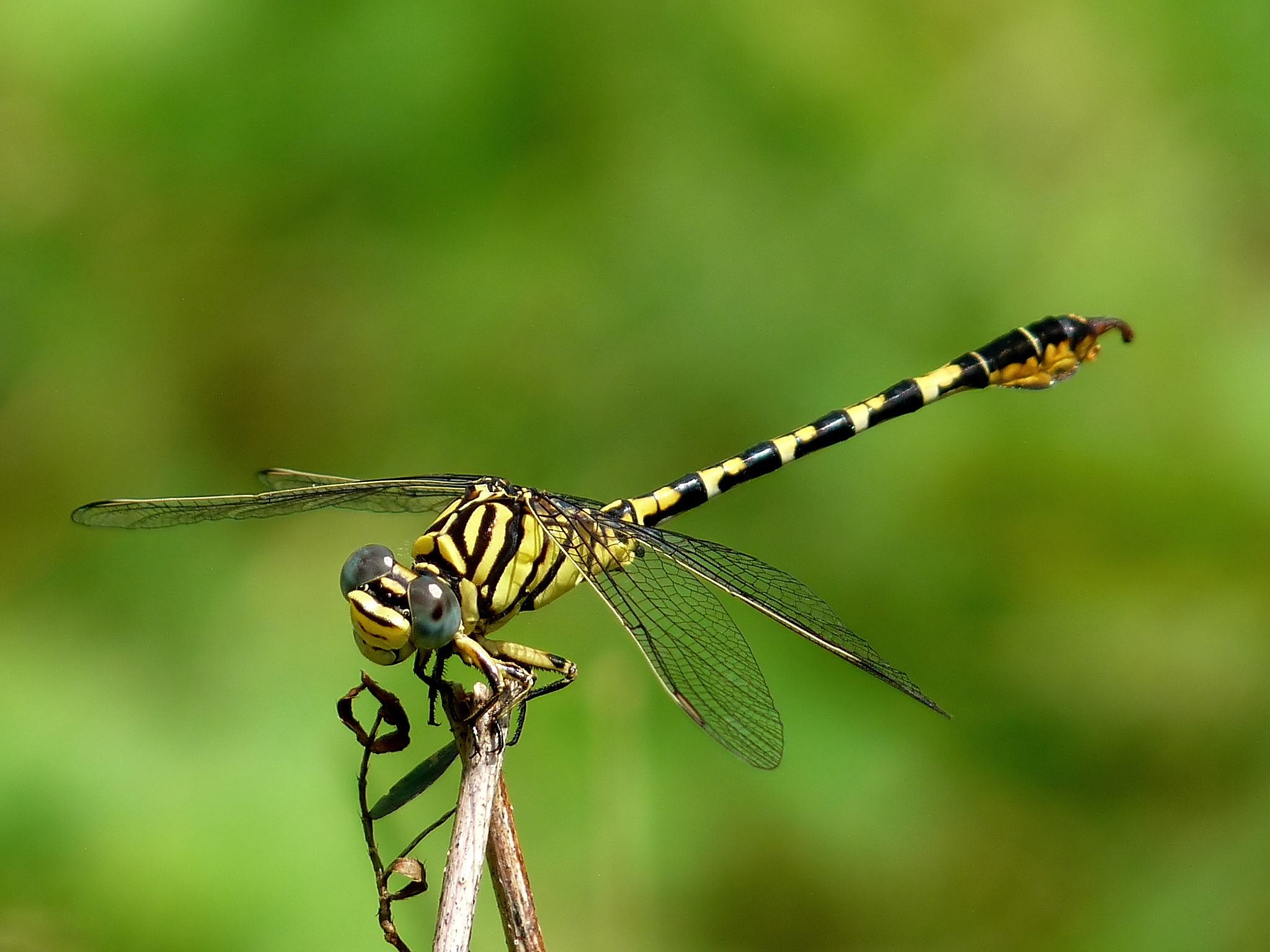
- Paragomphus lineatus, male
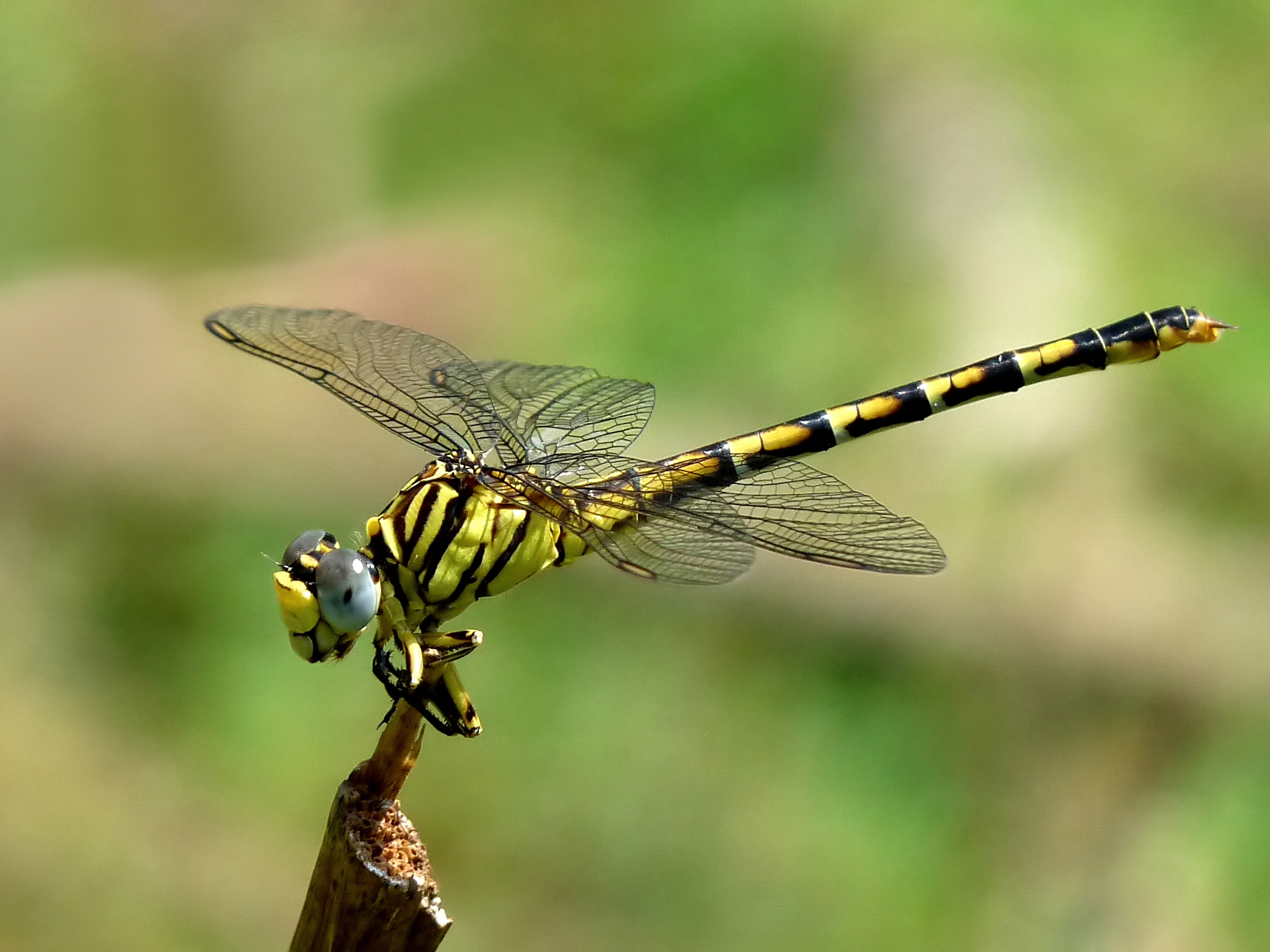
- Paragomphus lineatus, female

Scientific classification
- Kingdom: Animalia
- Phylum: Arthropoda
- Class: Insecta
- Order: Odonata
- Infraorder: Anisoptera
- Family: Gomphidae
- Genus: Paragomphus; Cowley, 1934

= Paragomphus =

Genus of dragonflies

Paragomphus is a genus of dragonfly in the family Gomphidae. They are commonly known as hooktails.

The genus contains the following species:

- Paragomphus abnormis (Karsch, 1890)
- Paragomphus alluaudi (Martin, 1915)
- Paragomphus aquila Martin, 1921
- Paragomphus aureatus Pinhey, 1971
- Paragomphus balneorum (Needham & Gyger, 1937)
- Paragomphus bredoi (Schouteden, 1934)
- Paragomphus capitatus (Martin, 1909)
- Paragomphus capricornis (Förster, 1914)
- Paragomphus cataractae Pinhey, 1963 - Cataract Hooktail
- Paragomphus cognatus (Rambur, 1842) - Rock Hooktail
- Paragomphus crenigomphoides Clausnitzer & Dijkstra, 2005
- Paragomphus echinoccipitalis (Fraser, 1922)
- Paragomphus elpidius (Ris, 1921) - Corkscrew Hooktail
- Paragomphus flavohamatus (Martin, 1921)
- Paragomphus fritillarius (Selys, 1892) - Clubbed Hooktail
- Paragomphus frontalis (Selys, 1878)
- Paragomphus genei (Selys, 1841) - Common Hooktail, Green Hooktail, Corkscrew Hooktail
- Paragomphus henryi (Laidlaw, 1928) - Brook Hooktail
- Paragomphus hoffmanni (Needham, 1931)
- Paragomphus kiautai Legrand, 1992
- Paragomphus lacustris (Karsch, 1890)
- Paragomphus lindgreni (Fraser, 1923)
- Paragomphus lineatus (Selys, 1850) - Lined Hooktail
- Paragomphus longiventris Fraser, 1955
- Paragomphus machadoi Pinhey, 1961
- Paragomphus madegassus (Karsch, 1890)
- Paragomphus magnus Fraser, 1952
- Paragomphus mariannae Legrand, 1992
- Paragomphus maynei (Schouteden, 1934)
- Paragomphus nigroviridis Cammaerts, 1969
- Paragomphus nyasicus Kimmins, 1955
- Paragomphus pardalinus Needham, 1942
- Paragomphus pumilio (Rambur, 1842) - Small Hooktail
- Paragomphus reinwardtii (Selys, 1854)
- Paragomphus sabicus (Pinhey, 1950)
- Paragomphus simplex (Lieftinck, 1934)
- Paragomphus sinaiticus (Morton, 1929)
- Paragomphus tachyerges (Lieftinck, 1934)
- Paragomphus tournieri Legrand, 1992
- Paragomphus viridior Pinhey, 1961
- Paragomphus wuzhishanensis Liu, 1988
- Paragomphus xanthus Pinhey, 1966
- Paragomphus zambeziensis Pinhey, 1961
- Paragomphus z-viridum Fraser, 1955
