= Paragomphus bredoi =

Conservation status
- Least Concern (IUCN 3.1)

Scientific classification
- Kingdom: Animalia
- Phylum: Arthropoda
- Class: Insecta
- Order: Odonata
- Infraorder: Anisoptera
- Family: Gomphidae
- Genus: Paragomphus
- Species: P. bredoi

Binomial name
- Paragomphus bredoi (Schouteden, 1934)

Species of dragonfly

Paragomphus bredoi is a species of dragonfly in the family Gomphidae. It is found in the Democratic Republic of the Congo, Malawi, and possibly Uganda. Its natural habitat is subtropical or tropical moist lowland forests. Although its status is of "Least Concern", it is still threatened by habitat destruction.
