= Paragomphus cataractae =

Conservation status
- Near Threatened (IUCN 3.1)

Scientific classification
- Kingdom: Animalia
- Phylum: Arthropoda
- Class: Insecta
- Order: Odonata
- Infraorder: Anisoptera
- Family: Gomphidae
- Genus: Paragomphus
- Species: P. cataractae

Binomial name
- Paragomphus cataractae Pinhey, 1963

Species of dragonfly

Paragomphus cataractae is a species of dragonfly in the family Gomphidae. It is found in the Kunene River basin in parts of Namibia, Zambia and Zimbabwe. Its natural habitat is rivers. It is threatened by habitat loss.
