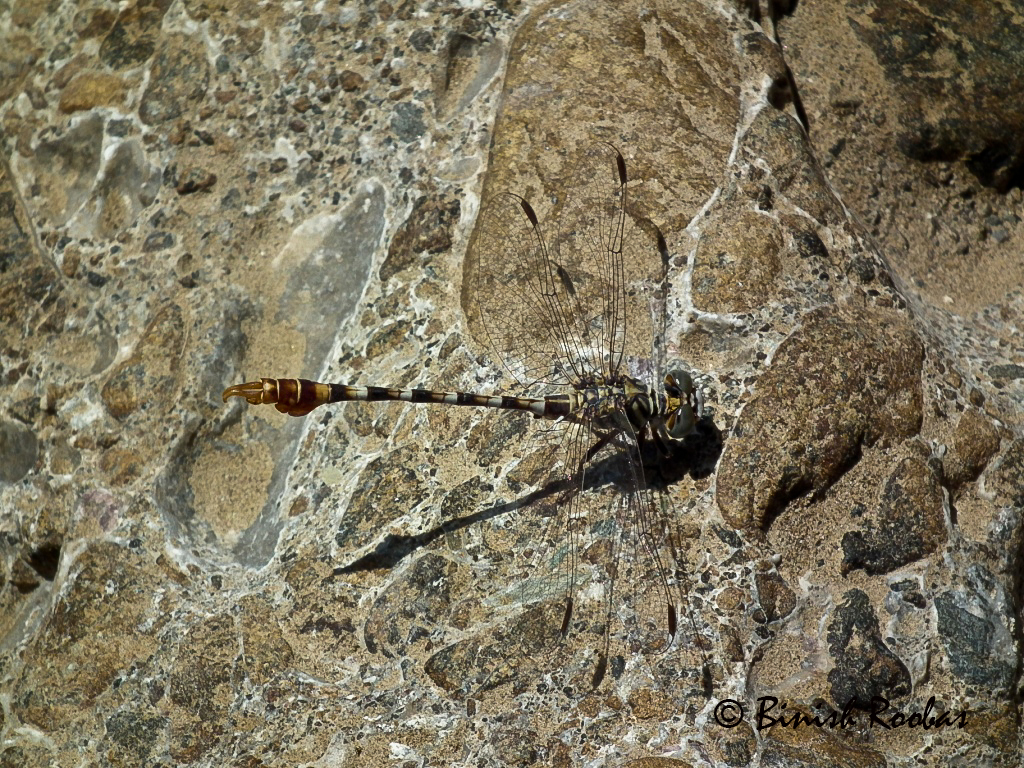

Conservation status
- Least Concern (IUCN 3.1)

Scientific classification
- Kingdom: Animalia
- Phylum: Arthropoda
- Clade: Pancrustacea
- Class: Insecta
- Order: Odonata
- Suborder: Anisoptera
- Family: Gomphidae
- Genus: Paragomphus
- Species: P. sinaiticus

Binomial name
- Paragomphus sinaiticus (Morton, 1929)

= Paragomphus sinaiticus =

Species of dragonfly

Paragomphus sinaiticus, the Sinai hooktail, is a species of dragonfly in the family Gomphidae. It is found in Egypt, Niger, Oman, Saudi Arabia, Sudan, United Arab Emirates and Yemen. Its natural habitats are rivers and freshwater springs. It is threatened by habitat loss.

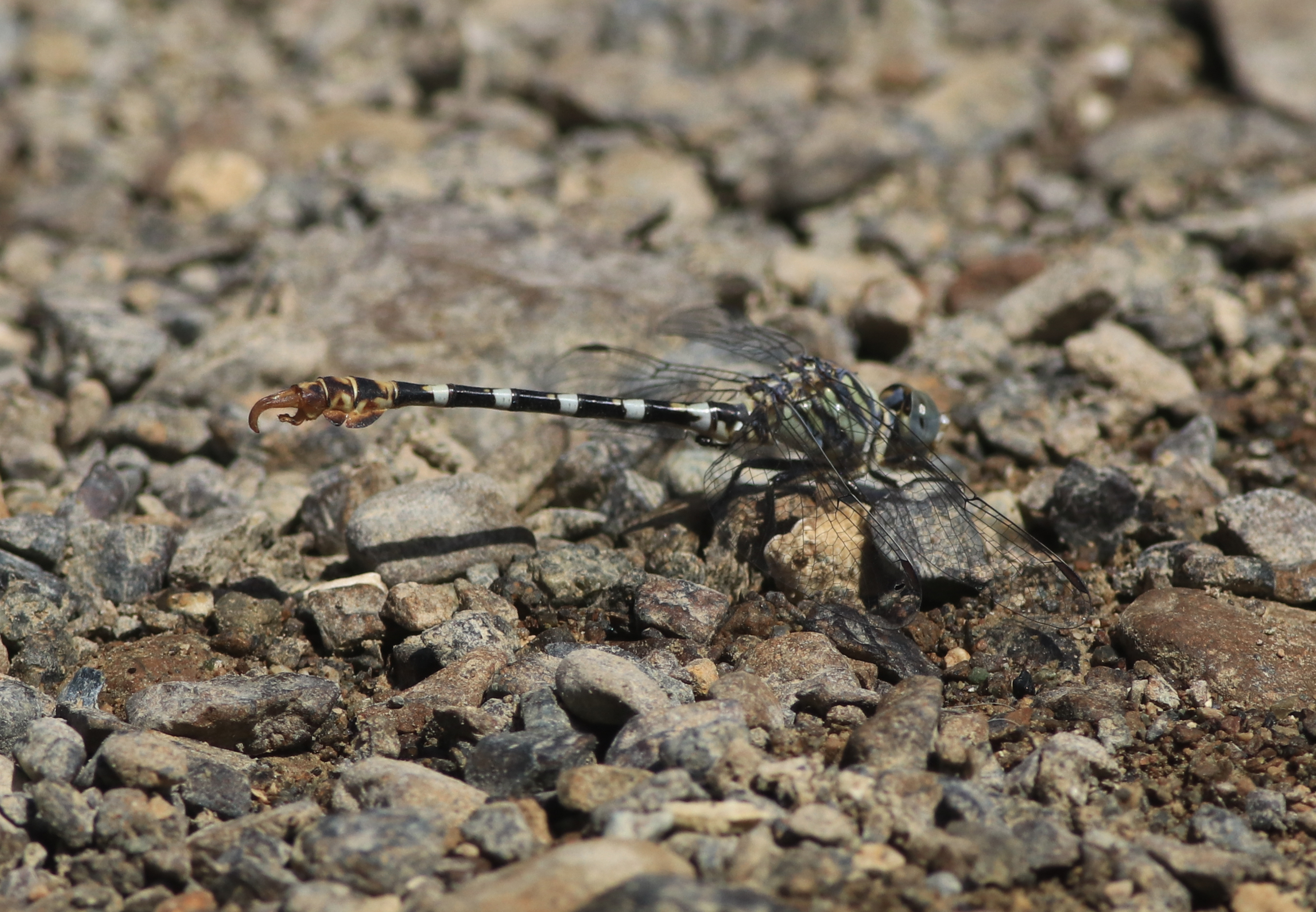
Paragomphus sinaiticus, male, from Wadi Qinan, United Arab Emirates
