= Paragomphus zambeziensis =

Conservation status
- Data Deficient (IUCN 3.1)

Scientific classification
- Kingdom: Animalia
- Phylum: Arthropoda
- Class: Insecta
- Order: Odonata
- Infraorder: Anisoptera
- Family: Gomphidae
- Genus: Paragomphus
- Species: P. zambeziensis

Binomial name
- Paragomphus zambeziensis Pinhey, 1961

Species of dragonfly

Paragomphus zambeziensis is a species of dragonfly in the family Gomphidae. It is endemic to Zimbabwe. Its natural habitat is rivers. It is threatened by habitat loss.
