= Paragomphus alluaudi =

Conservation status
- Least Concern (IUCN 3.1)

Scientific classification
- Kingdom: Animalia
- Phylum: Arthropoda
- Class: Insecta
- Order: Odonata
- Infraorder: Anisoptera
- Family: Gomphidae
- Genus: Paragomphus
- Species: P. alluaudi

Binomial name
- Paragomphus alluaudi (Martin, 1915)

Species of dragonfly

Paragomphus alluaudi is a species of dragonfly in the family Gomphidae. It is found in Angola, Ethiopia, Kenya, and Tanzania. Its natural habitats are subtropical or tropical dry shrubland, subtropical or tropical moist shrubland, and rivers. It is threatened by habitat loss.
