= Paragomphus viridior =

Conservation status
- Least Concern (IUCN 3.1)

Scientific classification
- Kingdom: Animalia
- Phylum: Arthropoda
- Class: Insecta
- Order: Odonata
- Infraorder: Anisoptera
- Family: Gomphidae
- Genus: Paragomphus
- Species: P. viridior

Binomial name
- Paragomphus viridior Pinhey, 1961

Species of dragonfly

Paragomphus viridior is a species of dragonfly in the family Gomphidae. It is found in Kenya, Sudan, and Uganda. Its natural habitats are subtropical or tropical moist lowland forests and rivers.
