= Paragomphus lacustris =

Conservation status
- Least Concern (IUCN 3.1)

Scientific classification
- Kingdom: Animalia
- Phylum: Arthropoda
- Class: Insecta
- Order: Odonata
- Infraorder: Anisoptera
- Family: Gomphidae
- Genus: Paragomphus
- Species: P. lacustris

Binomial name
- Paragomphus lacustris (Karsch, 1890)

Species of dragonfly

Paragomphus lacustris is a species of dragonfly in the family Gomphidae. It is found in the Democratic Republic of the Congo, Tanzania, and possibly Uganda. Its natural habitat is freshwater lakes.
