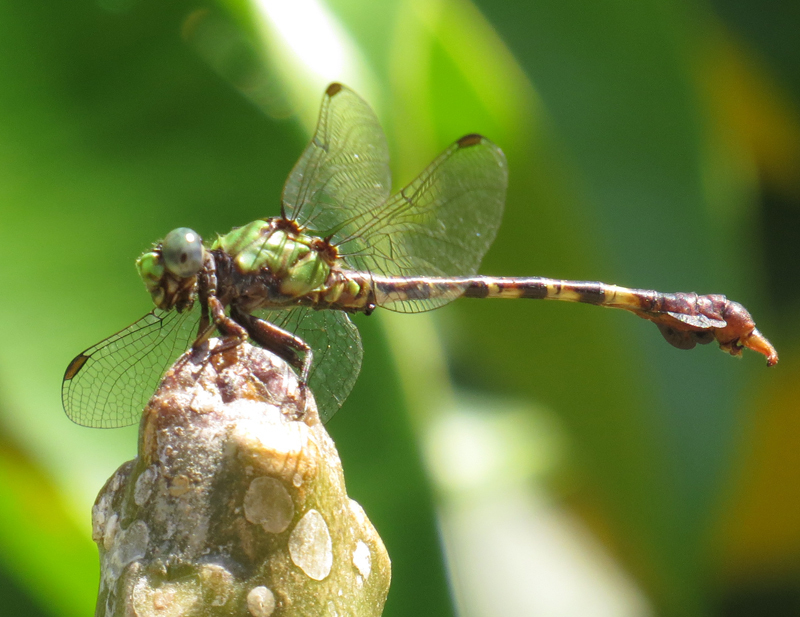

Conservation status
- Least Concern (IUCN 3.1)

Scientific classification
- Kingdom: Animalia
- Phylum: Arthropoda
- Class: Insecta
- Order: Odonata
- Infraorder: Anisoptera
- Family: Gomphidae
- Genus: Paragomphus
- Species: P. nyasicus

Binomial name
- Paragomphus nyasicus Kimmins, 1955

= Paragomphus nyasicus =

Species of dragonfly

Paragomphus nyasicus is a species of dragonfly in the family Gomphidae. It is found in Malawi and possibly Zimbabwe. Its natural habitat is freshwater lakes. It is threatened by habitat loss.
