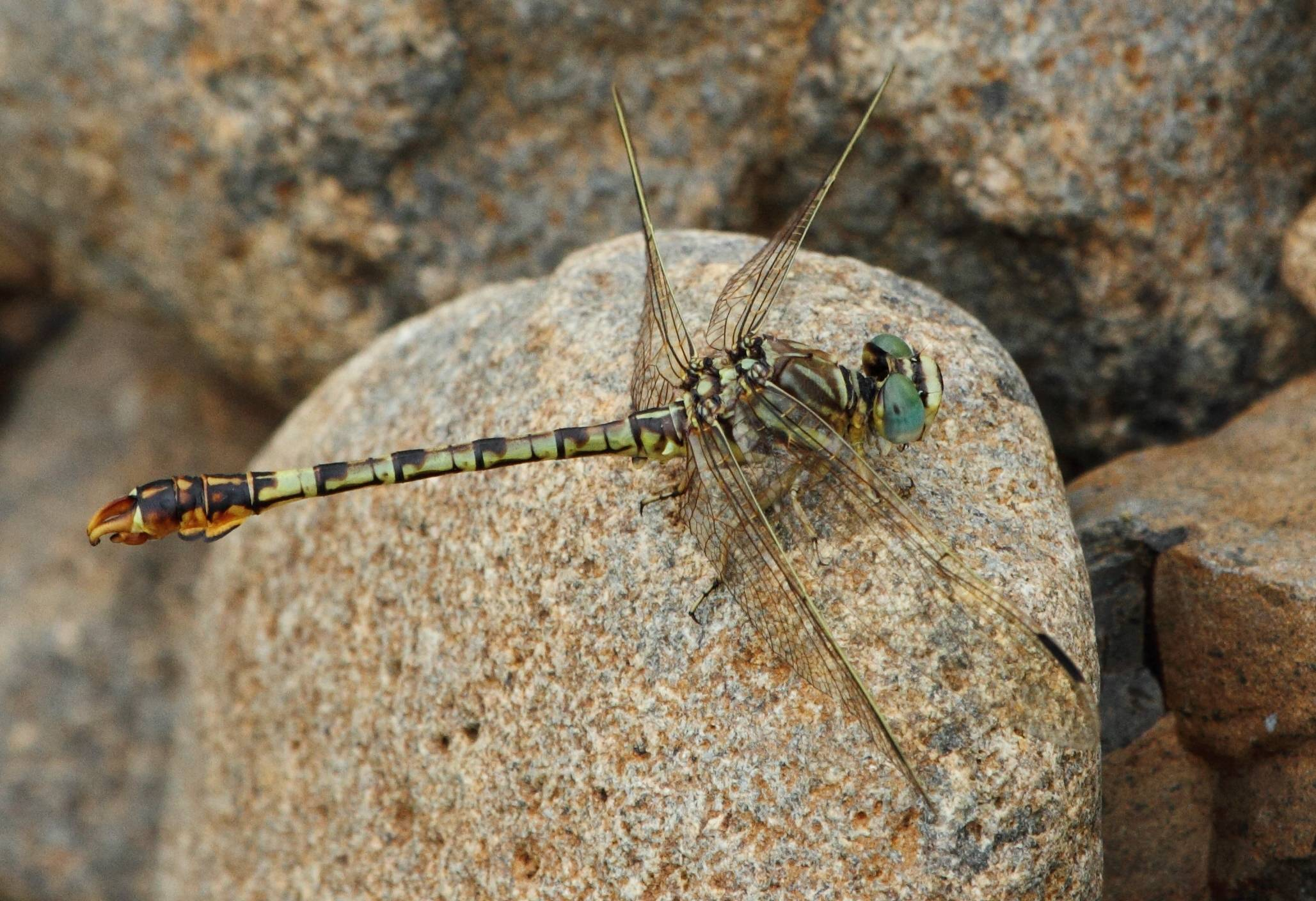
- Crenigomphus hartmanni

Scientific classification
- Kingdom: Animalia
- Phylum: Arthropoda
- Class: Insecta
- Order: Odonata
- Infraorder: Anisoptera
- Family: Gomphidae
- Genus: Crenigomphus; Selys, 1892

= Crenigomphus =

Genus of dragonflies

Crenigomphus is a genus of dragonflies in the family Gomphidae. It contains the following species:

- Crenigomphus abyssinicus
- Crenigomphus denticulatus
- Crenigomphus hartmanni
- Crenigomphus renei
