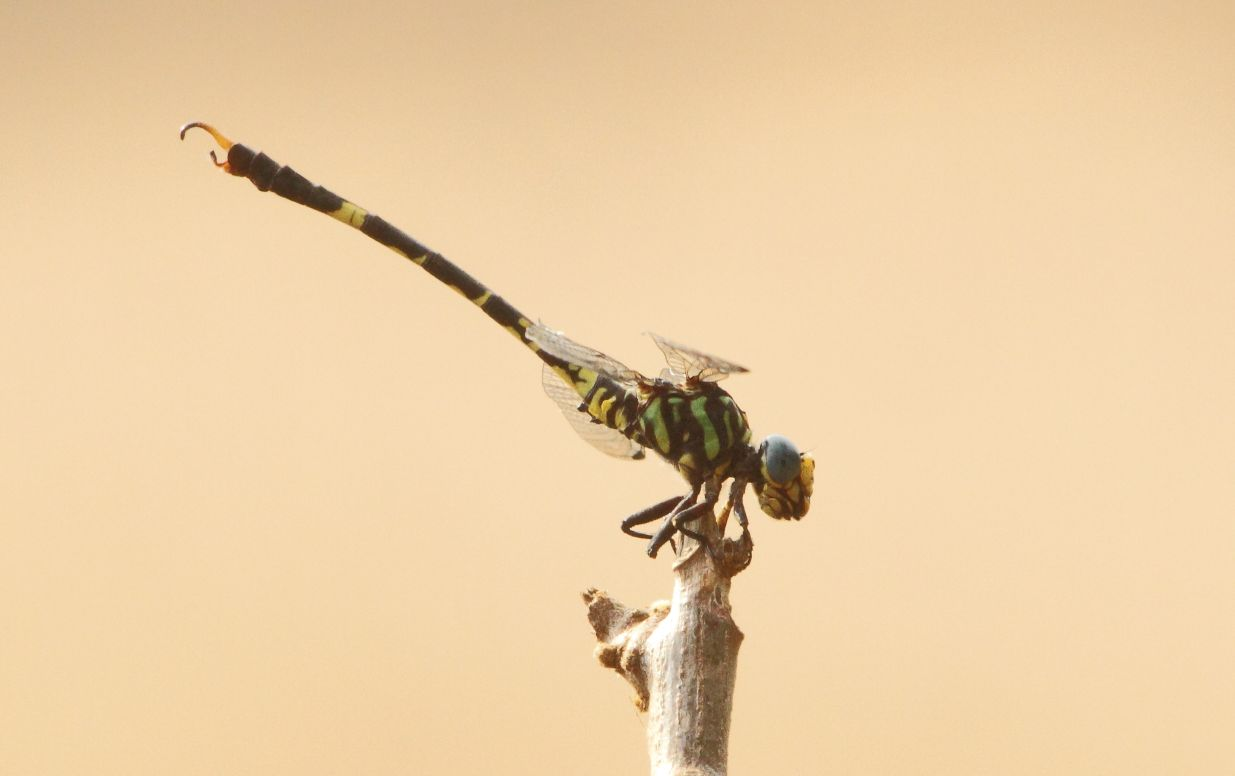
- Male

Conservation status
- Least Concern (IUCN 3.1)

Scientific classification
- Kingdom: Animalia
- Phylum: Arthropoda
- Class: Insecta
- Order: Odonata
- Infraorder: Anisoptera
- Family: Gomphidae
- Genus: Paragomphus
- Species: P. magnus

Binomial name
- Paragomphus magnus Fraser, 1952

= Paragomphus magnus =

Species of dragonfly

Paragomphus magnus, the great hooktail, is a species of dragonfly in the family Gomphidae.

== Distribution and status ==
This species is found in Kenya, Mozambique, Tanzania, Zimbabwe and South Africa. Although uncommon, it has a large range, and is not considered threatened.

== Habitat ==
Natural habitats include subtropical and tropical rivers and streams in wooded country at low elevations.

== Gallery ==
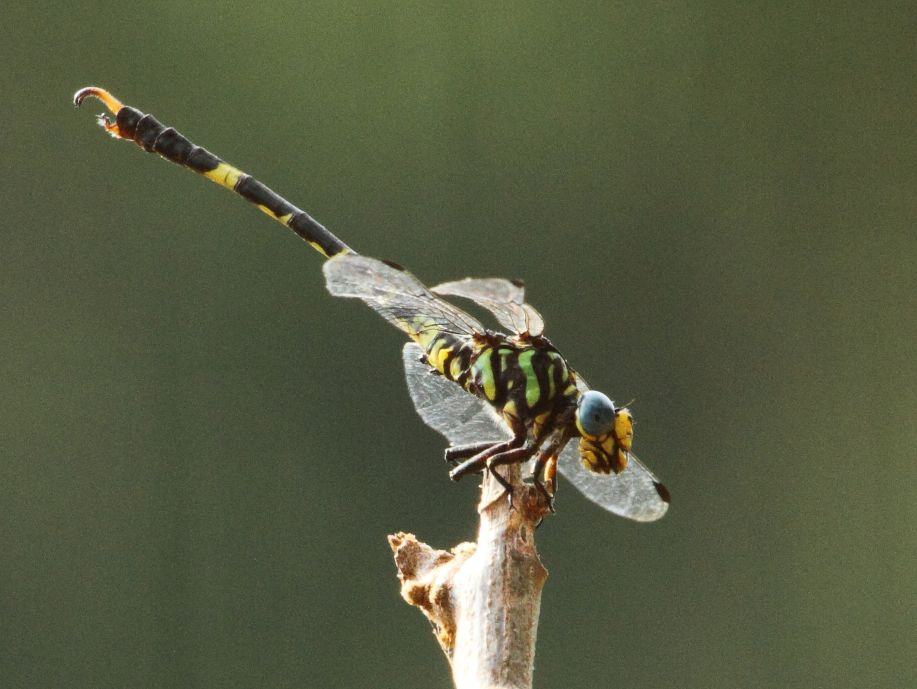
A male in Makhathini, KwaZulu-Natal, South Africa
