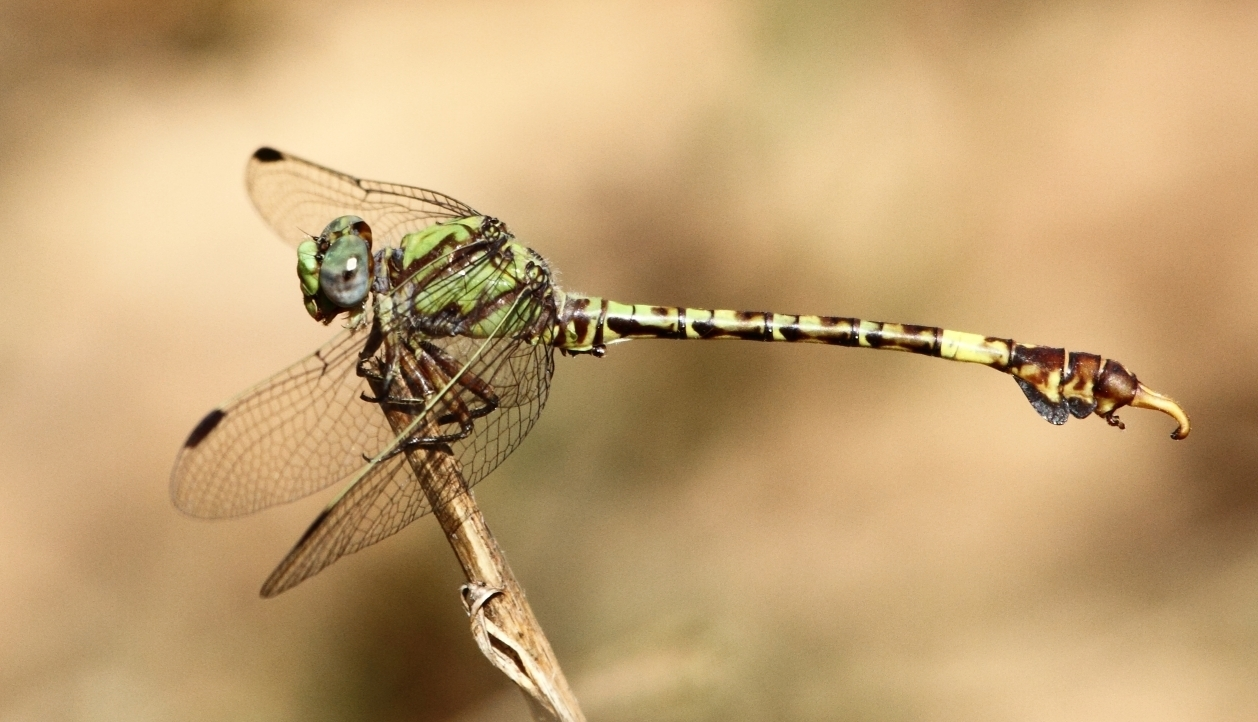
- Male

Conservation status
- Least Concern (IUCN 3.1)

Scientific classification
- Kingdom: Animalia
- Phylum: Arthropoda
- Class: Insecta
- Order: Odonata
- Infraorder: Anisoptera
- Family: Gomphidae
- Genus: Paragomphus
- Species: P. elpidius

Binomial name
- Paragomphus elpidius (Ris, 1921)

= Paragomphus elpidius =

Species of dragonfly

Paragomphus elpidius, the corkscrew hooktail, is a species of dragonfly in the family Gomphidae. It is found in Botswana, the Democratic Republic of the Congo, Kenya, Malawi, Mozambique, Namibia, South Africa, Tanzania, Uganda, Zambia, Zimbabwe, and possibly Burundi. Its natural habitats are subtropical or tropical moist lowland forests, dry savanna, moist savanna, subtropical or tropical dry shrubland, subtropical or tropical moist shrubland, rivers, freshwater lakes, intermittent freshwater lakes, freshwater marshes, and intermittent freshwater marshes.
