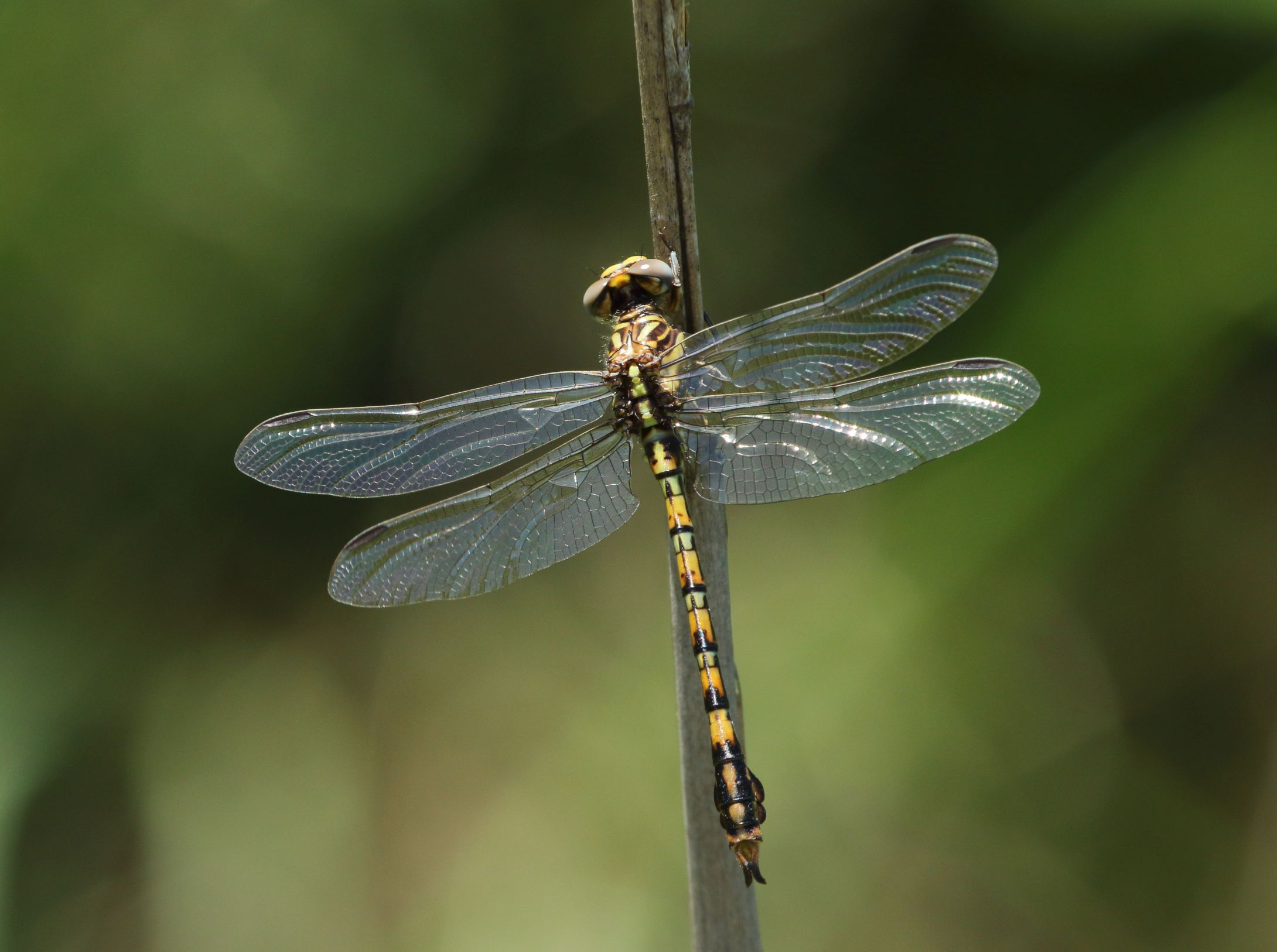
- Male

Conservation status
- Least Concern (IUCN 3.1)

Scientific classification
- Kingdom: Animalia
- Phylum: Arthropoda
- Class: Insecta
- Order: Odonata
- Infraorder: Anisoptera
- Family: Gomphidae
- Genus: Paragomphus
- Species: P. cognatus

Binomial name
- Paragomphus cognatus (Rambur, 1842)

= Paragomphus cognatus =

Species of dragonfly

Paragomphus cognatus, the rock hooktail, is a species of dragonfly in the family Gomphidae.

== Distribution ==
It is found in Africa, from South Africa to Democratic Republic of the Congo, Uganda and Kenya.

== Habitat ==
Its natural habitats are streams and rivers in a wide variety of vegetation types, including fynbos and grassland, savanna and forest.

== Identification ==
Male: Key features for identification of the males are the shape of the cerci (appendages at the end of the abdomen of males) and the pattern of the markings on the thorax. The ends of the cerci diverge, and they are thick and truncate. In southern Africa (south of 15°S), the shape of the cerci separate this species from other dragonflies.

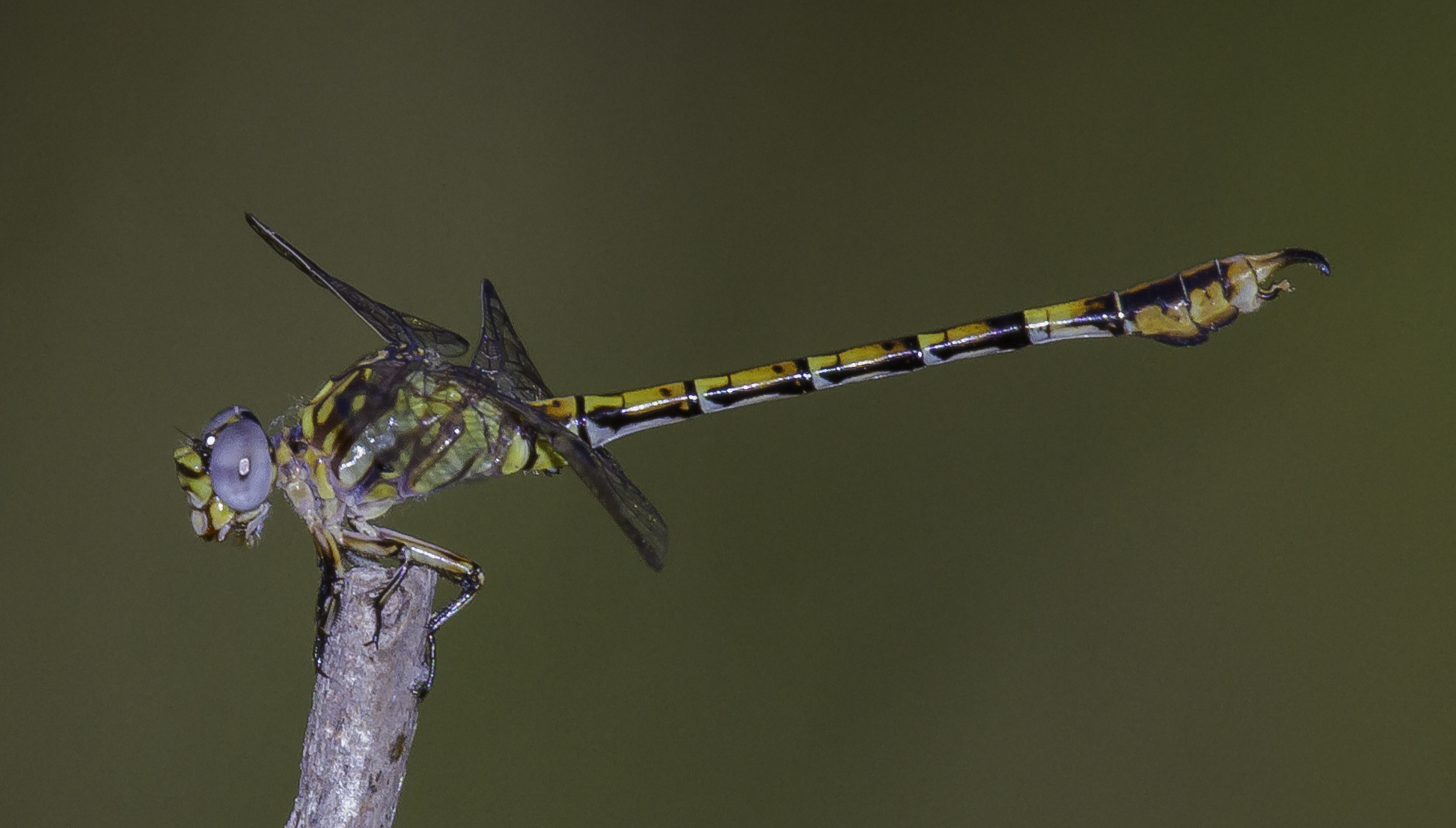
Male rock hooktail; side view

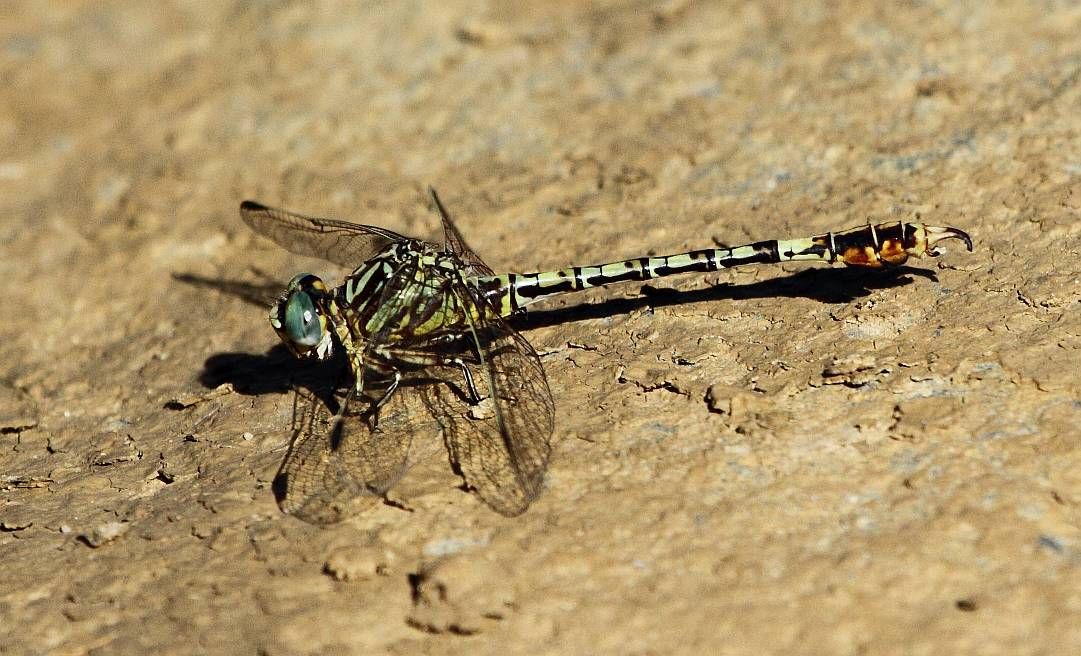
Male

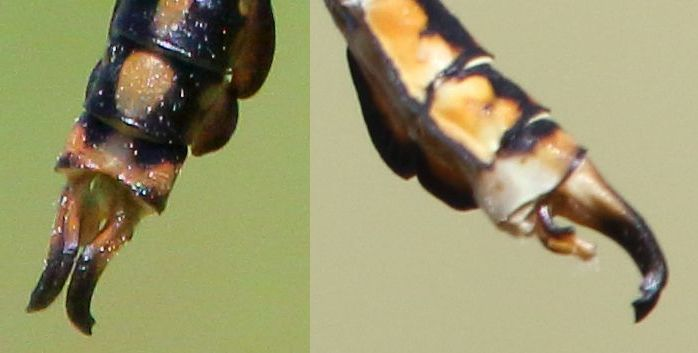
Male abdomen: S9, S10, cerci and epiproct

== Habits ==
Frequents rocky streams, rivers, river-pools. Typically perches on mid-stream rocks.
