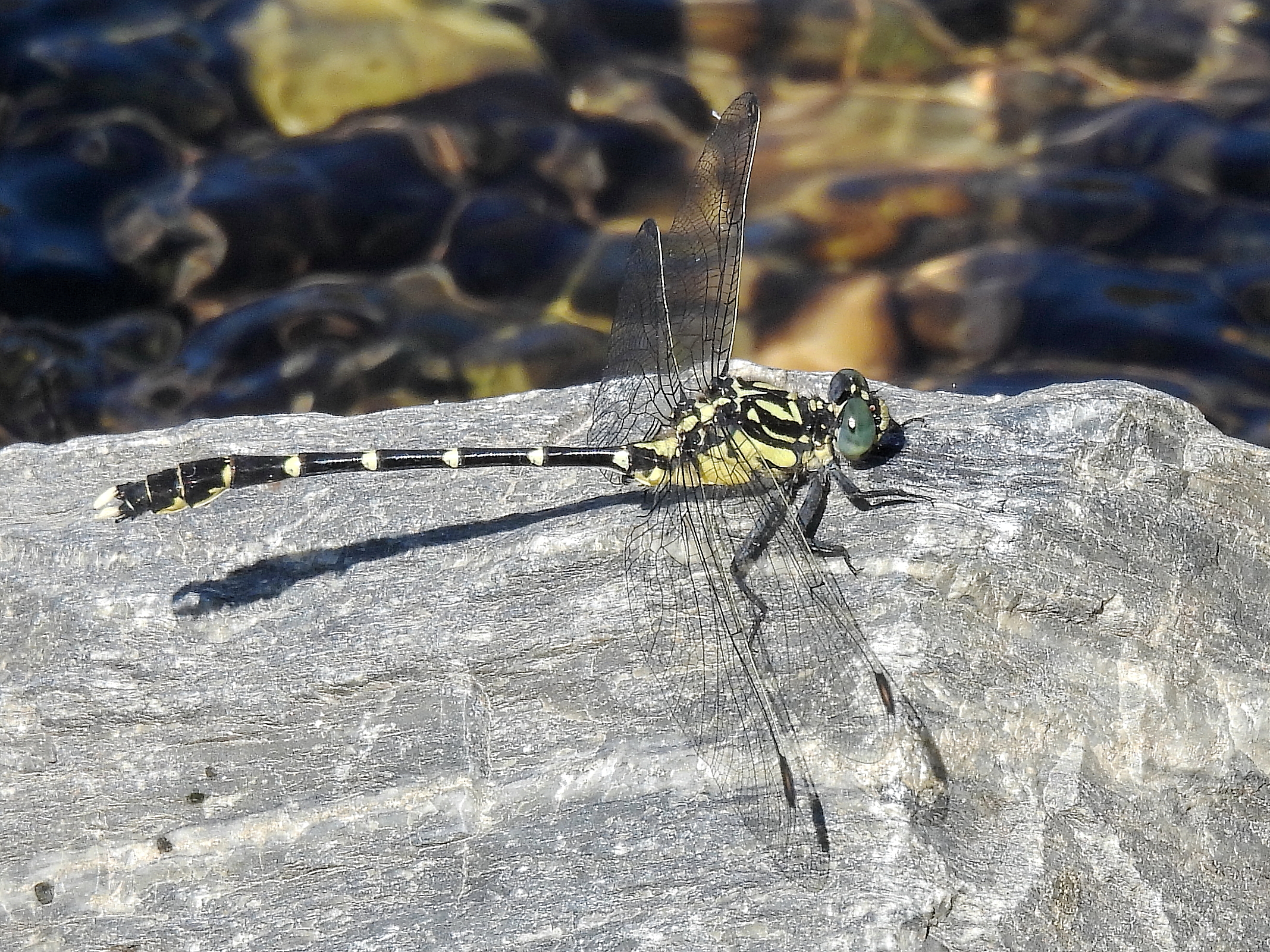
- Male, Brisbane

Conservation status
- Least Concern (IUCN 3.1)

Scientific classification
- Kingdom: Animalia
- Phylum: Arthropoda
- Clade: Pancrustacea
- Class: Insecta
- Order: Odonata
- Suborder: Anisoptera
- Family: Gomphidae
- Genus: Hemigomphus
- Species: H. heteroclytus

Binomial name
- Hemigomphus heteroclytus Selys, 1854

= Hemigomphus heteroclytus =

Stout vicetail

Species of dragonfly

Hemigomphus heteroclytus is a species of dragonfly of the family Gomphidae, known as the stout vicetail. It is a small, black and yellow dragonfly, endemic to eastern Australia, where it inhabits streams that reduce to trickles in summer.

Hemigomphus heteroclytus is similar to Hemigomphus gouldii, the southern vicetail, also found in eastern Australia.

== Etymology ==
The genus name Hemigomphus is derived from the Greek ἡμι- (hēmi, "half"), combined with Gomphus, a genus name derived from the Greek γόμφος (gomphos, "peg" or "nail"), referring to the shape of the male abdomen. The name refers to the close relationship of the genus to Gomphus.

The species name heteroclytus is derived from the Greek ἕτερος (heteros, "other" or "different") and κλυτός (klytos, "renowned", "glorious" or "splendid"), likely referring to the presence of a yellow half-collar, absent in other members of the genus Hemigomphus.

== Gallery ==
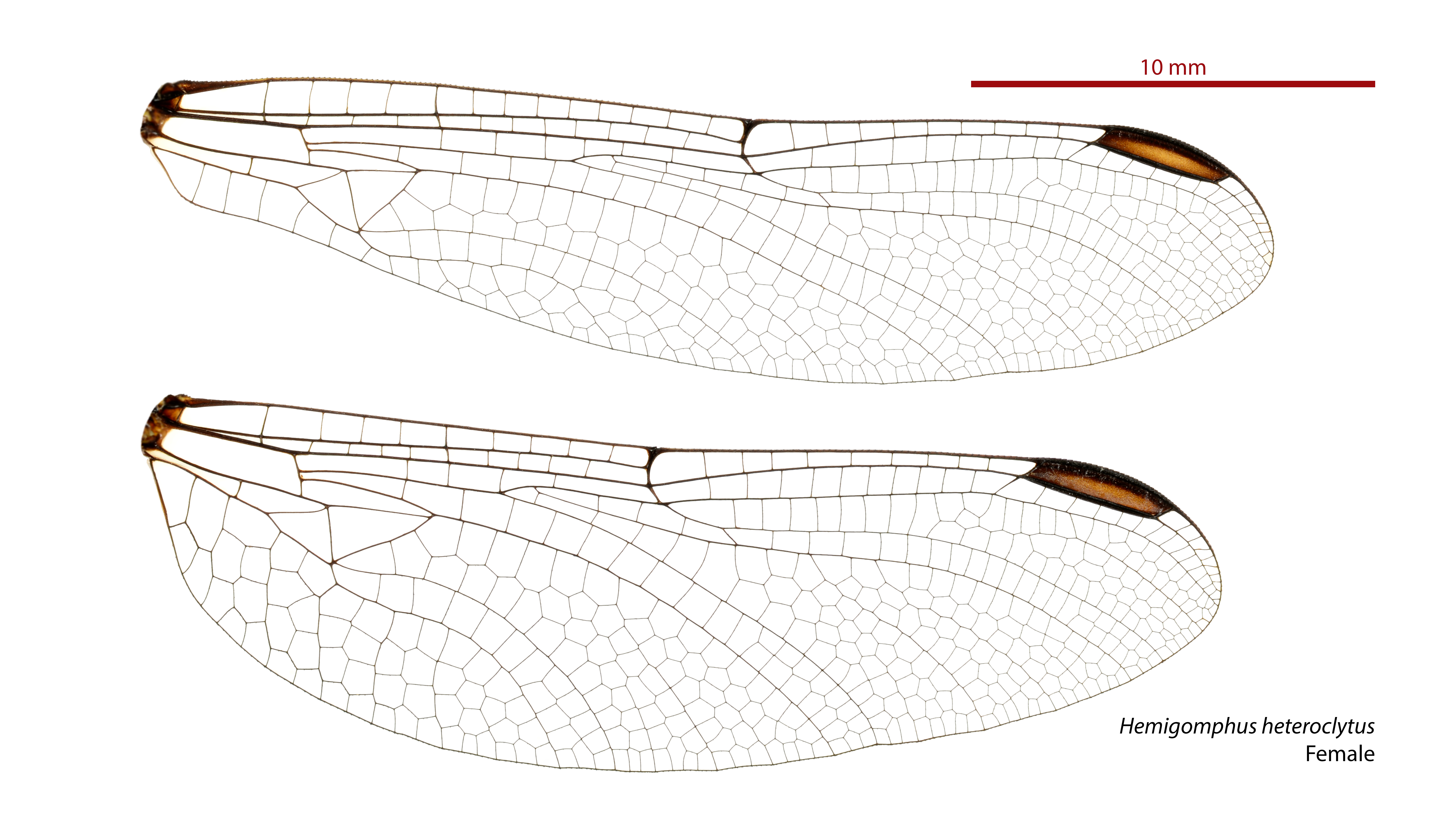
Female wings

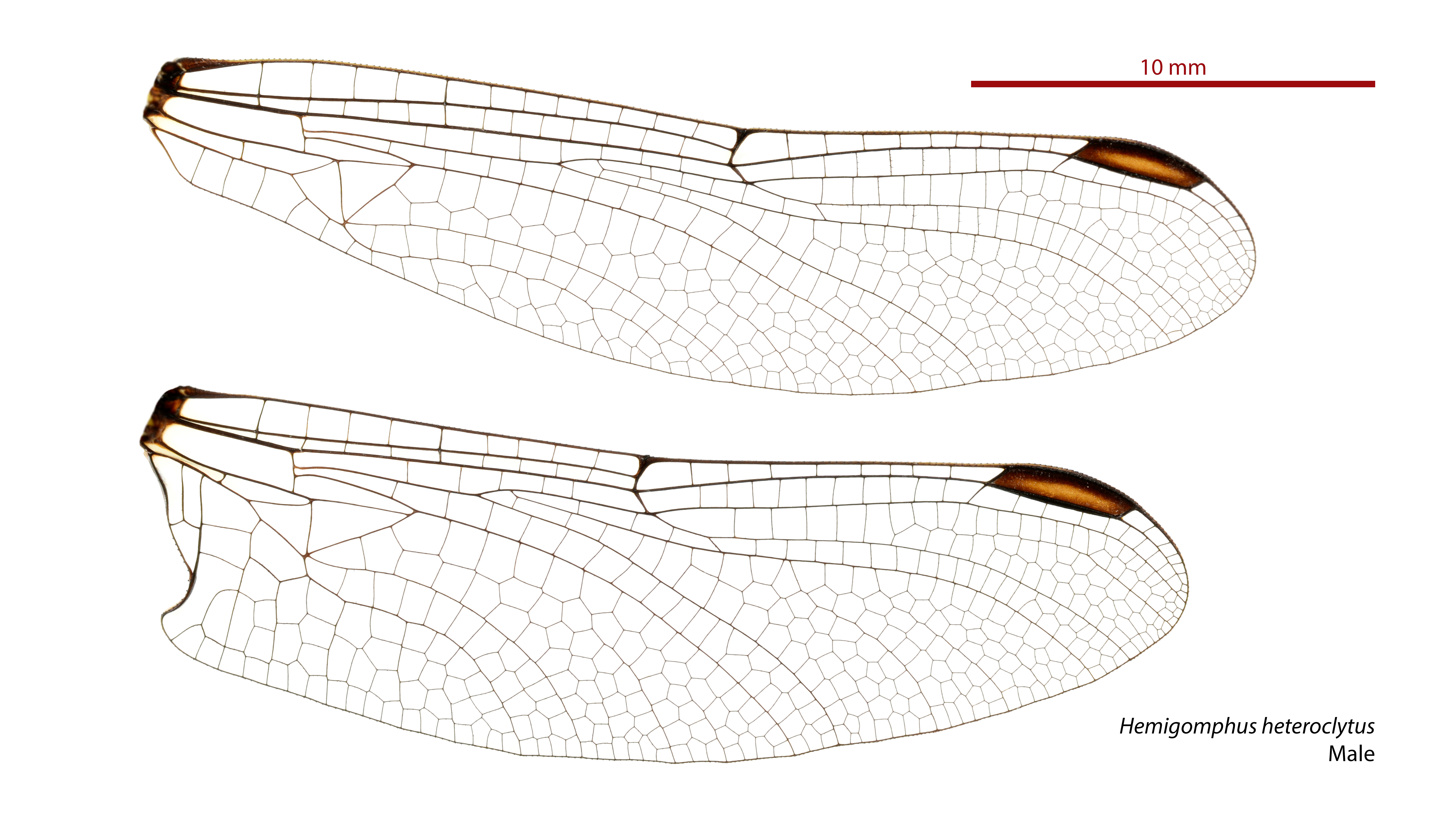
Male wings

== See also ==
- List of Odonata species of Australia
