= Hemigomphus magela =

Kakadu vicetail

Conservation status
- Near Threatened (IUCN 3.1)

Scientific classification
- Kingdom: Animalia
- Phylum: Arthropoda
- Clade: Pancrustacea
- Class: Insecta
- Order: Odonata
- Suborder: Anisoptera
- Family: Gomphidae
- Genus: Hemigomphus
- Species: H. magela

Binomial name
- Hemigomphus magela Watson, 1991

Species of dragonfly

Hemigomphus magela is a species of dragonfly of the family Gomphidae, known as the Kakadu vicetail. It is a small, black and yellow dragonfly, endemic to Northern Territory, Australia, where it inhabits streams.

== Etymology ==
The genus name Hemigomphus is derived from the Greek ἡμι- (hēmi, "half"), combined with Gomphus, a genus name derived from the Greek γόμφος (gomphos, "peg" or "nail"), referring to the shape of the male abdomen. The name refers to the close relationship of the genus to Gomphus.

The species name magela refers to Magela Creek in western Arnhem Land, Northern Territory, where the species was first recorded.

== Gallery ==
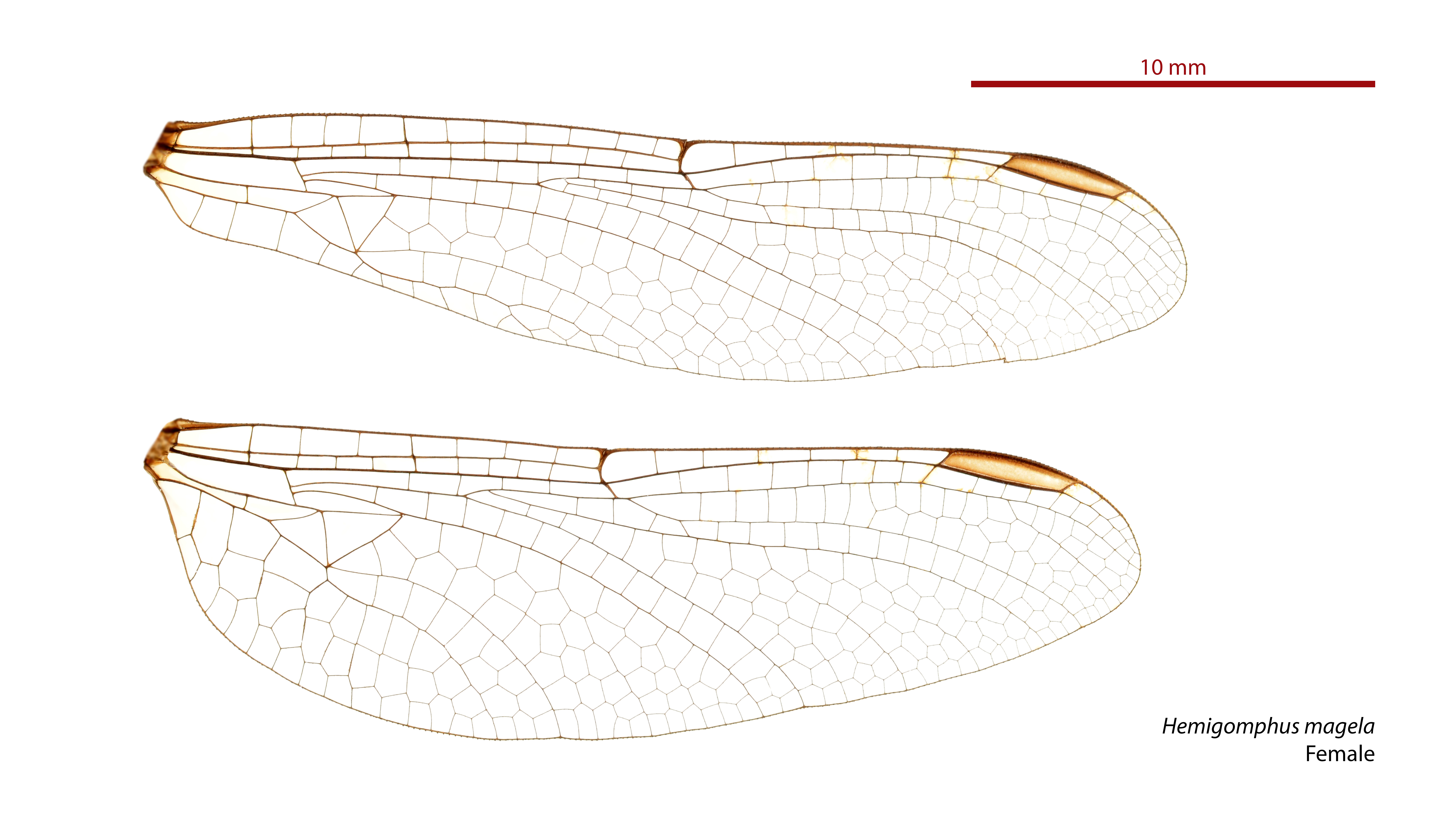
Female wings

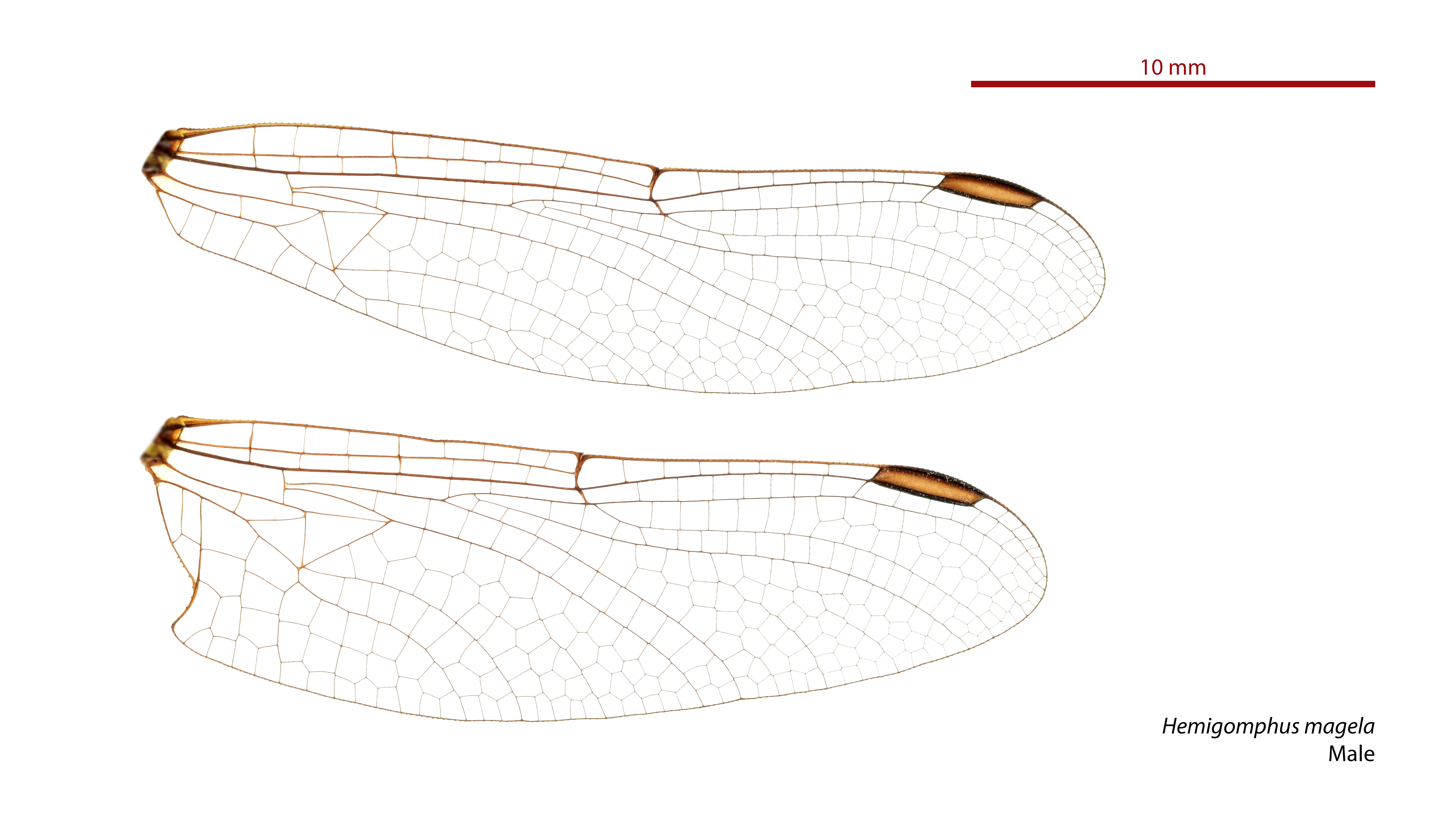
Male wings

== See also ==
- List of Odonata species of Australia
