= Hemigomphus atratus =

Black vicetail

Conservation status
- Data Deficient (IUCN 3.1)

Scientific classification
- Kingdom: Animalia
- Phylum: Arthropoda
- Clade: Pancrustacea
- Class: Insecta
- Order: Odonata
- Suborder: Anisoptera
- Family: Gomphidae
- Genus: Hemigomphus
- Species: H. atratus

Binomial name
- Hemigomphus atratus Watson, 1991

Species of dragonfly

Hemigomphus atratus is a species of dragonfly of the family Gomphidae, known as the black vicetail. It is endemic to north-eastern Queensland, Australia, where it inhabits rainforest streams.

Hemigomphus atratus is a small, black and yellow dragonfly. Very little other information is known of this species, all of it coming from a single specimen found living at a freshwater stream near Tinaroo Dam, in north-eastern Queensland.

== Etymology ==
The genus name Hemigomphus is derived from the Greek ἡμι- (hēmi, "half"), combined with Gomphus, a genus name derived from the Greek γόμφος (gomphos, "peg" or "nail"), referring to the shape of the male abdomen. The name refers to the close relationship of the genus to Gomphus.

The species name atratus is a Latin word meaning clothed in black. Tony Watson named this species of dragonfly after its blackish brown abdomen.

== Gallery ==
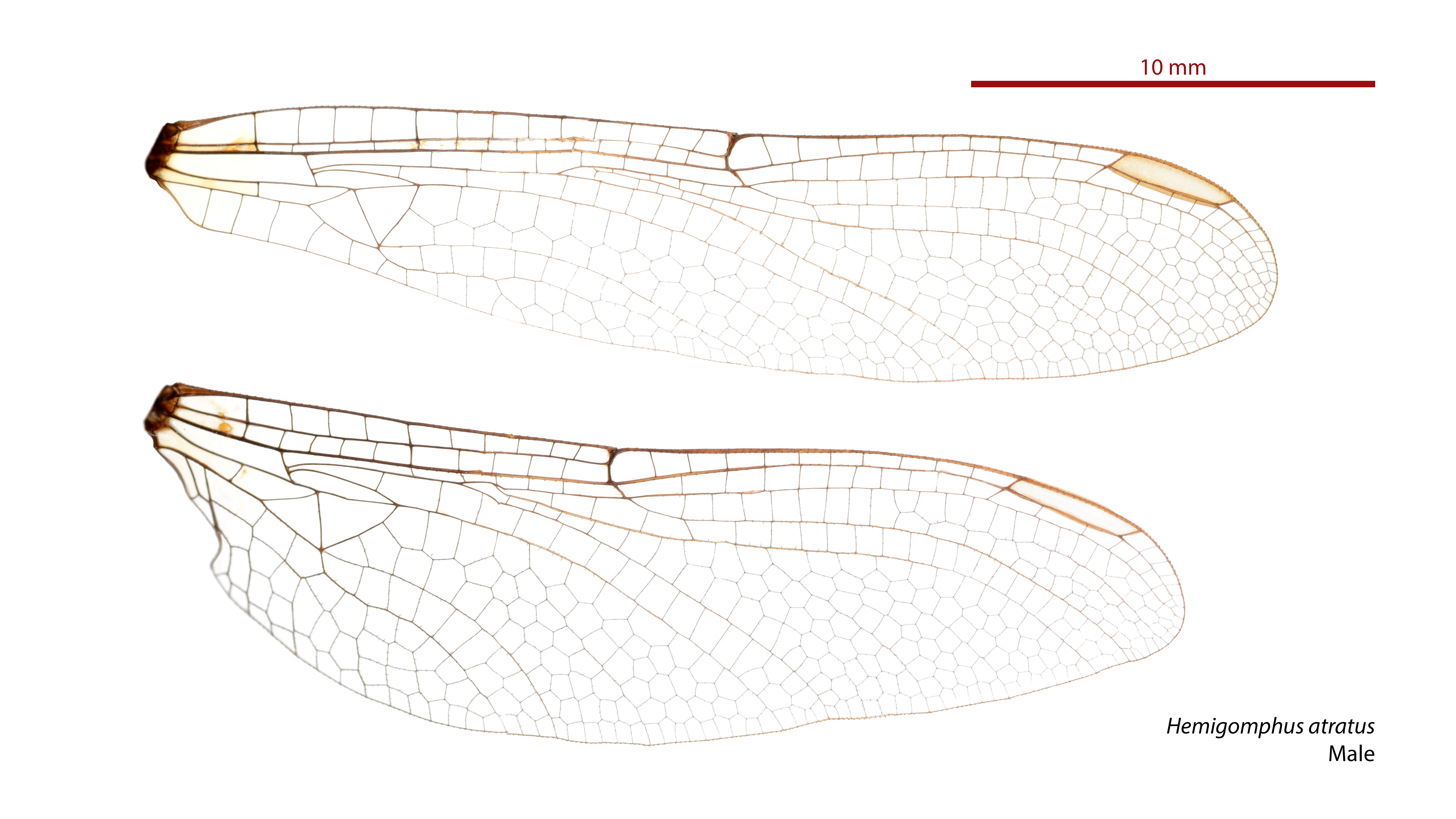
Male wings

== See also ==
- List of Odonata species of Australia
