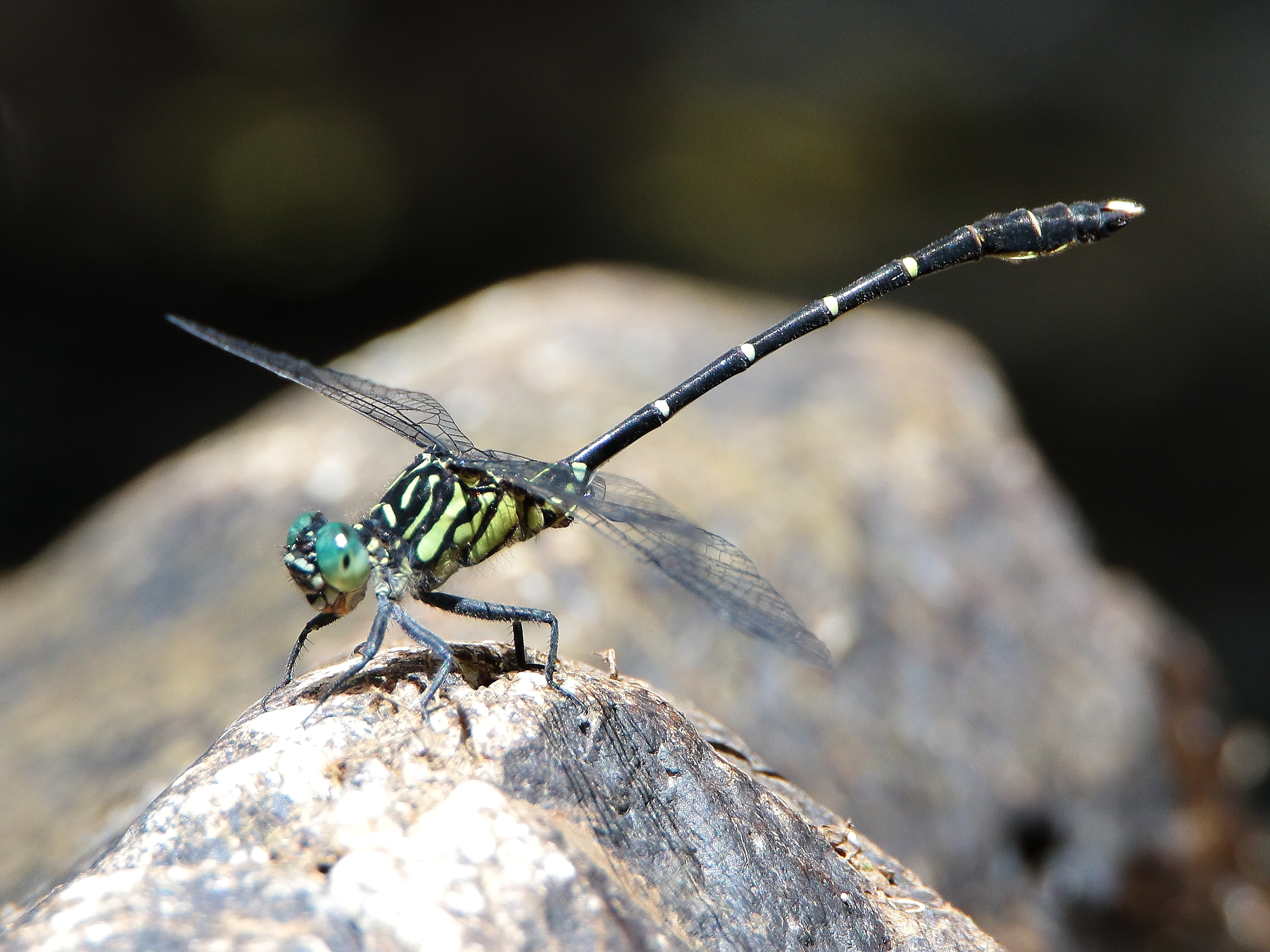
- Male, Cairns

Conservation status
- Near Threatened (IUCN 3.1)

Scientific classification
- Kingdom: Animalia
- Phylum: Arthropoda
- Clade: Pancrustacea
- Class: Insecta
- Order: Odonata
- Suborder: Anisoptera
- Family: Gomphidae
- Genus: Hemigomphus
- Species: H. theischingeri

Binomial name
- Hemigomphus theischingeri Watson, 1991

= Hemigomphus theischingeri =

Rainforest vicetail

Species of insect

Hemigomphus theischingeri is a species of dragonfly of the family Gomphidae, known as the rainforest vicetail. It is a small, black and yellow dragonfly, endemic to northern Queensland, Australia, where it inhabits rainforest streams.

== Etymology ==
The genus name Hemigomphus is derived from the Greek ἡμι- (hēmi, "half"), combined with Gomphus, a genus name derived from the Greek γόμφος (gomphos, "peg" or "nail"), referring to the shape of the male abdomen. The name refers to the close relationship of the genus to Gomphus.

In 1991, Tony Watson named this species theischingeri, an eponym honouring his colleague Günther Theischinger.

== Gallery ==
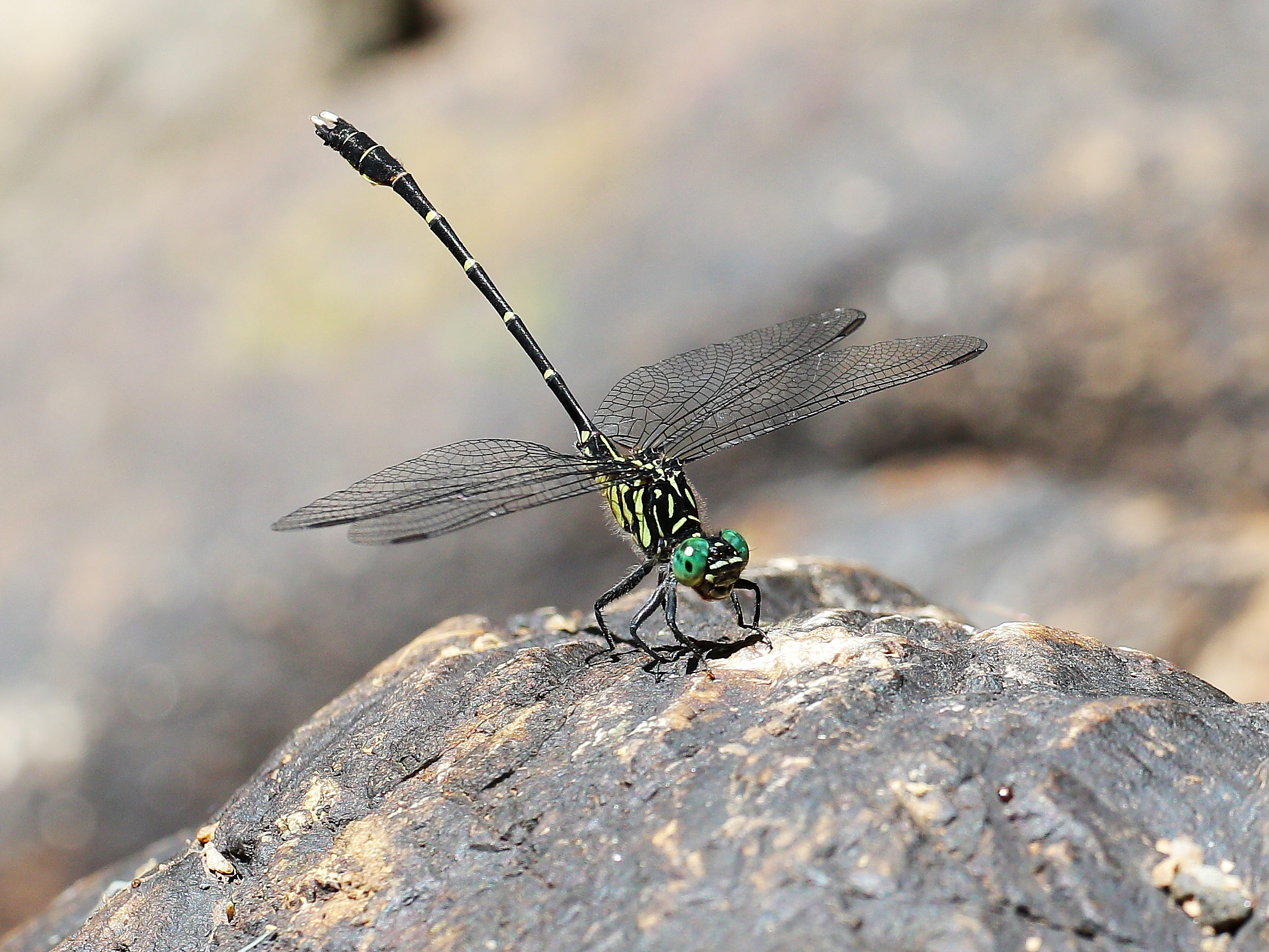
male, Cairns

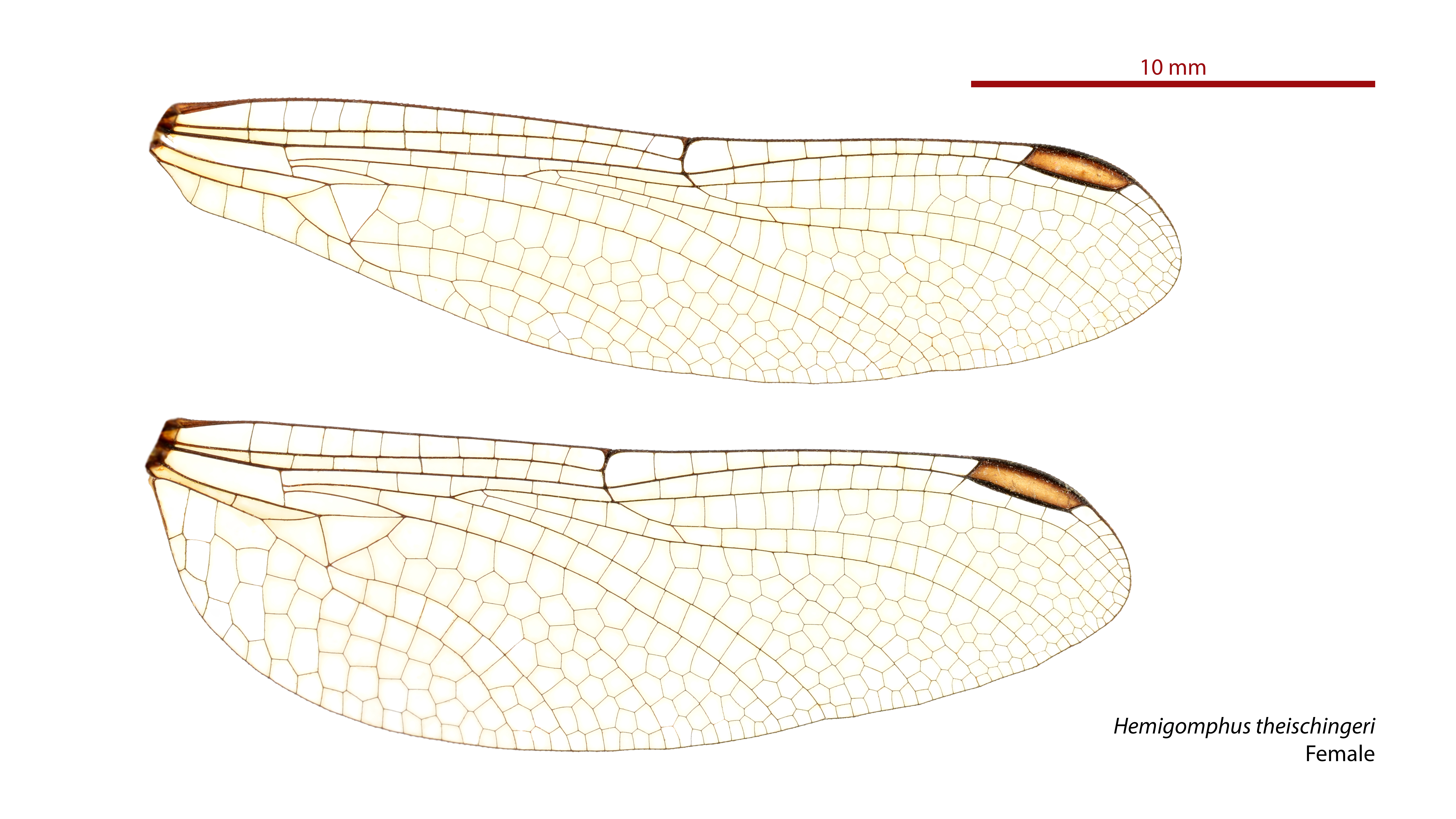
Female wings

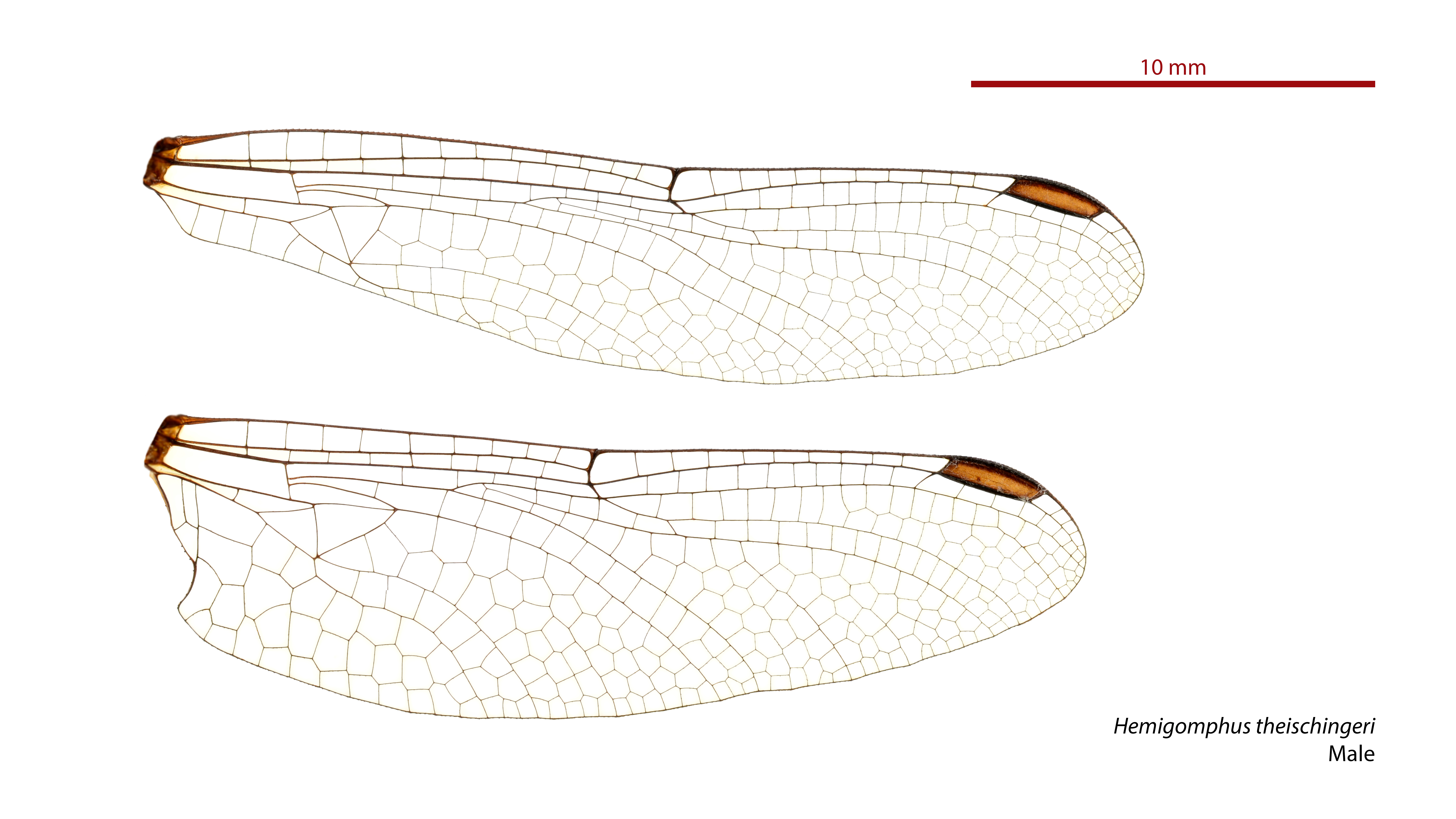
Male wings

== See also ==
- List of Odonata species of Australia
