= Hemigomphus cooloola =

Wallum vicetail

Conservation status
- Endangered (IUCN 3.1)

Scientific classification
- Kingdom: Animalia
- Phylum: Arthropoda
- Clade: Pancrustacea
- Class: Insecta
- Order: Odonata
- Suborder: Anisoptera
- Family: Gomphidae
- Genus: Hemigomphus
- Species: H. cooloola

Binomial name
- Hemigomphus cooloola Watson, 1991

Species of dragonfly

Hemigomphus cooloola is a species of dragonfly in the family Gomphidae, known as the Wallum vicetail. It is a small, black and yellow dragonfly, endemic to south-eastern Queensland, Australia, where it inhabits sandy, slow streams and lakes.

== Etymology ==
The genus name Hemigomphus is derived from the Greek ἡμι- (hēmi, "half"), combined with Gomphus, a genus name derived from the Greek γόμφος (gomphos, "peg" or "nail"), referring to the shape of the male abdomen. The name refers to the close relationship of the genus to Gomphus.

The species name cooloola refers to Cooloola National Park in Queensland, where the species was first recorded.

== Gallery ==
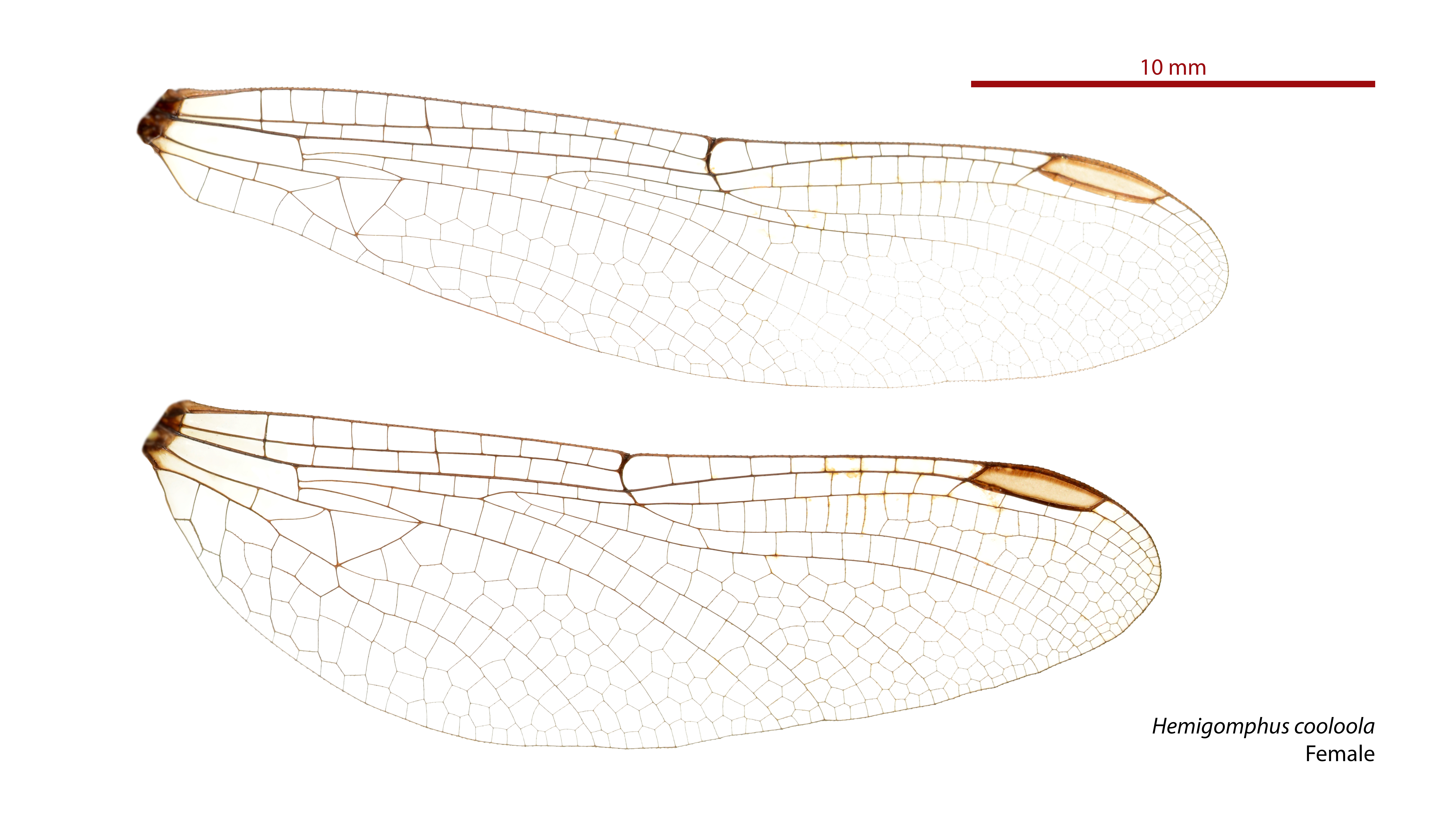
Female wings

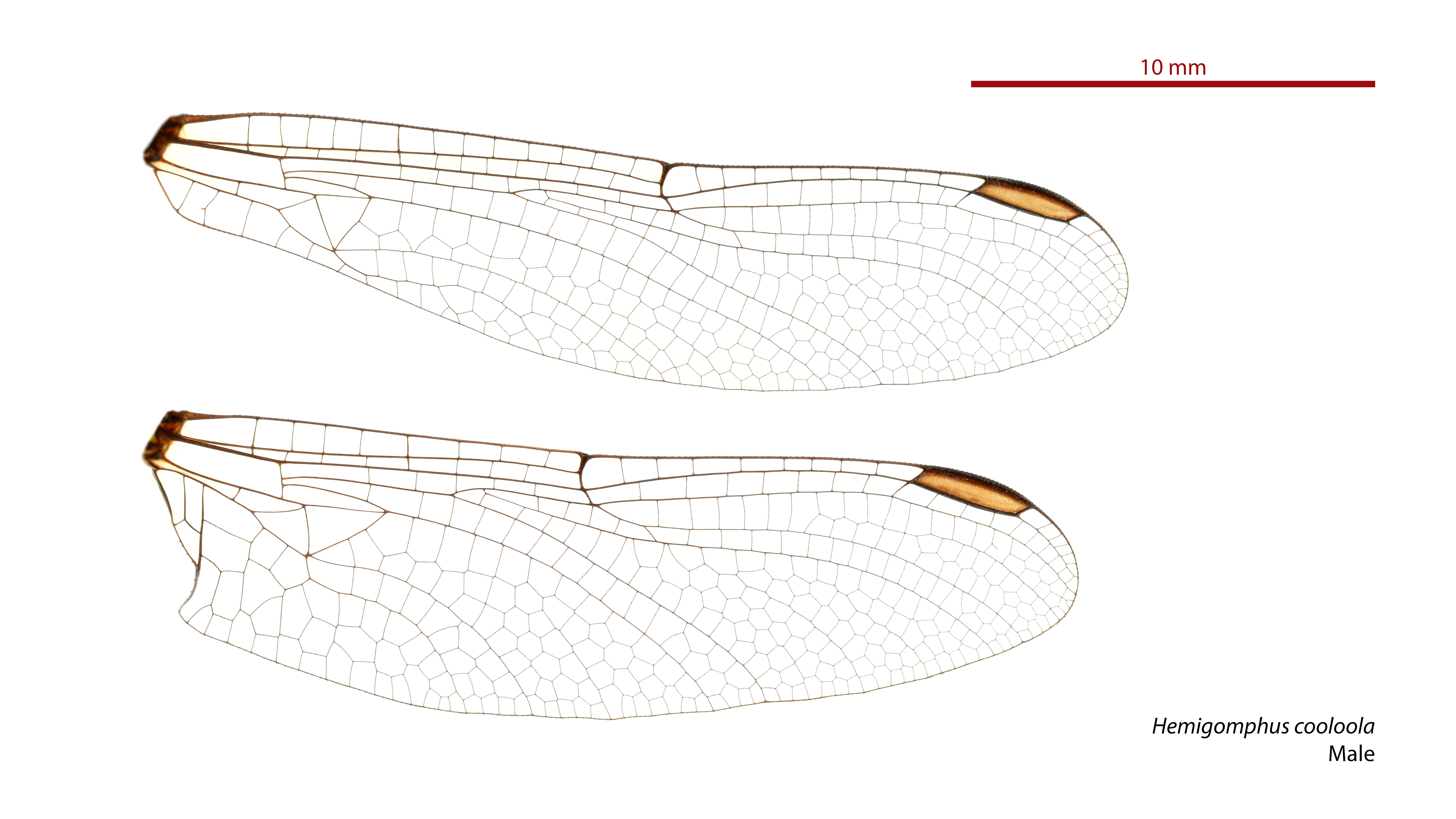
Male wings

== See also ==
- List of Odonata species of Australia
