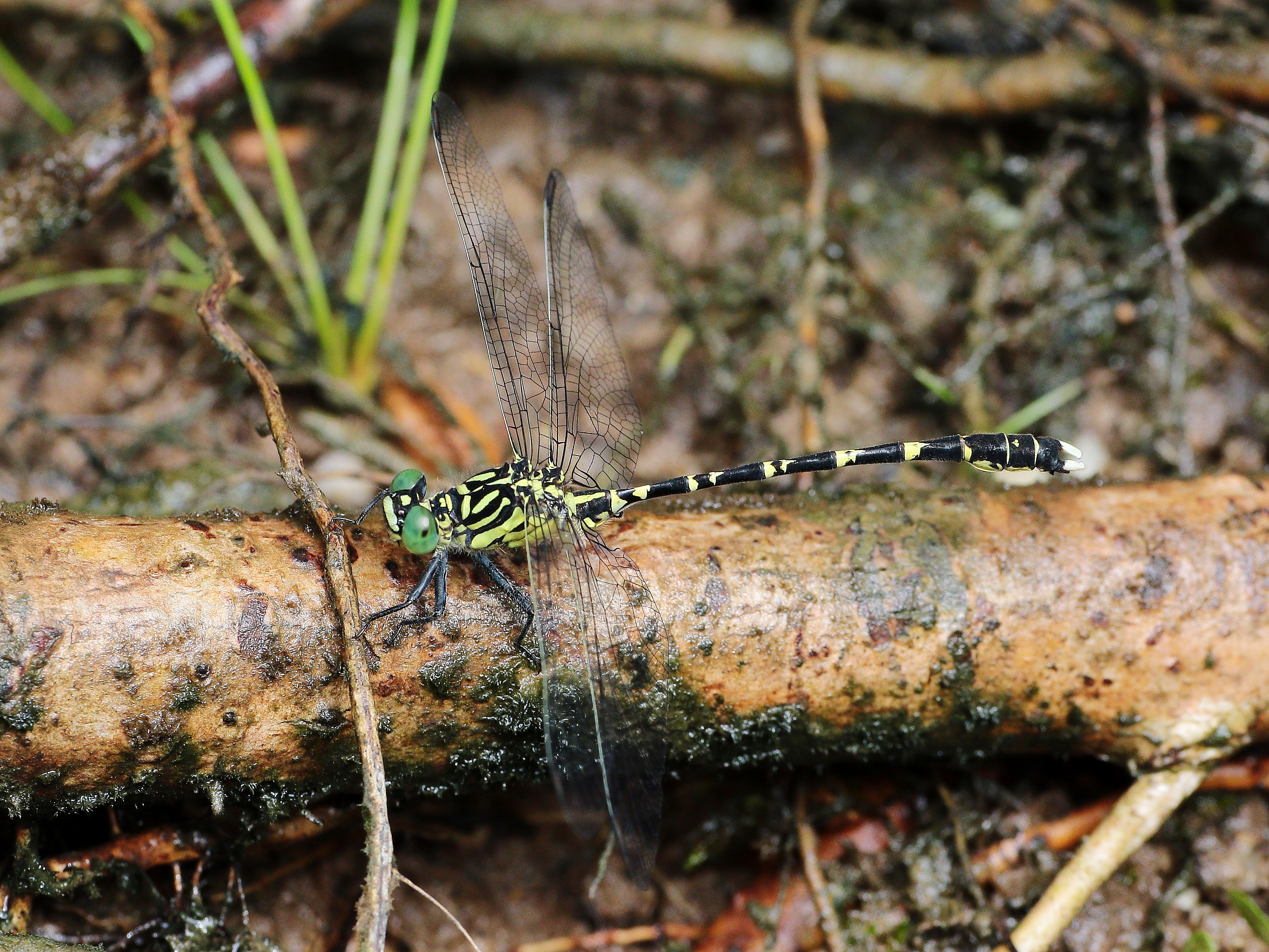
- Male, North Queensland, Australia

Conservation status
- Least Concern (IUCN 3.1)

Scientific classification
- Kingdom: Animalia
- Phylum: Arthropoda
- Clade: Pancrustacea
- Class: Insecta
- Order: Odonata
- Suborder: Anisoptera
- Family: Gomphidae
- Genus: Hemigomphus
- Species: H. comitatus

Binomial name
- Hemigomphus comitatus (Tillyard, 1909)

Synonyms
- Austrogomphus comitatus Tillyard, 1909

= Hemigomphus comitatus =

Zebra vicetail

Species of dragonfly

Hemigomphus comitatus is a species of dragonfly of the family Gomphidae, known as the zebra vicetail. It is endemic to northern Queensland, Australia, where it inhabits streams and rivers.

== Description ==
Hemigomphus comitatus is a small dragonfly with black and yellow markings. Its wingspan is 50-55mm and overall length is 40-45mm. The eyes of the adult are green and do not meet at the top of the head. The head of the female has a spine from the occiput just behind the eyes. The synthorax is strongly marked with black and yellow stripes, with the humeral stripe usually being continuous. A black mark along the suture of the synthorax is usually broken above and below the metastigma. The abdomen is black with prominent yellow bands, the appendages of the male are yellow and curve inwards at the tip. The wing margin at the base of the hindwing is folded in the male, but uniformly curved in the female.

== Distribution ==
Hemigomphus comitatus has been recorded from near Mackay, Queensland to northern regions of Cape York Peninsula, usually along the coastal strip and nearby mountain ranges.

== Habitat ==
Hemigomphus comitatus is known to inhabit streams and rivers, not necessarily in rainforest. The exemplar pictured here was found in suburban Cairns near a seasonal storm-water creek.

== Etymology ==
The genus name Hemigomphus is derived from the Greek ἡμι- (hēmi, "half"), combined with Gomphus, a genus name derived from the Greek γόμφος (gomphos, "peg" or "nail"), referring to the shape of the male abdomen. The name refers to the close relationship of the genus to Gomphus.

The species name comitatus is Latin for "retinue" or "a body of companions", possibly referring to its observed habit of flying with other dragonflies.

== Gallery ==
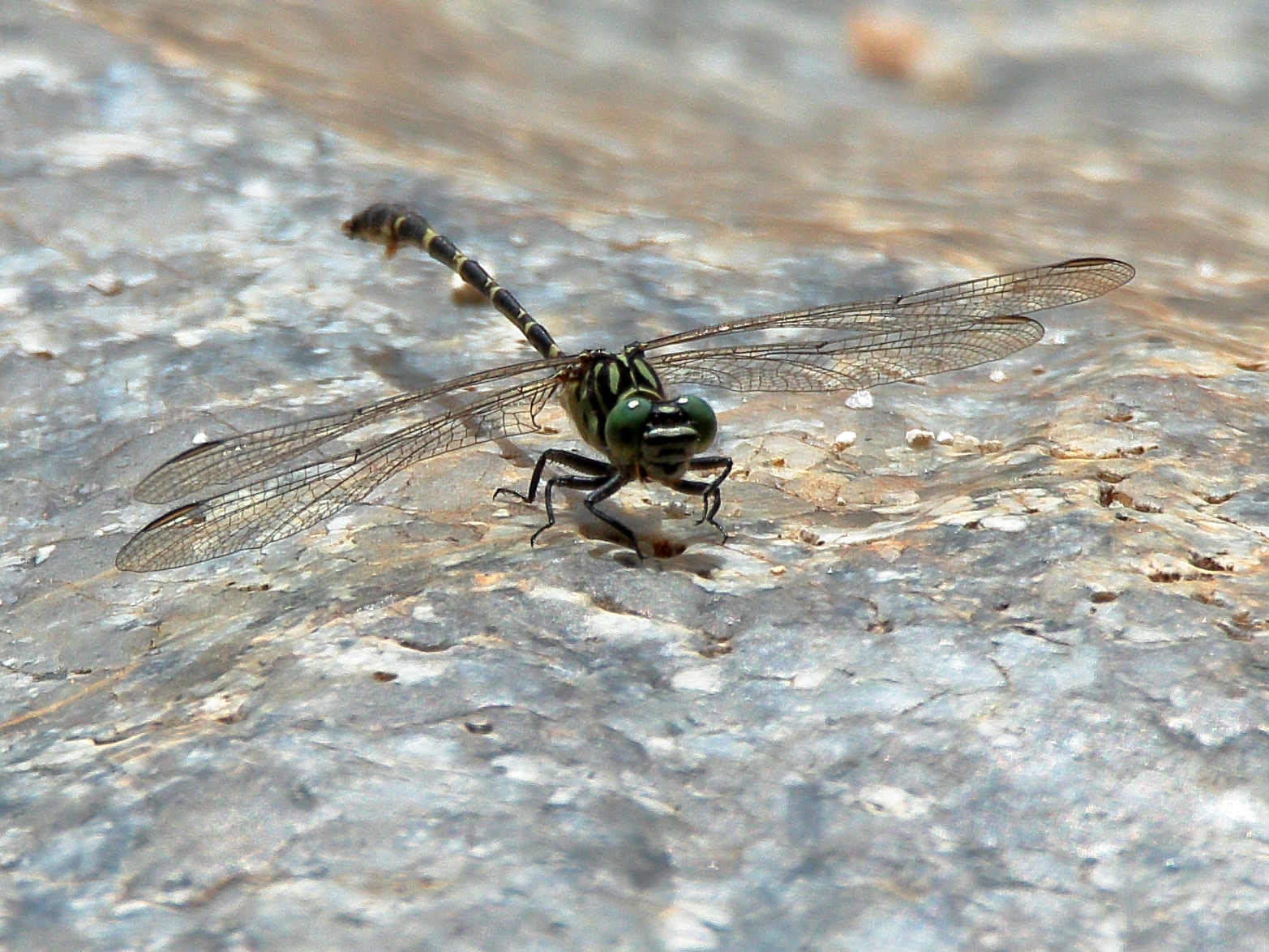
Male, front quarter

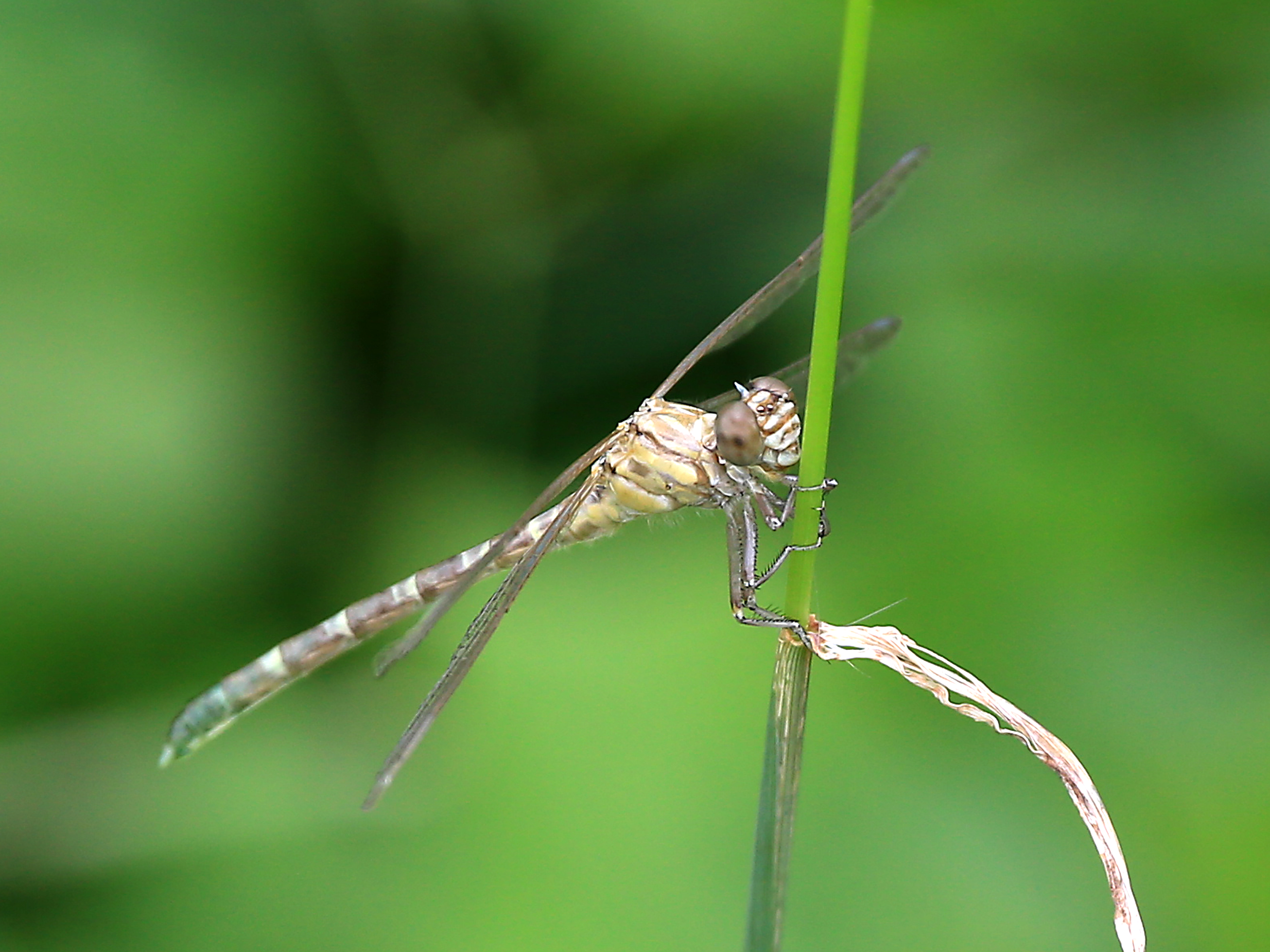
Front quarter of teneral female Hemigomphus comitatus

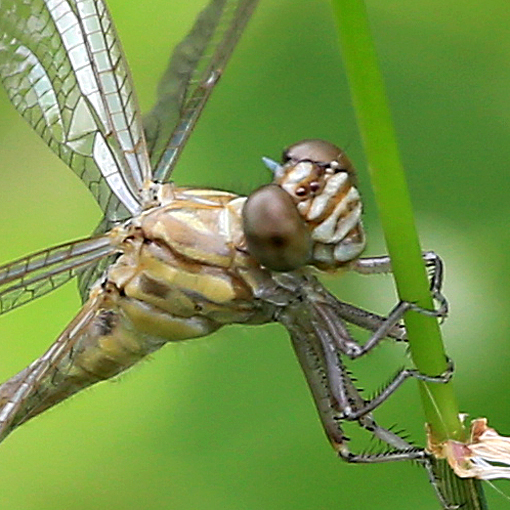
Closeup of head showing patterns on the synthorax and spine on the head.

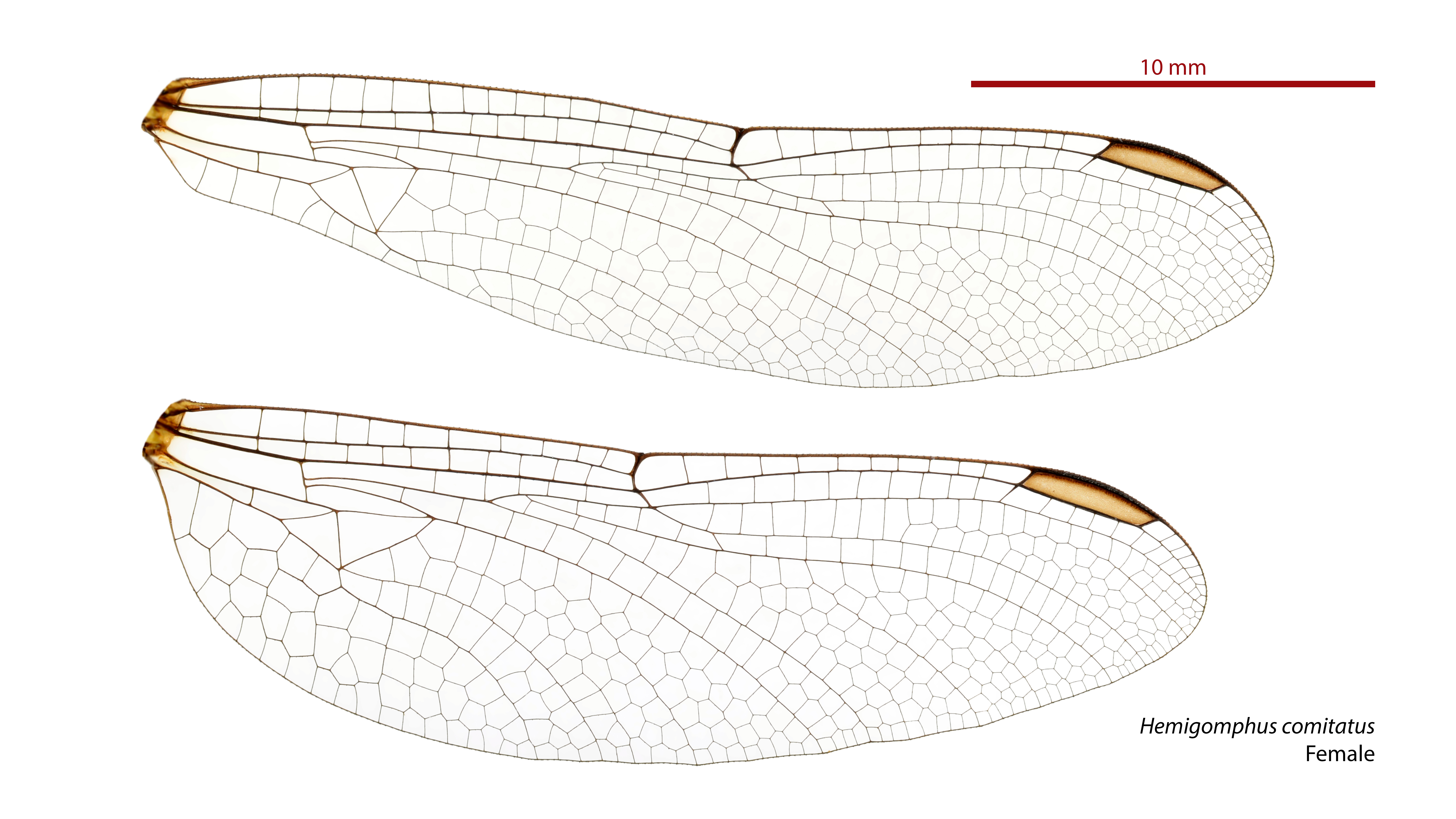
Female wings

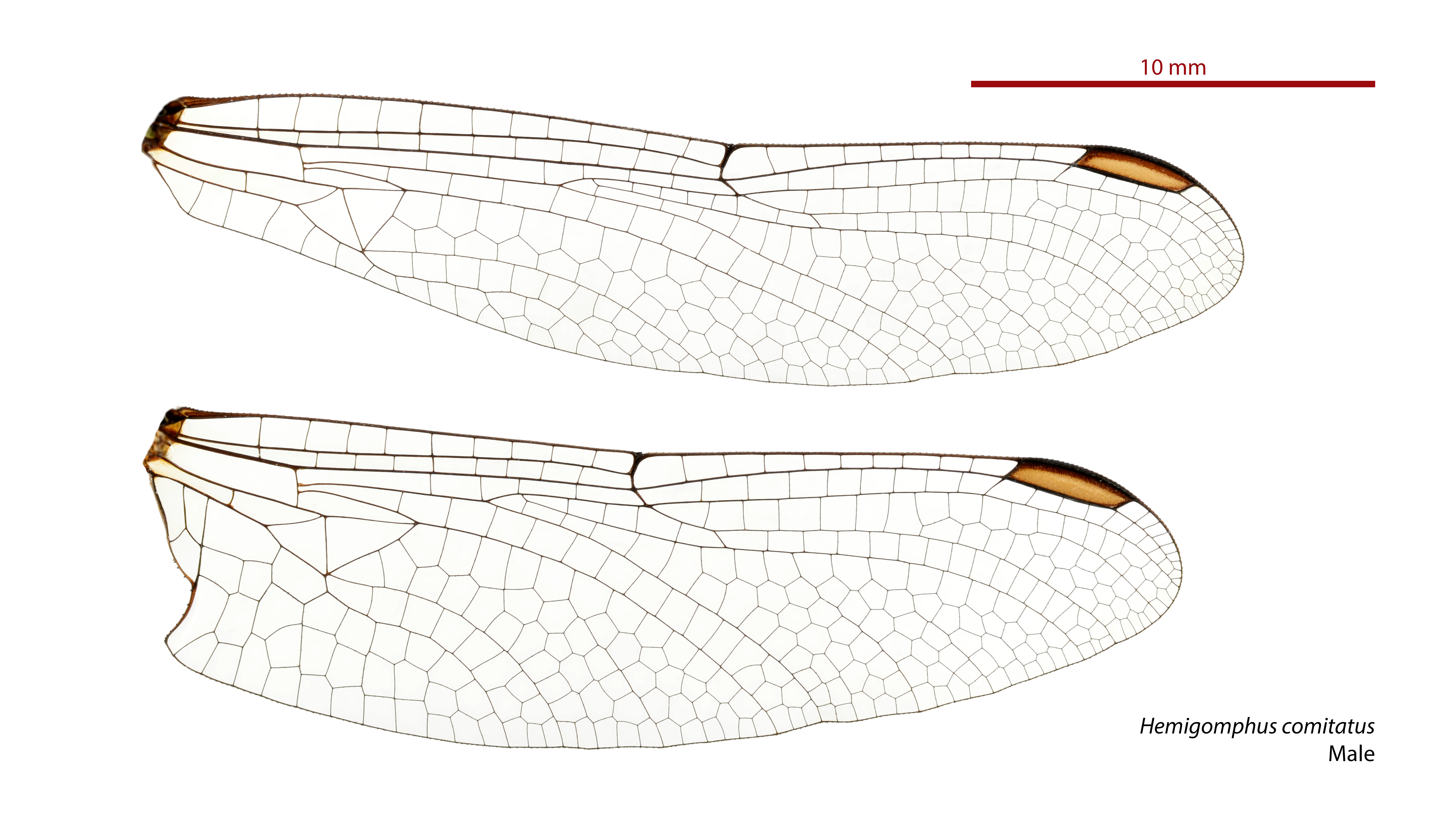
Male wings

== See also ==
- List of Odonata species of Australia
