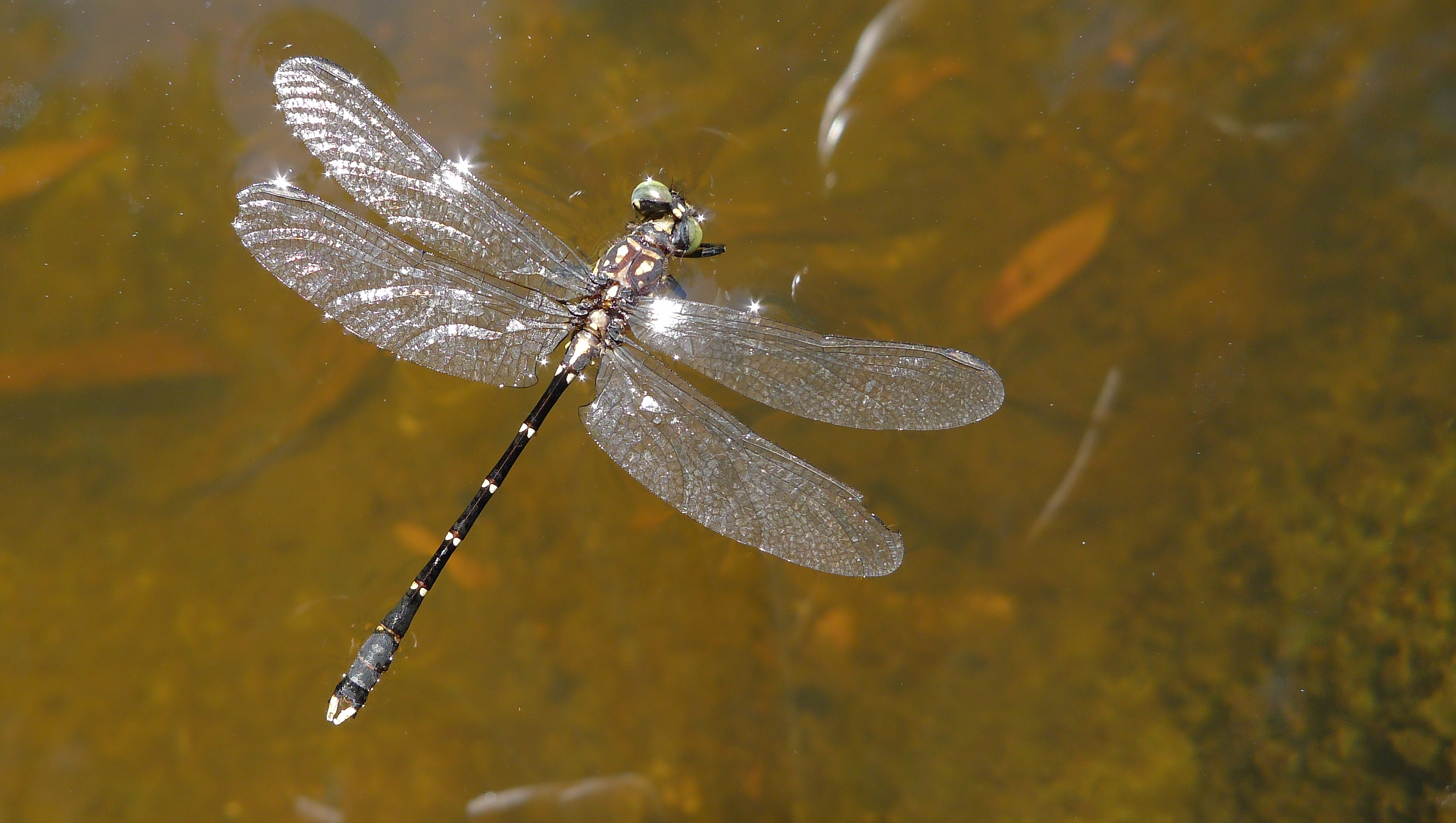
- Male Hemigomphus gouldii

Scientific classification
- Kingdom: Animalia
- Phylum: Arthropoda
- Clade: Pancrustacea
- Class: Insecta
- Order: Odonata
- Suborder: Anisoptera
- Family: Gomphidae
- Genus: Hemigomphus; Selys, 1854

= Hemigomphus =

Genus of dragonflies

Hemigomphus is a genus of dragonflies in the family Gomphidae, endemic to Australia. The species are small with black and yellow markings. They are commonly known as vicetails.

== Species ==
The genus Hemigomphus includes the following species:

- Hemigomphus atratus Watson, 1991 - black vicetail
- Hemigomphus comitatus (Tillyard, 1909) - zebra vicetail
- Hemigomphus cooloola Watson, 1969 - Wallum vicetail
- Hemigomphus gouldii (Selys, 1854) - southern vicetail
- Hemigomphus heteroclytus Selys, 1854 - stout vicetail
- Hemigomphus magela Watson, 1991 - Kakadu vicetail
- Hemigomphus theischingeri Watson, 1991 - rainforest vicetail

== Etymology ==
The genus name Hemigomphus is derived from the Greek ἡμι- (hēmi, "half"), combined with Gomphus, a genus name derived from the Greek γόμφος (gomphos, "peg" or "nail"), referring to the shape of the male abdomen. The name refers to the close relationship of the genus to Gomphus.

== See also ==
- List of Odonata species of Australia
