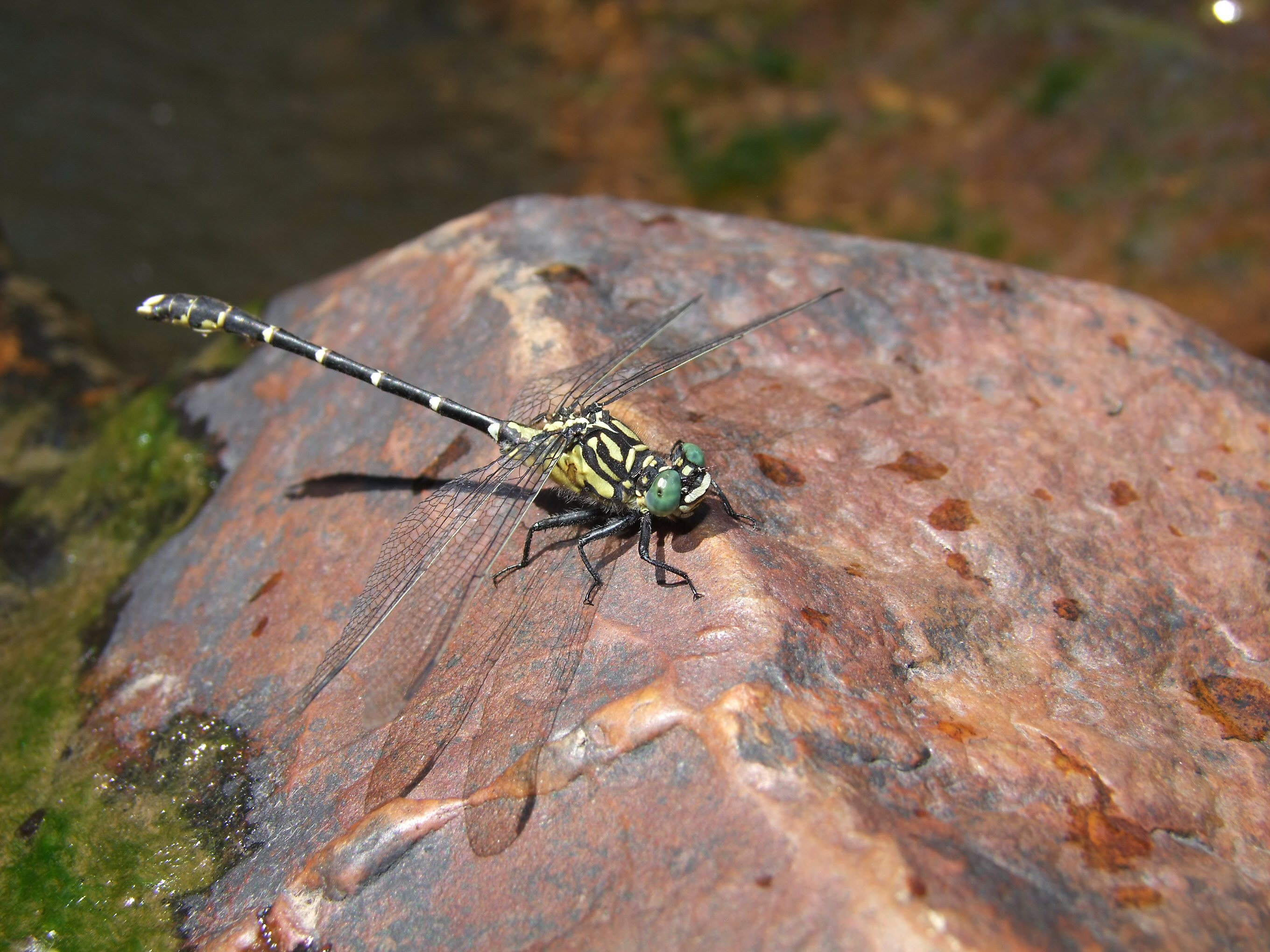
- Male Hemigomphus gouldii

Conservation status
- Least Concern (IUCN 3.1)

Scientific classification
- Kingdom: Animalia
- Phylum: Arthropoda
- Clade: Pancrustacea
- Class: Insecta
- Order: Odonata
- Suborder: Anisoptera
- Family: Gomphidae
- Genus: Hemigomphus
- Species: H. gouldii

Binomial name
- Hemigomphus gouldii (Selys, 1854)

Synonyms
- Austrogomphus gouldii Selys, 1854

= Hemigomphus gouldii =

Southern vicetail

Species of dragonfly

Hemigomphus gouldii is a species of dragonfly of the family Gomphidae, known as the southern vicetail. It is a small, black and yellow dragonfly, endemic to eastern Australia, where it inhabits permanent streams and rivers.

== Etymology ==
The genus name Hemigomphus is derived from the Greek ἡμι- (hēmi, "half"), combined with Gomphus, a genus name derived from the Greek γόμφος (gomphos, "peg" or "nail"), referring to the shape of the male abdomen. The name refers to the close relationship of the genus to Gomphus.

In 1854, Selys named this species gouldii, an eponym honouring John Gould (1804–1881), an ornithologist who collected the original specimen during his visit to Australia between 1838 and 1840.

== Gallery ==
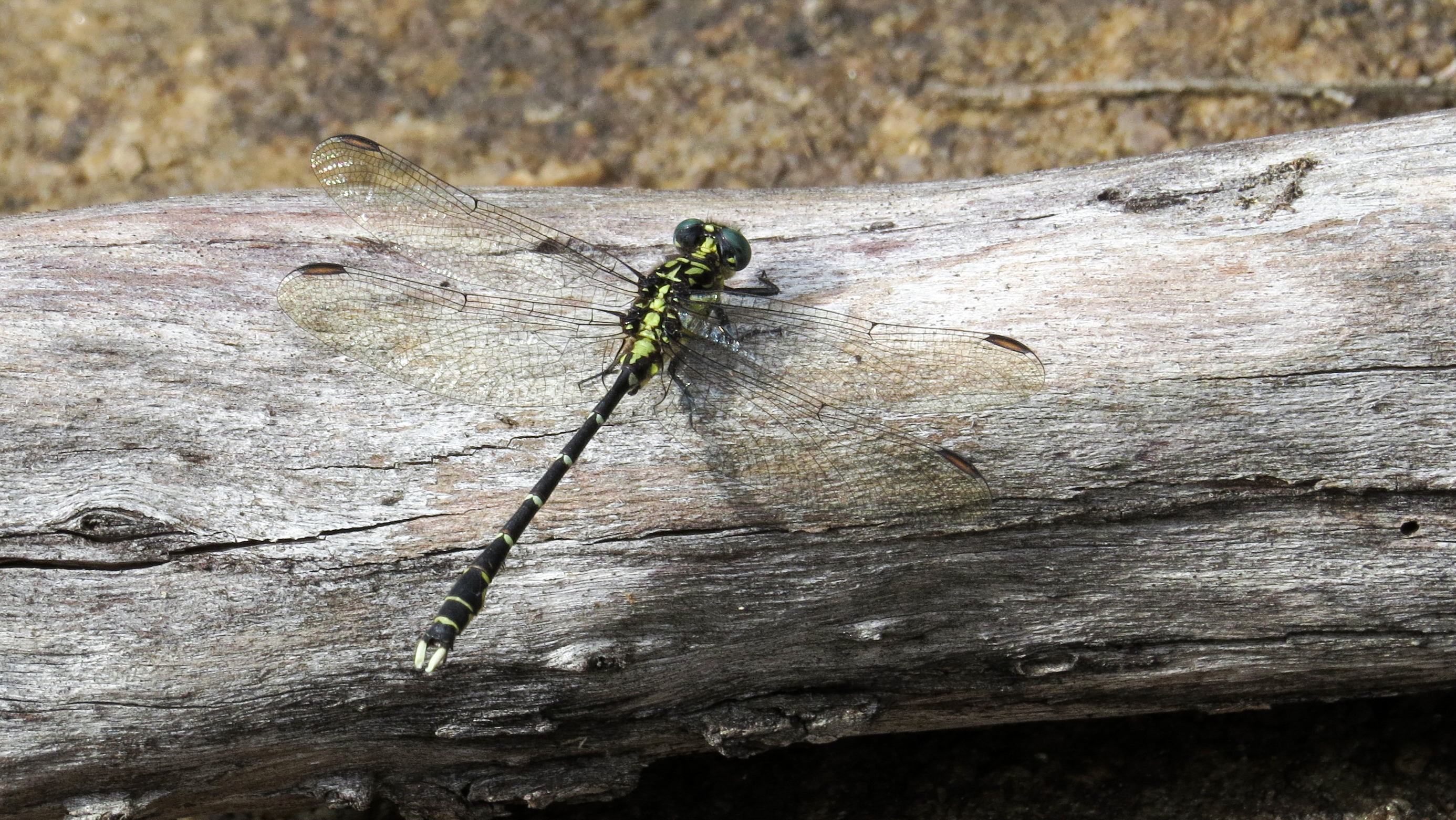
Male

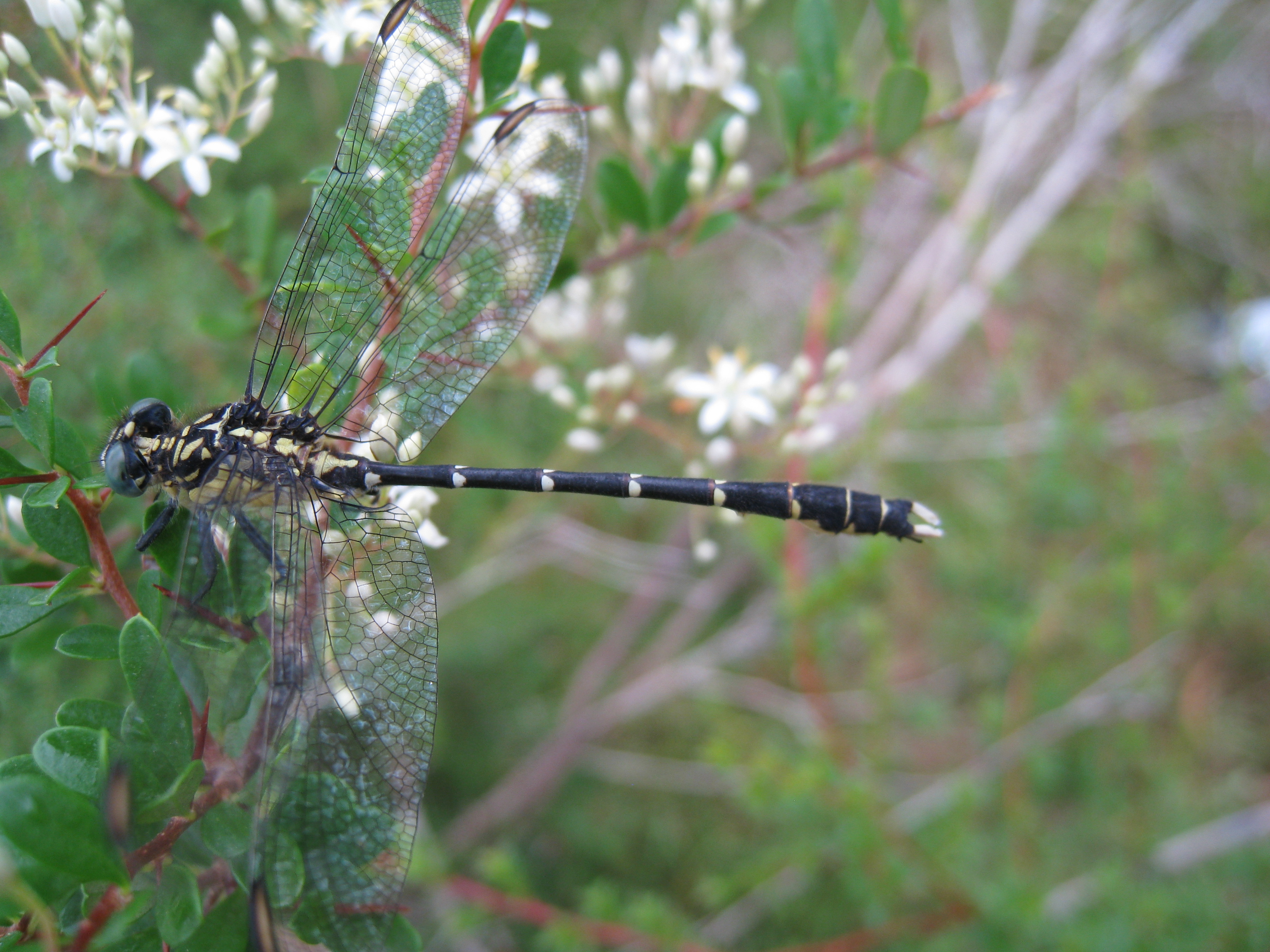
Male showing vice tail

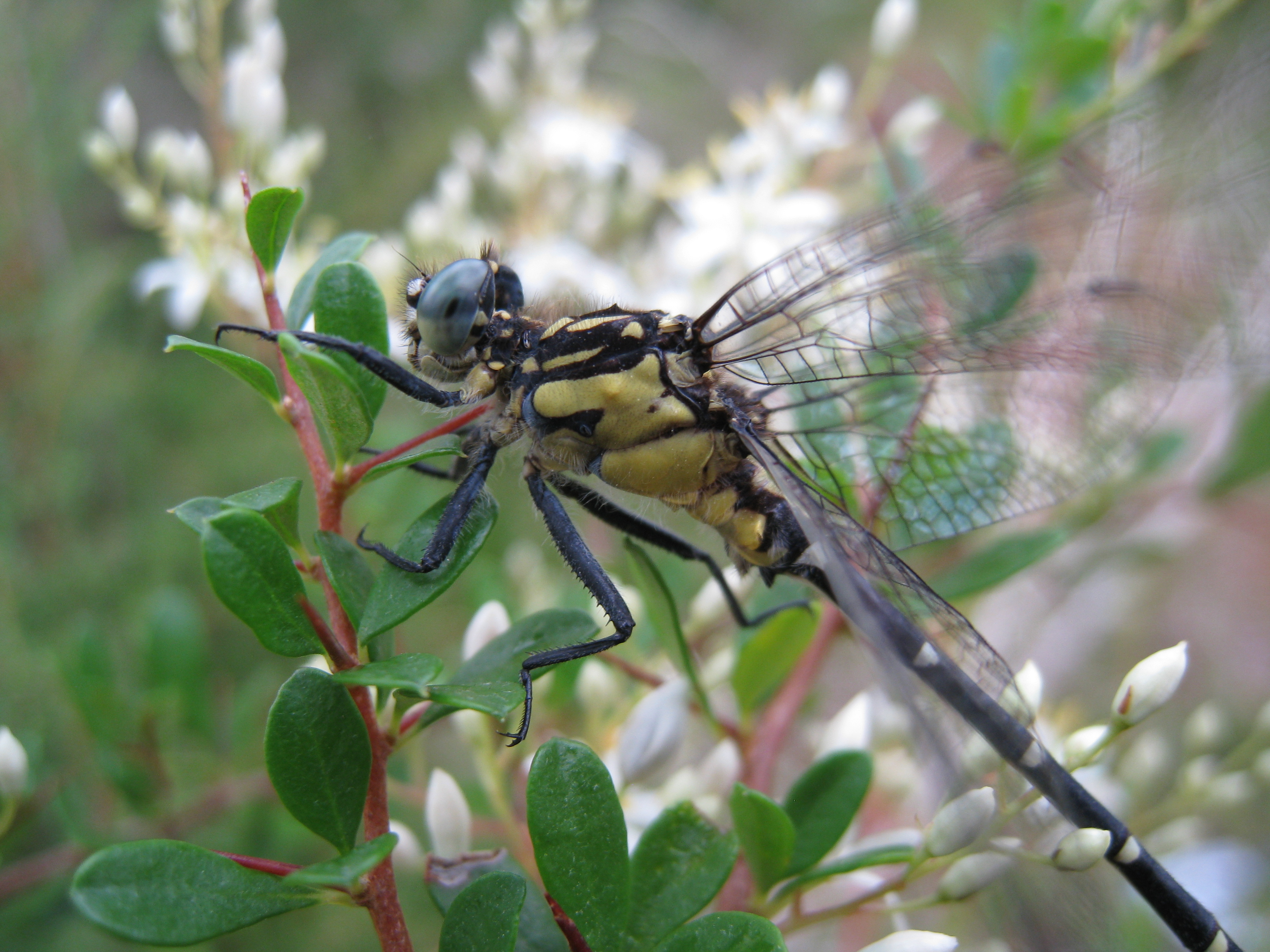
Male side view

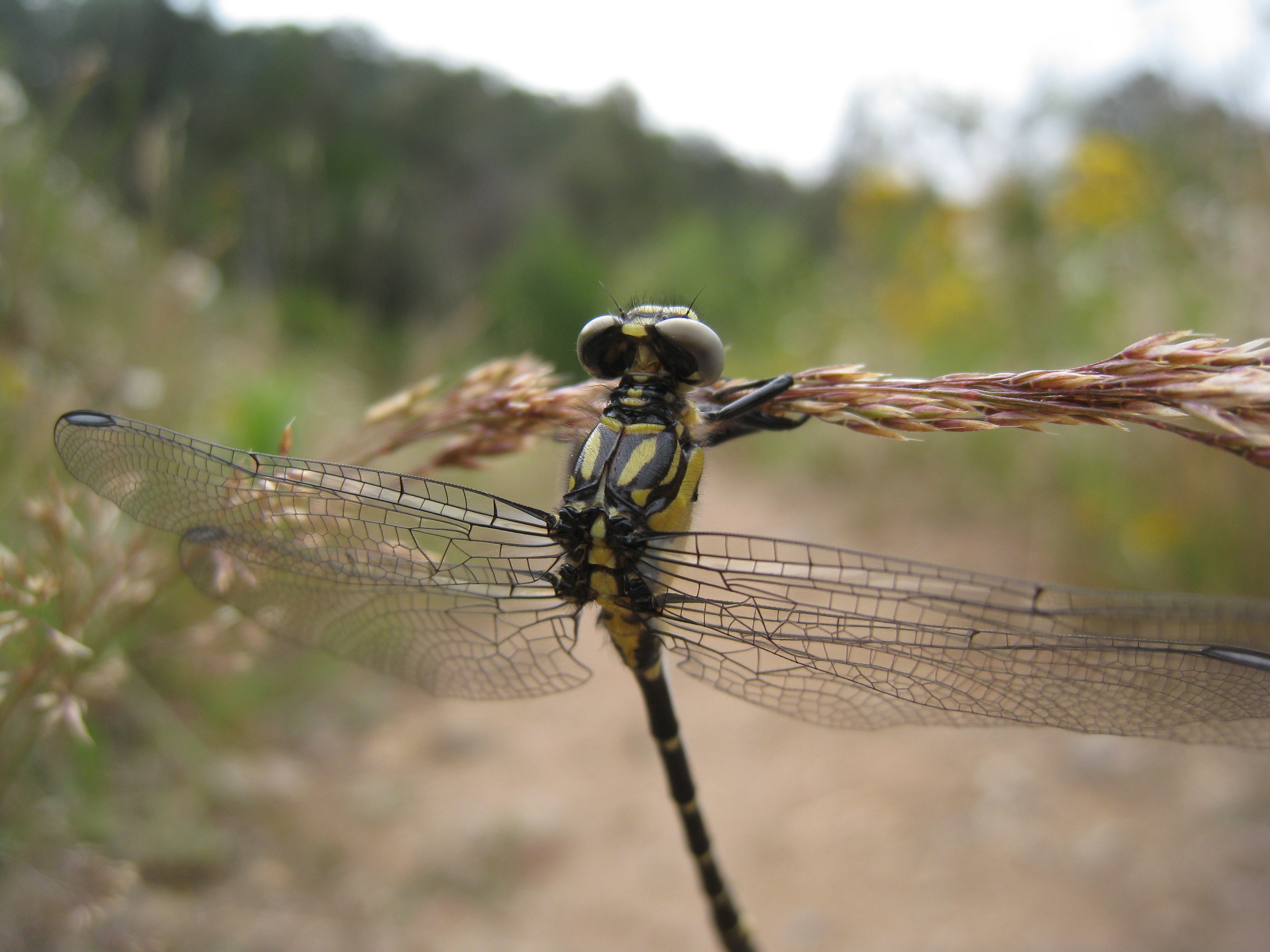
Clinging on to a blade of grass

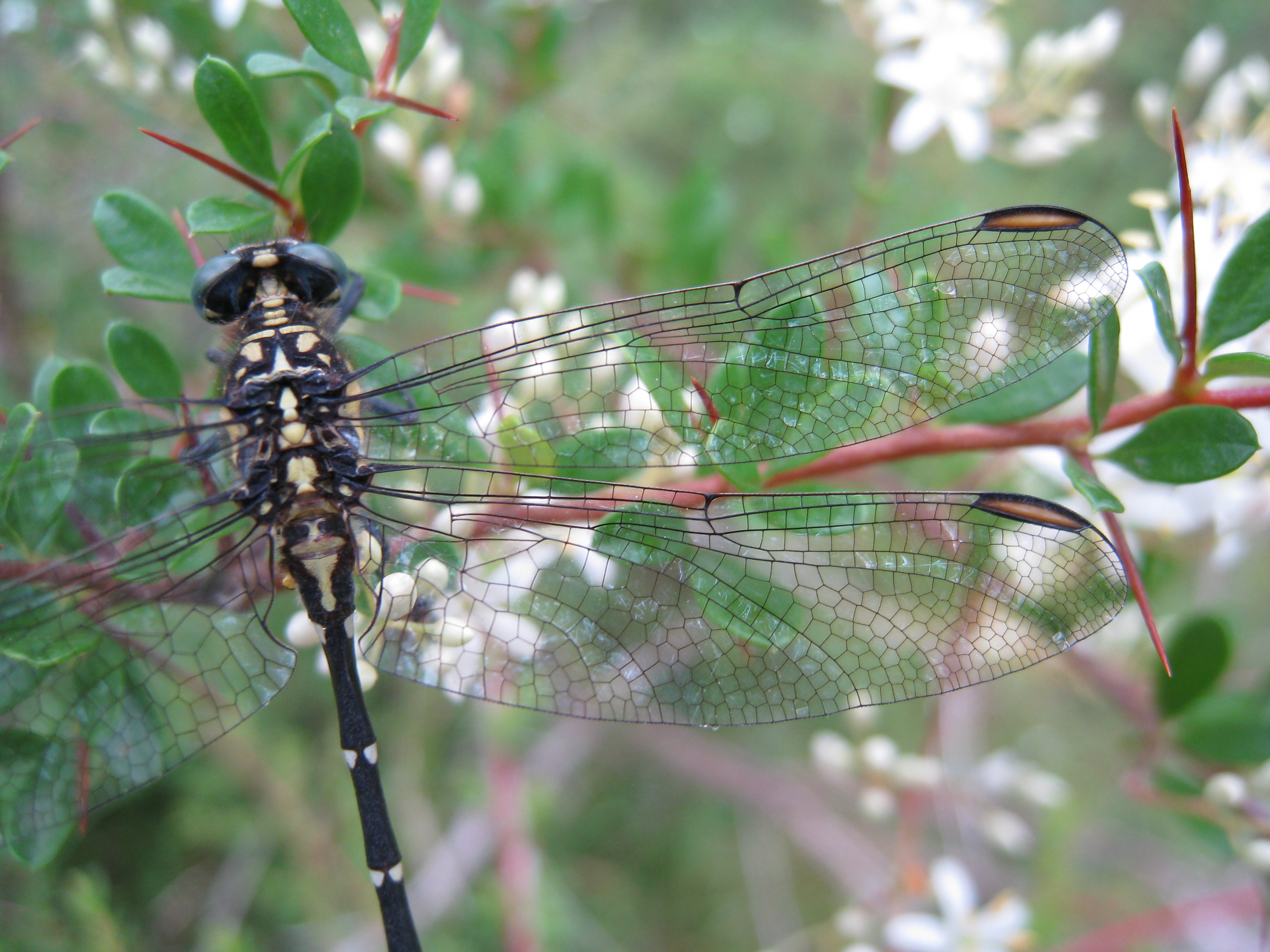
Male showing wing venation

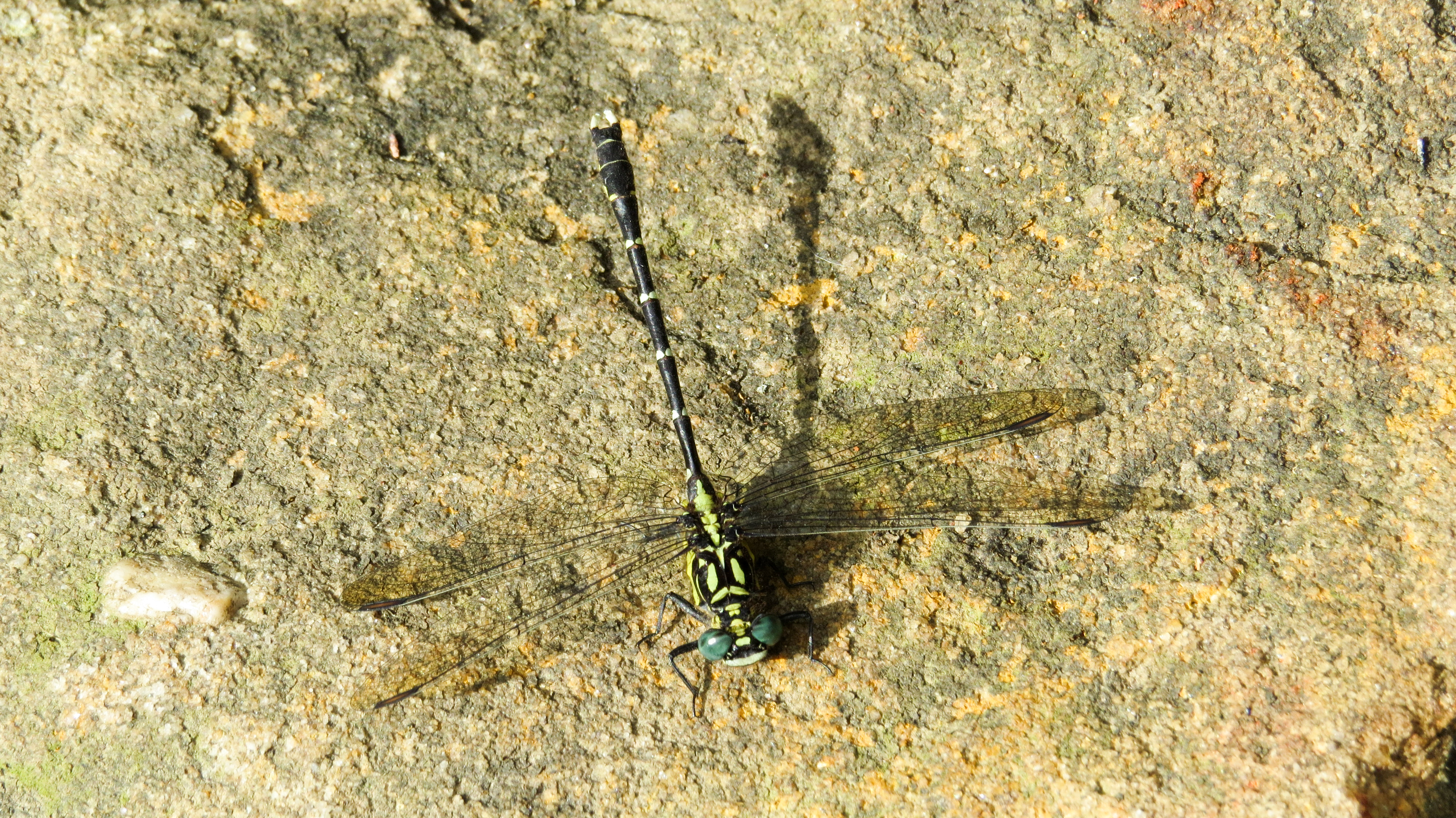
Male from above

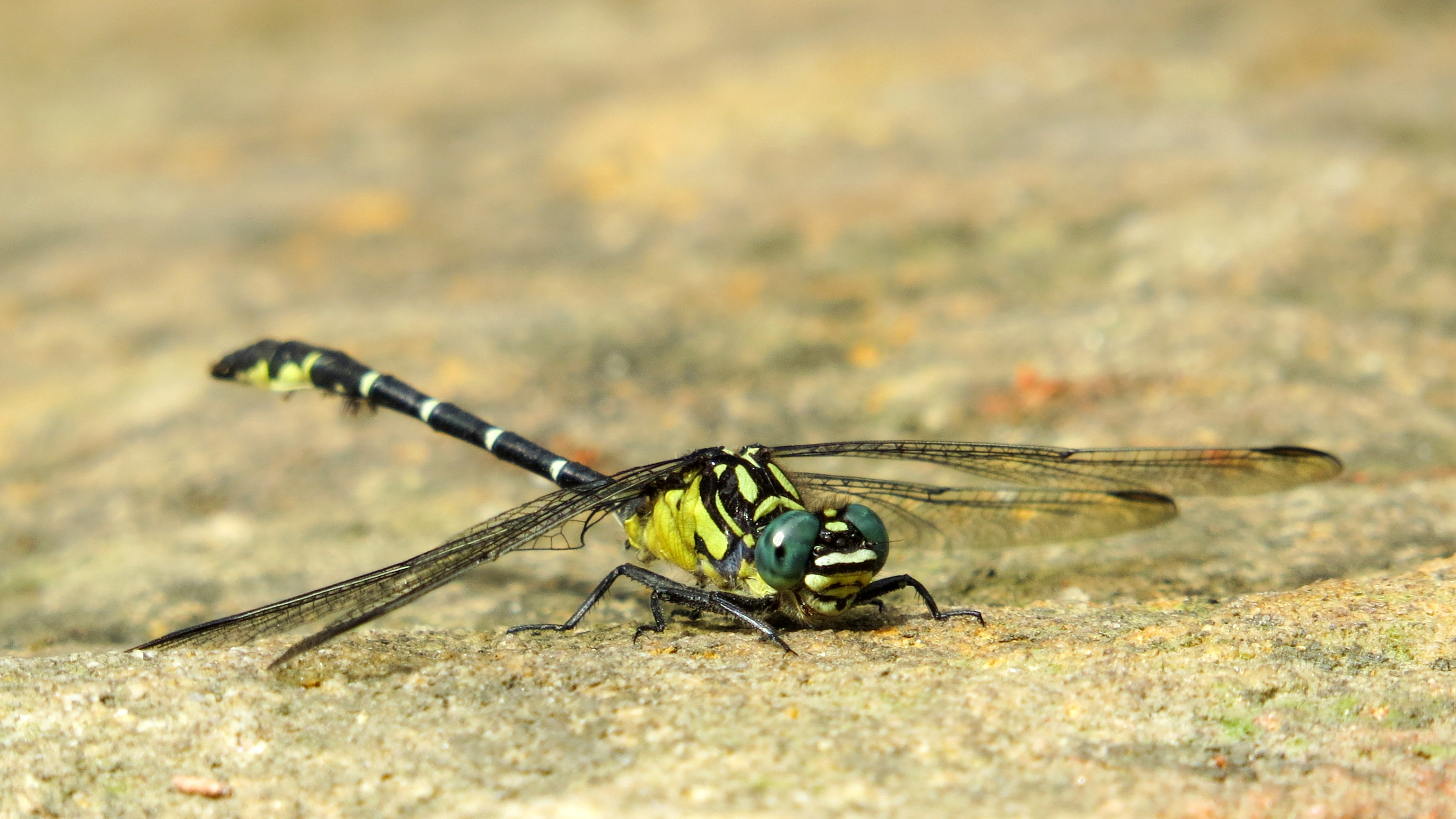
Male from in front

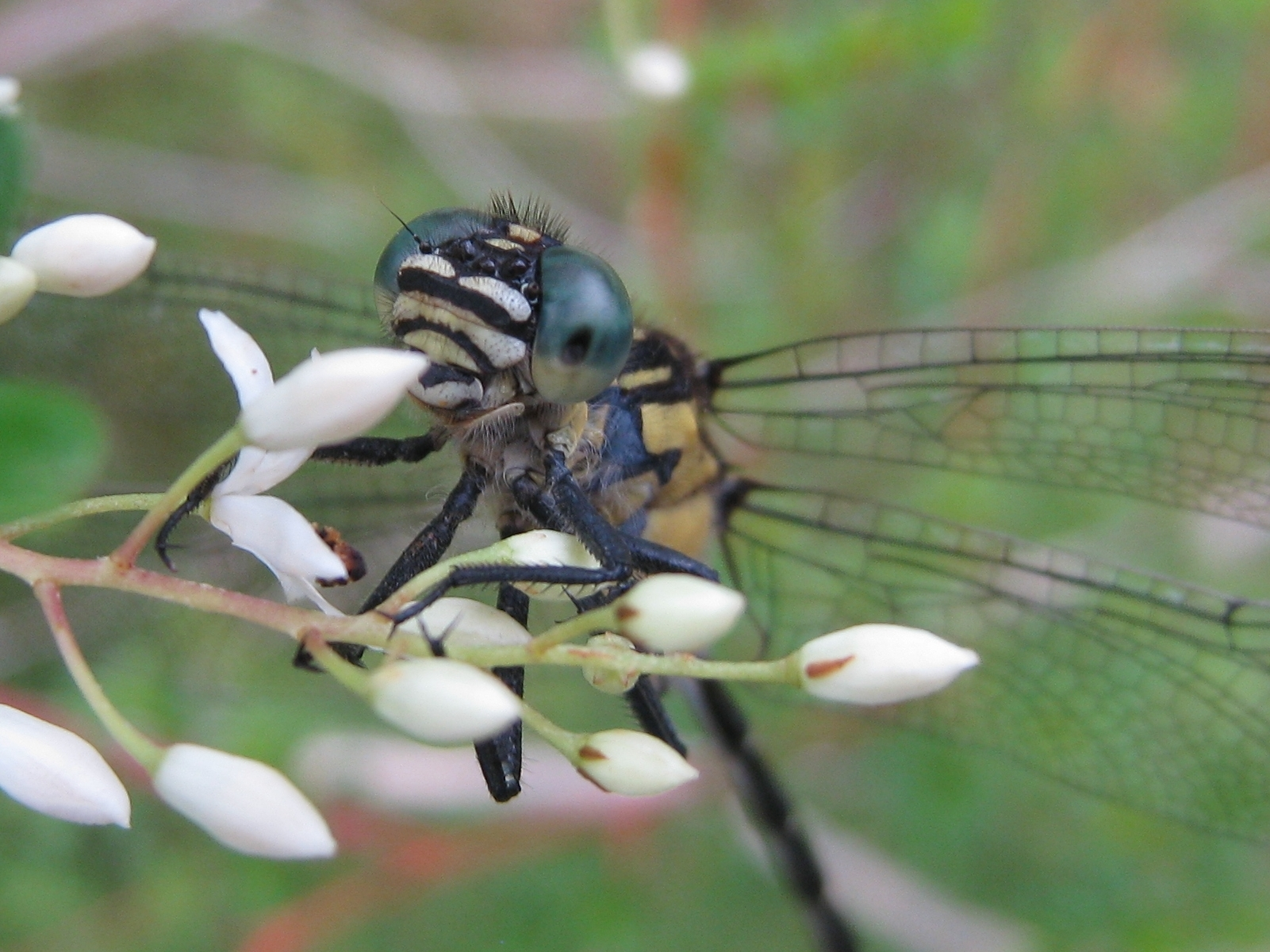
Face on

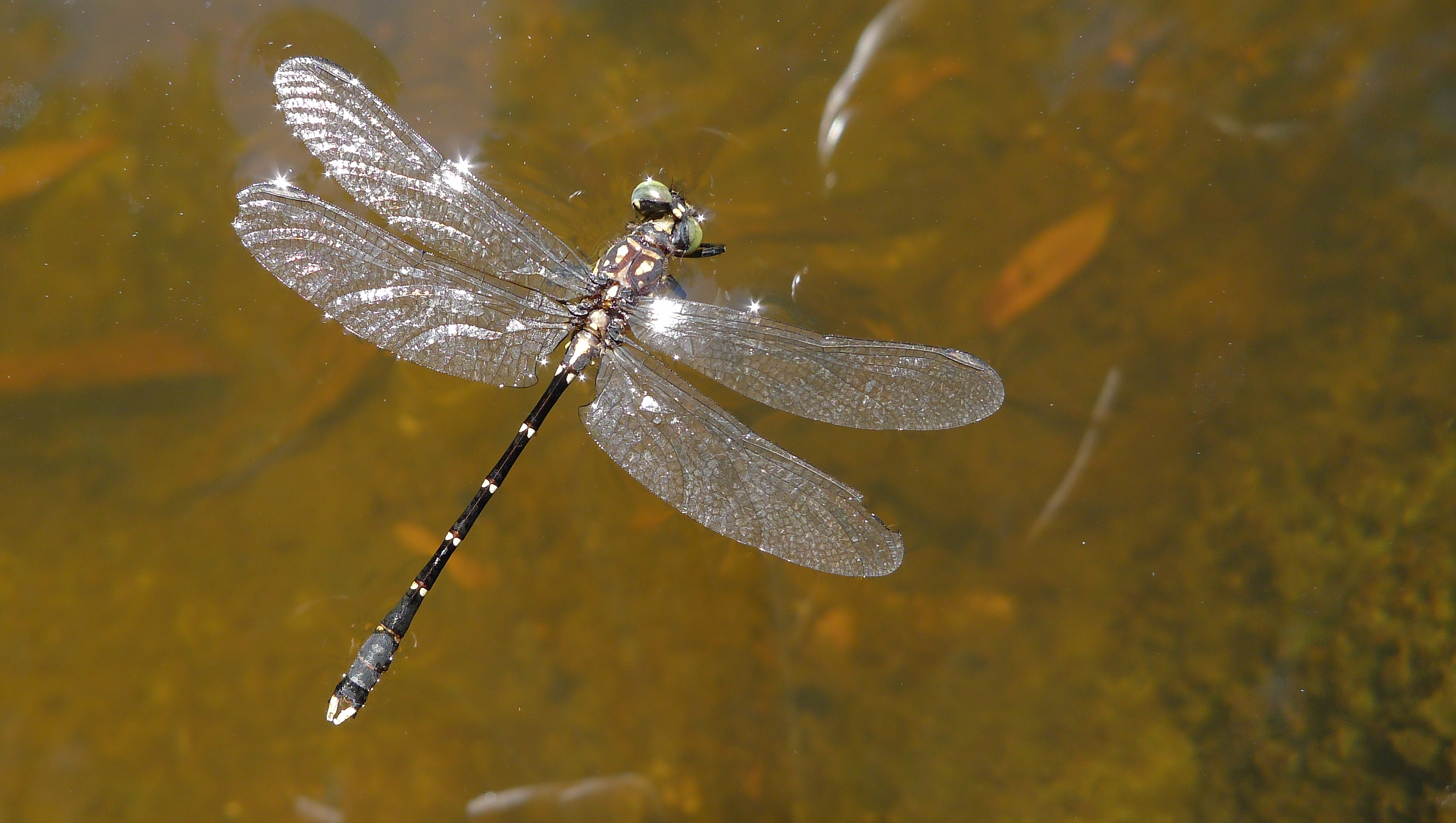
Face down

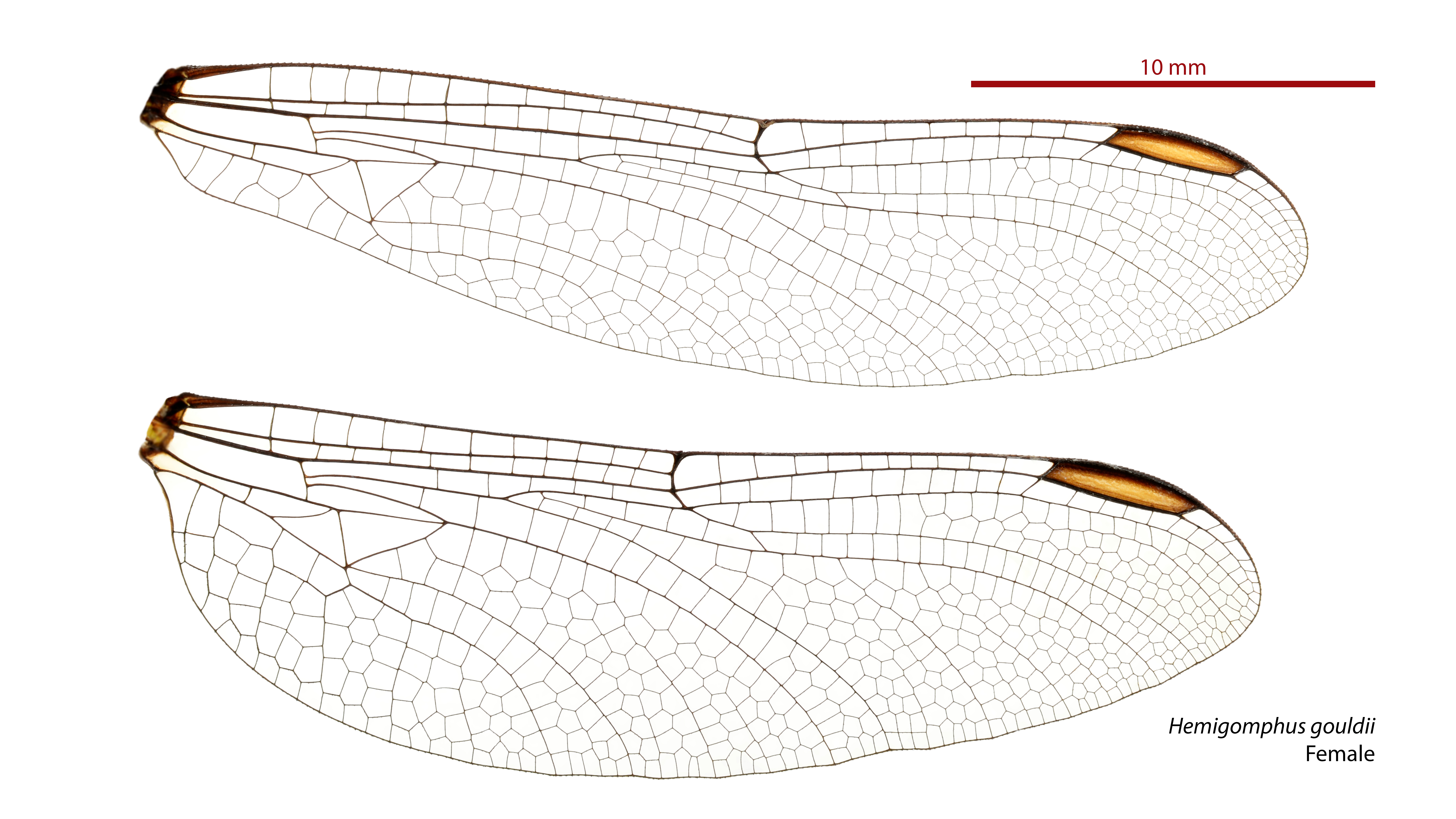
Female wings

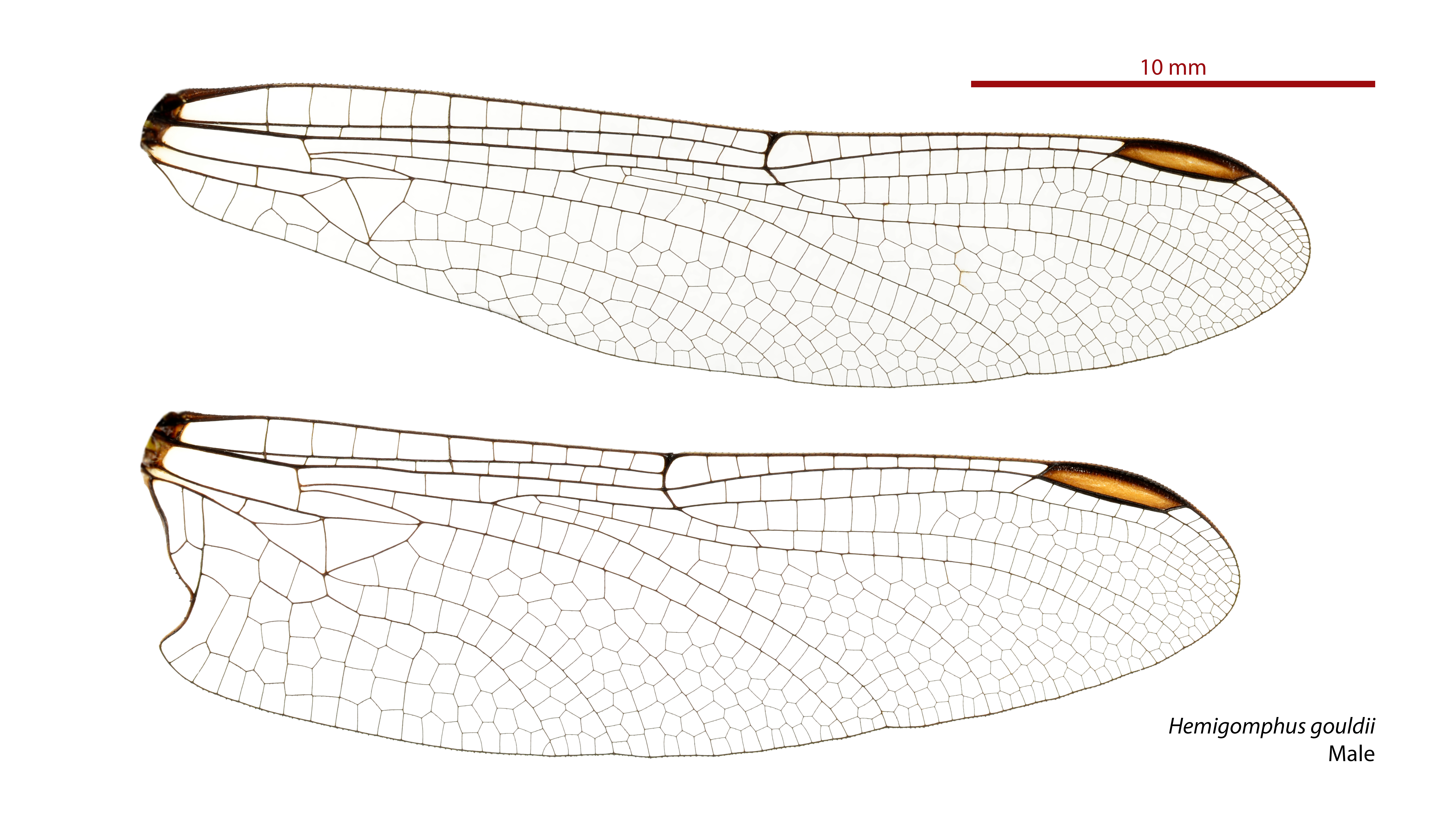
Male wings

== See also ==
- List of Odonata species of Australia
