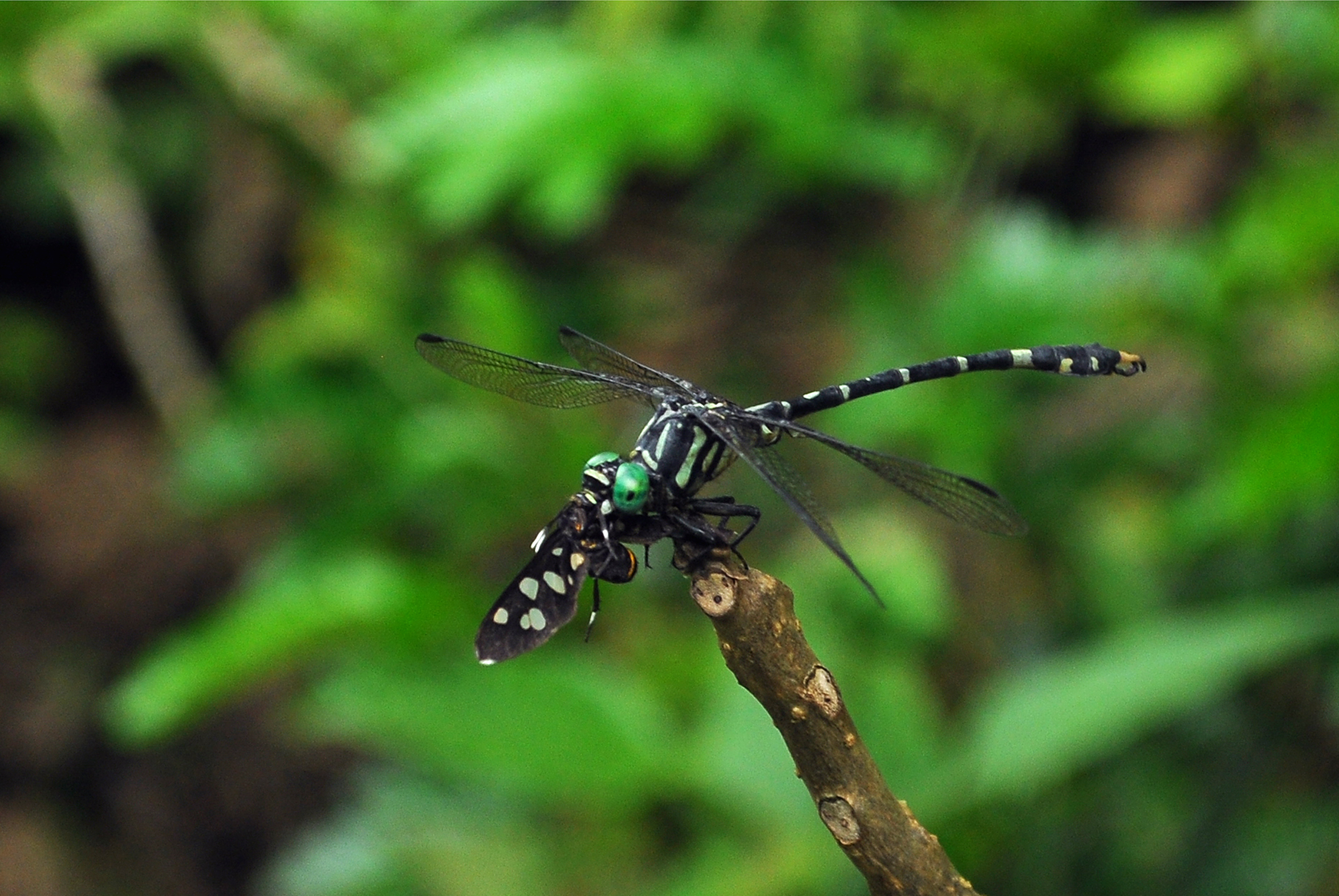
- From Konni, Kerala

Conservation status
- Data Deficient (IUCN 3.1)

Scientific classification
- Kingdom: Animalia
- Phylum: Arthropoda
- Class: Insecta
- Order: Odonata
- Infraorder: Anisoptera
- Family: Gomphidae
- Genus: Nychogomphus
- Species: N. striatus

Binomial name
- Nychogomphus striatus (Fraser, 1924)

Synonyms
- Onychogomphus striatus Fraser, 1924

= Nychogomphus striatus =

Species of dragonfly

Nychogomphus striatus is a species of dragonfly in the family Gomphidae. It is endemic to the streams of Western Ghats of India. Reports from Nepal require further studies.

== Taxonomy ==
Nychogomphus was established as subgenus of Onychogomphus by Carle (1986) with N. geometricus as the type based on the shape of the male cerci and the secondary genitalia. Chao (1990), in his revision of Chinese gomphids elevated this taxon to genus level and transferred Onychogomphus duaricus and O. striatus to Nychogomphus.

== Description and habitat ==
It is a medium-sized dragonfly with bottle-green eyes. Its thorax is black on dorsum, marked with yellow. There is a mesothoracic collar, oblique antehumeral stripes joined to the mesothoracic collar, and complete humeral stripes. Laterally yellow, with two black lines mapping out the sutures. The humeral stripes tapering to a point below, and black lines on lateral sutures rather thicker. Segment 1 of the abdomen is black, with a large lateral yellow spot. Segment 2 has a narrow basal black ring and broad sub-basal black stripes. Segments 3 to 6 have yellow basal rings and median dorsal spots. Segment 7 has its basal half yellow. Segment 8 and 9 are black, with a large yellow spot on each side. Segment 10 is entirely black. Superior anal appendages are yellow, the inferior is dark. Superiors have a fine black line along the upper surface of the apical third.

No information available on the habitat or ecology of this species, but it is likely to breed in rocky forest streams as other species in this genus.

== See also ==
- List of odonates of India
- List of odonata of Kerala
