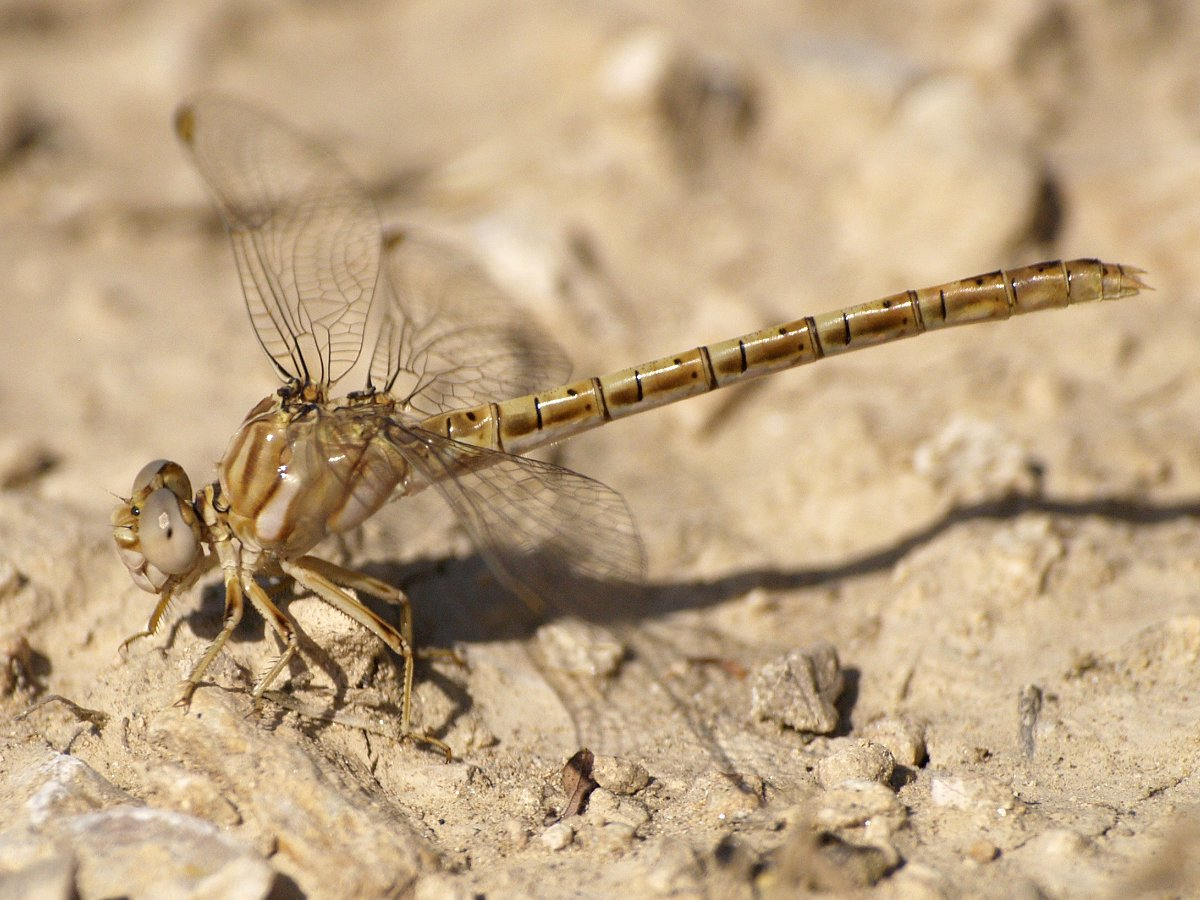

Conservation status
- Near Threatened (IUCN 3.1)

Scientific classification
- Kingdom: Animalia
- Phylum: Arthropoda
- Class: Insecta
- Order: Odonata
- Infraorder: Anisoptera
- Family: Gomphidae
- Genus: Onychogomphus
- Species: O. costae

Binomial name
- Onychogomphus costae Selys, 1885

= Onychogomphus costae =

Species of dragonfly

Onychogomphus costae is a species of dragonfly in the family Gomphidae. It is found in Algeria, Morocco, Portugal, Spain, and Tunisia. Its natural habitat is rivers. It is threatened by habitat loss.
