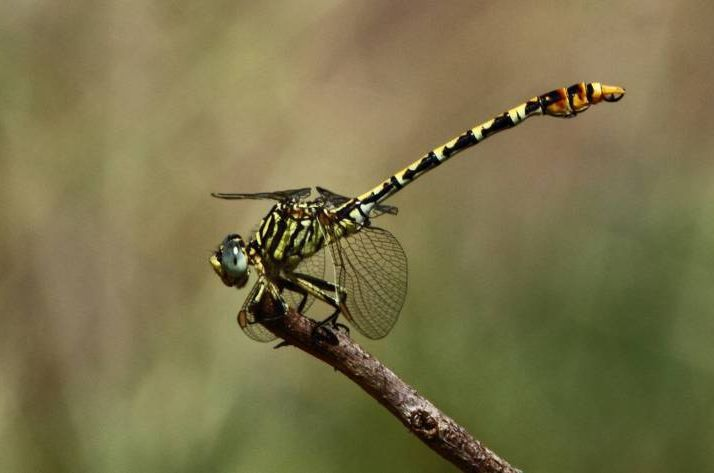

Conservation status
- Least Concern (IUCN 3.1)

Scientific classification
- Kingdom: Animalia
- Phylum: Arthropoda
- Class: Insecta
- Order: Odonata
- Infraorder: Anisoptera
- Family: Gomphidae
- Genus: Onychogomphus
- Species: O. supinus

Binomial name
- Onychogomphus supinus Hagen in Selys, 1854

= Onychogomphus supinus =

Species of dragonfly

Onychogomphus supinus is a species of dragonfly in the family Gomphidae. English names include lined claspertail and gorge claspertail.

== Distribution and status ==
This species may be restricted to southern Africa (Eswatini, Mozambique, South Africa and Zimbabwe). Records from elsewhere in Africa (Malawi, Tanzania, Kenya, Uganda, Burundi, Guinea, Sierra Leone and Senegal) are doubtful, due to taxonomic uncertainty. The form found in Senegal has been described as Onychogomphus supinus xerophilus.

The species is widespread, and has been assessed as Least Concern in southern Africa and as Data Deficient in West Africa.

== Habitat ==
Onychogomphus supinus is found in and near streams and rivers in bush or woodland.

== Identification ==
In South Africa, Zimbabwe and Mozambique, the shapes of the claspers are diagnostic, as are the patterns on the thorax and abdomen. Taxonomy and identification of similar species further north is uncertain.

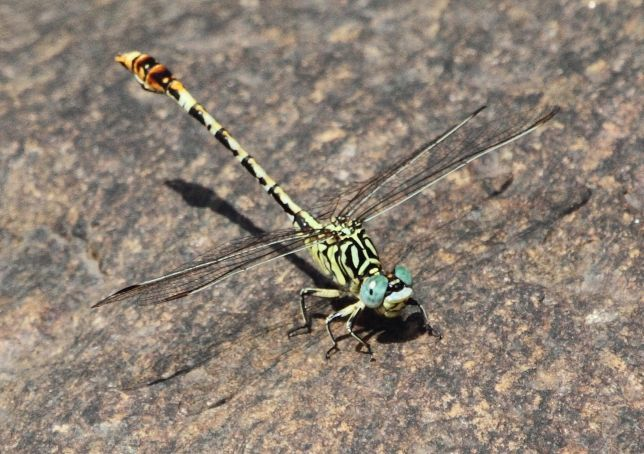
Male

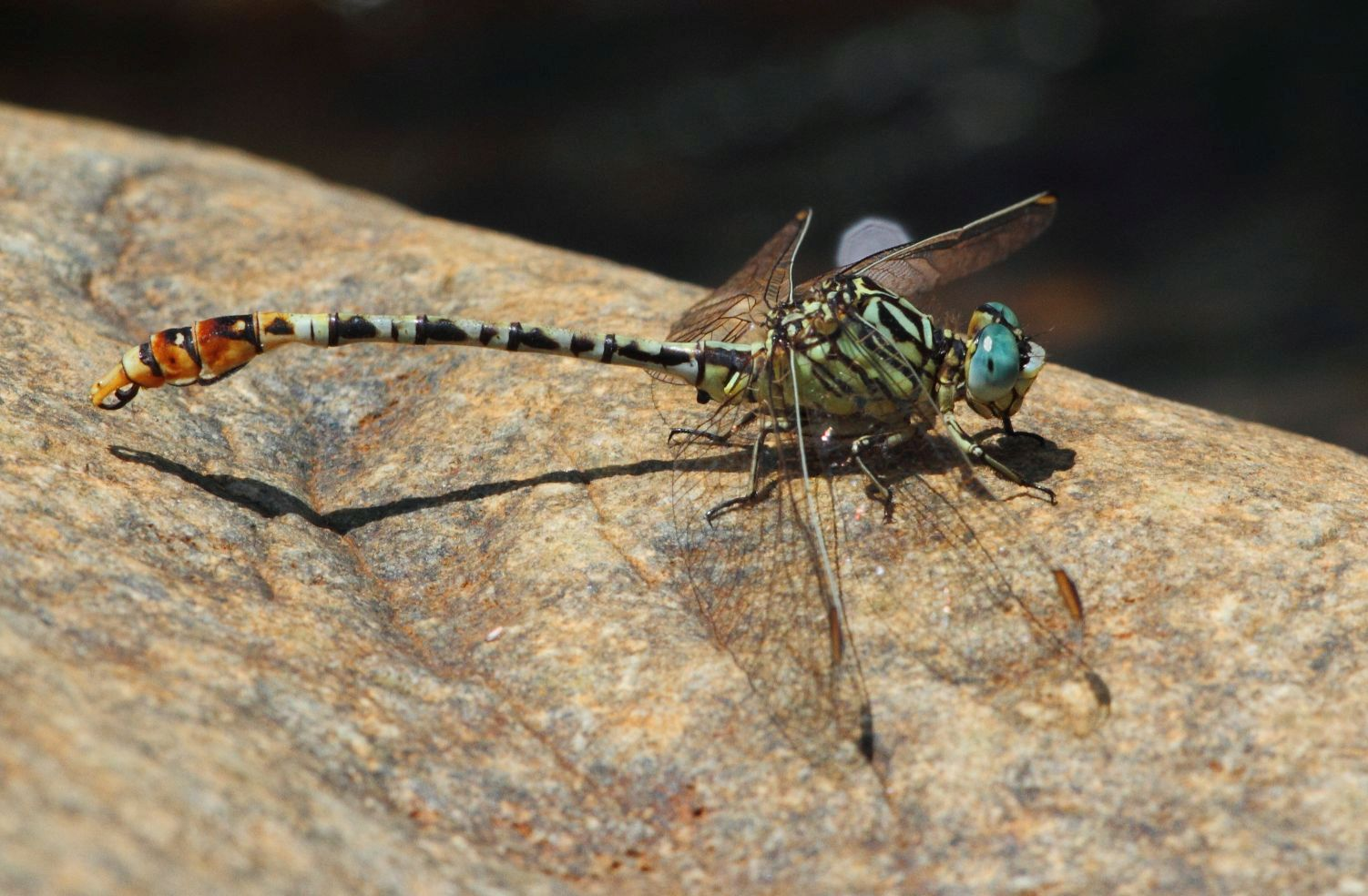
Male

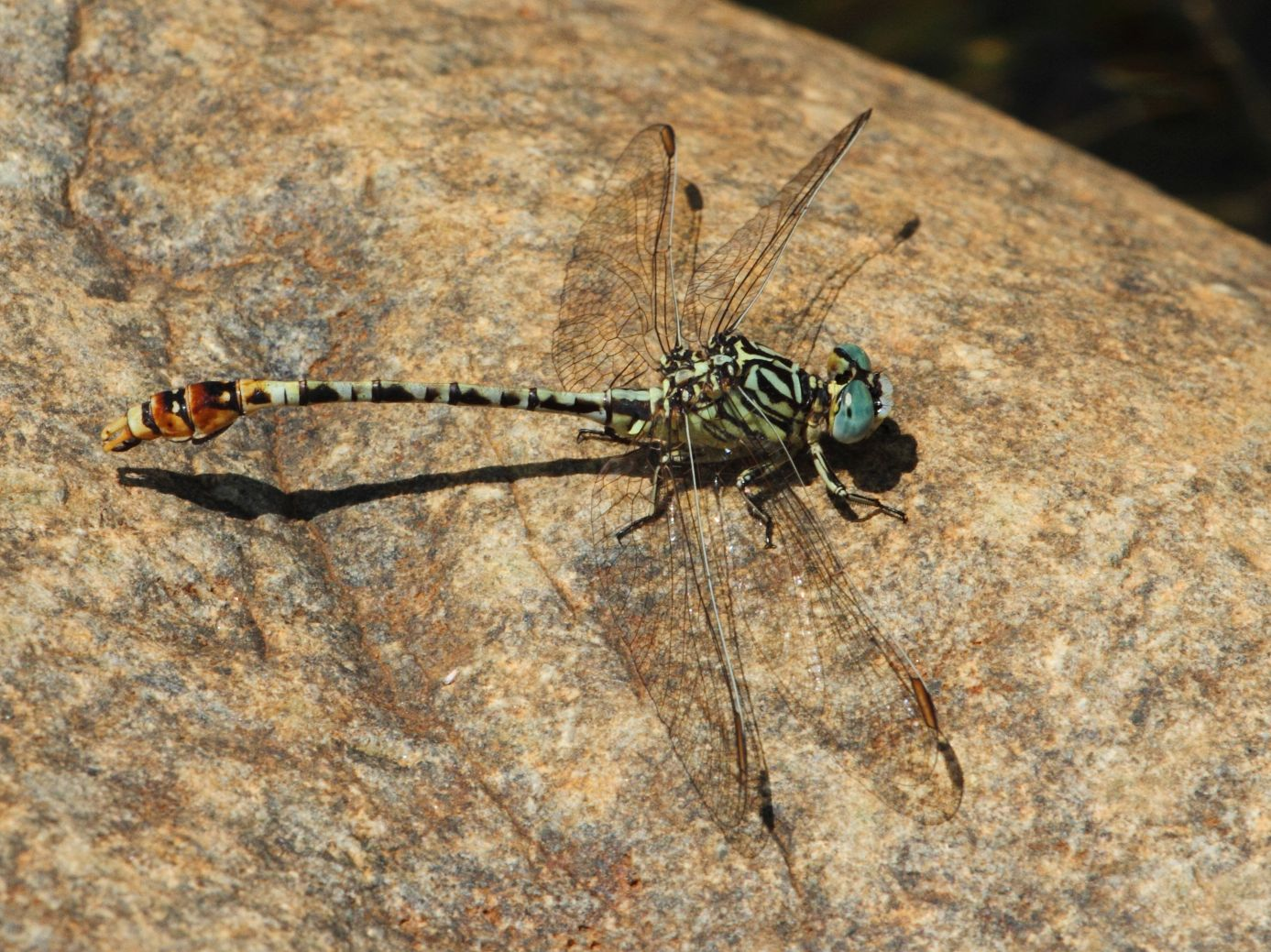
Male

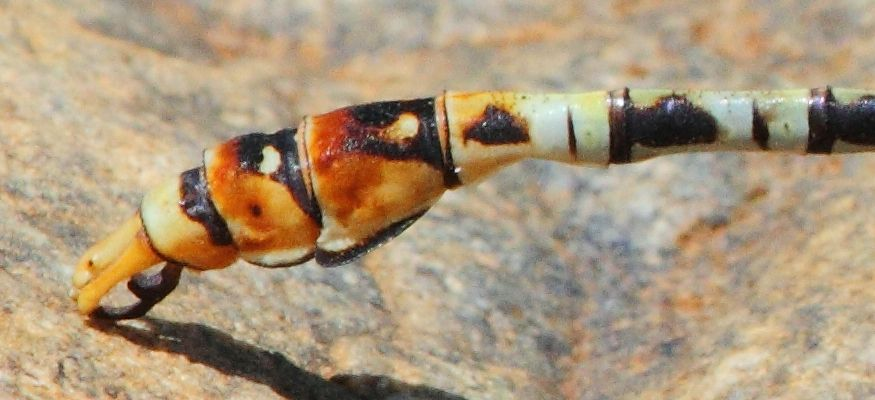
Detail of abdomen of male, showing claspers

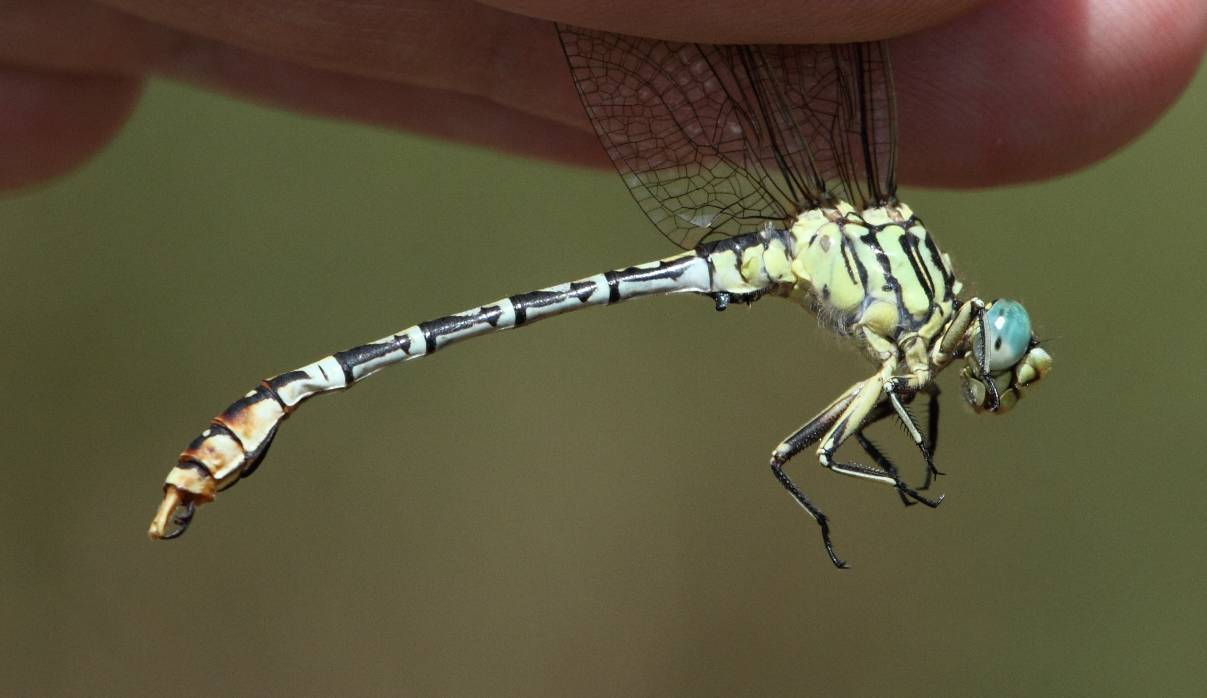
Male

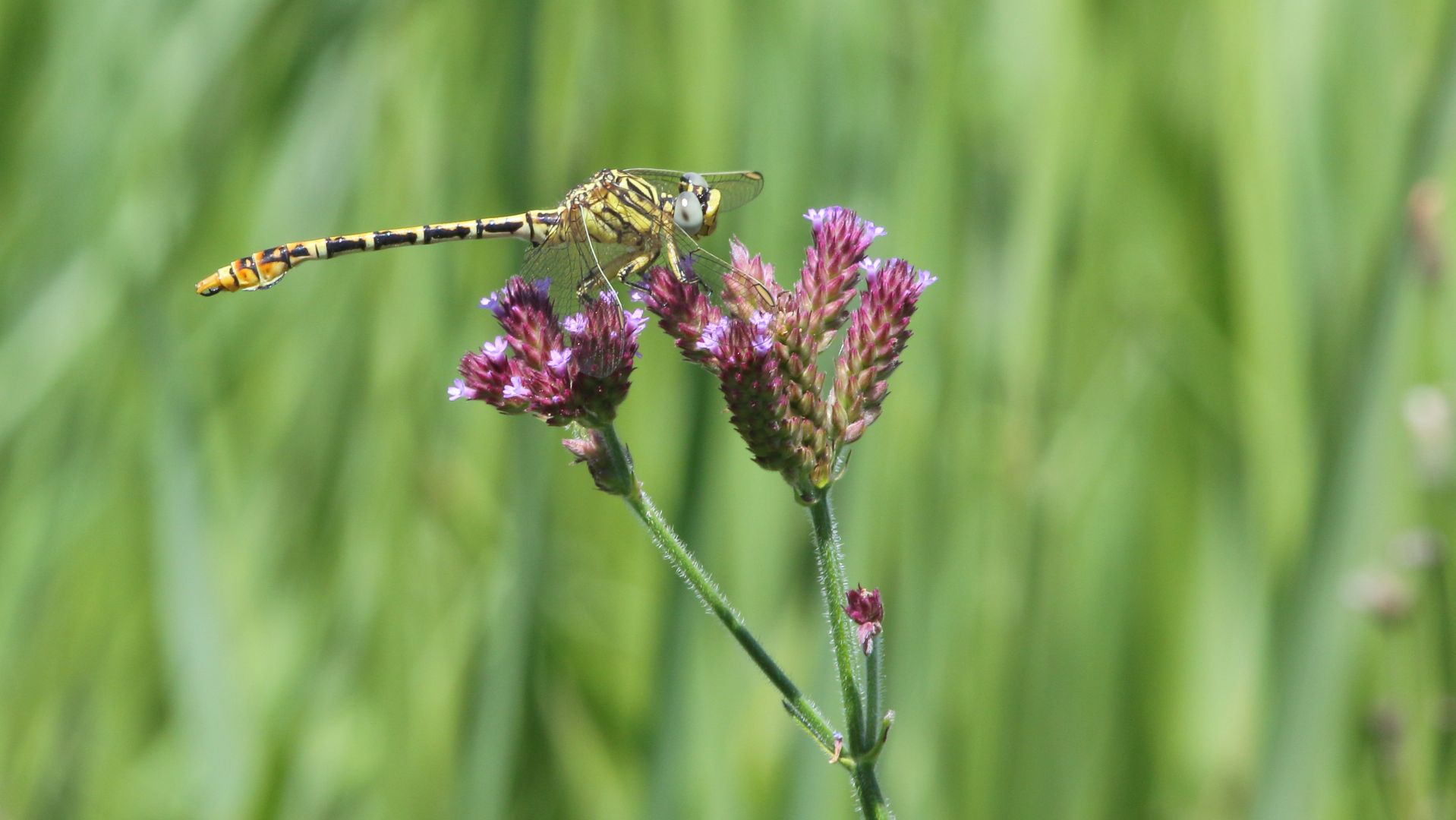
Male

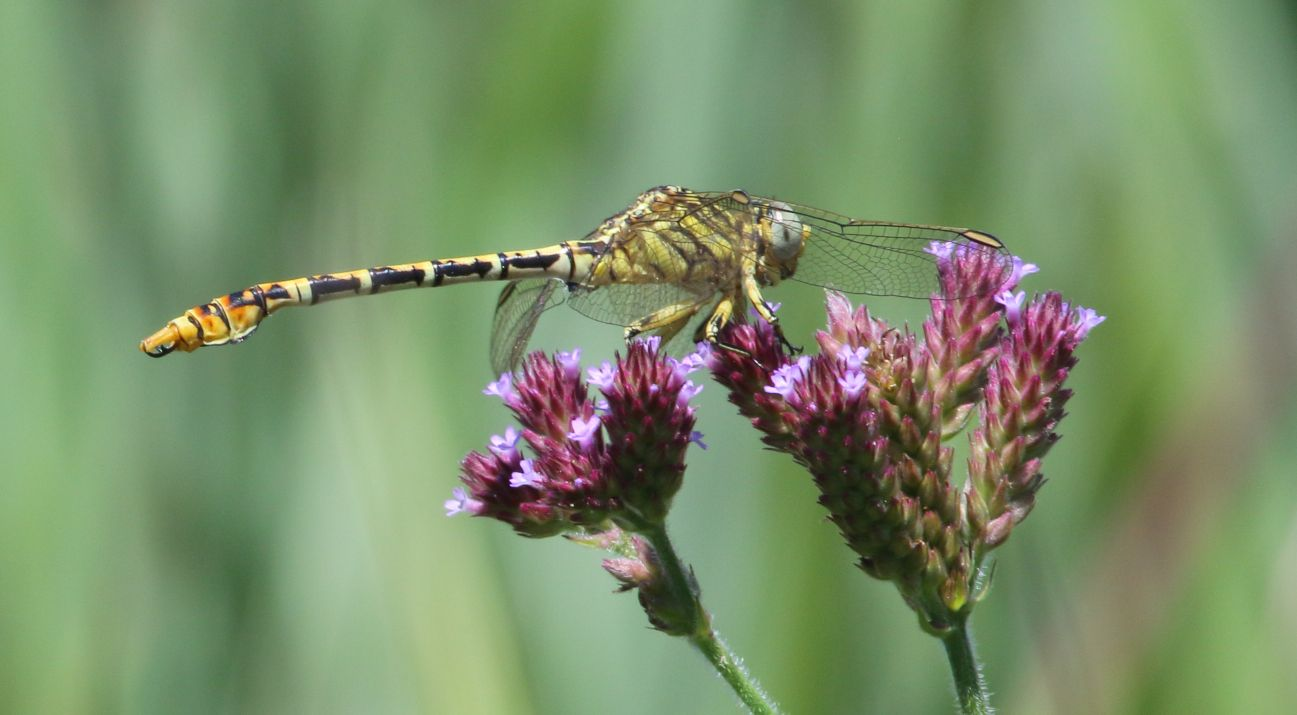
Male

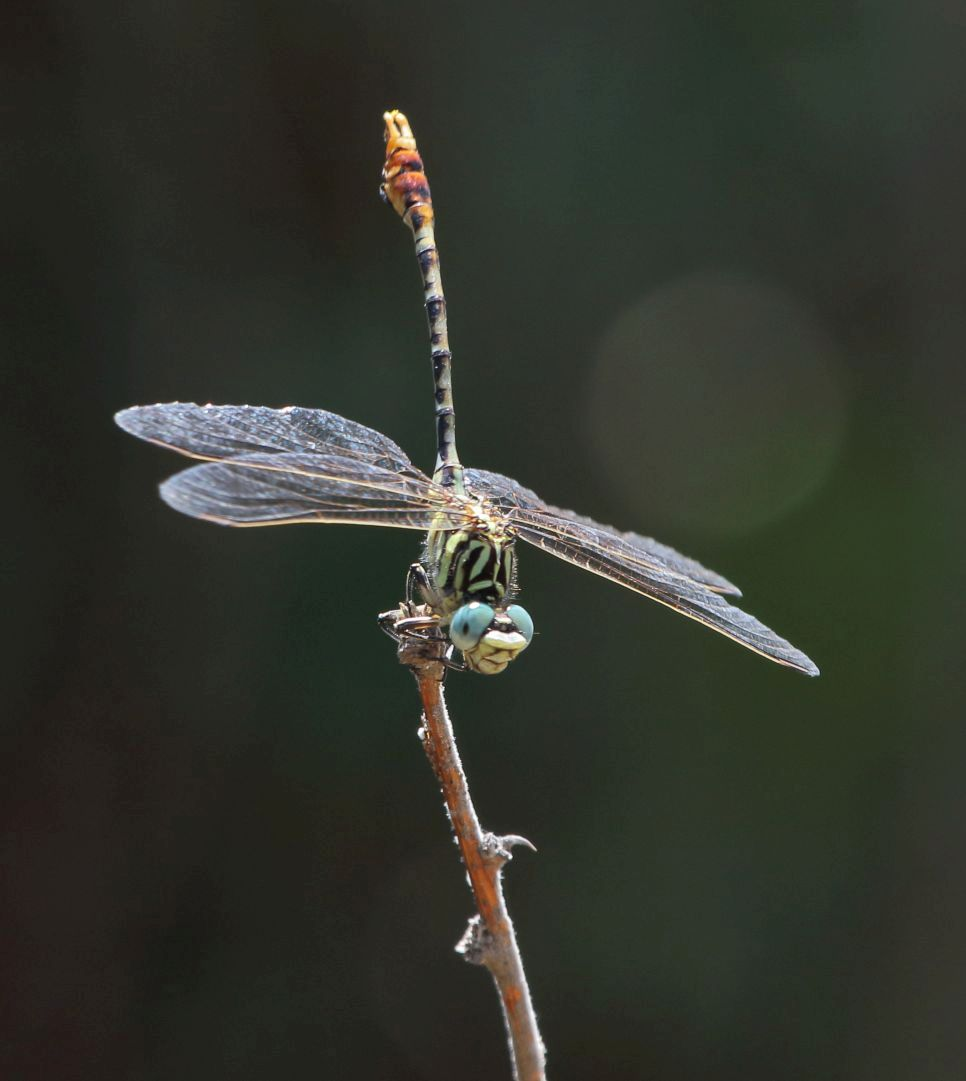
Male

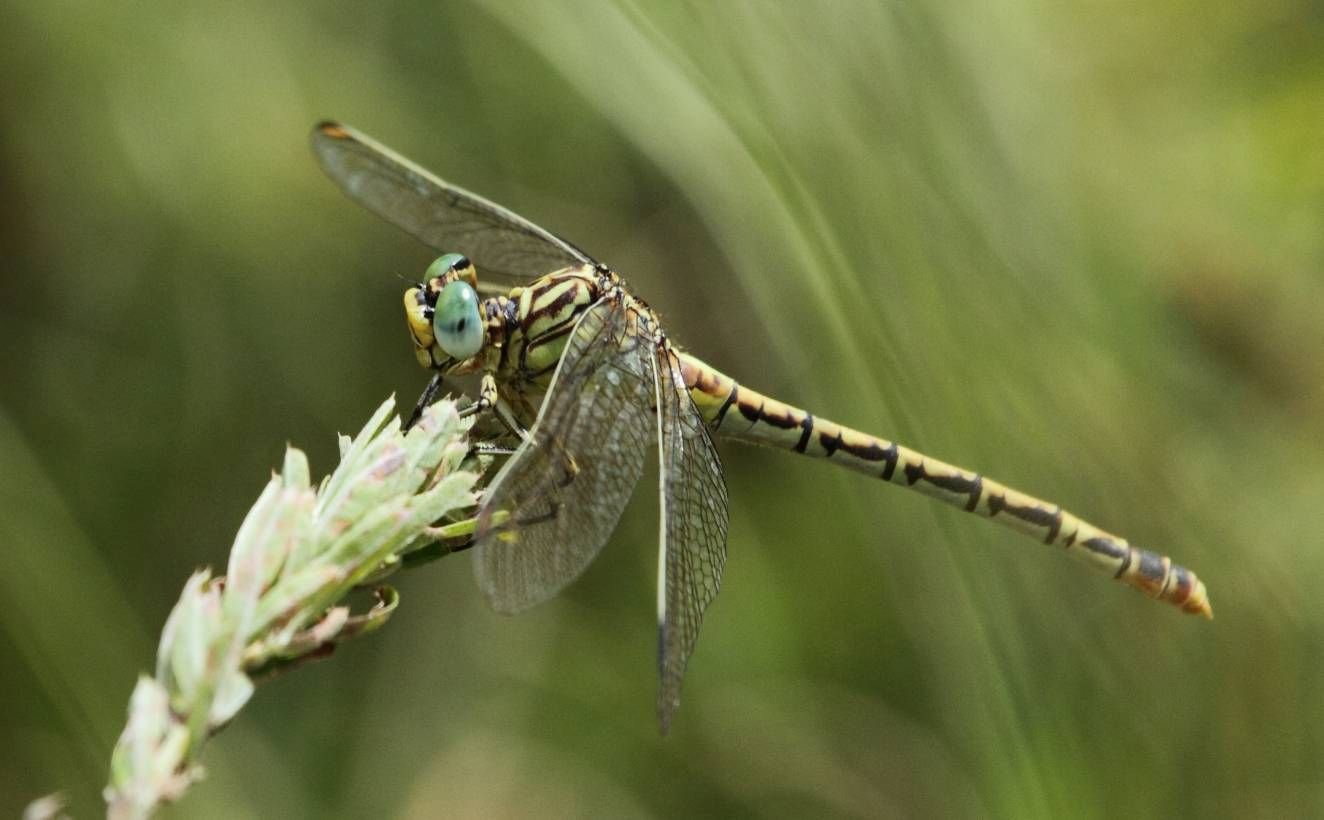
Female

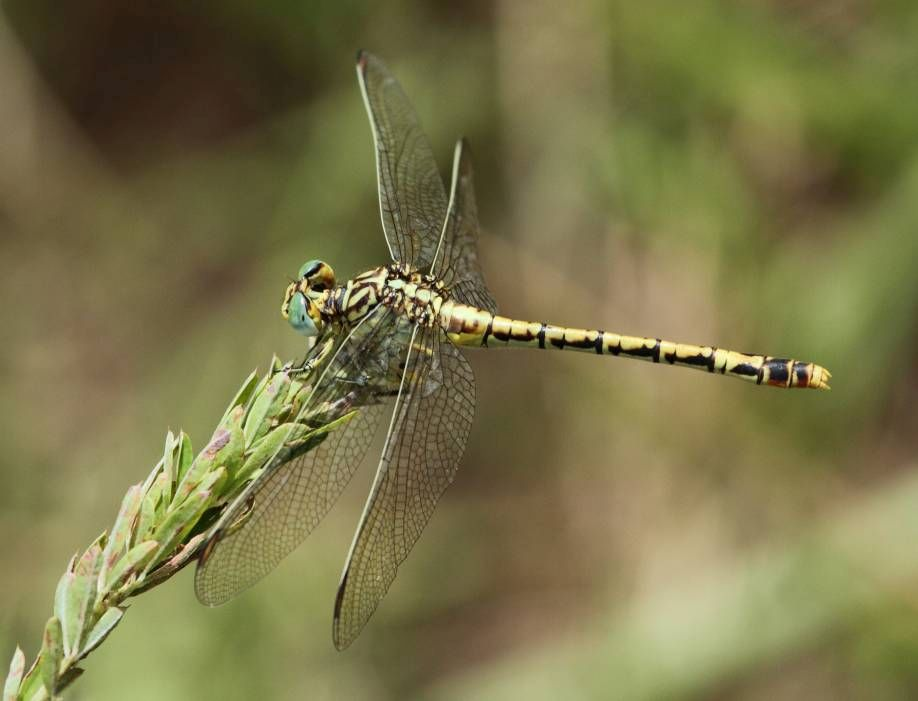
Female
