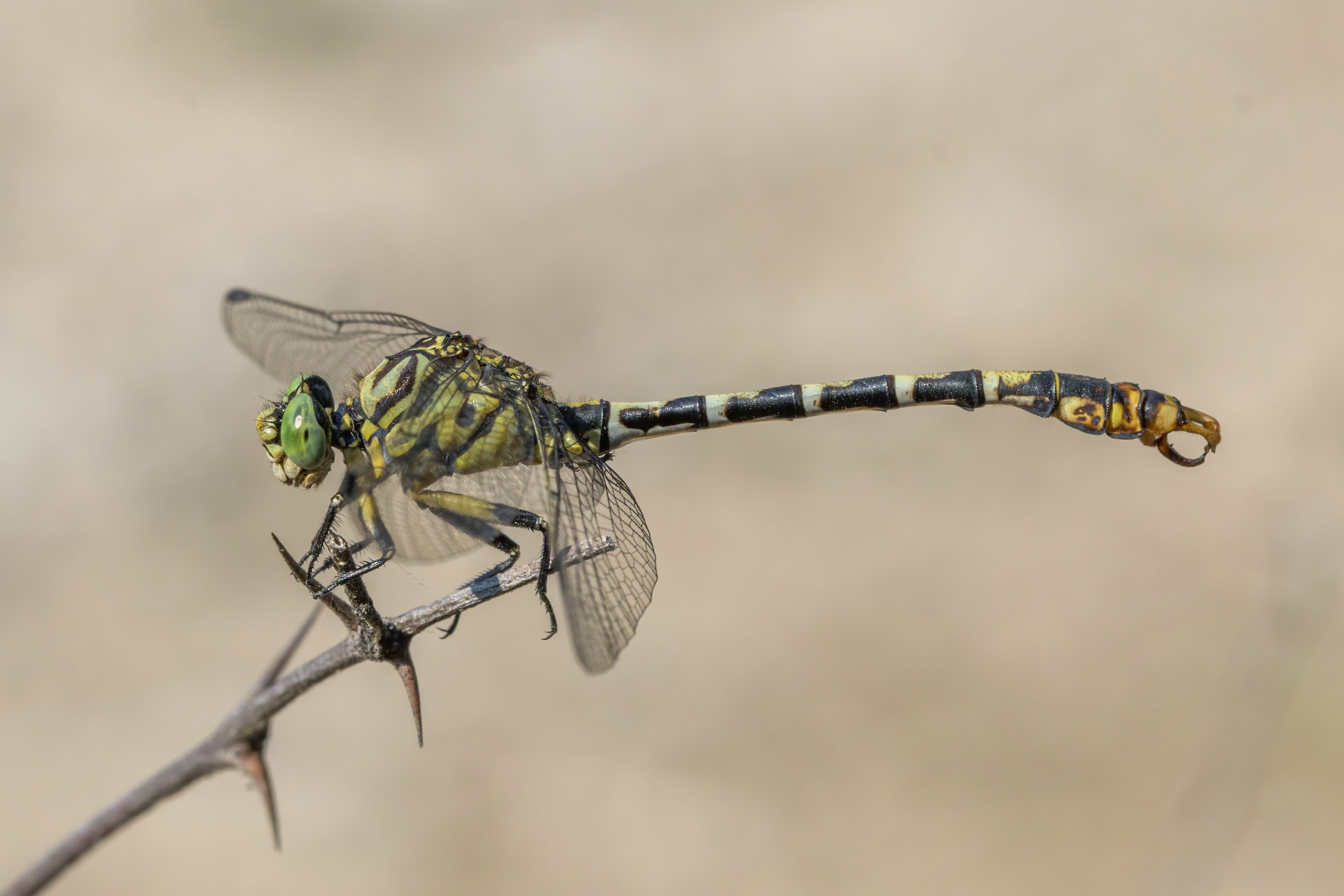
- Male, Bulgaria
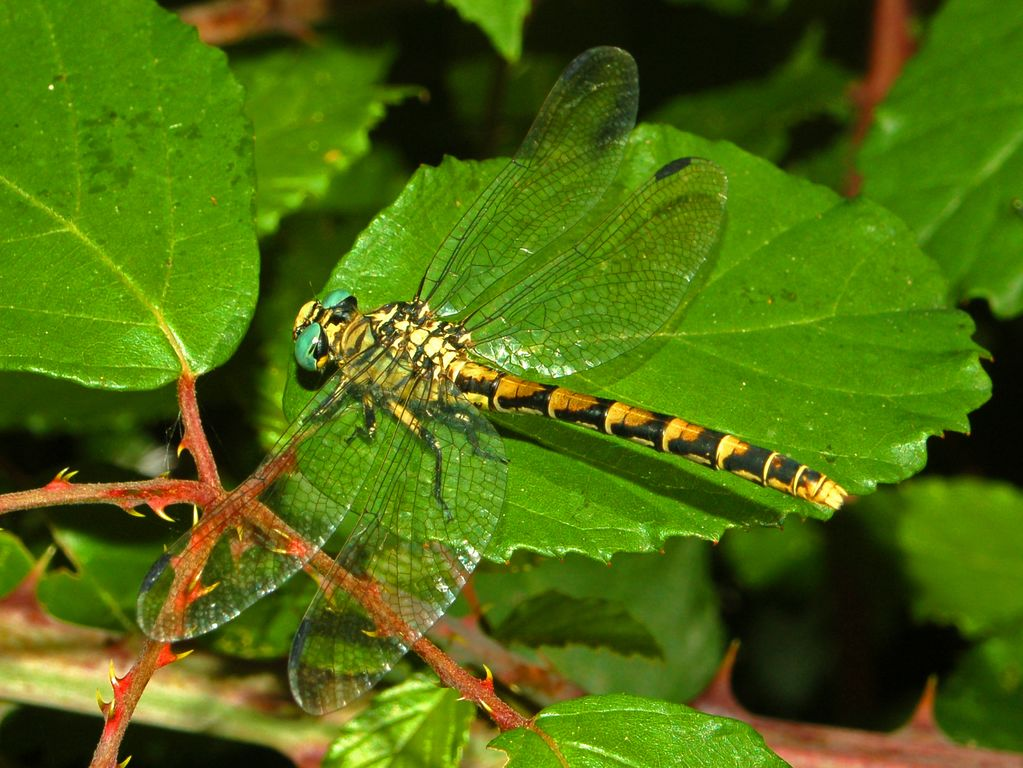
- Onychogomphus forcipatus var. unguiculatus, female

Conservation status
- Least Concern (IUCN 3.1)

Scientific classification
- Kingdom: Animalia
- Phylum: Arthropoda
- Class: Insecta
- Order: Odonata
- Infraorder: Anisoptera
- Family: Gomphidae
- Genus: Onychogomphus
- Species: O. forcipatus

Binomial name
- Onychogomphus forcipatus (Linnaeus, 1758)

Synonyms
- Libellula forcipata Linnaeus, 1758

= Onychogomphus forcipatus =

Species of dragonfly

Onychogomphus forcipatus, the small pincertail, green-eyed hooktail, or green-eyed hook-tailed dragonfly, is a species of dragonfly belonging to the family Gomphidae.

== Subspecies ==
Subspecies include:

- Onychogomphus forcipatus var. albotibialis Schmidt, 1954
- Onychogomphus forcipatus var. forcipatus (Linnaeus, 1758)
- Onychogomphus forcipatus var. unguiculatus (Vander Linden, 1820)

== Distribution ==
This quite common and widespread dragonfly is present in most of Europe, in North Africa (Algeria, Morocco, Tunisia), and in West/Central Asia (Armenia, Azerbaijan, Iran, Kazakhstan, and Turkmenistan).

== Habitat ==
These dragonflies usually inhabit clean rivers with a little faster running water and gravel or sandy banks. Occasionally they are also present at large lakes.

== Description ==
The adults of Onychogomphus forcipatus grow up to 6 centimetres (2.4 in) long, with a wingspan of 5.5–7.5 centimetres (2.2–3.0 in). The eyes of these medium-sized dragonflies are widely separated and grey-to-green. The two black lines on the side of the thorax are relatively narrow and touch the midline. It has a yellow line on the vertex and two cells above the anal triangle. The abdomen in males is fitted with three hooks of large size (anal appendages). Cercoids may be dark and have a subterminal tooth. The base of the hindwing is angled in males and rounded in females.

This species is rather similar to Onychogomphus uncatus. The two species can be distinguished on the basis of the shape and extension of the black markings, especially on the thorax and on the last abdominal segments.

== Biology ==
Adults can be encountered close to running water and lakes from June through September. In Southern Europe, the emergence period typically begins in April. In Cyprus, the flight season of the subspecies O. f. albotibialis is from late March to October. This subspecies is classified as a Near-threatened species. After the mating the females lay about 500 eggs into the water. Larvae dig and live buried in the bottom. Their life cycle from egg to imago lasts about 3–5 years.

== Gallery ==
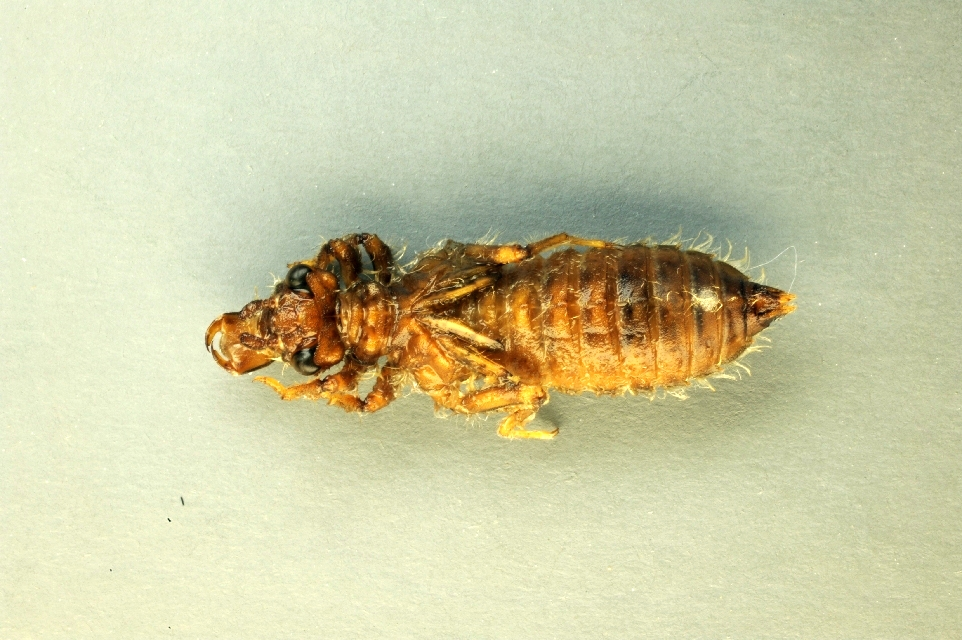
Exuvia

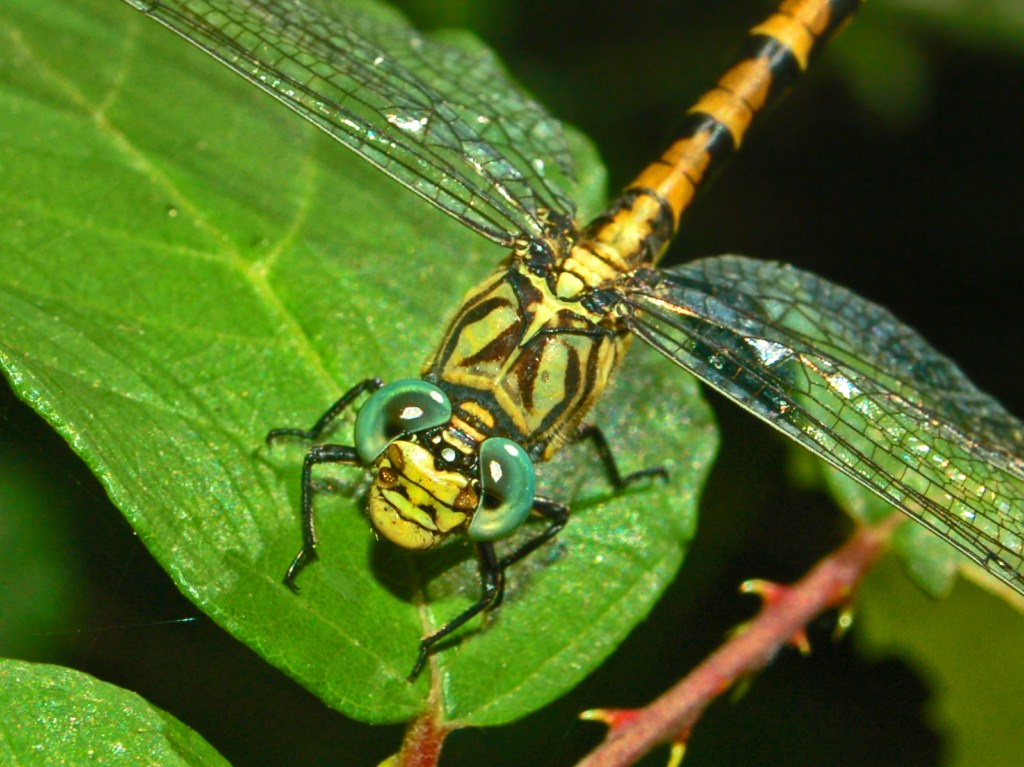
Female O. f. unguiculatus, close-up on head

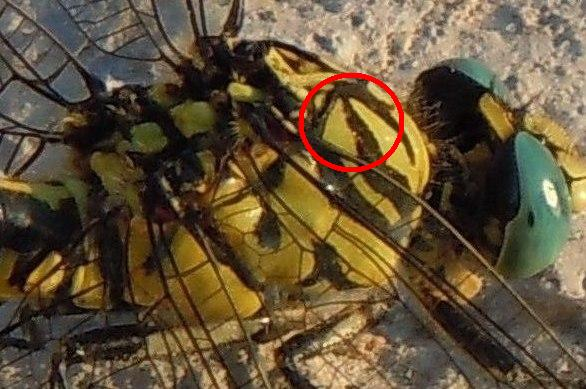
Close-up on thorax, the two black lines touch the midline

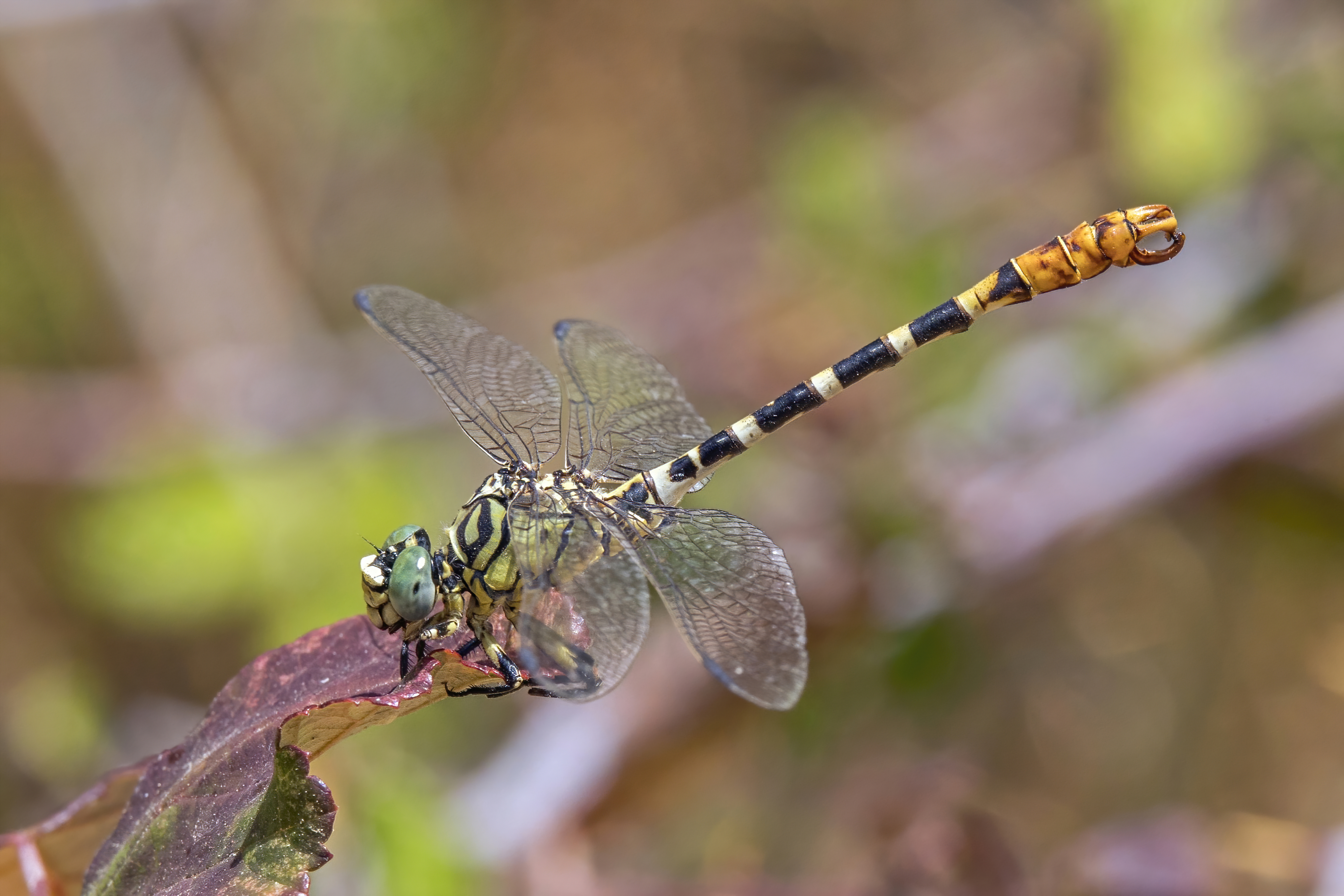
male O. f. albotibialis, Cyprus

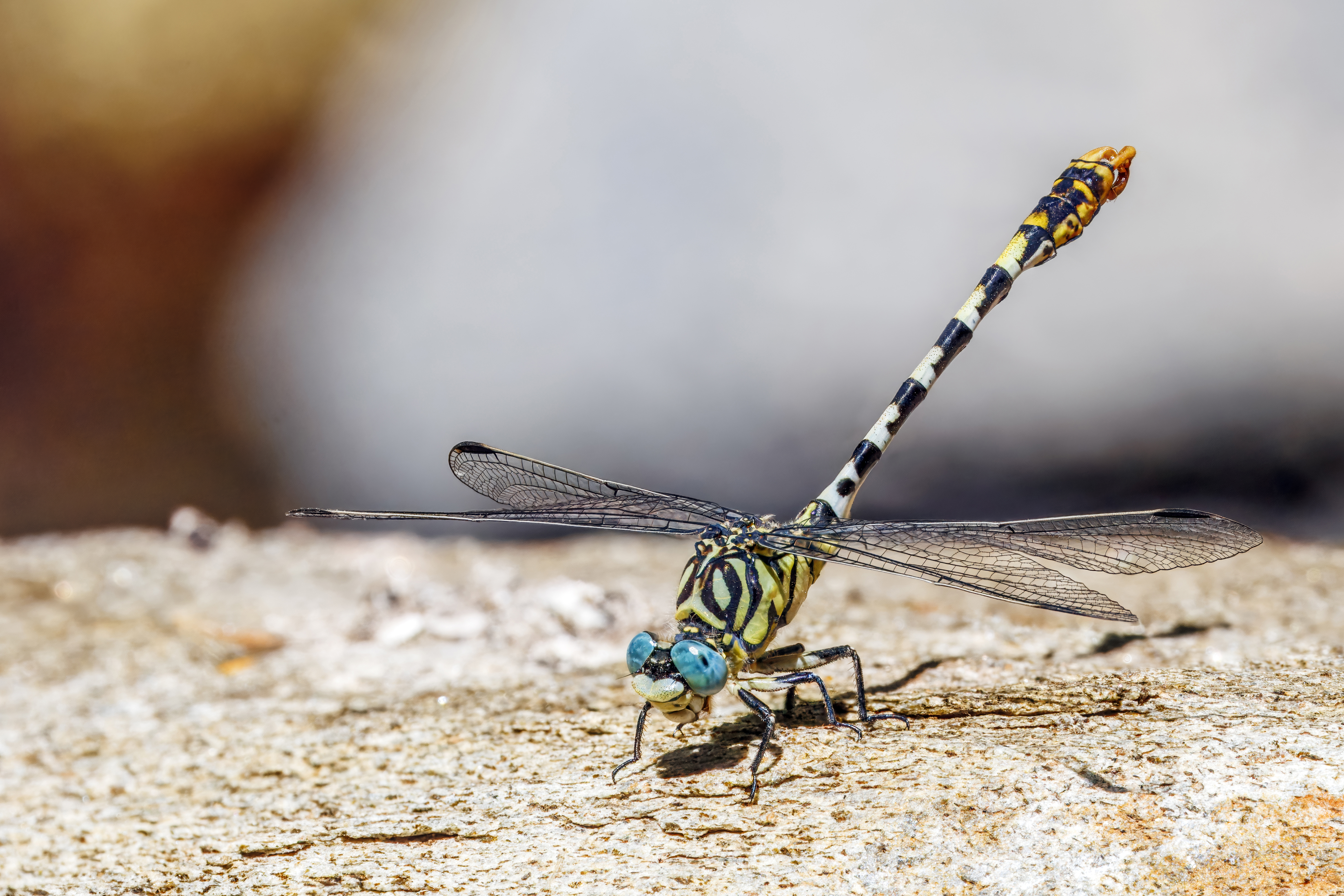
male O. f. albotibialis, Turkey
