= Onychogomphus macrodon =

Conservation status
- Vulnerable (IUCN 3.1)

Scientific classification
- Kingdom: Animalia
- Phylum: Arthropoda
- Class: Insecta
- Order: Odonata
- Infraorder: Anisoptera
- Family: Gomphidae
- Genus: Onychogomphus
- Species: O. macrodon

Binomial name
- Onychogomphus macrodon Selys, 1887

Species of dragonfly

Onychogomphus macrodon, also known as the Levant pincertail, is a species of dragonfly in the family Gomphidae.

== Etymology ==
Onychogomphus macrodon was first described in 1887 by Edmond de Sélys Longchamps in Beirut. Its common name, Levant pincertail, references the geographic region in which it is found, the Levant.

== Geographic range and habitat ==
Onychogomphus macrodon is found in Israel, Jordan, Lebanon, Syria, and Turkey. Its natural habitat is wetlands and freshwater rivers. Due to contemporary increases in the development of energy production and water management infrastructure, it is threatened by habitat loss.
