= Onychogomphus styx =

Conservation status
- Least Concern (IUCN 3.1)

Scientific classification
- Kingdom: Animalia
- Phylum: Arthropoda
- Class: Insecta
- Order: Odonata
- Infraorder: Anisoptera
- Family: Gomphidae
- Genus: Onychogomphus
- Species: O. styx

Binomial name
- Onychogomphus styx Pinhey, 1961

Species of dragonfly

Onychogomphus styx is a species of dragonfly in the family Gomphidae. It is found in Kenya, Tanzania, Uganda, Zambia, and possibly Guinea. Its natural habitats are subtropical or tropical moist lowland forests and rivers. It is threatened by habitat loss.
