= Onychogomphus malabarensis =

Conservation status
- Data Deficient (IUCN 3.1)

Scientific classification
- Kingdom: Animalia
- Phylum: Arthropoda
- Class: Insecta
- Order: Odonata
- Infraorder: Anisoptera
- Family: Gomphidae
- Genus: Onychogomphus
- Species: O. malabarensis

Binomial name
- Onychogomphus malabarensis (Fraser,1924)

Synonyms
- Lamelligomphus malabarensis Fraser,1924

Species of dragonfly

Onychogomphus malabarensis is a species of dragonfly in the family Gomphidae. It is endemic to the streams of Western Ghats of India.

The species is known from a single specimen collected by T.N. Hearsey in 1921 from Palakkad. The species may be collected from forests around Palakkad.

== See also ==
- List of odonates of India
- List of odonata of Kerala
