= Onychogomphus bwambae =

Conservation status
- Data Deficient (IUCN 3.1)

Scientific classification
- Domain: Eukaryota
- Kingdom: Animalia
- Phylum: Arthropoda
- Class: Insecta
- Order: Odonata
- Infraorder: Anisoptera
- Family: Gomphidae
- Genus: Onychogomphus
- Species: O. bwambae

Binomial name
- Onychogomphus bwambae Pinhey, 1961

Species of dragonfly

Onychogomphus bwambae is a species of dragonfly in the family Gomphidae. It is endemic to Uganda. Its natural habitats are subtropical or tropical moist lowland forests and rivers. It is threatened by habitat loss.

== Sources ==
- Clausnitzer, V. 2005. Onychogomphus bwambae. 2006 IUCN Red List of Threatened Species. Downloaded on 10 August 2007.
