= Onychogomphus pilosus =

Conservation status
- Data Deficient (IUCN 3.1)

Scientific classification
- Kingdom: Animalia
- Phylum: Arthropoda
- Class: Insecta
- Order: Odonata
- Infraorder: Anisoptera
- Family: Gomphidae
- Genus: Onychogomphus
- Species: O. pilosus

Binomial name
- Onychogomphus pilosus (Martin, 1912)

Species of dragonfly

Onychogomphus pilosus is a species of dragonfly in the family Gomphidae. It is found in Ethiopia, Kenya, and Tanzania.
