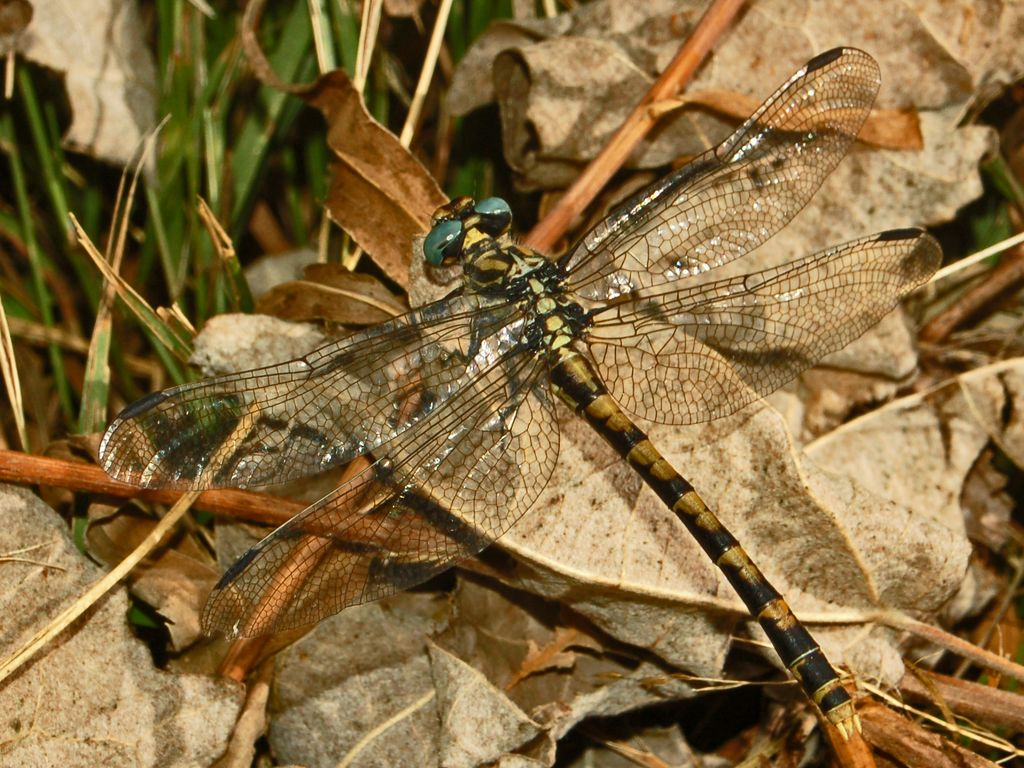
- Onychogomphus uncatus, female

Scientific classification
- Domain: Eukaryota
- Kingdom: Animalia
- Phylum: Arthropoda
- Class: Insecta
- Order: Odonata
- Infraorder: Anisoptera
- Family: Gomphidae
- Genus: Onychogomphus
- Species: O. uncatus

Binomial name
- Onychogomphus uncatus (Charpentier, 1840)

Synonyms
- Aeshna uncata Charpentier, 1840

= Onychogomphus uncatus =

Species of dragonfly

Onychogomphus uncatus, the large pincertail or blue-eyed hook-tailed dragonfly, is a species of dragonflies belonging to the family Gomphidae.

== Distribution ==
This species is present in Belgium, France, Germany, Italy, Spain, Portugal and Switzerland.

== Habitat ==
These dragonflies can be encountered close to running water and lakes.

== Description ==
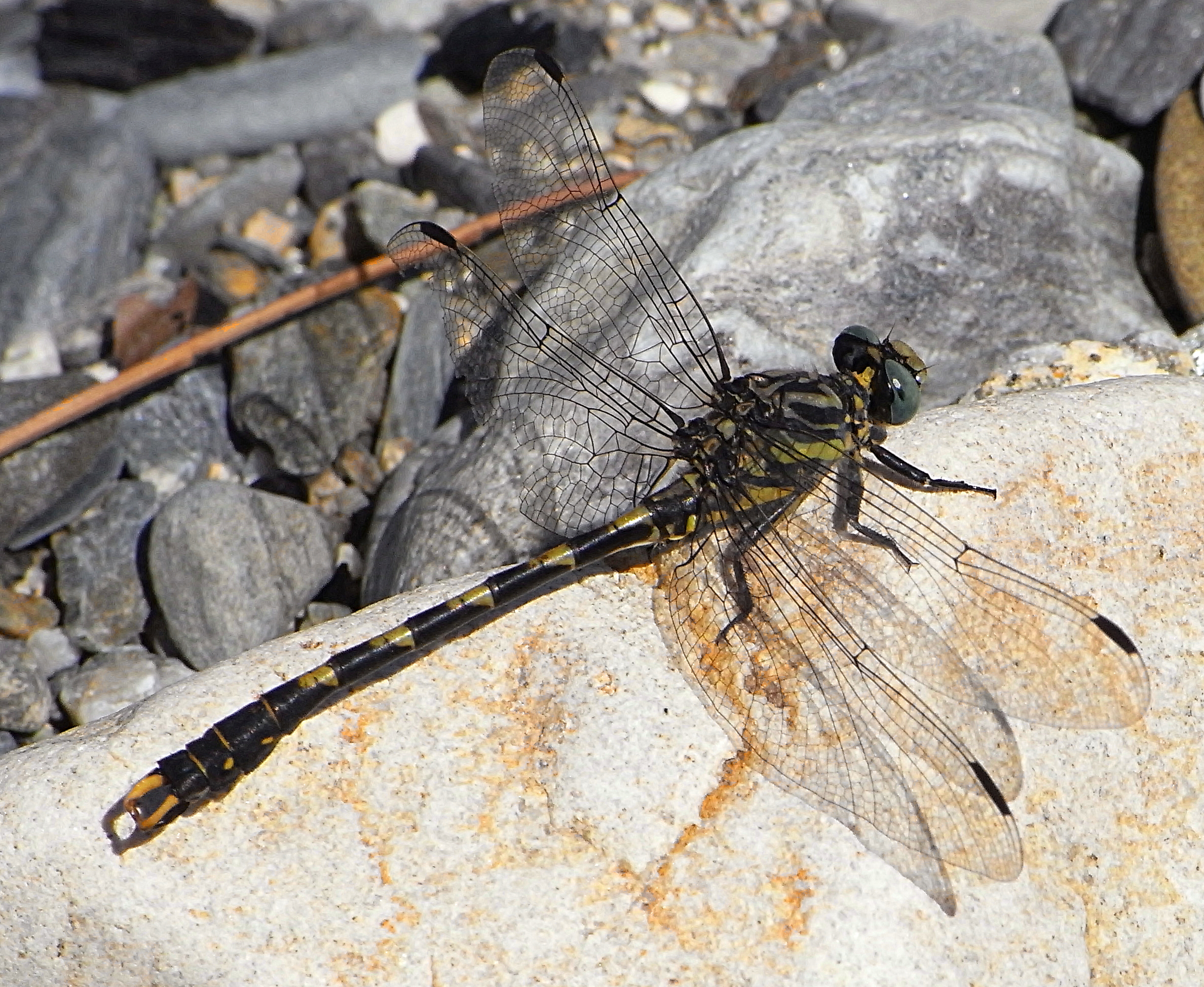
Male

The adults of Onychogomphus uncatus grow up to 65 millimetres (2.6 in) long. The eyes are widely separated and bright-blue or gray-blue, never green. The front black line on the side of the thorax does not touch the midline. The yellow collar at the front of the thorax is interrupted by a black bar. It has four cells on the anal triangle of the rear wing, but no yellow line on the 'vertex'. Cercoids are always yellow.

This dragonfly is bigger and rarer than the small pincertail (Onychogomphus forcipatus), but they are rather similar. The two species can be distinguished on the basis of the shape and extension of the black markings, especially on the thorax and on the last abdominal segments.

== Biology ==
Adults of these dragonflies can be found from mid April through late August. Their life cycle lasts about three years.

== Gallery ==
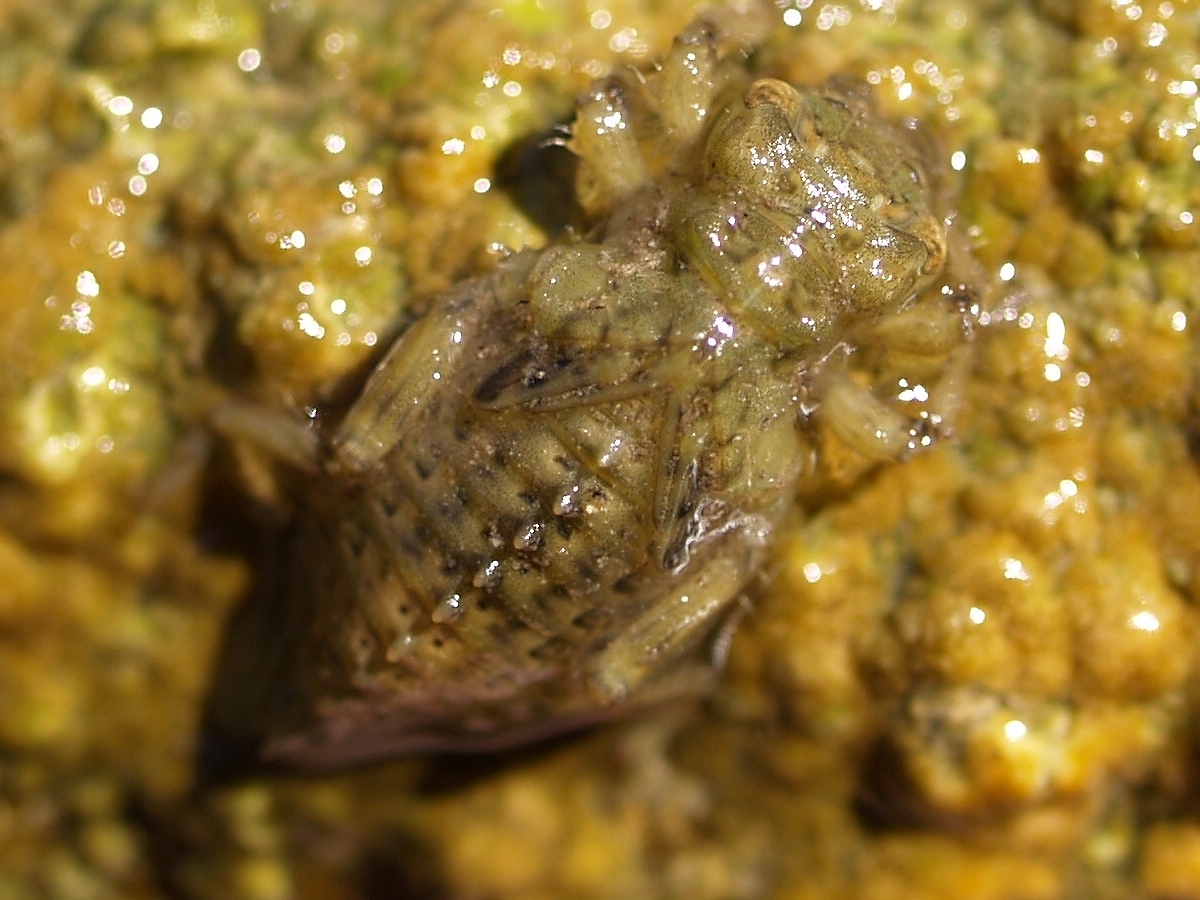
Nymph

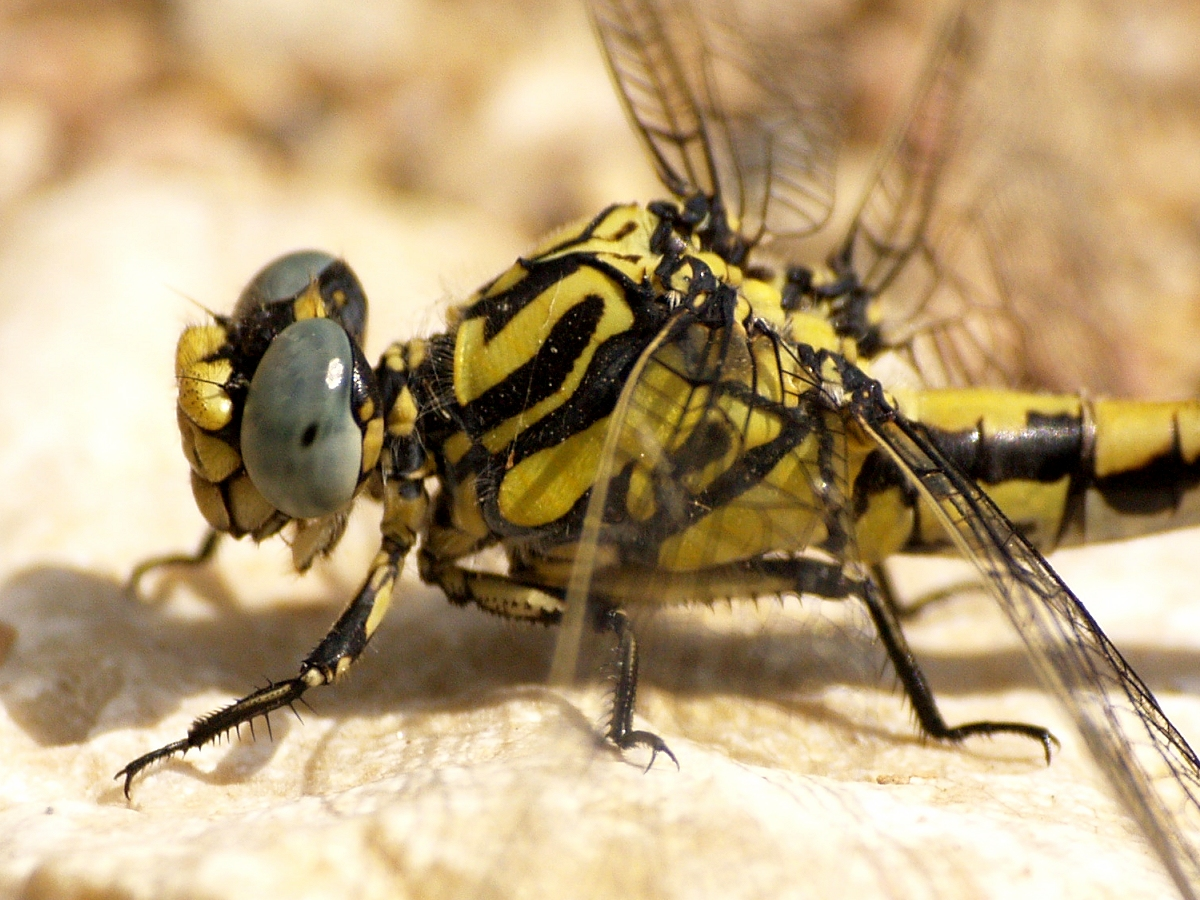
Close-up on thorax

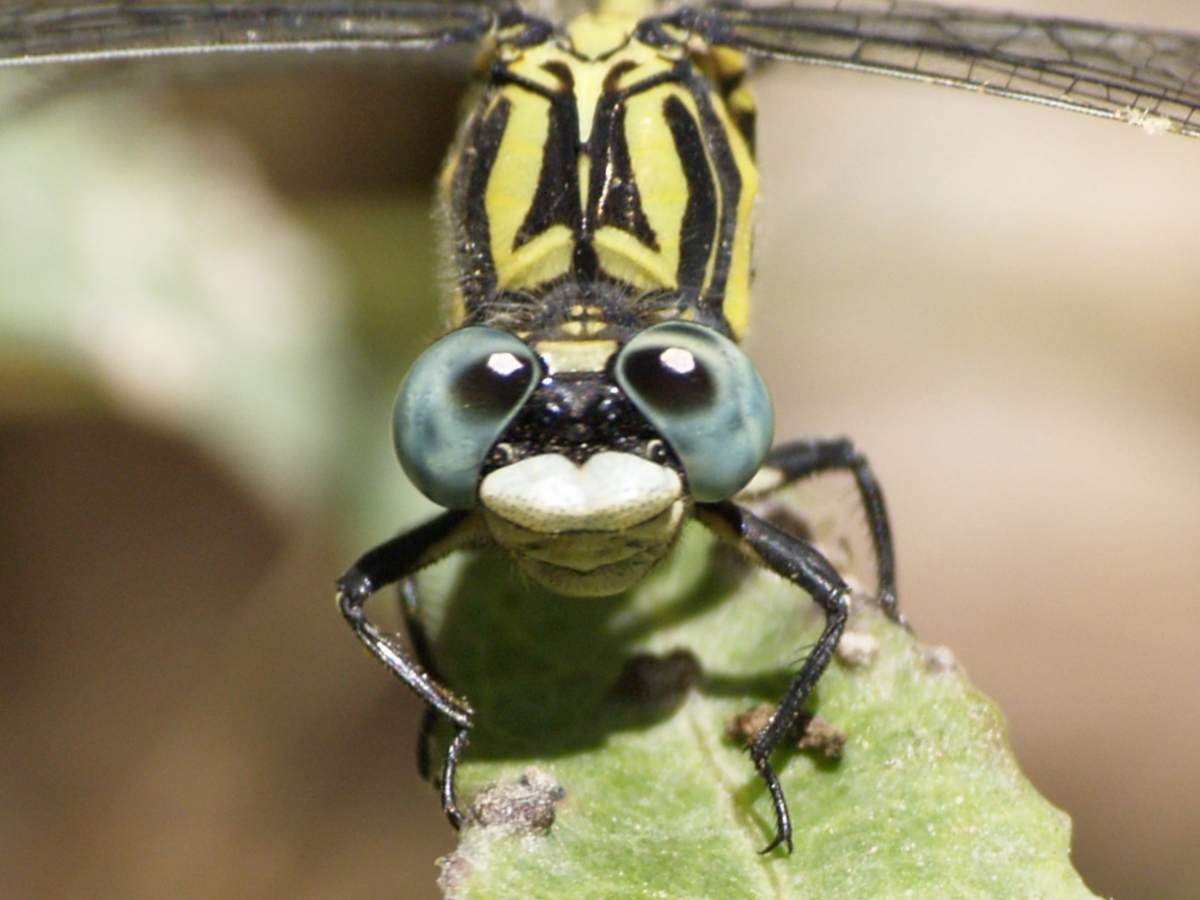
Details of thorax and eyes

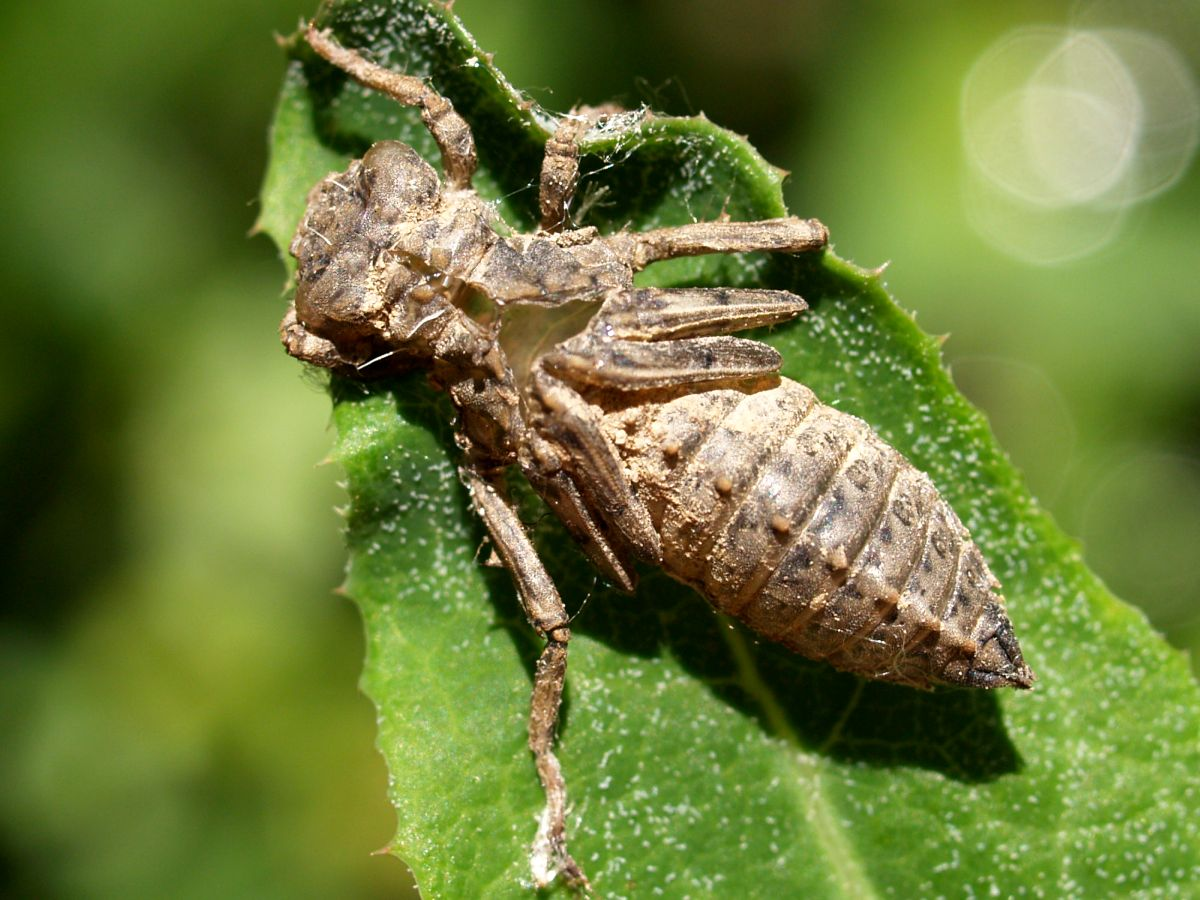
Exuvia
