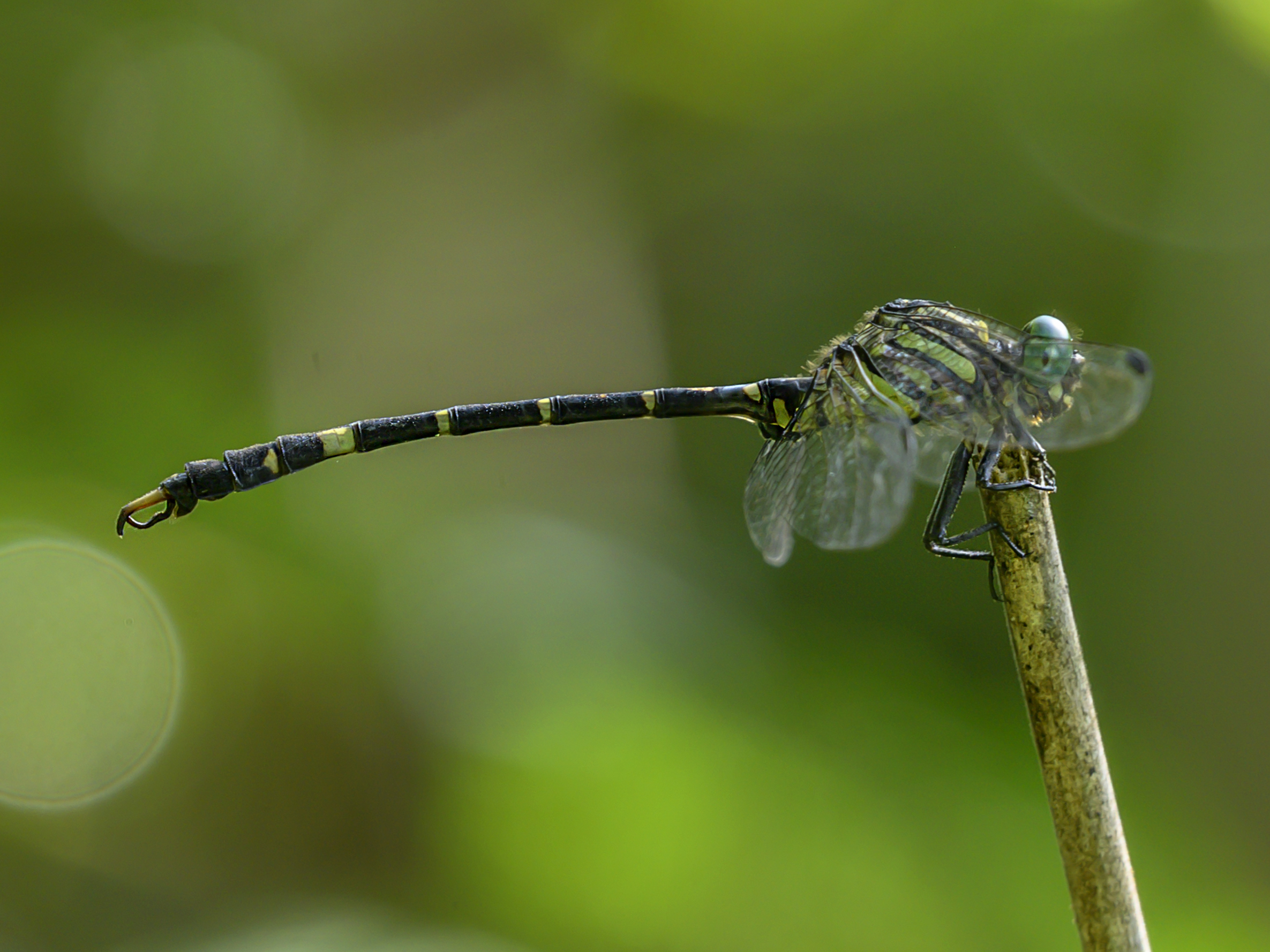
- Nychogomphus striatus

Scientific classification
- Kingdom: Animalia
- Phylum: Arthropoda
- Class: Insecta
- Order: Odonata
- Infraorder: Anisoptera
- Superfamily: Gomphoidea
- Family: Gomphidae
- Genus: Nychogomphus; Carle, 1986

= Nychogomphus =

Genus of dragonflies

Nychogomphus is a genus of dragonflies in the family Gomphidae, erected by Frank Carle in 1986. Species have been recorded from the Himalayas, China, Indochina and western Malesia.

== Species ==
The Global Biodiversity Information Facility lists:

1. Nychogomphus bidentatus Yang, Mao & Zhang, 2010
2. Nychogomphus duaricus (Fraser, 1924)
3. Nychogomphus flavicaudus (Chao, 1982)
4. Nychogomphus geometricus (Selys, 1854)
5. Nychogomphus lui Zhou, Zhou & Lu, 2005
6. Nychogomphus saundersii (Selys, 1854)
7. Nychogomphus striatus (Fraser, 1924)
8. Nychogomphus yangi Zhang, 2014
