= Onychogomphus kitchingmani =

Conservation status
- Data Deficient (IUCN 3.1)

Scientific classification
- Kingdom: Animalia
- Phylum: Arthropoda
- Clade: Pancrustacea
- Class: Insecta
- Order: Odonata
- Suborder: Anisoptera
- Family: Gomphidae
- Genus: Onychogomphus
- Species: O. kitchingmani

Binomial name
- Onychogomphus kitchingmani Pinhey, 1964

Species of dragonfly

Onychogomphus kitchingmani is a species of dragonfly in the family Gomphidae. It is endemic to Zambia. Its natural habitat is rivers.
