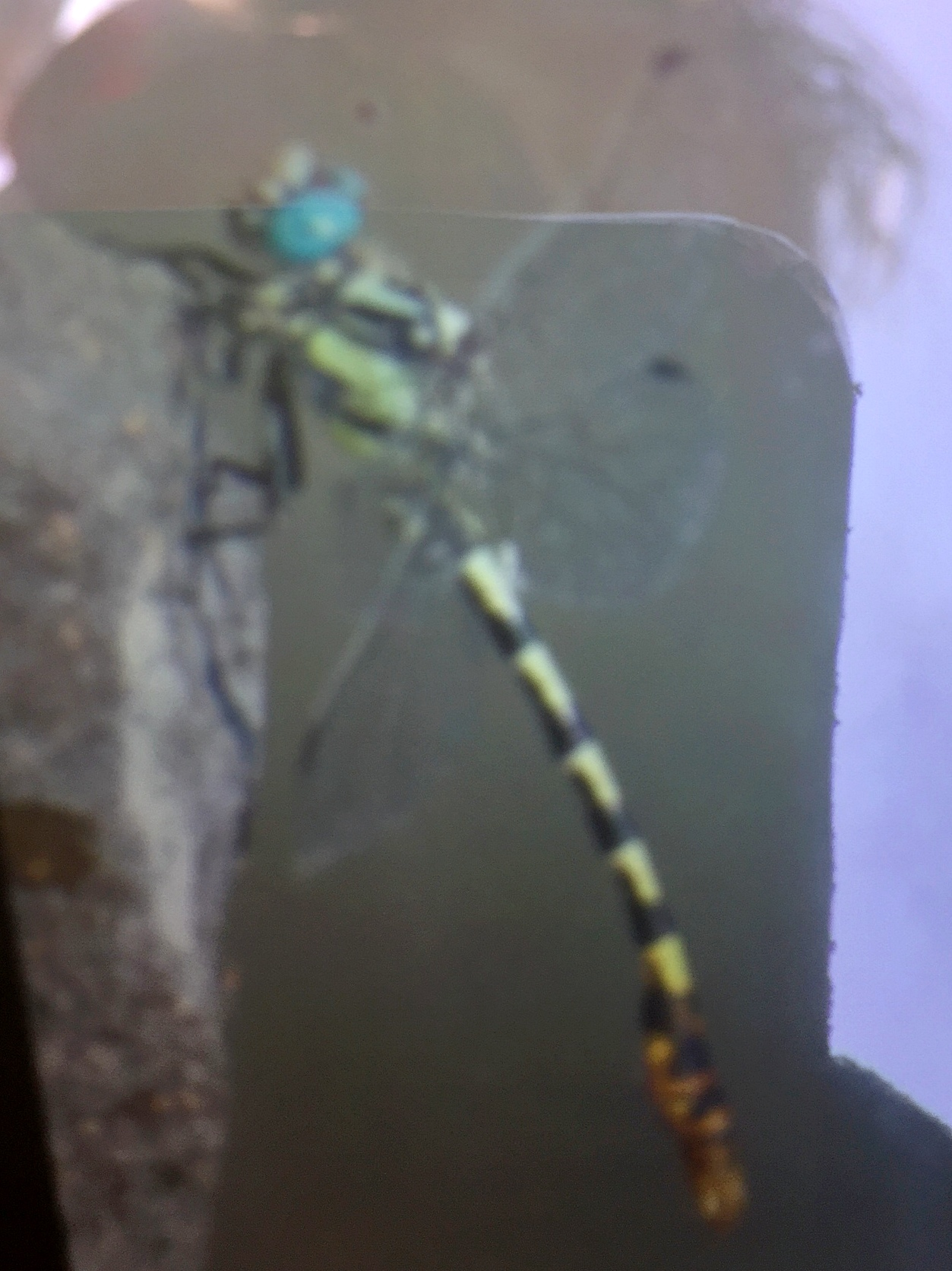

Conservation status
- Vulnerable (IUCN 3.1)

Scientific classification
- Kingdom: Animalia
- Phylum: Arthropoda
- Class: Insecta
- Order: Odonata
- Infraorder: Anisoptera
- Family: Gomphidae
- Genus: Onychogomphus
- Species: O. assimilis

Binomial name
- Onychogomphus assimilis (Schneider, 1845)

= Onychogomphus assimilis =

Species of dragonfly

Onychogomphus assimilis is a species of dragonfly in the family Gomphidae. It is found in Armenia, Georgia, Iran, Turkey, and Turkmenistan. Its natural habitat is rivers. It is threatened by habitat loss.
