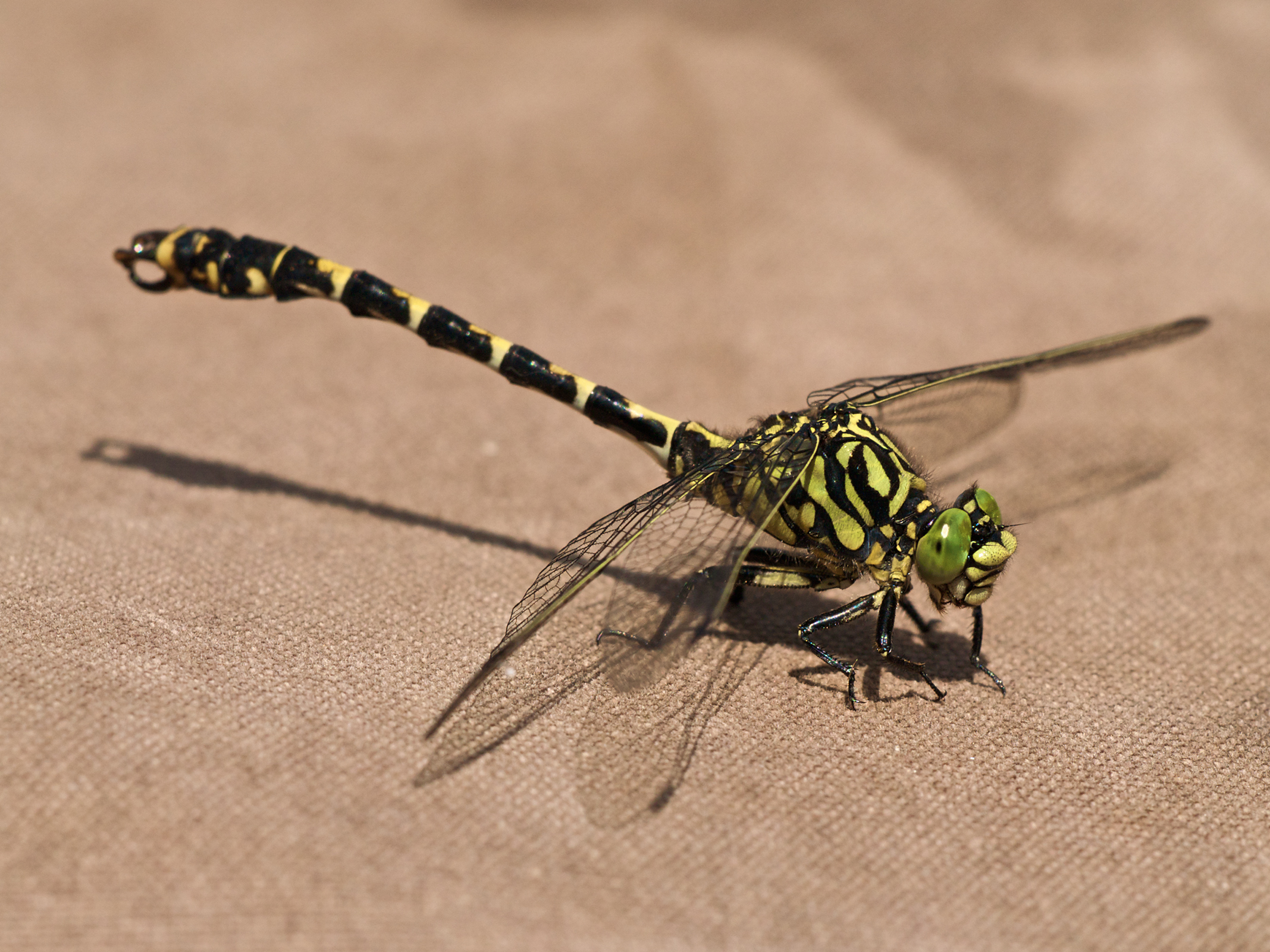
- Onychogomphus forcipatus

Scientific classification
- Kingdom: Animalia
- Phylum: Arthropoda
- Class: Insecta
- Order: Odonata
- Infraorder: Anisoptera
- Family: Gomphidae
- Genus: Onychogomphus; Selys, 1854

= Onychogomphus =

Genus of dragonflies

Onychogomphus is a genus of dragonflies in the family Gomphidae. They are commonly known as pincertails.

== Species ==
The genus contains the following species:

- Onychogomphus acinaces Laidlaw, 1922
- Onychogomphus aequistylus Selys, 1892
- Onychogomphus annularis Selys, 1894
- Onychogomphus assimilis Schneider, 1845 – Dark Pincertail
- Onychogomphus banteng Lieftinck, 1929
- Onychogomphus boudoti Ferreira, Velo-Anton., Brochard, Vieira, Celio Alves, Thompson, Watts & Brito 2014
- Onychogomphus bwambae Pinhey, 1961
- Onychogomphus cacharicus Martin, 1904
- Onychogomphus castor Lieftinck, 1941
- Onychogomphus cazuma 2020
- Onychogomphus choui (Chao & Liu, 1989)
- Onychogomphus costae Selys, 1885 – Faded Pincertail
- Onychogomphus dingavani Fraser, 1924
- Onychogomphus emiliae Legrand, 1992
- Onychogomphus flavifrons Selys, 1894
- Onychogomphus flexuosus (Schneider, 1845)
- Onychogomphus forcipatus (Linnaeus, 1758) – Small Pincertail
- Onychogomphus grammicus (Rambur, 1842)
- Onychogomphus kerri Fraser, 1933
- Onychogomphus kitchingmani Pinhey, 1961
- Onychogomphus lefebvrii (Rambur, 1842) – Pale Pincertail
- Onychogomphus maclachlani Selys, 1894
- Onychogomphus macrodon Selys, 1887 – Levant Pincertail
- Onychogomphus maculivertex (Selys, 1891)
- Onychogomphus malabarensis (Fraser, 1924)
- Onychogomphus meghalayanus Lahiri, 1987
- Onychogomphus nigrescens Pinhey, 1952
- Onychogomphus nilgiriensis Fraser, 1922
- Onychogomphus perplexus Lieftinck, 1935
- Onychogomphus pilosus (Martin, 1911)
- Onychogomphus pollux Lieftinck, 1941
- Onychogomphus rappardi Lieftinck, 1937
- Onychogomphus ridens Needham, 1930
- Onychogomphus risi (Fraser, 1922)
- Onychogomphus rossi Pinhey, 1966
- Onychogomphus saundersii Selys, 1854
- Onychogomphus schmidti Fraser, 1937
- Onychogomphus serrulatus Baumann, 1898
- Onychogomphus seydeli (Schouteden, 1934)
- Onychogomphus styx Pinhey, 1961
- Onychogomphus supinus Selys, 1854 – Gorge Claspertail
- Onychogomphus thienemanni Schmidt, 1934
- Onychogomphus treadawayi Müller & Hämäläinen, 1993
- Onychogomphus uncatus (Charpentier, 1840) – Large Pincertail
- Onychogomphus vadoni Paulian, 1961
- Onychogomphus viridicostus (Oguma, 1926)
