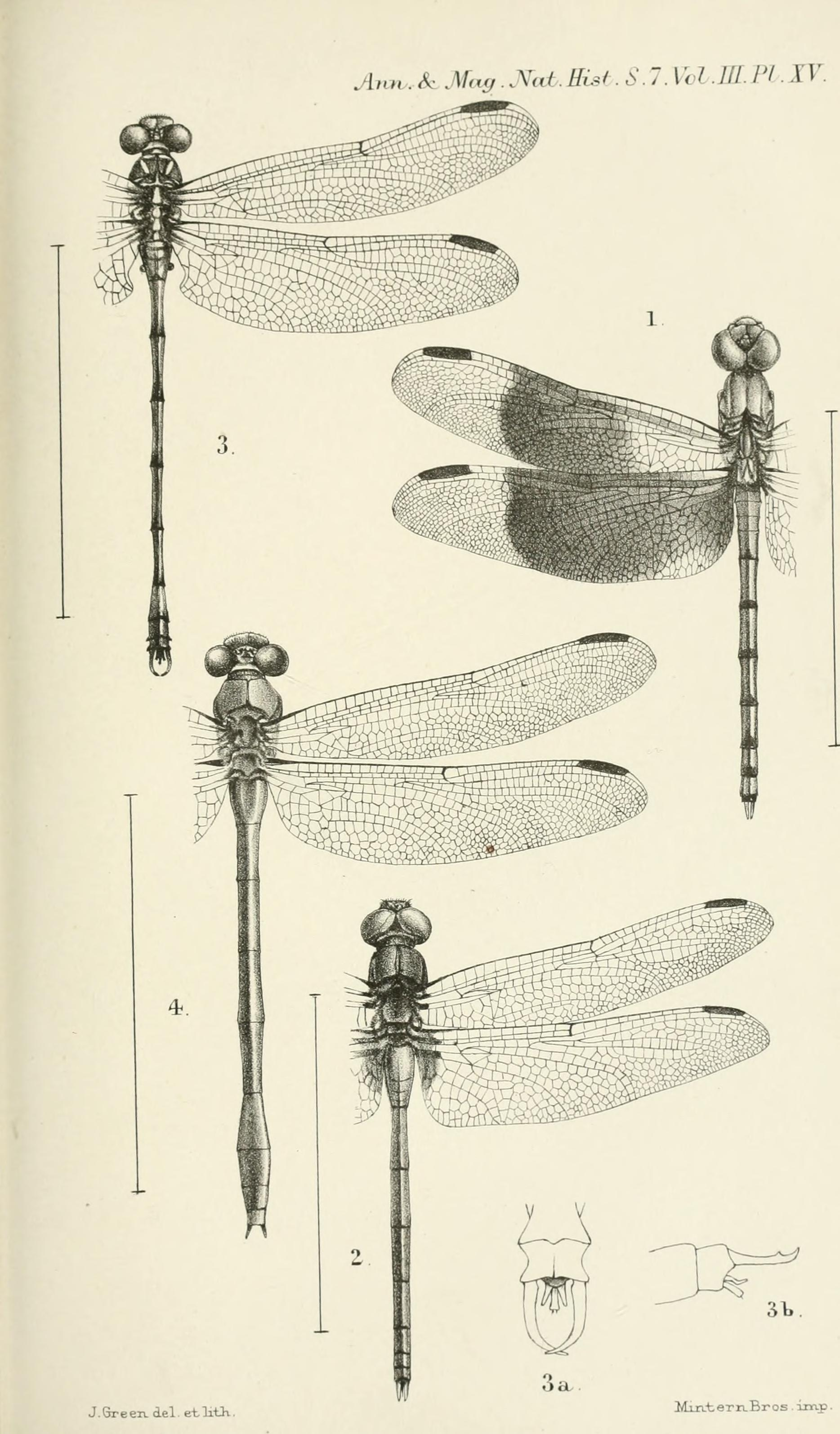

Scientific classification
- Domain: Eukaryota
- Kingdom: Animalia
- Phylum: Arthropoda
- Class: Insecta
- Order: Odonata
- Infraorder: Anisoptera
- Family: Gomphidae
- Genus: Phyllogomphoides
- Species: P. appendiculatus

Binomial name
- Phyllogomphoides appendiculatus (Kirby, 1899)

Synonyms
- Gomphoides appendiculatus

= Phyllogomphoides appendiculatus =

Species of dragonfly

Phyllogomphoides appendiculatus is a species of dragonfly in the family Gomphidae. It is found in Panama.

== Description ==
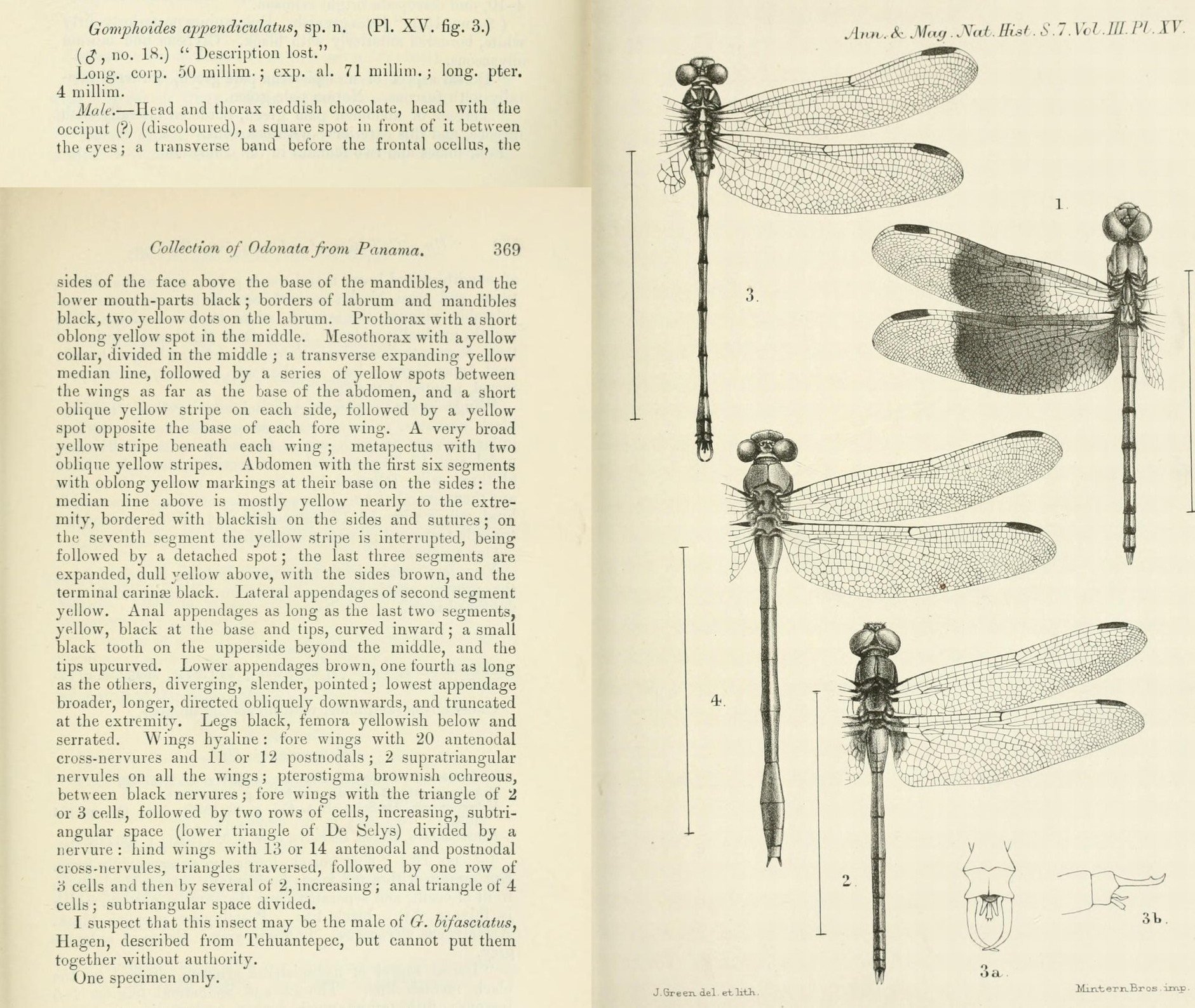
The original description of Phyllogomphoides appendiculatus by W.F. Kirby in 1899
