= Phyllogomphoides insignatus =

Scientific classification
- Domain: Eukaryota
- Kingdom: Animalia
- Phylum: Arthropoda
- Class: Insecta
- Order: Odonata
- Infraorder: Anisoptera
- Family: Gomphidae
- Genus: Phyllogomphoides
- Species: P. insignatus

Binomial name
- Phyllogomphoides insignatus Donnelly, 1979

Species of dragonfly

Phyllogomphoides insignatus is a species of dragonfly within the genus Phyllogomphoides. It is commonly known as dark-shouldered leaftail. It was first described by Donnelly in 1979, and is found in Panama. This species was formerly only known from this description until the first photo of a living individual was taken and uploaded by an amateur naturalist to iNaturalist in 2019, where it was confirmed by experts to be insignatus.
