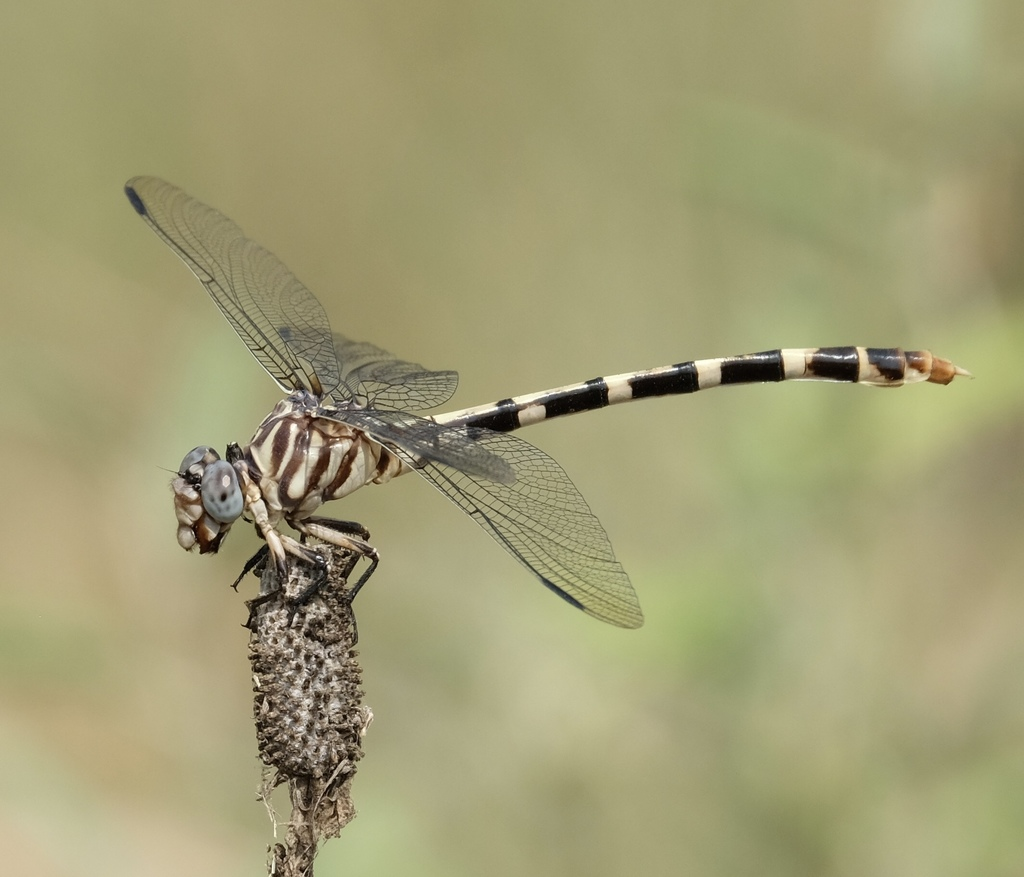

Conservation status
- Least Concern (IUCN 3.1)

Scientific classification
- Kingdom: Animalia
- Phylum: Arthropoda
- Class: Insecta
- Order: Odonata
- Infraorder: Anisoptera
- Family: Gomphidae
- Genus: Phyllogomphoides
- Species: P. stigmatus

Binomial name
- Phyllogomphoides stigmatus (Say, 1840)

= Phyllogomphoides stigmatus =

Species of dragonfly

Phyllogomphoides stigmatus, the four-striped leaftail, is a species of clubtail in the dragonfly family Gomphidae. It is found in Central America and North America.

The IUCN conservation status of Phyllogomphoides stigmatus is "LC", least concern, with no immediate threat to the species' survival. The population is stable. The IUCN status was reviewed in 2017.
