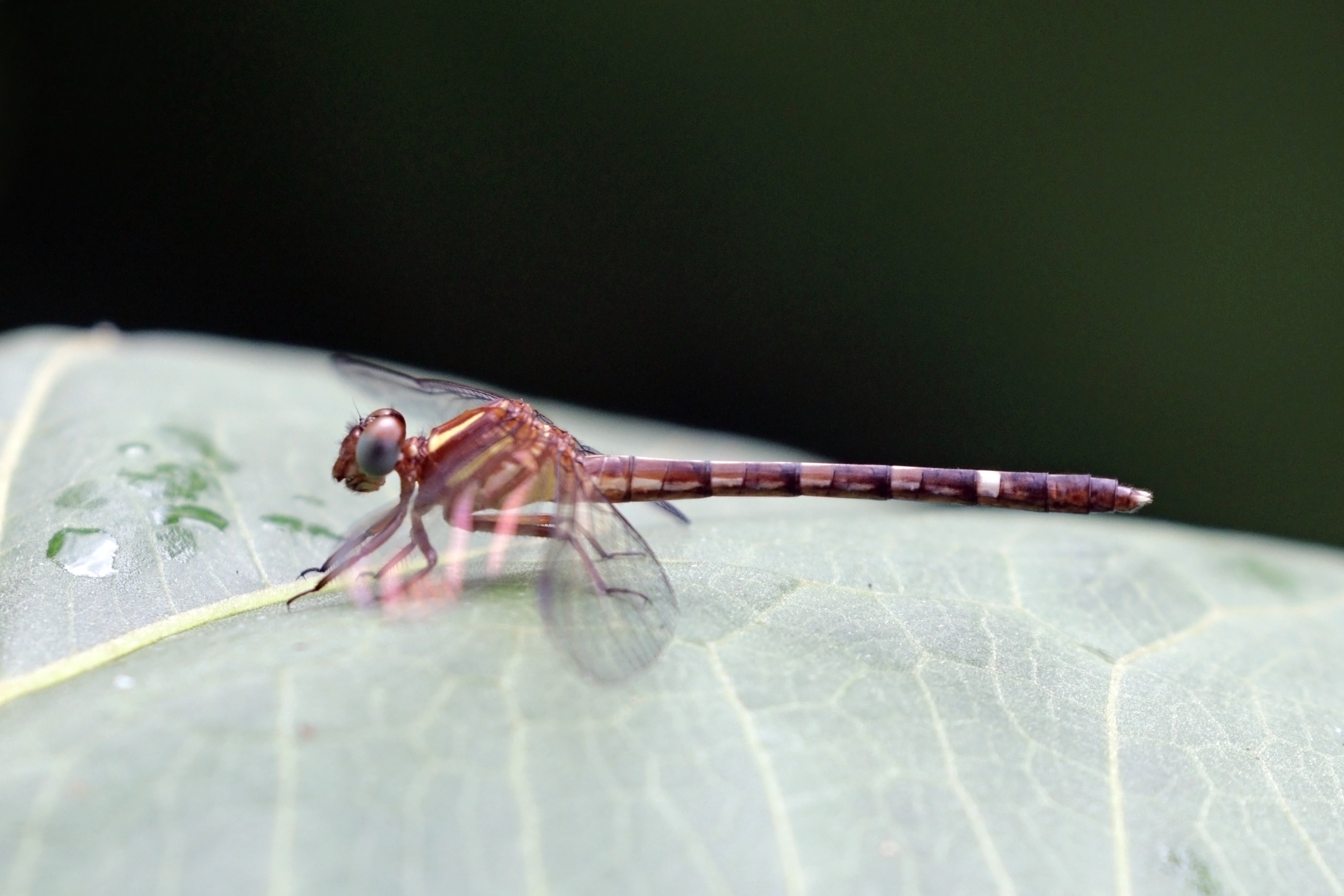
- Female, Panama

Scientific classification
- Kingdom: Animalia
- Phylum: Arthropoda
- Clade: Pancrustacea
- Class: Insecta
- Order: Odonata
- Infraorder: Anisoptera
- Family: Gomphidae
- Genus: Phyllogomphoides; Belle, 1970

= Phyllogomphoides =

Genus of dragonflies

Phyllogomphoides is a genus of dragonflies in the family Gomphidae. They are commonly known as leaftails. It contains the following species:

- Phyllogomphoides aculeus Belle, 1982
- Phyllogomphoides albrighti (Needham, 1950) - Five-striped Leaftail
- Phyllogomphoides andromeda (Selys, 1869)
- Phyllogomphoides angularis Belle, 1982
- Phyllogomphoides annectens (Selys, 1869)
- Phyllogomphoides apiculatus Cook & González, 1990
- Phyllogomphoides appendiculatus (Kirby, 1899)
- Phyllogomphoides atlanticus (Belle, 1970)
- Phyllogomphoides audax (Hagen in Selys, 1854)
- Phyllogomphoides bifasciatus (Hagen in Selys, 1878)
- Phyllogomphoides brunneus Belle, 1981
- Phyllogomphoides burgosi Brooks, 1989
- Phyllogomphoides calverti (Kirby, 1897)
- Phyllogomphoides camposi (Calvert, 1909)
- Phyllogomphoides cassiopeia (Belle, 1975)
- Phyllogomphoides cepheus Belle, 1980
- Phyllogomphoides cornutifrons (Needham, 1944)
- Phyllogomphoides cristatus (Needham, 1944)
- Phyllogomphoides danieli González & Novelo, 1990
- Phyllogomphoides duodentatus Donnelly, 1979
- Phyllogomphoides fuliginosus (Hagen in Selys, 1854)
- Phyllogomphoides imperator Belle, 1976
- Phyllogomphoides indicatrix Belle, 1989
- Phyllogomphoides insignatus Donnelly, 1979
- Phyllogomphoides joaquini Rodrigues, 1992
- Phyllogomphoides lieftincki (Belle, 1970)
- Phyllogomphoides litoralis Belle, 1984
- Phyllogomphoides luisi González & Novelo, 1988
- Phyllogomphoides major Belle, 1984
- Phyllogomphoides nayaritensis Belle, 1987
- Phyllogomphoides pacificus (Selys, 1873)
- Phyllogomphoides pedunculus Belle, 1984
- Phyllogomphoides praedatrix Belle, 1982
- Phyllogomphoides pseudangularis Belle, 1994
- Phyllogomphoides pseudoundulatus Belle, 1984
- Phyllogomphoides pugnifer Donnelly, 1979
- Phyllogomphoides regularis (Selys, 1873)
- Phyllogomphoides selysi (Navás, 1924)
- Phyllogomphoides semicircularis (Selys, 1854)
- Phyllogomphoides singularis Belle, 1979
- Phyllogomphoides spiniventris Belle, 1994
- Phyllogomphoides stigmatus (Say, 1840) - Four-striped Leaftail
- Phyllogomphoides suasillus Donnelly, 1979
- Phyllogomphoides suasus (Selys, 1859)
- Phyllogomphoides suspectus Belle, 1994
- Phyllogomphoides undulatus (Needham, 1944)
