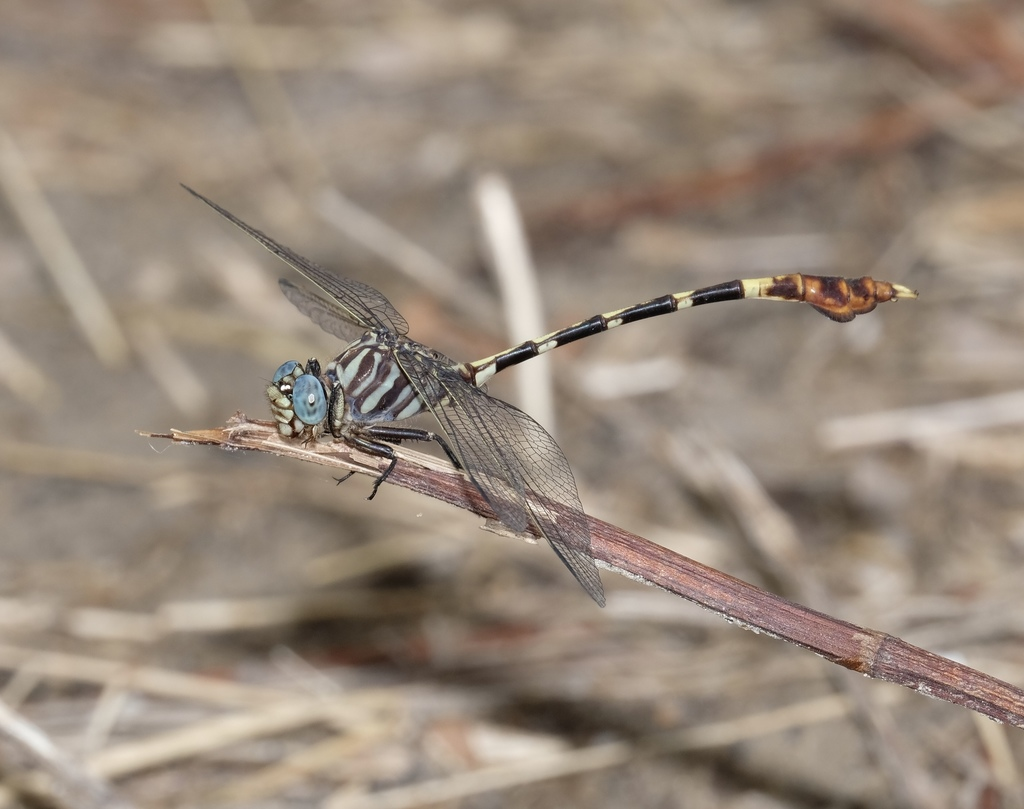

Conservation status
- Least Concern (IUCN 3.1)

Scientific classification
- Domain: Eukaryota
- Kingdom: Animalia
- Phylum: Arthropoda
- Class: Insecta
- Order: Odonata
- Infraorder: Anisoptera
- Family: Gomphidae
- Genus: Phyllogomphoides
- Species: P. albrighti

Binomial name
- Phyllogomphoides albrighti (Needham, 1950)

= Phyllogomphoides albrighti =

Species of dragonfly

Phyllogomphoides albrighti, the five-striped leaftail, is a species of clubtail in the family of dragonflies known as Gomphidae. It is found in Central America and North America.

The IUCN conservation status of Phyllogomphoides albrighti is "LC", least concern, with no immediate threat to the species' survival. The population is stable.
