= List of members of the Senate of Belgium, 2024–2029 =

The list of members of the Belgian Senate from 2024 to 2029.

In principle, the Senate consists of 50 state senators (29 Dutch-speaking, 20 French-speaking and 1 German-speaking) and 10 co-opted senators (6 Dutch-speaking and 4 French-speaking).

The legislature started on 18 July 2024 following the that year's federal election. The opening session of the Senate was chaired by Jean-Paul Wahl (MR), the oldest member in years, who was assisted in this task by the youngest senators, Liesa Scholzen (ProDG) and Nawal Maghroud (Vooruit), who acted as secretary.

== Composition ==
The composition is as follows:

- 29 senators appointed by the Flemish Parliament from the Flemish Parliament or from the Dutch language group of the Parliament of the Brussels-Capital Region
- 10 senators appointed by and from the Parliament of the French Community (which itself is composed of all members of the Walloon Parliament and some members of the French language group of the Parliament of the Brussels-Capital Region)
- 8 senators appointed by and from the Parliament of Wallonia
- 2 senators appointed by and from the French language group of the Brussels Capital Region Parliament
- 1 senator appointed by and from the Parliament of the German-speaking Community
- 6 senators, co-opted by the 29 Dutch-speaking senators (divided on the basis of the election results of the House of Representatives)
- 4 senators, co-opted by the 20 French-speaking senators (idem)

In total, the Senate in principle has 60 senators: 35 Dutch-speaking, 24 French-speaking and 1 German-speaking.

== Fractions ==
With the exception of the German-speaking state senator (elected by the Parliament of the German-speaking Community), the Senate seats are distributed among the parties on the basis of the election results for the state parliaments (for the state senators) and for the Chamber (for the co-opted senators). At the start of the legislature, the distribution among the parties is as follows:

| Fraction | State Senators | Co-opted | Total |
|---|---|---|---|
| N-VA | 8 | 2 | 10 |
| MR | 8 | 1 | 9 |
| Vlaams Belang | 7 | 1 | 8 |
| PS | 5 | 1 | 6 |
| PVDA-PTB | 5 | 1 | 6 |
| Les Engagés | 4 | 1 | 5 |
| CD&V | 4 | 1 | 5 |
| Vooruit | 4 | 1* | 5 |
| Open Vld | 2 | 1 | 3 |
| Ecolo-Groen | 3 | 0 | 3 |

- The Vooruit party initially decided not to fill its co-opted senatorial seat, to which it was entitled, because the party is in favour of abolishing the Senate. This left a total of only 59 senators until February 2026. In January, Vooruit reversed this decision and would appoint a co-opted senator to provide the crucial vote on the constitutional amendment to abolish the Senate.

== List of senators ==
| Senator | Party | Language group | Designation | Comments |
|---|---|---|---|---|
| Inge Brocken | N-VA | Dutch | Through and out of the Flemish Parliament | |
| An Capoen | N-VA | Dutch | Co-opted | |
| Arnout Coel | N-VA | Dutch | Through and out of the Flemish Parliament | |
| Koenraad Dillen | N-VA | Dutch | Through and out of the Flemish Parliament | |
| Andries Gryffroy | N-VA | Dutch | Through and out of the Flemish Parliament | Vice-chairman. |
| Sander Loones | N-VA | Dutch | Through and out of the Flemish Parliament | |
| Andy Pieters | N-VA | Dutch | Through and out of the Flemish Parliament | |
| Nadia Sminate | N-VA | Dutch | Through and out of the Flemish Parliament | |
| Karl Vanlouwe | N-VA | Dutch | Through and out of the Flemish Parliament | Chairman of the N-VA faction. |
| Gilles Verstraeten | N-VA | Dutch | Co-opted | Bureau member. |
| Valérie De Bue | MR | French | Through and out of the Walloon Parliament | President of the Senate from 25 July 2024. |
| Philippe Dodrimont | MR | French | Through and out of the Walloon Parliament | |
| Anne Charlotte d'Ursel | MR | French | By and from the French language group of the Brussels Capital Region Parliament | |
| Marie-Christine Marghem | MR | French | By and from the Parliament of the French Community | |
| Viviane Teitelbaum | MR | French | Co-opted | |
| Stéphanie Thoron | MR | French | Through and out of the Walloon Parliament | |
| Gaëtan Van Goidsenhoven | MR | French | By and from the Parliament of the French Community | Chairman of the MR faction. |
| Jean-Paul Wahl | MR | French | By and from the Parliament of the French Community | |
| Liesa Scholzen | ProDG | German | By and from the Parliament of the German-speaking Community | ProDG forms a technical faction with the MR. |
| Yves Buysse | Vlaams Belang | Dutch | Through and out of the Flemish Parliament | Vice-chairman. |
| Bob De Brabandere | Vlaams Belang | Dutch | By the Flemish Parliament from the Dutch language group of the Brussels Capital Region Parliament | |
| Johan Deckmyn | Vlaams Belang | Dutch | Through and out of the Flemish Parliament | |
| Ilse Malfroot | Vlaams Belang | Dutch | Through and out of the Flemish Parliament | |
| Klaas Slootmans | Vlaams Belang | Dutch | Through and out of the Flemish Parliament | Chairman of the Vlaams Belang faction from 25 July 2024. |
| Anke Van dermeersch | Vlaams Belang | Dutch | Through and out of the Flemish Parliament | |
| Wim Verheyden | Vlaams Belang | Dutch | Through and out of the Flemish Parliament | |
| Hans Verreyt | Vlaams Belang | Dutch | Co-opted | |
| Malik Ben Achour | PS | French | Co-opted | Bureau member. |
| Nadia El Yousfi | PS | French | By and from the Parliament of the French Community | |
| Hasan Koyuncu | PS | French | By and from the French language group of the Brussels Capital Region Parliament | |
| Anne Lambelin | PS | French | Through and out of the Walloon Parliament | Chairman of the PS faction from 25 July 2024. |
| Özlem Özen | PS | French | By and from the Parliament of the French Community | |
| Thierry Witsel | PS | French | Through and out of the Walloon Parliament | |
| Jamila Ammi | PVDA-PTB | French | Through and out of the Walloon Parliament | |
| Alice Bernard | PVDA-PTB | French | By and from the Parliament of the French Community | Chairman of the PVDA-PTB faction from 25 July 2024. |
| Debby Burssens | PVDA-PTB | Dutch | Through and out of the Flemish Parliament | |
| Antonio Cocciolo | PVDA-PTB | French | Co-opted | |
| Raf Van Gestel | PVDA-PTB | Dutch | Through and out of the Flemish Parliament | |
| Patricia Van Walle | PVDA-PTB | French | By and from the Parliament of the French Community | |
| Vincent Blondel | Les Engagés | French | Through and out of the Walloon Parliament | |
| Caroline Desalle | Les Engagés | French | By and from the Parliament of the French Community | |
| Moussa Diallo Elhadj | Les Engagés | French | By the Parliament of the French Community from the French language group of the Brussels Capital Region Parliament | |
| Anne-Catherine Goffinet | Les Engagés | French | Through and out of the Walloon Parliament | From 25 July 2024, president of the Les Engagés faction. |
| Marie-Claire Mvumbi | Les Engagés | French | Co-opted | |
| Benjamin Dalle | CD&V | Dutch | By the Flemish Parliament from the Dutch language group of the Brussels Capital Region Parliament | Chairman of the CD&V faction from 25 July 2024. |
| Bianca Debaets | CD&V | Dutch | Co-opted | |
| Stijn De Roo | CD&V | Dutch | Through and out of the Flemish Parliament | |
| Joke Schauvliege | CD&V | Dutch | Through and out of the Flemish Parliament | |
| Peter Van Rompuy | CD&V | Dutch | Through and out of the Flemish Parliament | |
| Nawal Maghroud | Vooruit | Dutch | Through and out of the Flemish Parliament | |
| Mauro Michielsen | Vooruit | Dutch | Co-opted | Youngest-ever Belgian senator. |
| Burak Nalli | Vooruit | Dutch | Through and out of the Flemish Parliament | |
| Kelly Van Tendeloo | Vooruit | Dutch | Through and out of the Flemish Parliament | |
| Kris Verduyckt | Vooruit | Dutch | Through and out of the Flemish Parliament | Chairman of the Vooruit faction from 25 July 2024. |
| Stephanie D'Hose | Open Vld | Dutch | Through and out of the Flemish Parliament | Chairman of the Open Vld faction from 25 July 2024. |
| Goedele Liekens | Open Vld | Dutch | Co-opted | |
| Tom Ongena | Open Vld | Dutch | Through and out of the Flemish Parliament | |
| Fourat Ben Chikha | Groen | Dutch | Through and out of the Flemish Parliament | |
| Celia Groothedde | Groen | Dutch | By the Flemish Parliament from the Dutch language group of the Brussels Capital Region Parliament | Chairman of the Ecolo-Groen faction from 25 July 2024. |
| Hajib El Hajjaji | Ecolo | French | By and from the Parliament of the French Community | |
