= Mvimbi (surname) =

Mvimbi is a South African surname that may refer to

- Lulama Mvimbi is a South African politician
- Samkelo Mvimbi (b. 1999) is a South African field hockey player
- Owen Mvimbi (b. 1988) is a South African field hockey player

== See also ==
- Albert Luthuli also known by his Zulu name Mvumbi
- Marie-Claire Mvumbi (born 1978), Congo-born Belgian politician
