= List of vice-presidents of the Senate (Belgium) =

The Belgian Senate has a first vice-president and a second vice-president assisting the president of the Senate.

Name	Party	Entered office	Left office
Senate fully equal to the Chamber of Representatives
Philippe Count Vilain XIIII	Catholic	1831	1848
Philippe Count d'Arschot Schoonhoven	?	1836	1839
François-Jean Wyns de Raucourt	Liberal	1841	1846
François-Joseph Dindal	Liberal	1848	1851
Jean Baptiste Julien d'Omalius d'Halloy	Catholic	1848	1870
Camille Baron de Tornaco	Liberal	1863	1879
Edmond Baron de Sélys Longchamps	Liberal	1879	1880
Hippolyte Baron della Faille d'Huysse	Catholic	1870	1874
Émile Dupont	Liberal	1892	1912
Arnold Count t'Kint de Roodenbeke	Catholic	1911	1922
Léon Colleaux	Labour	1918	1919
Édouard Descamps	Catholic	1922	1932
Albert Baron d'Huart	Catholic	1932	1936
Eugène Soudan	Labour	1936	1939
Auguste Buisseret	Liberal	1947	1949
Georges Gramme	Christian Social	1977	1978
Georges Gramme	Christian Social	1980	1985
Jan Bascour	Freedom and Progress	1982	1985
Fred Erdman	Socialist	1988	1992
Senate quasi-equal to the Chamber of Representatives
Philippe Mahoux	Socialist	1995	1999
Jean-Marie Happart	Socialist	1999	2003
Jurgen Ceder	Vlaams Belang	2004	2007
Senate as reflection platform with very limited power
Willy Demeyer	Socialist	2014	2017
Andries Gryffroy	New Flemish Alliance	2019	Incumbent
Fourat Ben Chikha	Groen	2020	Incumbent

== See also ==
- Belgian Senate
- List of presidents of the Belgian Senate
- Politics of Belgium
