= Michielsen =

Michielsen is a surname. Notable people with the surname include:

- Aloïs Michielsen (born 1942), Belgian businessman
- Jilke Michielsen (2007–2026), Belgian racing cyclist
- Marion Michielsen (born 1985), Dutch contract bridge player
- Mauro Michielsen (born 2005), Belgian politician
