= Arrest and Imprisonment of Esila Ayık =

Esila Ayık is a university student who was arrested in 2025 on charges of insulting the president for carrying a placard that read "Diktatör Erdoğan" (English: Dictator Erdogan) during a protest in Kadıköy, Istanbul. Ayık stated that the placard did not belong to her and that she had taken it from someone she didn’t know in order to take a photo with it. The incident sparked public outcry and ignited discussions about freedom of speech.

Esila Ayık was arrested on April 9 and sent to the Bakırköy Women's Closed Prison. Her lawyer stated that she suffers from chronic heart and kidney conditions, that the prison environment is unsuitable for her health, and that Ayık was hospitalized on April 23 after falling ill in prison. The lawyer also noted that her imprisonment continued despite a report from the Istanbul Chamber of Doctors stating that she was unfit to remain in prison.

An assessment of the issue in Ayık’s heart valve, previously classified as “mild,” found that it had progressed to a “moderate” level, and new problems were also diagnosed in her aorta. She also received a medical report from her doctor in Belgium stating that she was unfit for prison conditions.

At a hearing on May 15, 2025, Esila Ayık and two other students were released from prison.

== Background ==
On April 8, 2025, during the "Youth Solidarity Concert" held in Kadıköy, 22-year-old Esila Ayık, a student at the Royal Academy of Fine Arts, in Ghent, Belgium, and two other students were detained and subsequently arrested for carrying placards that read "Diktatör Erdoğan." According to statements from Ayık’s family and friends, her home was police raided around 2:00 a.m., and she was taken to Vatan Police Headquarters by plainclothes officers. In the indictment prepared by the Anadolu Chief Public Prosecutor's Office, the three students were charged with "openly insulting the president," with a prison sentence of up to 4 years and 8 months being sought.

Regarding prison conditions, it was reported by Ayık’s family and lawyer that the clothes they brought for her were not delivered, and she was only able to attend visits wearing pajamas. It was alleged that the guards mocked Ayık by saying, “If you knew how to dress, you wouldn’t be here in the first place.” Additionally, her ward was reportedly housing 47 people, with only two bathrooms—one of which was out of order. There were also reported difficulties in accessing hygiene products. Ayık stated that the guards treated her as if she were a criminal, that she was only treated well during visits by members of parliament, and that conditions returned to their previous state once the visits ended.

=== Legal process ===
The hearing held on May 15, 2025, at the 77th Criminal Court of First Instance in Kartal began with a 2.5-hour delay due to the late transfer of the detained students from prison. The area around the courtroom was barricaded, and lawyers, journalists, and observers were not allowed inside. Only one lawyer from the Istanbul Bar Association and one journalist each from Anadolu Agency and ANKA News Agency were permitted entry. The prosecutor requested the continuation of the detention. At the end of the hearing, a release order was issued for Ayık and the two other students, who had been in custody since April 9.

=== Esila Ayık's defence and release ===
In her defense during the hearing, Esila Ayık stated that she was studying photography in Belgium and had attended the concert to take photographs. She explained that she took the placard from someone she did not know and held it for less than five minutes solely to take a photo. She emphasized that she had no intention of committing a crime and did not accept the charges.

Following the hearing on May 15, after which Esila Ayık was released, the administrators of the Royal Academy of Fine Arts, where she is enrolled, announced that they would make arrangements to ensure she can complete the academic year.

== National and international reactions ==
Esila Ayık’s arrest sparked widespread reactions both nationally and internationally from civil society organizations, political parties, and the broader public.

Belgian Foreign Minister Maxime Prévot, Ghent Mayor Mathias De Clercq, and ruling party MP Axel Ronse raised Esila Ayık’s arrest as an issue in the European Union and the European Parliament.

Additionally, De Clercq described Ayık’s arrest as “unacceptable” and has contacted the EU Commissioner for Justice and Democracy as well as the Turkish Ambassador to Belgium. The Ghent Mayor stated that more diplomatic pressure is needed for Ayık’s release and pledged to do everything in his power to secure her freedom.

On May 7, 2025, the European Parliament expressed its concerns about Esila Ayık’s arrest in its Turkey report. The report voiced deep concern over Ayık’s “unlawful detention” and highlighted her heart and kidney conditions. The Parliament called on Turkish authorities to release all individuals detained for exercising their fundamental rights and to drop the charges against them.

The president of the Istanbul branch of the CHP, Özgür Çelik, stated that his requests to meet with Esila Ayık were denied by the authorities and criticized Minister of Justice Yılmaz Tunç on social media.

On May 15, Özgür Çelik and members of the CHP’s Legal Commission went to the courthouse to follow the hearing and stated in their press release before the hearing that the arrests were unlawful.

== See also ==
- Human rights in Turkey
- 2025 Turkish protests
