= 7 Aban Front =

Iranian political and opposition organization

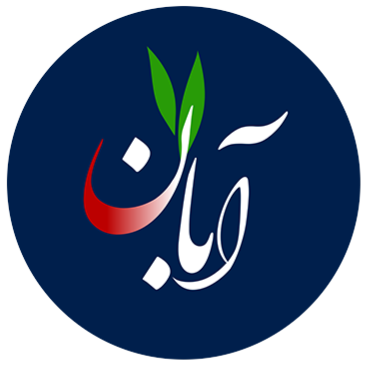
- Formation: 29 October 2022; 3 years ago
- Founder: Saeed Bashirtash
- Type: Political organization
- Headquarters: Brussels, Belgium
- Region served: Iran
- Official language: Persian
- Chairman: Saeed Bashirtash
- Website: 7aban.org

The 7 Aban Front (Persian: جبهه هفت آبان Jebhe-ye Haft-e Ābān) is a political organization established in 2022 in opposition to the government of Islamic Republic of Iran.

== Founding ==
The group was established in Brussels following the death of Mahsa Amini and during the Woman, Life, Freedom movement. It brought together dozens of dissidents, including constitutional monarchists as well as republicans with patriotic and liberal-democratic leanings. The 7 Aban Front is one of the main opposition groups to the Islamic Republic.

=== Name and symbolism ===
The organization takes its name from 7 Aban in the Persian calendar (around 29 October of the Gregorian calendar) or Cyrus the Great Day. The date is associated with the entry of Cyrus the Great into Babylon, the liberation of Jewish captives, and the proclamation often described as the world's first charter of human rights known as the Cyrus Cylinder. The organization was deliberately established on 7 Aban 2022 to highlight the symbolic weight of that date.

== Leadership and political activities ==
The chairman of the 7 Aban Front, Saeed Bashirtash, has consistently argued against the involvement of religion in government.

=== Brussels Conference (2025) ===
On 14 June 2025, the 7 Aban Front organized a conference in Brussels. Uri Rosenthal, former Minister of Foreign Affairs of the Netherlands from the VVD, expressed support for the coalition of liberals and social democrats within the organization. Theo Francken, a Belgian politician from N-VA and Belgium's Defence and Foreign Trade minister, also participated. State media affiliated with the Islamic Revolutionary Guard Corps described the conference as "a plot to overthrow the Islamic Republic."

=== Speech at European Parliament (2025) ===
In March 2025, Saeed Bashirtash delivered a speech at the European Parliament in his capacity as Head of the Central Council of the 7 Aban Front.

=== Diplomatic letters (2025) ===
In November 2025, the 7 Aban Front sent a letter to Donald Trump, President of the United States, and a separate letter to Emmanuel Macron, President of France, calling for the designation of the Islamic Revolutionary Guard Corps as a terrorist organization by the European Union.
