= Patzelt =

Patzelt is a surname. Notable people with the surname include:

- Heinz Patzelt (born 1957), Austrian lawyer
- Karl Patzelt (1893–1918), Austro-Hungarian flying ace
- Martin Patzelt (born 1947), German politician
