= Saeed Bashirtash =

Iranian politician; dentist and implant surgeon

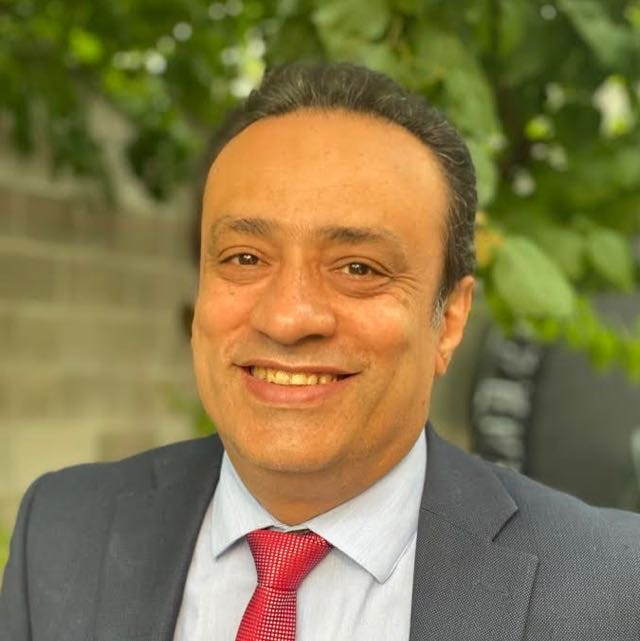
- Born: 26 December 1965 (age 60); Tehran, Iran
- Education: Université libre de Bruxelles (DDS)
- Political party: The 7 Aban Front
- Spouse: Darya Safai (m. 1997)
- Children: 2

Saeed Bashirtash (Persian: سعید بشیرتاش; born 26 December 1965) is an Iranian politician, dentist and implant surgeon who lives in Brussels, Belgium. He is an activist in opposition to the Islamic Republic of Iran system of government. He leads the 7 Aban Front, a political group opposing the government.

In 1996, he became the chief organizer of The Youth Organization of the Party of the Iranian Nation (Persian: سازمان جوانان حزب ملت ایران), a group of activists within the Party of the Iranian Nation, working closely with his close friends, Parvaneh Eskandari, and Dariush Forouhar, the founder of the Party of the Iranian Nation. Forouhar and Eskandari were victims of the 1988–98 chain murders of Iran.

== Early life ==
Saeed Bashirtash was born in Tehran in 1965. After the Iranian revolution, when he turned 19, he moved to Belgium to pursue a degree in dentistry. After returning to Iran, he focused on his work as a political activist with the Youth Organization of the Party of the Iranian Nation, while allegedly he continued his dental practice, pro bono, in the poorer neighbourhoods of Iran.

== Life in exile ==
After escaping to Belgium through Turkey, Bashirtash began working independently of the Party of the Iranian Nation to overthrow the Government of Iran. He wrote numerous articles for the opposition, and took to public speaking, most notably RoubeRou (Manoto), RadioFreeEurope/RadioLiberty, and Voice of America. In 2018, he founded Shahrivar (شهریور), a Persian-language political and theoretical quarterly journal of the Iranian diaspora, which publishes contributions from Iranian scholars, intellectuals, and analysts across Europe and North America. The journal, issued from Brussels, serves as a platform for secular and liberal political thought within the Iranian diaspora community.

In October 2022, at the height of the Women, Life, Freedom Movement, Saeed Bashirtash organized a meeting of dozens of prominent Iranian opposition activists in Brussels, during which he founded the 7 Aban Front. He has led the group ever since. Composed of pro-democracy and nationalist activists, the 7 Aban Front firmly opposes any religious interference in politics.

According to an interview published by the French magazine Atlantico in February 2026, the 7 Aban Front was founded by around forty Iranian political activists and intellectuals during the Women, Life, Freedom movement. Bashirtash said that the organisation seeks to establish a secular liberal democracy in Iran, has representatives in several countries, and maintains its principal support base inside Iran.

In March 2026, Euronews reported that Bashirtash and the 7 Aban Front had been invited to participate in a European Parliament debate on the situation in Iran organised by the Parliament's Committee on Foreign Affairs. The invitation was subsequently confirmed by the European Parliament, and on 15 April 2026 Bashirtash addressed members of the European Parliament during the committee meeting, which was streamed live by the Parliament.

In addition to his political activism, Saeed also operates three dental clinics in Belgium with his wife Darya Safai.

According to De Morgen, an investigation into a possible scandal involving Bashirtash and his wife Darya Safai was requested by Belgium Secretary of State for Asylum Sammy Mahdi. The Belgian federal prosecutor's office found no evidence of criminal offences.

== Political views ==
During the European Parliament debate in April 2026, Bashirtash argued that Reza Pahlavi should be invited by the European Parliament as "the leader of Iran's national revolution" rather than as the leader of a political group. He also stated that Western governments should not determine Iran's future political leadership, arguing instead that they should support democratic principles while leaving the choice of leaders to the Iranian people.
