= Koen Dillen =

Belgian politician (born 1962)

Member of the Flemish Parliament
- Incumbent
- Assumed office 9 June 2024

Member of the Belgian Senate
- Incumbent
- Assumed office 9 June 2024

Personal details
- Born: 29 July 1962 (age 63) Mol, Belgium
- Party: New Flemish Alliance; Volksunie (before 2001)

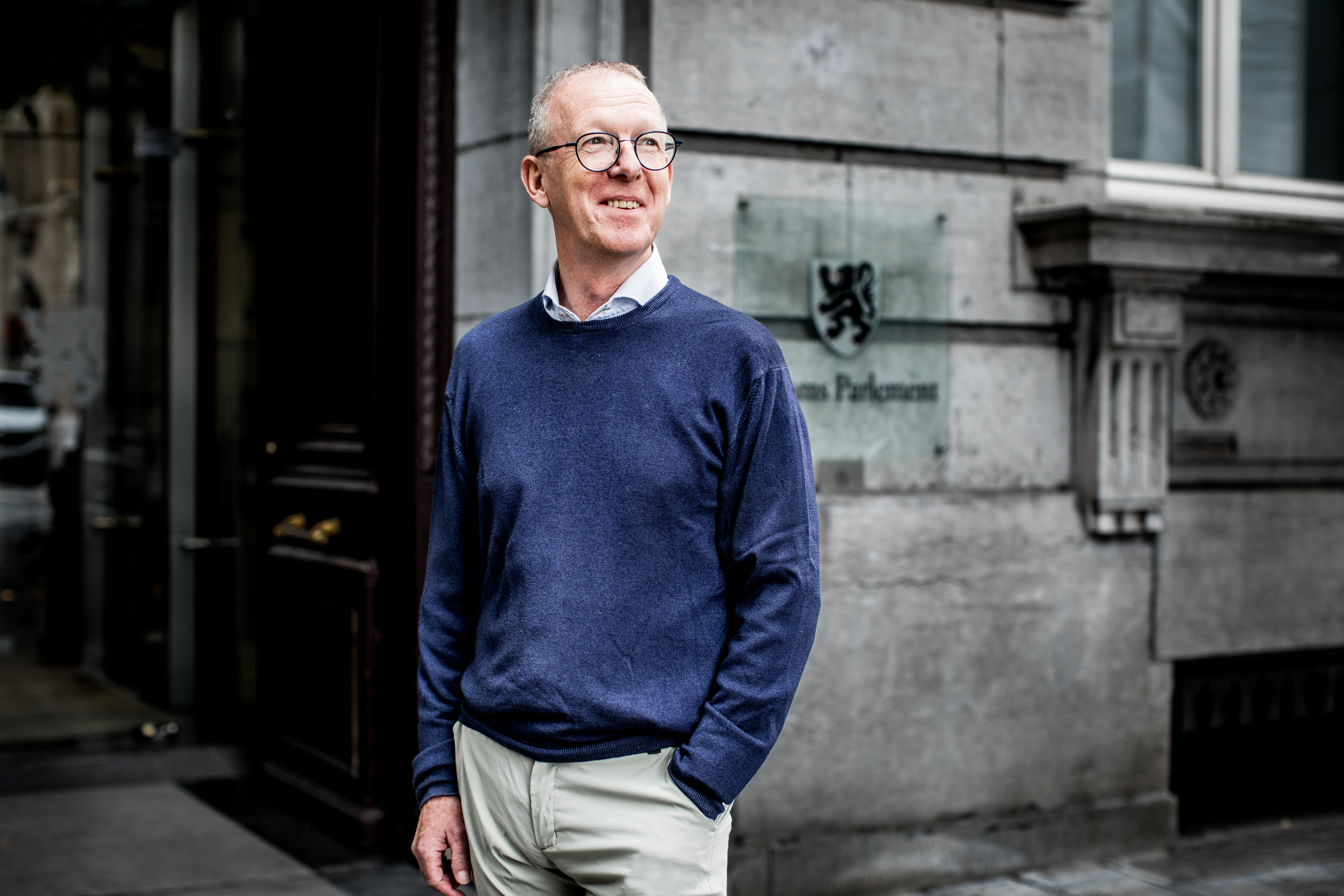
Koen Dillen

Koen Dillen (born July 29, 1962, in Mol) is a Belgian physician and politician of the New Flemish Alliance (N-VA) party who has served as a Member of the Flemish Parliament for the Antwerp constituency and the Belgian Senate since 2024.

== Biography ==
Dillen was born in 1962. His father was a representative and councilor for the Volksunie party in Balen. He graduated as a general practitioner at the Catholic University of Leuven in 1988 before training as a physician for disabled patients at the University of Antwerp. He then worked as a public general practitioner in Mol and as a physician at a mental hospital. Dillen is a member of the Antwerp chapter of the Domus Medica organization.

After being a member of the Volksunie as a teenager, Dillen joined the New Flemish Alliance in 2008. He was elected as a provincial councilor in 2012 for the N-VA in Antwerp and was a municipal councilor in Mol from 2012 to 2024. In the provincial council he was chairman of the Welfare Committee from 2018 to 2024. During the 2024 Belgian regional elections, Dillen was elected to the Flemish Parliament for the Antwerp list and was designated as a community senator in the Belgian Senate.
