= European Alliance =

Political group in the European Union assembly

European Alliance group in the European Committee of the Regions
- President: Nanette Maupertuis
- Founded: 1996
- Ideology: Centrism; Regionalism; Minorities; Independent Politics
- European Committee of the Regions: 17 / 329

Website
- http://www.ea.cor.europa.eu

The European Alliance (EA) is a political group in the European Committee of the Regions composed of a mix of regionalist parties and independent members. It was established in 1996, with strong influence of the European Free Alliance, and has since then existed in several incarnations.

Currently, the group gathers 31 local and regional politicians from the following Member States: Belgium, France, Ireland, Lithuania, Netherlands, Poland, Romania, and Spain.

== History ==
Since its foundation in 1996 until 2004, the European Alliance group consisted of the European Free Alliance's member parties aligned with a group of independents and the then-governing party of Ireland, Fianna Fáil, thus serving as a relatively loose grouping of regionalist and non-regionalist members of the European Committee of the Regions. The group's main founding principles included:

- Support for an open Europe of regions and nations
- Support for highest possible standards for environmental protection, workers' health, consumer protection, veterinary rules, social welfare and democratic principles

In 2004 the group was reconstituted as "Union for Europe of the Nations – European Alliance (UEN–EA)", uniting a wide range of political options, from traditionally centrist parties to more national-conservative ones. At the time, the group was partly affiliated with the European Parliament's Union for Europe of the Nations.

In 2009, the group restored its original name and returned to its regionalist roots being reestablished in every new mandate since.

In 2021 after Brexit, the group suffered of a great member loss due to the depart of the Scottish and Welsh members which formed a big part of the group.

== Present ==
EA group currently gathers 31 members and alternates from Corsica, Flanders, Ireland, Lithuania, Navarra, Poland, and Romania.

== Political priorities ==
Apart from its regionalist affiliations, the group gathers a significant number of independent members active in the development of Europe's disadvantaged regions, particularly rural, mountainous and island areas. In addition, a strong focus is put on the promotion of green economy and the protection of Europe's cultural and linguistic diversity, especially regional identities.

Some of the group's main priorities include:

- Cohesive Union based on common responsibilities and solidarity
- Increased EU support for entrepreneurship, SMEs and social enterprises at a local and regional level
- Balanced development across all of EU's regions, particularly focused on narrowing the gaps between rich and poorer regions and ensuring an urban-rural balance.
- Investment in green growth and technologies aimed at enhancing a low carbon economy, improving energy efficiency and protecting the environment and natural resources
- Universal access to education
- Promotion of Europe's cultural and linguistic diversity, particularly of lesser used and regional languages
- Support for the principle of self-determination, including support for the EU's "internal enlargement", provided that it is achieved through a peaceful and democratic process
- Better European governance through a considerable improvement in the functioning, simplicity and transparency of the EU.

== Presidents ==
The current president of the group is Ms Nanette Maupertuis, President of the Corsican Assembly.

Previous presidents include:

Period	Name	Authority	Country
1998 – 2002	Seán Ó Neachtain	Galway County Council	Ireland
2002 – 2004	Annette McNamara	Cork County Council	Ireland
2004 – 2006	Keith Brown	Clackmannanshire Council	Scotland
2006 – 2007	Maria Corrigan	Dún Laoghaire–Rathdown County Council and Dublin Regional Authority	Ireland
2007 – 2010	Paul O' Donoghue	Kerry County Council	Ireland
2010 – 2012	Jerzy Zająkała	Mayor of Lubianka	Poland
2012 – 2015	Uno Silberg	Kose Municipality Council	Estonia
2015 – 2017	Stanisław Szwabski	Gdynia City Council	Poland
2017 – 2020	Karl Vanlouwe	Member of the Flemish Parliament	Flanders
2020 – 2022	Kieran McCarthy	Cork City Council	Ireland
2022 – 2025	Karl Vanlouwe	Member of the Flemish Parliament	Flanders
2025 –	Marie-Antoinette Maupertuis	President of the Corsican Assembly	Corsica
