= Moussa Diallo Elhadj =

Guinean-born Belgian politician

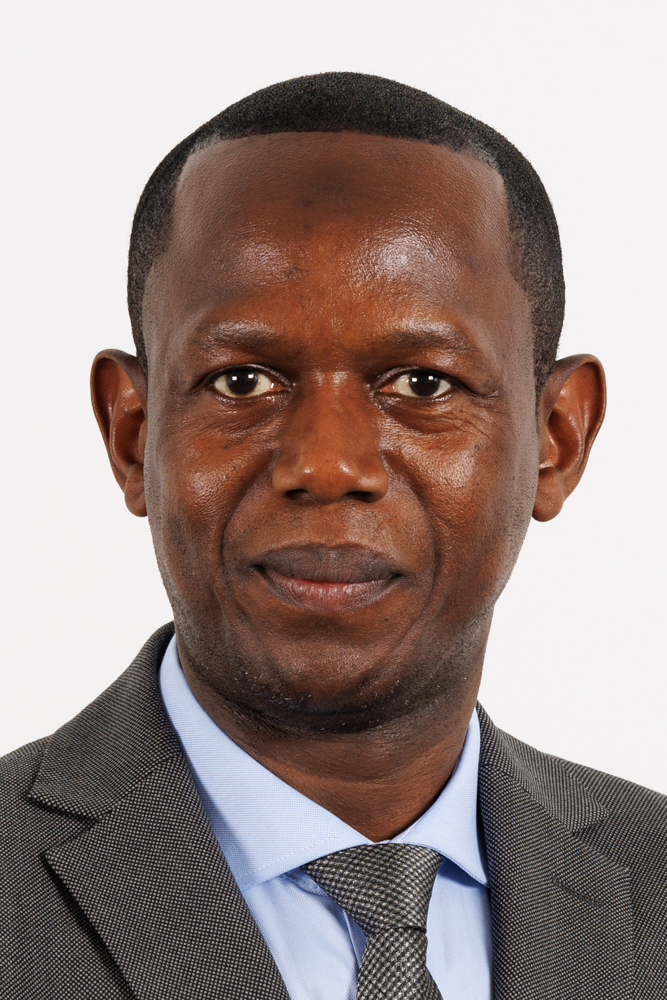
Elhadj Moussa Diallo

Moussa Diallo Elhadj (born 1 January 1976) is a Guinean-born Belgian politician. A French-speaking member of the Senate of Belgium from the Les Engagés party.

== Biography ==
He was born in the town of Gaoual in Guinea and eventually immigrated to Belgium. He is a graduate in management and has worked in the public sector in Brussels.

He was elected in the 2024 Belgian federal election.

== See also ==
- List of members of the Senate of Belgium, 2024–2029
