= Maaike De Vreese =

Belgian politician (born 1984)

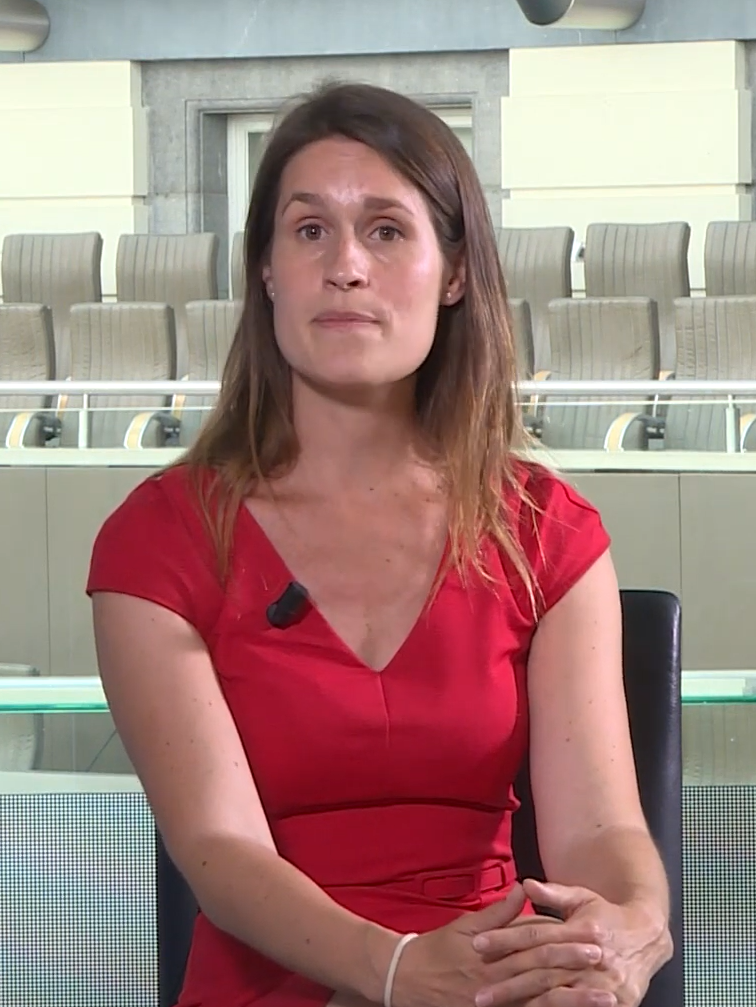

Member of the Flemish Parliament
- Incumbent
- Assumed office 2019

Senator
- Incumbent
- Assumed office 2019

Personal details
- Born: 26 July 1984 (age 41) Bruges
- Party: N-VA

Maaike De Vreese (born 26 July 1984 in Bruges) is a Belgian politician and civil servant active for the N-VA in the Flemish Parliament and the Belgian Senate.

== Biography ==
De Vreese holds a degree in criminology from Ghent University. In 2008 she started working at the Belgian Federal Public Service Immigration Affairs. In this role she advised the police on operational actions to prevent human smuggling and illegal immigration.

In the 2019 Belgian regional elections, De Vreese was elected from second place as a Flemish Member of Parliament on the list of the N-VA in the Constituency of West Flanders with 14,810 preference votes. To take up this mandate, she took political leave as a civil servant. She was also sent to the Senate as a state senator.
