= Heinz Patzelt =

Austrian lawyer (born 1957)

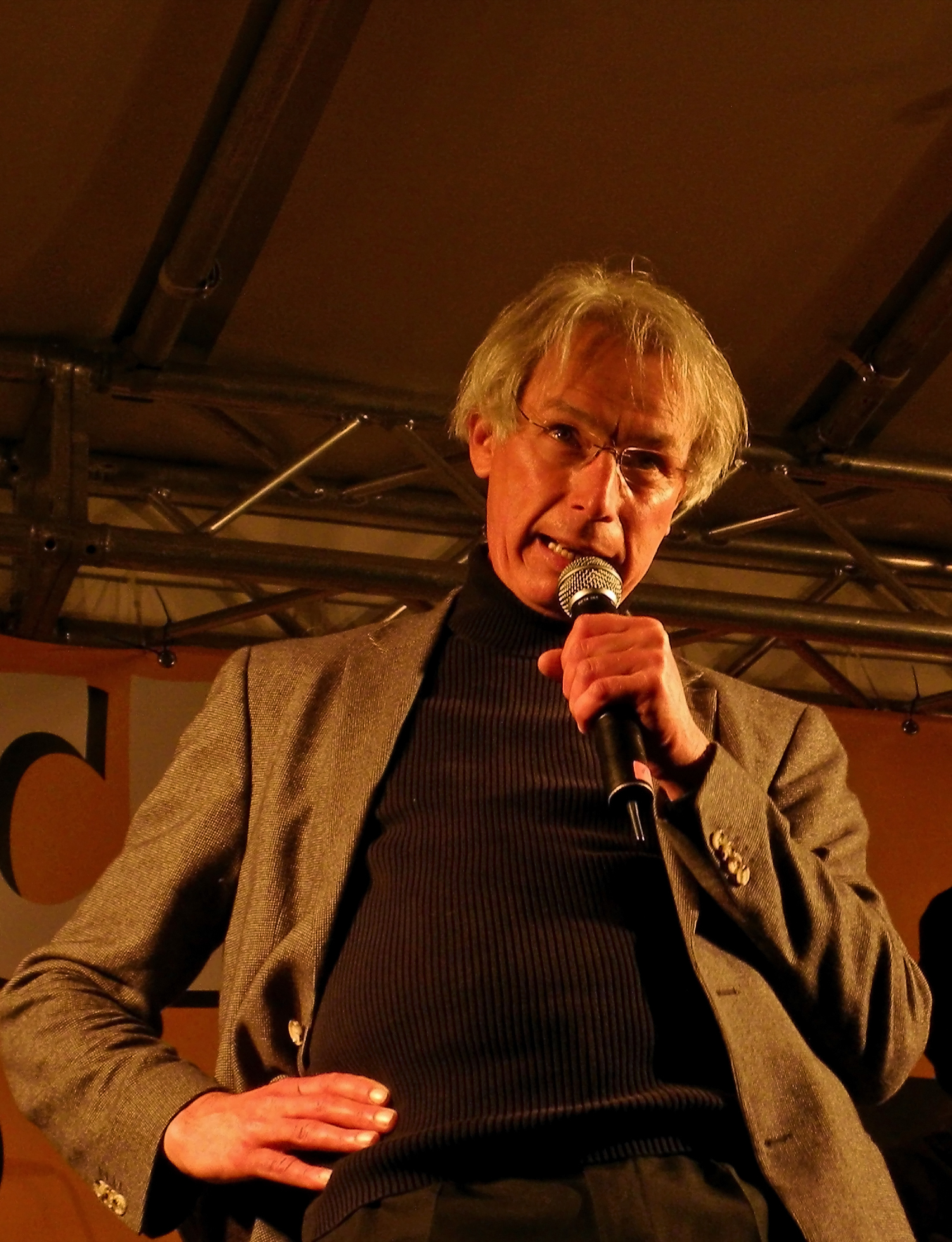
Heinz Patzelt (2011)

Heinz Patzelt (born 1957 in Vienna) is an Austrian lawyer. He has been the Secretary General of Amnesty International in Austria since 1998.

== Biography ==
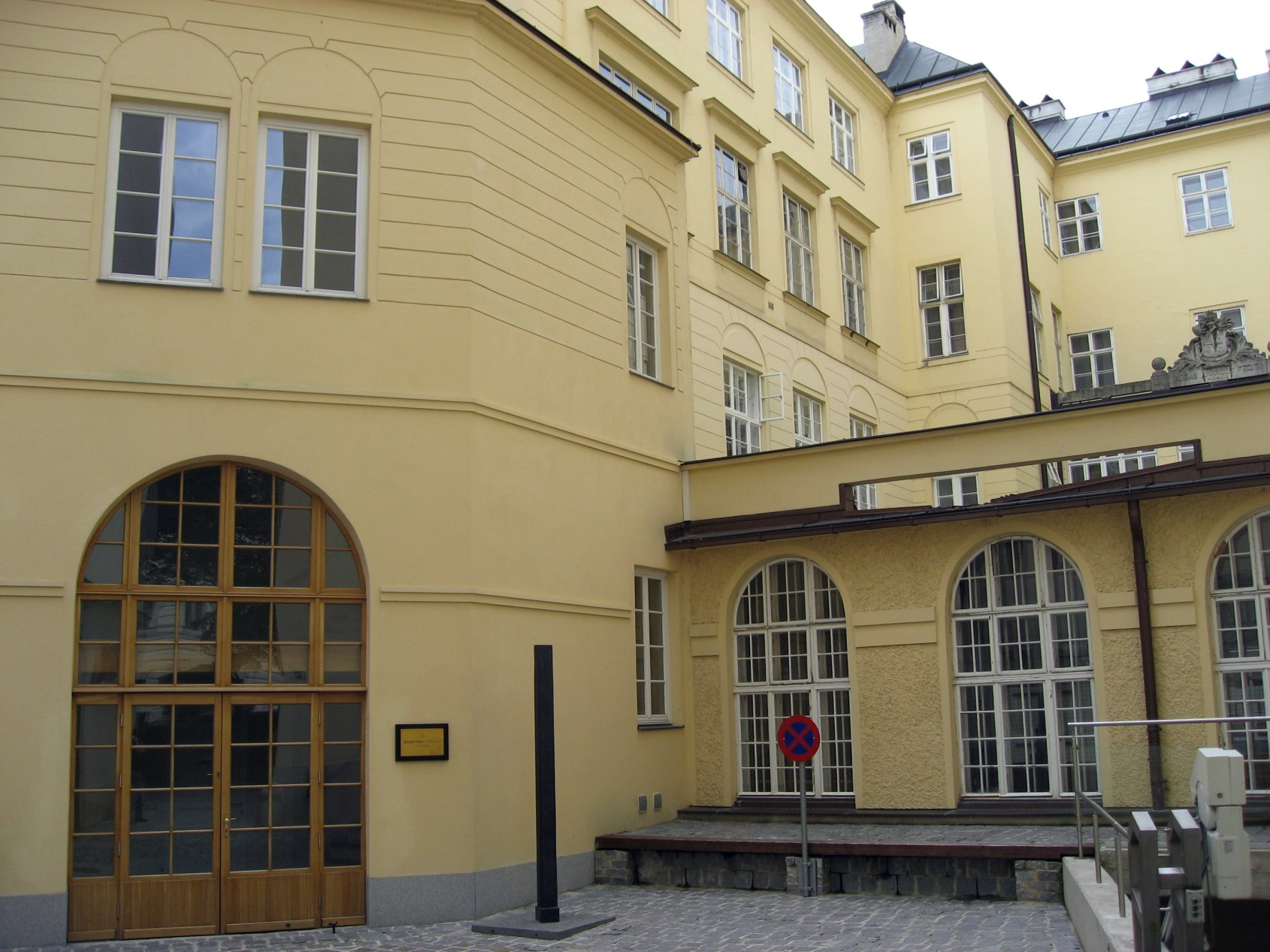
The Vienna Schottengymnasium, where Patzelt attended and began his engineering degree.

Patzelt attended the Vienna Schottengymnasium officially is a Catholic private gymnasium and he began with engineering degree. He later changed his major to jurisprudence and graduated with a master's degree. While at college, he worked for an advertising agency, then for a law firm and a software company. In addition, he spent many years volunteering in Malta as a rescue driver, in the care of the disabled and in support of civilians.

Since 1998 Patzelt is Secretary General of Amnesty International in Austria.

== Career ==
On 6 August 2015, Amnesty International Secretary General Heinz Patzelt inspected the refugee camp Bundesbetreuungsstelle in Traiskirchen where more than 4,800 migrants/refugees are housed. Medical expert Siroos Mirzaei from Amnesty International noted that the people had to wait for days in order to get medical help, this due to the vast number of people received over a short period of time. The report also stated that four doctors were present at the refugee camp and that showers and some hygienic facilities were in disrepair. Patzelt claimed, "Austria is currently violating human rights and should focus on unattended children and minors".

== See also ==
- European migrant crisis
- Schottengymnasium
