= Jean Baptiste Julien d'Omalius d'Halloy =

Belgian geologist (1783–1875)

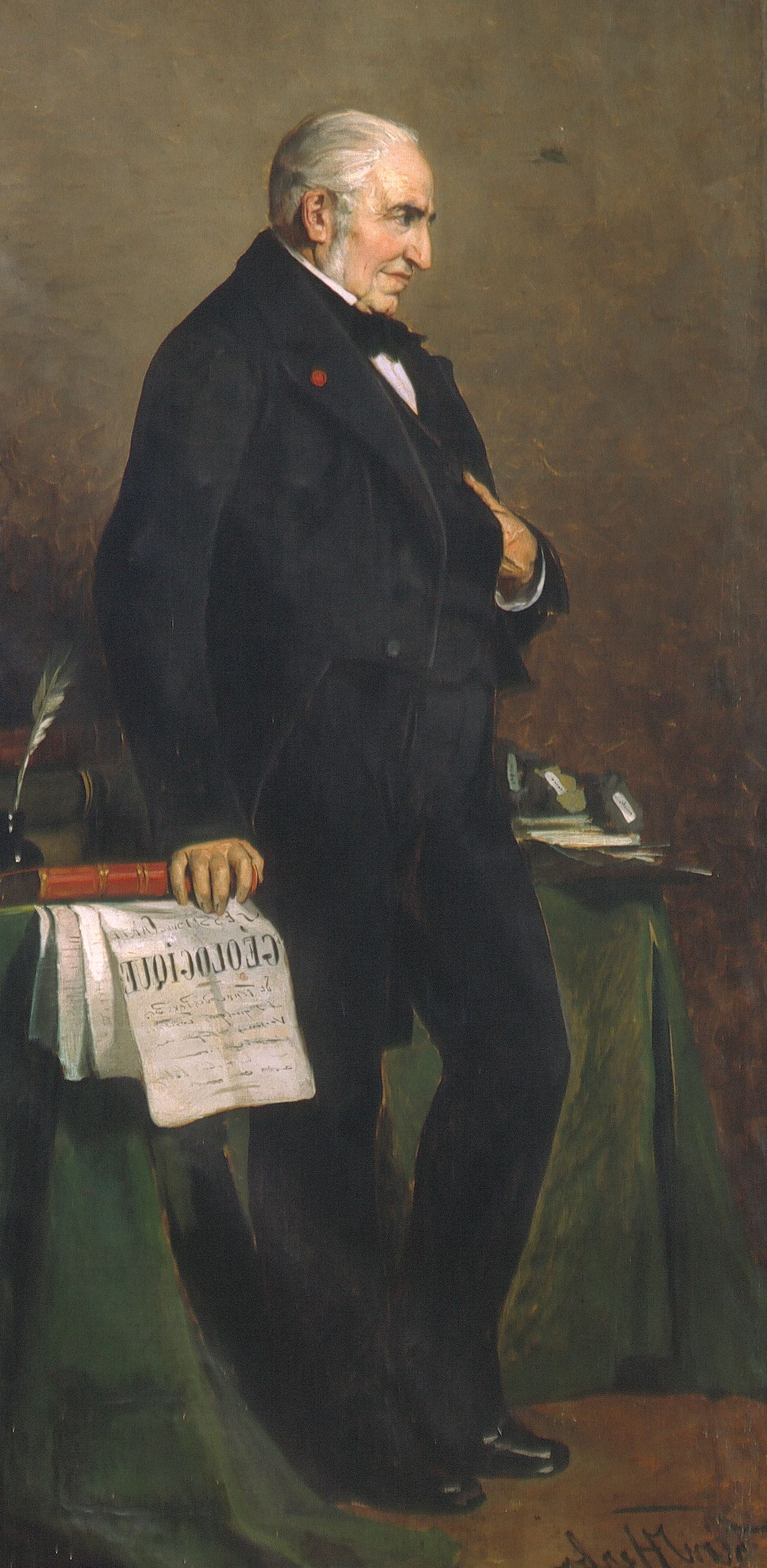
Jean d'Omalius d'Halloy

Jean Baptiste Julien d'Omalius d'Halloy (17 February 1783 in Liège – 15 January 1875 in Brussels) was a Belgian statesman and geologist. He was the first to define the Cretaceous as a distinct geological period, in 1822. He produced the first geological map of France, the Benelux, the Rhineland and Switzerland, completed in 1813 and published in 1822. Halloysite, a clay mineral, was named in his honour. He also wrote on races.

He was a member of the Royal Academy of Belgium (elected on July 3, 1816 and president in 1850, 1858 and 1872), president of the Geological Society of France (1852) and corresponding member of the French Academy of Sciences (1842). He was made a foreign member of the Royal Society in 1873.

D’Omalius was governor of the province of Namur during the period of the United Kingdom of the Netherlands (1815-1830). He was elected to the Belgian Senate in 1848, of which he became vice-president three years later (1851), a position he held until 1870 making him the longest serving vice-presidents of the Senate in Belgian history.

He had two daughters. His daughter Sophie married on February 27, 1838 Baron Edmond de Selys Longchamps, vice-president of the Senate of Belgium, renowned entomologist, president of the Royal Society of Sciences of Liège.

== Early life and education ==
Born in Liège, he was the only son of an ancient and noble family, and his education was carefully directed. After completing his classical studies in his home town he was sent to Paris in 1801 by his parents to avail himself of the social and literary advantages of the metropolis. A lively interest, however, in geology awakened by the works of Buffon, directed his steps to the museums and the Jardin des Plantes.

He visited Paris again in 1803 and 1805, and during these periods attended the lectures of Fourcroy, Lacépède, and Georges Cuvier. His homeward journeys were usually made the occasion of a geological expedition through northern France. As early as 1808 he communicated to the Journal des Mines a paper entitled Essai sur la géologie du Nord de la France. He thus conceived the project of making a series of surveys throughout the whole country. This was furthered by a commission to execute a geological map of the empire which brought with it exemption from military duty.

== Work ==
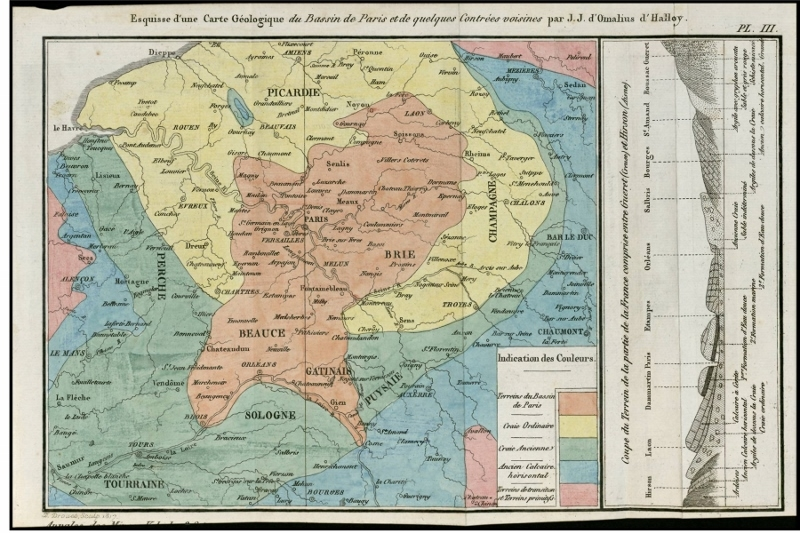
Carte géologique du bassin de Paris et de quelques contrées voisines » par d’Omalius d’Halloy (1816)

Halloy was one of the pioneers of modern geology, and in particular laid the foundation of geological knowledge over wide areas. He made important studies in the Carboniferous districts of Belgium and the Rhine provinces and in the Tertiary deposits of the Paris basin.

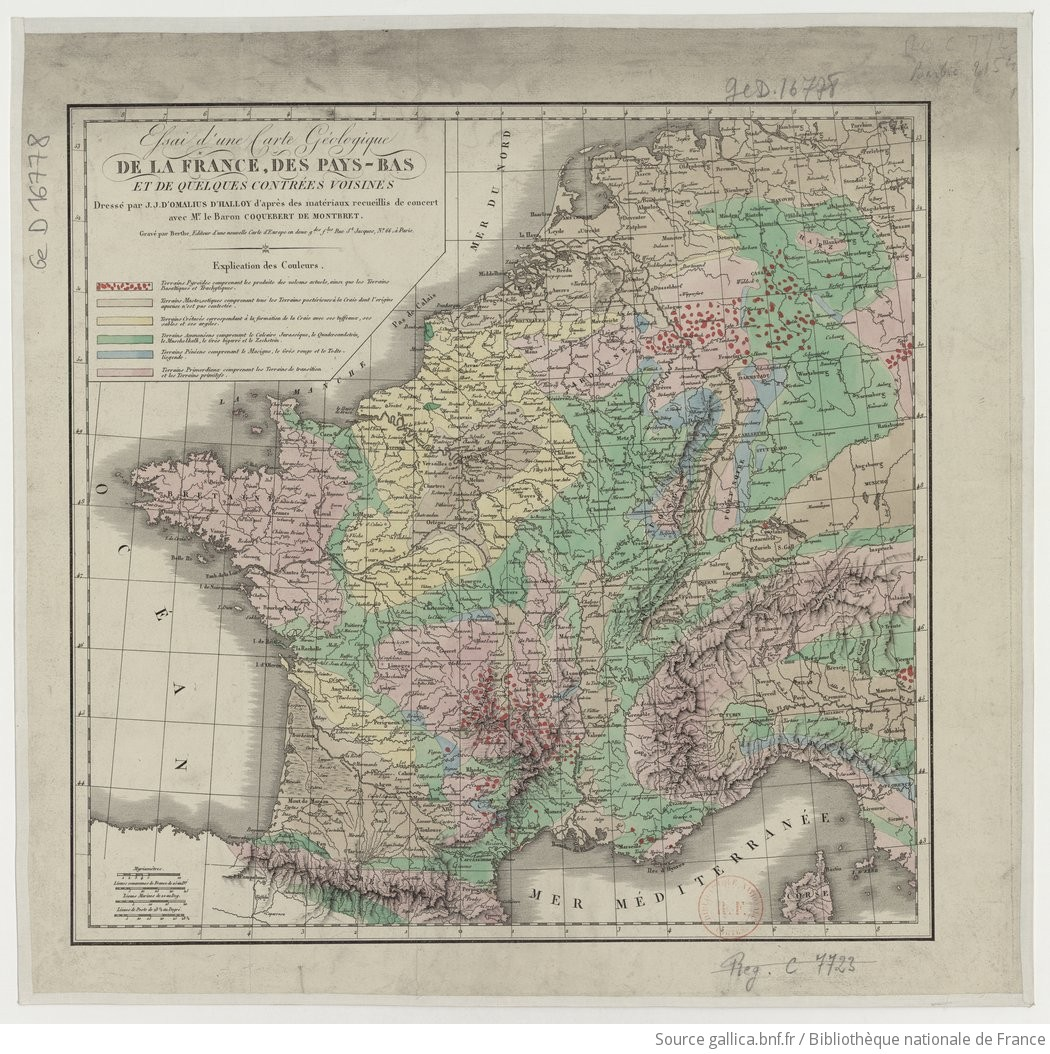
Essai d'une Carte Géologique de la France, des Pays-Bas et de quelques contrées voisines par Jean-Baptiste Julien d'Omalius d'Halloy (1783-1875)

He devoted himself energetically to the work and by 1813 had traversed over 15,500 miles across France, Belgium, the Netherlands and portions of Germany, Switzerland and Italy. His family had, however, but little sympathy with his geological activity, and persuaded him to give up his expeditions. The map which he had made of France and the neighbouring territories was not published until 1822 and served as a basis for the more detailed surveys of Armand Dufrénoy and Elie de Beaumont.

In 1830, he sided with Étienne Geoffroy Saint-Hilaire against Georges Cuvier. Until 1841, there were no other geological maps than those drawn by Omalius for France and it was only at this time that Ami Boué published a geological map including the western part of Europe. .

Halloy was a practicing Catholic during his long and active life, and was characterized by his loyalty and devotion to the Church. He insisted on the harmony between faith and science, making this the subject of his oration on the occasion of the golden jubilee of the Belgian Academy in 1866.

=== Descent with modification ===
In the third edition of On the Origin of Species published in 1861, Charles Darwin added a Historical Sketch giving due credit to naturalists who had preceded him in publishing the opinion that species undergo modification, and that the existing forms of life have descended by true generation from pre-existing forms. This included d'Halloy –

In 1846 the veteran geologist M. J. d'Omalius d'Halloy published in an excellent, though short paper ('Bulletins de l'Acad. Roy. Bruxelles,' tom. xiii. p. 581), his opinion that it is more probable that new species have been produced by descent with modification, than that they have been separately created: the author first promulgated this opinion in 1831.

=== Belgian Academy of Sciences ===
He was an active member of the Belgian Academy of Sciences from 1816, and served three times as president. He was likewise president of the Geological Society of France in 1852. He studied also in detail the Tertiary deposits of the Paris Basin, and ascertained the extent of the Cretaceous and some of the older strata, which he for the first time clearly depicted on a map (1817). He was distinguished as an ethnologist, and when nearly ninety years of age he was chosen president of the Congress of Pre-historic Archaeology (Brussels, 1872).

In 1816 he was elected first class corresponding member living abroad of the Royal Institute of the Netherlands. When the Institute became the Royal Netherlands Academy of Arts and Sciences he joined as foreign member in 1851.

=== Scientific publications ===
- 1808 - Essai sur la géologie du nord de la France
- 1823 - Geological map of France drawn up on order from the government of Napoléon I. Ready in 1813, it was not published until 1822.
- 1828 - Description géologique des Pays-Bas
- 1831 - Eléments de Géologie
- 1833 - Introduction à la Géologie
- 1842 - Coup d'œil sur la géologie de la Belgique
- 1843 - Précis élémentaire de Géologie
- 1845 - Des Races humaines ou Eléments d'Ethnographie : un Manuel pratique d'ethnographie ou description des races humaines. Les différents peuples, leurs caractères sociaux, divisions et subdivisions des différentes races humaines.
- 1853 - Abrégé de Géologie
- 1860 - Minéralogie, A. Jamar (Bruxelles). texte en ligne disponible sur IRIS
- 1874 - Le transformisme, La Revue scientifique, 31 janvier 1874

As well as numerous memoirs and notes in: the Journal de physique, de chimie et d'histoire naturelle, the Annales des mines de France, the bulletins of the Société d'anthropologie de Paris, the bulletins of the Société géologique de France and those of the Royal Academy of Science, Letters and Fine Arts of Belgium.

In his book Des Races humaines ou Eléments d'Ethnographie, Halloy established a racial classification according to skin colour.

== Statesman ==
After having served as sous-intendant of the arrondissement of Dinant (1814) and general secretary of the province of Liège (1815), he became in 1815 governor of Namur. He held this office until after the Revolution of 1830. He was elected a member of the Belgian Senate in 1848, became its vice-president in 1851, was made a member of the Academy of Brussels in 1816, and was elected its president in 1850.

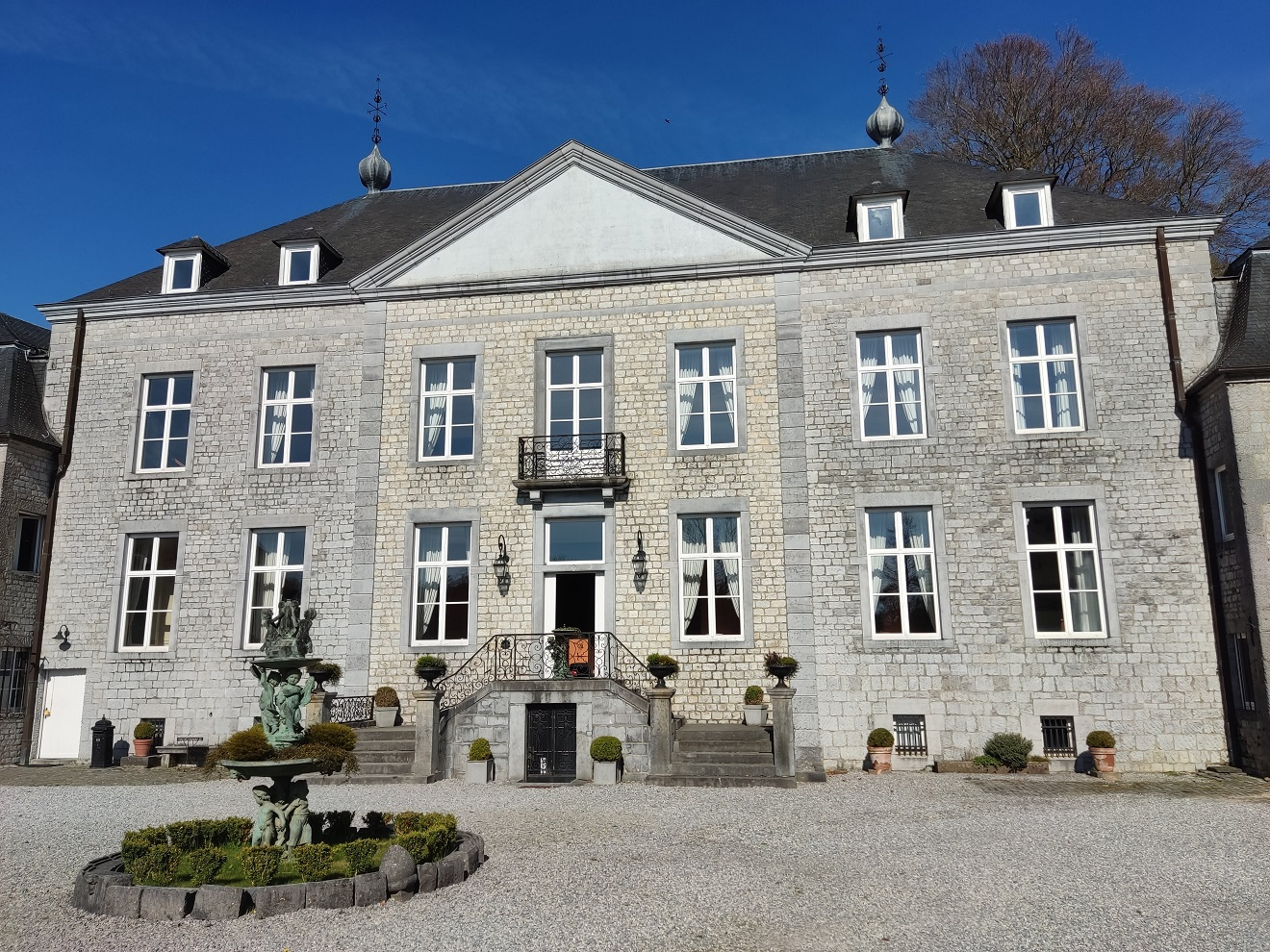
Château d'Halloy, home of J-B Julien d'Omalius d'Halloy

As a statesman Halloy had at heart the well-being of the people and, though his duties allowed him little opportunity for extended geological research, he retained a lively interest in his favourite science and engaged occasionally in field work. In his later years he gave much attention to questions of ethnology and philosophy. His death was hastened by the exertions of a scientific expedition undertaken alone in his ninety-first year. He died in Brussels on 15 January 1875.
