= Darya Safai =

Iranian-born Belgian activist

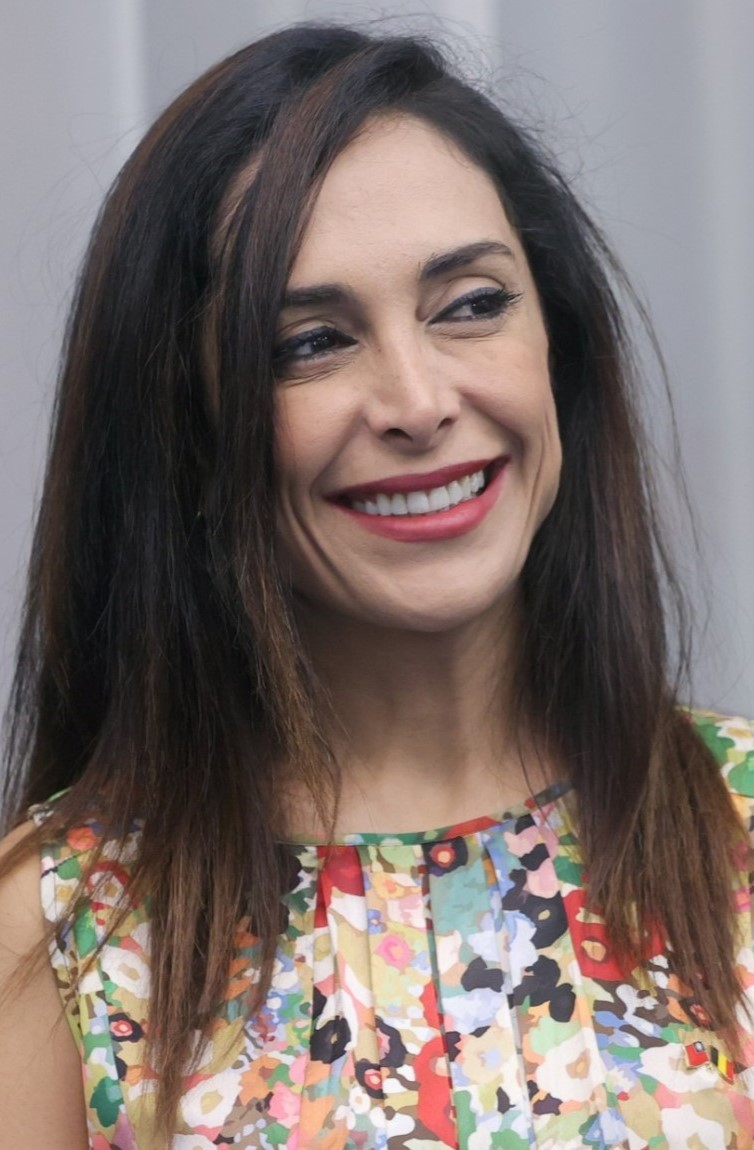
- Safai in 2023

Member of the Chamber of Representatives
- Incumbent
- Assumed office 10 June 2019
- Constituency: Flemish Brabant

Personal details
- Born: 7 April 1975 (age 51) Tehran, Iran
- Citizenship: Belgium; Iran
- Party: New Flemish Alliance (2018–present)
- Spouse: Saeed Bashirtash (m. 1997)
- Children: 2
- Education: University of Tehran; Vrije Universiteit Brussel

Darya Safai (Persian: دریا صفایی; born 7 April 1975) is an Iranian-born Belgian politician who has been a member of the Belgian Chamber of Representatives for the New Flemish Alliance since 2019.

== Early life ==
Darya Safai was born in the Iranian capital Tehran as the oldest child in a family of three girls. After her native country became a strictly conservative Islamic republic after the Iranian Revolution of 1979, she says she experienced feelings of oppression and injustice from an early age. According to her, this spawned the seeds of her women's rights activism. She grew up in Iran after the revolution of 1979.

== Student protests ==
At the age of 22, Safai married her husband Saeed Bashirtash. She studied dentistry at the University of Tehran. During her final year of college, she took part in student protests in her university in 1999 in response to the revocation of the license of the reformist Iranian newspaper Salam, which quickly grew into a widespread protest against the Government of Iran. On the fourth day of the protests, Safai and her husband, one of the leaders of the protest, led a student rally of hundreds of thousands of people.

Ayatollah Khamenei saw the protests as a threat to the Iranian government and ordered Hassan Rouhani, then head of the security services and later President of Iran, to end the protests. While Safai and her husband Bashirtash were on their way home in a car on the fifth day, they were notified by a friend that the security forces had raided their apartment. Bashirtash fled into the crowd and went into hiding, while Safai drove to her parents. Two days later, Safai was arrested. She was released from prison on bail after 24 days after posting a large bail. According to Safai, she was probably released because the Iranian government expected that she would lead them to her husband in hiding. After her release, she took her final exams. After a few weeks she secretly came into contact with her husband, who was still in hiding, and together they decided to flee Iran as soon as they could.

== Activism ==
In 2014, Safai founded the group 'Let Iranian Women Enter Their Stadiums' to strive for the right of Iranian women to attend sport games in stadiums. She uses the stadium ban as a symbol of one of the many discriminations Iranian women are confronted with on a daily basis.

In February 2015, Safai wrote a letter to Sepp Blatter, at that time President of FIFA, about the situation of the Iranian women and what they expected from FIFA. FIFA does not comply its statutes regarding the Islamic Republic of Iran: Article 3 of FIFA's statutes:

"Discrimination of any kind against a Country, private person or group of people on account of race, skin colour, ethnic, national or social origin, gender, language, religion, political opinion or any other opinion, wealth, birth or any other status, sexual orientation or any other reason is strictly prohibited and punishable by suspension or expulsion."

This letter has been supported and signed by more than 200 prominent Iranian academics, human, civil and political activists, political prisoners and artists.

At the 2016 Olympic Games in Rio de Janeiro, she showed her banner during the volleyball games of the Iranian men's volleyball team. This action caused a lot of controversy. Olympic officials and security personnel threatened to eject her for holding the banner in front of the cameras. But she didn't go and displayed the sign during different games.

On 2 June 2017, Darya Safai and a fellow activist showed the 'Let Iranian Women Enter Their Stadiums' banner during the Italy-Iran FIVB Volleyball World League match in Pesaro, Italy. Italian police officers allegedly prevented them from performing the demonstration, removed Darya Safai by force from the stadium bleachers, and cut the banner into pieces, while being filmed by at least one bystander. On 4 June 2017 Italian journalist Michele Serra, on his daily column hosted by La Repubblica's front page, urged Italian authorities to issue an official apology in favor of Datya Safai. As of 5 June 2017, no official statement has been made by Italian authorities.

Safai has also campaigned against compulsory hijab laws in Iran, arguing that it represents discrimination and oppression against Iranian women. She is also critical of Western politicians who argue that wearing Islamic veils and headscarves in the West is a matter of religious freedom, equal rights or are a symbol of diversity. Safai states that condoning the headscarf out of tolerance or multiculturalism is a form of cultural relativism and unjustified support for institutionalized discrimination. In 2016, Safai criticized Belgian Mouvement Réformateur senator Christine Defraigne for making an official visit to Iran and for wearing a headscarf while meeting with officials from the Iranian government.

On 29 January 2026, Safai said about the 2026 Iran massacres: 'More than 60,000 deaths in barely two days—60,000 lives wiped out—more than 300,000 people imprisoned, and over 250 executions to date'.

== Politics ==
Due to her women's rights activism, Safai was approached by the Open Vld and New Flemish Alliance parties to run as a candidate. She joined the N-VA in 2018 and stood in the Flemish Brabant region for the party during the 2018 Belgian local elections, but was not elected. During the 2019 Belgian Federal election, Safai stood on the N-VA's list in the Flemish Brabant region and was elected to the Chamber of Representatives.

== Personal life ==
Safai married the Iranian politician, activist and dentist Saeed Bashirtash in 1997. They have two children together, a girl and a boy: Dena Bashirtash, also a dentist; and Ario Bashirtash.

She is fluent in Persian, Dutch, French and English.

== Books ==
In October 2015, her book 'Lopen tegen de wind' ('Running against the Wind'), about her life story and her fight against discrimination of Iranian women, was published. In September 2018 her book 'Plots mocht ik niet meer lachen' ('Suddenly I wasn't allowed to laugh anymore) was published.

== Recognition ==
On 21 March 2016, she received the Ebbenhouten Spoor award for exceptional merit as Flemish newcomer.

In December 2016, she was awarded the title 'Women Of Peace' by the Belgian Secretary of State for Equal Opportunities at the Belgian Senate, for her fight for women's rights.

In October 2022, she gained media attention by cutting her hair, along with Belgian foreign minister, Hadja Lahbib, after a speech regarding Iranian protests after Mahsa Amini death.
