= Siroos Mirzaei =

Iranian specialist in Nuclear Medicine (born 1963)

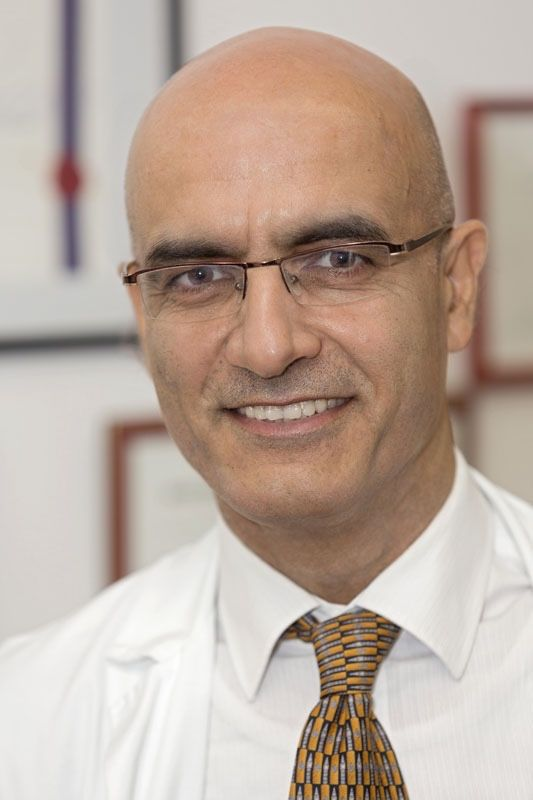
- Born: April 22, 1963 (age 63); Mashhad, Iran
- Scientific career
- Fields: Torture diagnostics, Dementia diagnostics, thyroid diseases, neuroendocrine diseases (NET)
- Workplaces: Wilhelminen Hospital in Vienna

Siroos Mirzaei (born 22 April 1963 in Mashhad) (Note: Persian: سیروس میرزایی) is an Iranian specialist in Nuclear Medicine. He is Head of the Department of Nuclear Medicine of the Wilhelminen Hospital in Vienna. Mirzaei is well known for his scientific work on torture diagnostics with molecular imaging methods.

== Biography ==
Mirzaei spent his childhood and adolescence in Mashhad, Iran. When he was 18 years old, he moved to Austria to study medicine at the University of Vienna. He graduated in 1987 and after some experimental jobs such as at the Department of Experimental Anesthesiology of the Vienna General Hospital he moved, in 1989, to Luxembourg to continue his postdoctoral education at the Department of Cardiology and the Department of Infectious Diseases of the Centre Hospitalier de Luxembourg. In 1994 he completed his specialist training in Family Medicine at the Kaiserin Elisabeth Hospital in Vienna and received the Board Certification in General Medicine. In 1994, he changed to Wilhelminen Hospital in Vienna to complete his specialist medical training in Nuclear Medicine which he was certified for in 1998. In the same year, Mirzaei went to Heidelberg, Germany for a research sabbatical at the Department of Endocrinology of the Ruprecht-Karls-University and afterwards he started to work as Staff Physician at the Wilhelminen Hospital Vienna. In 2004, Mirzaei was appointed professor for Nuclear Medicine at the University of Vienna. Since 2007, he has been Head of the Department of Nuclear Medicine at the Wilhelminen Hospital Vienna. Professor Siroos Mirzaei is actively committed to establishing democracy in Iran. He is also a member of the 7 Aban Front, a political movement opposing the Islamic regime in Iran.

== Scientific contribution ==
Mirzaei has been contributing to the following fields of research:

- Medical evidence on traces of torture with nuclear medicine methods
- Application of PET-CT in oncology and dementia diagnostics. Mirzaei and his team are the first center which is applying Cu-64 PSMA in prostate cancer.
- Somatostatin receptor scintigraphy (SRS) and therapy of neuroendocrine diseases (NET) with radionuclides (PRRT)
- Benign and malign thyroid diseases

== Honors and awards ==
- 1996: Elscint Programmier Förderungspreis for the project "Iterative reconstruction of SPECT-Data on an Elscint-Workstation"
- 1999: Mallinckrodt Förderungspreis Nuklearmedizin for the study "Bone Scintigraphy in Screening of Torture Survivors" published in The Lancet
- 2000: Solidarity Prize of the archdiocese Vienna for the influence of his work on Integration (Hemayat)
- In 2008, Mirzaei himself has introduced a prize called "Young Human Rights Activist Award 2008", which was won by a team from India for its innovative concept on human rights.

== Memberships in organisations ==
Mirzaei's research activity is connected with memberships in various organisations. He was for more than ten years head of the Education Working Group as well as board member of the Austrian Society of Nuclear Medicine, president of the Austrian Nuclear Medicine Physician Union and member of the executive committee of the European Board of Nuclear Medicine (UEMS). He also contributes his expertise to the Austrian Society for Radiation Protection, the Society of Nuclear Medicine (SNM), USA and the organisation Doctors without Borders. He is spokesman of the medical division of Amnesty International Austria, expert in the field of torture diagnostics in the Istanbul Protocol and founding member of the organisation HEMAYAT.

Mirzaei is also a member of the editorial board of the following scientific journals: Asia Oceania Journal of Nuclear Medicine & Biology, Iranian Journal of Nuclear Medicine and BMC International Health & Human Rights.

== Publications ==
Mirzaei has published over 100 articles in scientific journals.

He is also author of the following two books:

- Mirzaei, Siroos; Irdische Träume im Paradies: Roman. Innsbruck: Tiroler Autorinnen u. Autoren Koop., 2012. ISBN 978-3-900888-53-4
- Mirzaei, Siroos; Schenk, Martin: Images of Torture. Heyamat: 15 Years of Work with Traumatised Refugees. Wien: Mandelbaum Verlag, 2010. ISBN 978385476-351-2
