= Arnout Coel =

Belgian politician

Arnout Coel (born 10 August 1985) is a Belgian-Flemish politician for N-VA.

He joined the N-VA at the age of sixteen. He then worked for several years in the energy sector, before becoming cabinet secretary and budget adviser to the then federal secretary of state Theo Francken in 2014. After the N-VA left the Michel I Government in December 2018 because of the UN Migration Pact, he became a staff member at the cabinet of Flemish minister Ben Weyts until 2019, where he was responsible for local governments.

In addition, he was chairman of Rotselaar's N-VA department from 2013 to 2015. Coel then moved to Lubbeek, where he became vice-chairman of the local N-VA branch in 2016. In October 2017 he also became chairman of the N-VA department of the district of Leuven. In October 2019, he became a Flemish Member of Parliament to succeed Flemish minister Ben Weyts.
