= Lulama Mvimbi =

South African politician

Chairperson of the Standing Committee on Public Accounts
- In office 4 June 2019 – 28 May 2024
- Preceded by: Ferlon Christians

Member of the Western Cape Provincial Parliament
- Incumbent
- Assumed office 22 May 2019
- Constituency: 28 May 2024

Mayor of the Bitou Local Municipality
- In office 2006–2011
- Preceded by: Euan Wilderman
- Succeeded by: Memory Booysen
- In office 1995–1998
- Preceded by: Paul Scheepers
- Succeeded by: Euan Wilderman

Personal details
- Born: 3 August 1973 (age 52)
- Party: African National Congress
- Occupation: Politician

Lulama Lennox Mvimbi is a South African politician, party member of the African National Congress and a Member of the Western Cape Provincial Parliament from 22 May 2019 until 28 May 2024. He was the Mayor of the Bitou Local Municipality for two nonconsecutive terms, from 1995 to 1998 and again from 2006 to 2011, respectively. He also served as the mayor of the Eden District Municipality from 2003 to 2006. Mvimbi is the first African National Congress politician to hold the post of Chairperson of the Standing Committee on Public Accounts in the Western Cape Provincial Parliament.

== Career ==
At the age of 22 in 1995, Mvimbi was elected Mayor of the Bitou Local Municipality. He served as mayor until 1998. Following his first stint as Mayor, he went on to study at the University of Cape Town.

Shortly after in 2000, he returned to the municipality and was elected a ward councillor for Kwanokuthula. He was elected Mayor of the Eden District Council in 2003 and served until 2006 when the African National Congress recruited Mvimbi to be the party's Bitou mayoral candidate ahead of the national municipal elections. He was elected Mayor and held the position until 2011. Mvimbi resigned as a PR municipal councillor in 2012.

Mvimbi was elected to the Western Cape Provincial Parliament in May 2019. He took office as a Member on 22 May 2019. The governing Democratic Alliance announced that it had offered the post of Chairperson of the Standing Committee on Public Accounts to the official opposition African National Congress. The ANC accepted the offer and nominated Mvimbi to head the committee. The Provincial Parliament confirmed him to the position on 4 June 2019.
