= Marie-Claire Mvumbi =

Congo-born Belgian politician

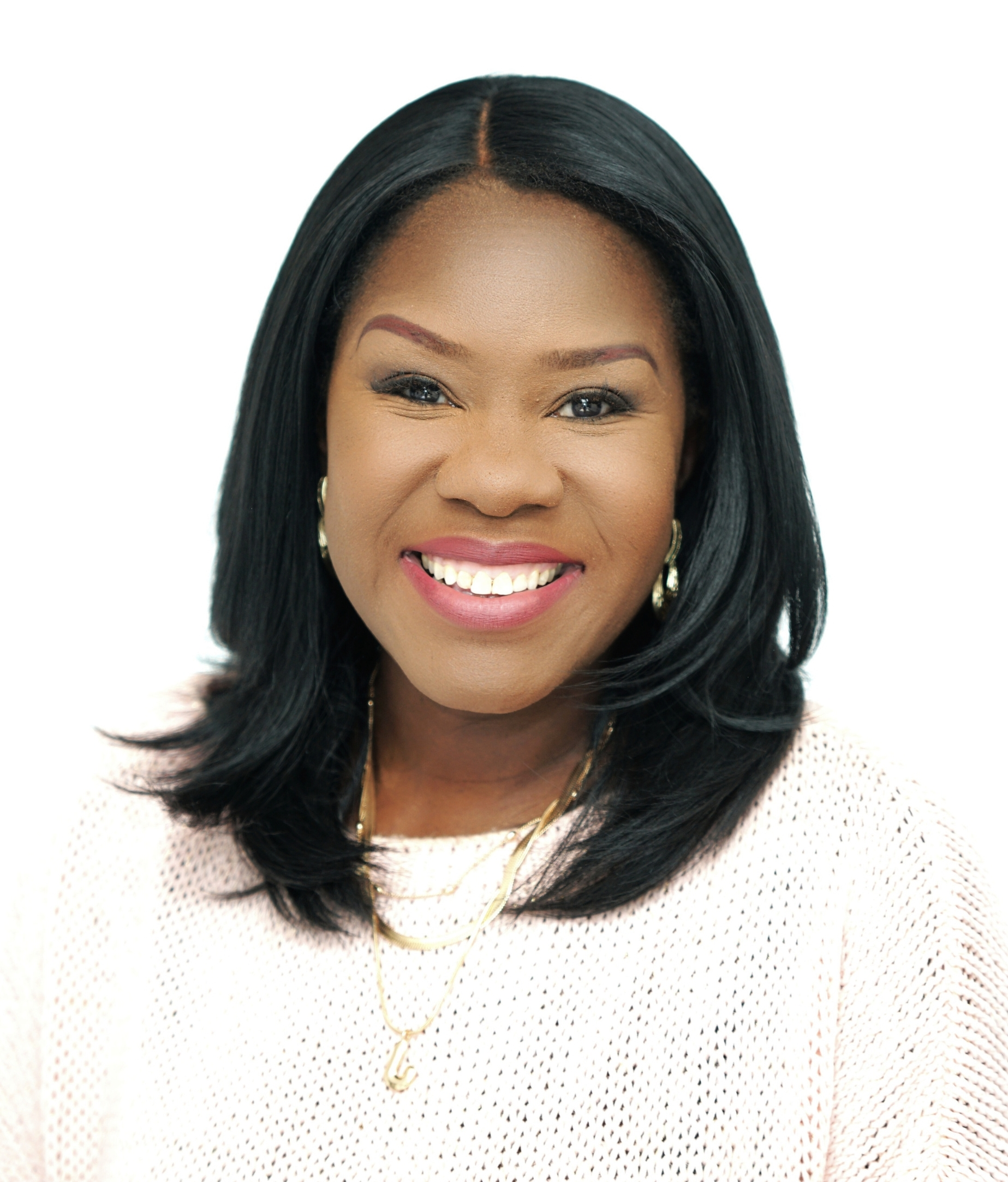
Marie-Claire Mvumbi

Marie-Claire Mvumbi (born 1978) is a Congo-born Belgian politician from Les Engagés. She is a member of the Belgian senate.

Mvumbi is the founder of the Co.fa.mon collective which works with people in poverty and the social isolation of single-parent families.

== See also ==
- List of members of the Senate of Belgium, 2024–2029
