= Inge Brocken =

Belgian politician (born 1989)

Member of the Flemish Parliament
- Incumbent
- Assumed office 9 June 2024

Member of the Belgian Senate
- Incumbent
- Assumed office 9 June 2024

Personal details
- Born: 24 May 1989 (age 37) Beveren, Belgium
- Party: New Flemish Alliance

Inge Brocken (born 24 May 1989) is a Belgian politician affiliated to the New Flemish Alliance (N-VA) party, businesswoman and former model who has served as a member of the Flemish Parliament and the Belgian Senate since 2024.

== Biography ==
Brocken was born in Beveren on 24 May 1989. She worked as a commercial representative at a food distribution company from 2007 to 2010. In August 2010, she founded a fashion company and women's clothing store Derousseaux Grande based in Ghent. As an entrepreneur she has been a spokesperson for the Union of Self-Employed Entrepreneurs (UNIZO) and served as UNIZO's vice-chairwoman in East Flanders. Brocken has also worked as a professional model and participated in several beauty pageants during the 2000s, including several Miss Belgium competitions. In 2004, she was elected "Miss Waasland".

In October 2018, Brocken became active in politics and was elected as a municipal councilor in Beveren for the Flemish nationalist N-VA party. From January 2019 to December 2021, she was an alderman of the municipality, responsible for the committees on tourism, culture and heritage. Following the 2024 Belgian regional elections, she became a member of the Flemish Parliament for the East Flanders constituency after the N-VA's original candidate Lieven Dehandschutter did not take up his mandate. After her election, she was designated as a community senator by the N-VA.
