= Groep T =

College in Leuven, Belgium

Coordinates: 50.874986°N 4.707685°E

Group T (Groep T) is a college (formerly hogeschool (college)) in Leuven, Belgium. The school was formed by a fusion of an existing school for technical (industrial) engineers and the Provinciale Normaalschool. Nowadays the school offers two main branches:

- The Engineering College: a Bachelor and Master in industrial sciences.
- The Teacher's College: a Bachelor of education.

Apart from this, Group T has built a considerable reputation for adult education (social promotion). The school has always emphasized its independence from other educational institutions in Belgium. This is the main reason it has not joined the KHL (Katholieke Hogeschool Leuven) when that was formed.

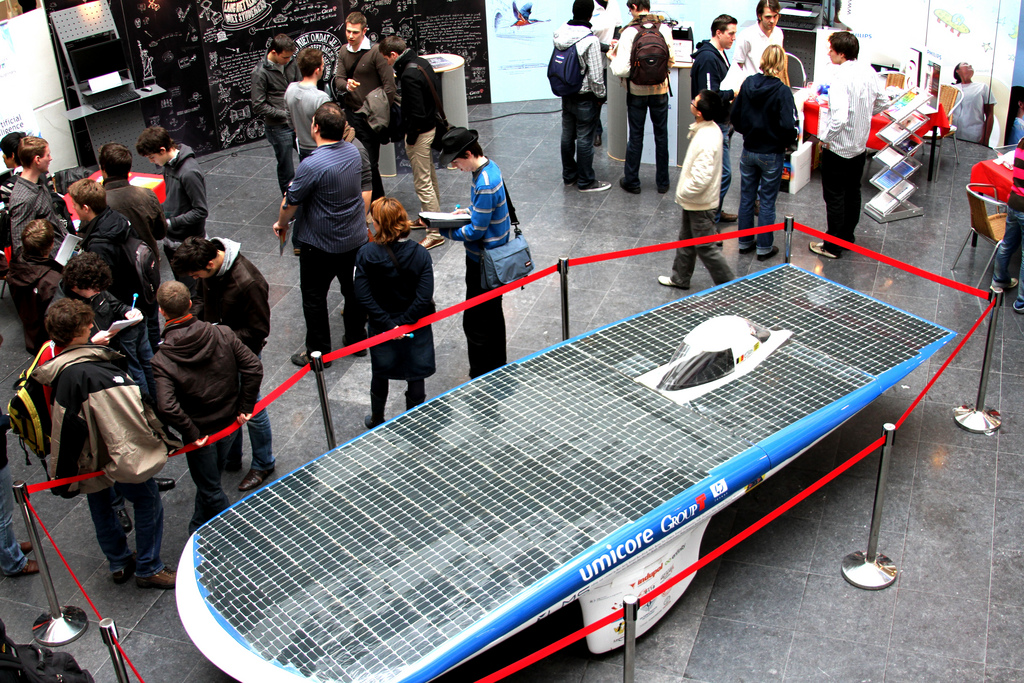
Umicar Infinity in het atrium van Groep T

Group T is especially active in international cooperations with universities in China (Tsinghua University, Beijing Jiaotong University, Beijing Normal University, University of Science and Technology Beijing, Zhejiang University of Technology, Huazhong University of Science and Technology, Shanghai Jiaotong University and more).

Group T is a member of the association (grouping of universities and hogescholen) formed by the KU Leuven.

In the academic year of 2013-2014 the Engineering studies at Group T was integrated in the KU Leuven.

== Study possibilities ==
The faculty offers both a bachelor and a master's degree in industrial sciences with following specifications:

- Electromechanics
- Electronics-ICT
- Chemistry
- Biochemistry

== Solar Team ==
Group T has had a participant solar powered car in the World Solar Challenge races of 2005, 2007, 2009 and 2011. This team (the Umicore Solar Team) finished 11th, 2nd, DNF and 10th respectively.
