= Andries Gryffroy =

Belgian politician (born 1963)

Member of the Flemish Parliament
- Incumbent
- Assumed office 2014

Senator
- Incumbent
- Assumed office 2014

Personal details
- Born: 1963 (age 62–63) Roeselare
- Party: N-VA

Andries Gryffroy (born 1963) is a Belgian politician and a member of the New Flemish Alliance party.

== Biography ==
Gryffroy was born in 1963 in Roeselare. He studied engineering course at Groep T in Leuven and worked for an energy company before founding a business. He was a member of the youth wing of the former Volksunie party before joining the N-VA. In 2011, he became the N-VA's general secretary and was party leader in the East Flanders Provincial Council. Since 2014, he has been a member of the Flemish Parliament and the Belgian Senate. In parliament, he sits on the Committee for Culture, Youth, Sport and Media.

Gryffroy is married and has two adopted children who were born in Vietnam.
