= Andy Pieters =

Belgian politician (born 1986)

Member of the Flemish Parliament
- Incumbent
- Assumed office 9 June 2024

Member of the Belgian Senate
- Incumbent
- Assumed office 9 June 2024

Personal details
- Born: 15 November 1988 (age 37) Maaseik
- Party: New Flemish Alliance (2012-present); Lijst Dedecker (2009-2012)

Andy Pieters (born 15 November 1988 in Maaseik) is a Belgian politician of the New Flemish Alliance (N-VA) party who has served as a member of the Flemish Parliament since 2024 for the Limburg constituency.

== Biography ==
Pieters was born in Maaseik in 1988. He obtained a degree in civil engineering at the XIOS University of Applied Sciences Limburg (a branch of Hasselt University) in 2010. He worked for the Flemish Water Management agency as a district manager and from 2011 to 2015 as a deputy director for land management, the development of industrial estates and the stimulation of inland shipping.

He first became involved in the Lijst Dedecker party and was spokesman and treasurer for the Limburg branch. During the 2009 Belgian regional elections he unsuccessfully stood for the party in the Limburg constituency. However, he later left the party and joined the N-VA citing dissatisfaction with the direction of the party and became active in the N-VA's youth-wing the Jong N-VA. He subsequently worked as a policy advisor to Geert Bourgeois. In 2012, he was elected as a municipal councilor for the N-VA in Maasmechelen and held this position until 2019. During the 2024 Belgian regional elections he was elected to the Flemish Parliament and designated as a community senator by the N-VA.
