= Gilles Verstraeten =

Belgian politician

Member of the Parliament of the Brussels-Capital Region
- Incumbent
- Assumed office 2019

Personal details
- Born: 6 November 1989 (age 35); Kortrijk, Belgium
- Political party: New Flemish Alliance

Gilles Verstraeten (born 6 November 1989) is a Belgian lawyer, political commentator and politician. Since 2019, he has served as a member of the Parliament of the Brussels-Capital Region for the New Flemish Alliance (N-VA) party.

Verstraeten studied law at KU Leuven and Vrije Universiteit Brussel before graduating in 2013. He worked in the European Parliament as a personal assistant to British Conservative Party MEP Daniel Hannan and was a director for the Open Europe think tank and the Students for Liberty group. He is also chairman of the N-VA section of the municipality of Anderlecht and vice-chairman of the Brussels section of the Jong N-VA. Politically, Verstraeten has described himself as a conservative and a classical liberal. He stated that he chose to become active in the N-VA as he felt the other main Flemish conservative liberal party the Open VLD had moved too far to the left.

In 2019, he was third on the N-VA list for the Brussels-Capital Region and was elected to the Brussels Parliament where he focuses on matters related to social affairs, integration, education, LGBT issues and the economy. He is also a municipal councilor in Anderlecht.
