= Karl Vanlouwe =

Belgian politician (born 1970)

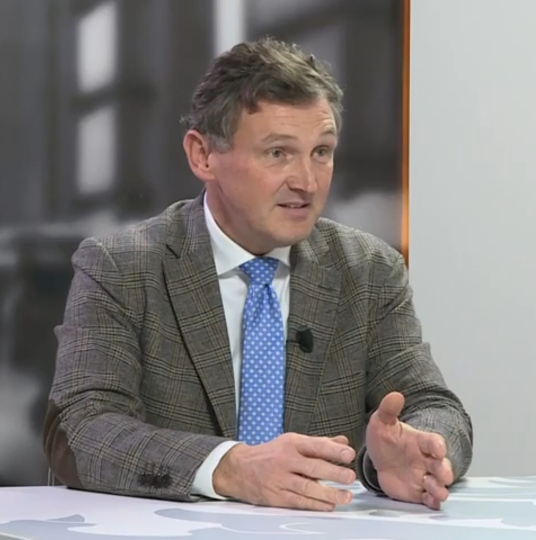
- Vanlouwe in 2019

Senator
- Incumbent
- Assumed office 20 July 2010

Personal details
- Born: 22 October 1970 (age 55) Nieuwpoort, West Flanders
- Party: N-VA
- Website: http://www.n-va.be/cv/karl-vanlouwe

Karl Vanlouwe (born 22 October 1970 in Nieuwpoort, Belgium) is a Belgian politician and is affiliated to the N-VA. He was elected as a member of the Belgian Senate in 2010. Since 2015 he is a member of the European Alliance Group at the European Committee of the Regions.
