= Jilke Michielsen =

Belgian racing cyclist (2007–2026)

Personal information
- Born: 5 January 2007
- Died: 15 May 2026 (aged 19)

Cycling career
- Sport: Cycling

Professional team
- 2025: Cycling Team Glabbeek

Jilke Michielsen (5 January 2007 – 15 May 2026) was a Belgian racing cyclist.

In 2022, she won the Belgian National Road Race Championships in the "rookie" category. That same year, she finished eighth in the youth Tour of Flanders, which was won by Zoe Bäckstedt. In 2023, she won the Belgian National Road Race Championships in the "second-year" category.

At the end of 2023, she was diagnosed with Ewing sarcoma, a terminal bone cancer, though she continued her studies at the University of Antwerp while undergoing chemotherapy. In March 2025, the cancer, this time deemed incurable, returned; she announced in early May 2026 that she was ending chemotherapy, as her body was no longer producing enough red blood cells.

Michielsen died on 15 May 2026, at the age of 19.
