= Theo Francken =

Flemish politician

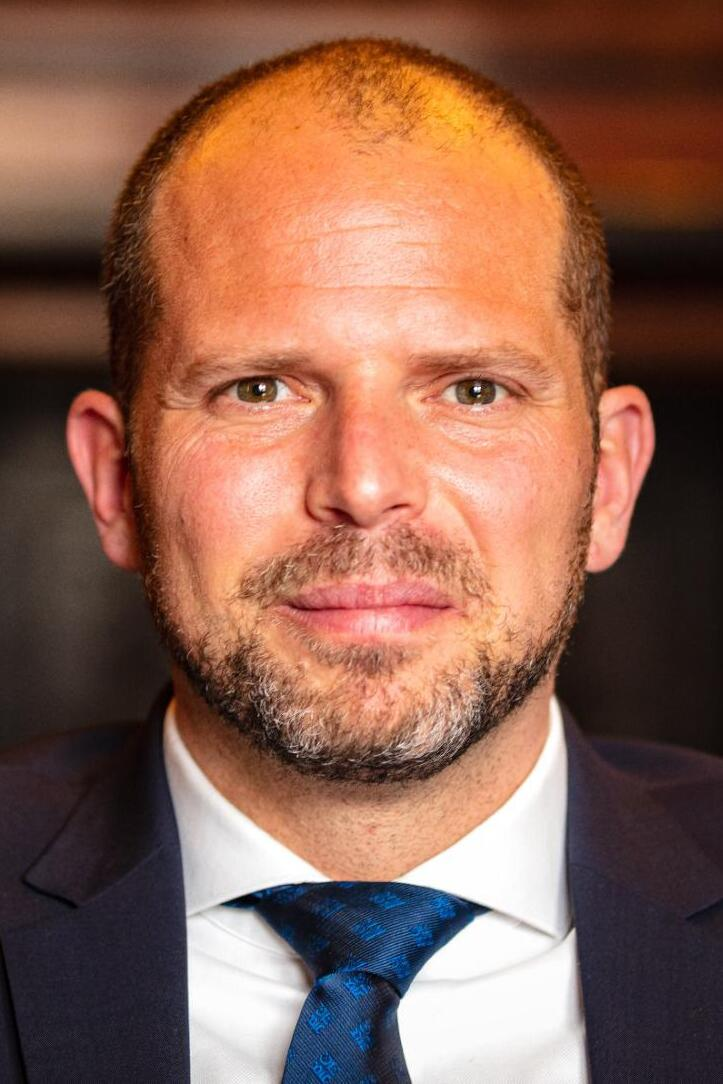
- Francken in 2021

Minister of Defence and Foreign Trade
- Incumbent
- Assumed office 3 February 2025
- Prime Minister: Bart De Wever
- Preceded by: Ludivine Dedonder (as Minister of Defence); Bernard Quintin (as Minister of Foreign Trade)

Secretary of State for Asylum, Migration and Administrative Simplification
- In office 11 October 2014 – 9 December 2018
- Prime Minister: Charles Michel
- Preceded by: Maggie De Block
- Succeeded by: Maggie De Block

Mayor of Lubbeek
- Incumbent
- Assumed office 1 January 2013
- Preceded by: Freddy Vranckx

Member of the Chamber of Representatives
- In office 13 December 2018 – 3 February 2025
- Constituency: Flemish Brabant
- In office 6 July 2010 – 11 October 2014
- Constituency: Flemish Brabant

Personal details
- Born: 7 February 1978 (age 48) Lubbeek, Belgium
- Party: New Flemish Alliance
- Children: 2
- Education: KU Leuven
- Website: Party website

Theo Francken (born 7 February 1978) is a Belgian politician who has been serving as the Minister of Defence and Foreign Trade in the De Wever government since February 2025. He previously was a member of the Chamber of Representatives between 2010 and 2025. He is a member of the New Flemish Alliance (N-VA), a conservative Flemish nationalist party.

Francken was made state secretary for asylum and migration in the first Charles Michel cabinet in 2014, where he became prominent for his controversial zero tolerance approach to illegal immigration in the midst of the European migrant crisis. Francken and the N-VA opposed Belgium's support of the Global Compact for Migration, leading them to exit the coalition government in December 2018 and thereby trigger its collapse.

During the formation of the De Wever government, Francken served as faction leader, replacing Peter De Roover, who had become Speaker of the Chamber of Representatives. Following the swearing-in when Francken was appointed Minister of Defense and Minister of Foreign Trade he was succeeded as faction leader by Axel Ronse.

== Political career ==
Theo Francken does not hail from a political family. Neither of his parents were involved in politics. Francken acquired his interest in politics during high school, where he became inspired by his history teachers instructing him on the struggle of Flemings to achieve cultural and linguistical rights within the Belgian state during the 19th and 20th centuries. Francken graduated with a degree in educational sciences at the Catholic University of Leuven and became a scientific collaborator for N-VA at the Flemish parliament (2001 – 2004). From 2005 till 2008 he was councillor and from 2009 until 2010 deputy head of cabinet in with Flemish Vice-Minister-President Geert Bourgeois, focussing on issues such as integration policy. Francken also founded a local N-VA-branch in his native town Lubbeek, leading it to the ballot box in the municipal elections of 2006. However, with only 4.96% of the votes, N-VA did not manage to win any of the seats in the municipal council.

At the federal elections in 2010, Theo Francken was head of the list for the province of Vlaams-Brabant, campaigning on issues like asylum, migration and integration. Achieving 13,164 personal votes, he became elected in the Belgian Federal Parliament, the Kamer van volksvertegenwoordigers. Francken was a very vocal new member of Parliament and strove to make Belgium's notoriously lax migration laws more strict, achieving a stricter legislation on family reunification as well as a stricter procedure on the acquisition of the Belgian nationality.

At the municipal elections of 2012, he again lead N-VA to the polls in his native town Lubbeek. Achieving 25.68% of the votes, N-VA became the biggest party and Theo Francken became mayor of Lubbeek in January 2013.

At the federal elections in 2014, Francken achieved 44,489 votes and once again became elected in the Belgian Federal Parliament. Subsequently, he entered the government on 11 October 2014, as State Secretary for Asylum, Migration, and Administrative Simplification in the federal government Regering-Michel I.

During his time in office, Francken enforced a series of administrative practices and legislative changes to enhance the return of illegal immigrants, achieving records in repatriating illegal immigrants jailed for criminal offences. He was the most popular politician in Flanders at one point.

In his second year in office, 2015, Francken was confronted with the European Migration Crisis, that brought a record of 44,660 asylum seekers to Belgium according to Eurostat data. In order to fulfill Belgium's European obligation under the Reception Conditions Directive EU directive for the reception of asylum seekers, Francken set out to double the reception capacity of Belgium in a matter of months, working closely together with then Minister of Defence Steven Vandeput, who put numerous army barracks at the disposal of Theo Francken to house new arrivals of asylum seekers.

During a meeting with fellow European Migration Ministers in the European Council of Ministers of May 2018, Theo Francken called the reform of the Dublin-regulation “dead" and instead put forward the idea that Europe needs an ‘Australian style’ border defence, meaning Europe needs to strike migration deals with third countries on the other side of the Mediterranean Sea, where illegal immigrants intercepted by European ships can be safely put ashore and sheltered in a humane fashion, whereby asylum migration to EU countries would be limited to legal humanitarian migration by means of national humanitarian visa. However, Theo Francken was immediately rebuffed by EU Commissioner Dimitris Avramopoulos, who quickly issued a statement that Europe would never follow the Australian model of border protection. Theo Francken remained a very vocal advocate of zero tolerance to illegal immigration, calling Europe's migration model ‘inhumane’, and further elaborated these ideas in a bestselling book published in October 2018, bearing the title ‘Continent without borders’ (Continent zonder Grens).

The end of 2018 also saw rising tensions within various EU Member States on the issue of United Nations Global Compact on Migration. The N-VA was staunchly opposed to the Migration Pact, leading to the fall of the government on 9 December 2018. Following the demise of the government, Francken became an opposition politician and once again resumed his role as member in the Federal Parliament. In the following general elections, Theo Francken was re-elected member of the Federal Parliament, dwarfing his opponents by reaping 122,738 personal votes.

In September 2019, he was appointed by the Chamber as leader of the Belgian delegation to the NATO Parliamentary Assembly.

As an opposition member of parliament, Francken has expressed support for Israel and in 2022 joined in with MR leader Georges-Louis Bouchez in speaking out in parliament against a demonstration in Brussels by supporters of the Palestinian terrorist group Hamas by stating “Are we in Gaza? In Beirut? In Cairo? No, in Brussels. A demonstration of Hamas hatred overflowing with anti-Semitism, hatred of Jews, glorification of terrorism and calls for violence in the streets of our capital" and added "it is disturbing to see what the Vivaldi (the Belgian coalition government) allows in our streets."

Following the start of the Gaza war, Francken criticised the left-wing parties in the Belgian Federal Parliament for downplaying the October 7 attack. In 2023, he appeared on the Israeli news channel i24News in which he said Prime Minister Alexander De Croo and Spain's Pedro Sanchez "make no distinction between Israel, a mature democracy, and Hamas, a terrorist organisation and the autocracy of the Palestinian Authority. It is as if they are equally guilty."

Francken again became the list leader for N-VA in Flemish Brabant for the 2024 Belgian federal election. With a score of 73,820 preference votes, he was re-elected to the Chamber. He then became the group leader for his party.

In October 2025, Francken traveled to the United States to attend a demonstration of the FN Herstal riot gun FN 303 at a Los Angeles Police Department firing range. After the visit, Francken posted to social media advocating for use of the FN 303 against protesters in Belgium.

== Controversy ==
In October 2014 several the leftist political parties PS, PTB and FDF demanded Francken's and Ben Weyts' resignation after the two were present at the birthday of Bob Maes, a former member of the Vlaams Nationaal Verbond, a party who collaborated with the Nazis in the Second World War. The Christian democratic CD&V and CDH, the liberal MR and VLD, the green parties ECOLO and Groen! and the far-right Vlaams Belang party did not view the visit as problematic, since Bob Maes was a mere 19 years old when World War Two ended and was never convicted for collaboration with the Nazis.

In the same month Francken also came in stormy waters after the leaking of old social media posts with allegedly homophobic statements, which Theo Francken vehemently denied, and a Facebook post in where he questioned the "added value" that immigrants from Morocco, Congo and Algeria bring to the Belgian economy. Subsequently, Theo Francken apologised in the federal parliament.

In May 2017 Francken made several tweets accusing the NGO Médecins Sans Frontières of human trafficking in connection with their operation to transport to provide aid to illegal migrants picked up from rubber boats off the coast of Libya trying to reach the EU without entry visa. In September 2017 a Sudanese delegation was invited to Brussels to identify undocumented immigrants that refused to apply for asylum in Belgium Cooperation with the Sudanese regime was already an issue, but controversy spiked in December of that year after two migrants who had returned allegedly reported being tortured upon arrival in Sudan. However, after due investigation by Belgium's independent Commissariat-General for Refugees and Stateless persons (CGRS), “no proof“ of the allegations of torture could be found. Also in September, Francken had to apologise after using the hashtag #opkuisen, Dutch for "cleaning up", in a tweet about the arrest of illegal immigrants who had been camping at the North Station of Brussels and the adjacent Maximiliaanpark.

After the 2017 Catalan independence referendum Francken commented that Catalonians, including Carles Puigdemont, could ask for asylum in Belgium. The Prime Minister then asked the Secretary not to add fuel to the fire.

In January 2019, one month after his departure as Secretary of State for Asylum, Migration and Administrative Simplification, Francken was questioned as a witness by Belgian judicial authorities in connection with an investigation into possible fraud involving humanitarian visas by one of his closest aides. The suspect, Melikan Kucam, was one of several external people entrusted to advise Francken's cabinet with regard to identifying Christian Syrian refugees from war affected regions in Syria that could be offered humanitarian visa from Belgium. Kucam was accused of asking money to put Syrian Christians on the list. However, he denied any such actions and was released from preliminary custody in October 2019. As of December, the investigation is still pending.

== Personal life ==
Francken is married with two children and lives in Lubbeek. Francken is a Catholic and has stated that Christianity is important to Western society. In 2022, he walked the Camino de Santiago pilgrimage.

In 2014, Francken was the target of death threats from someone claiming to be an extremist Muslim along with fellow N-VA minister Jan Jambon. He received police protection as a result of the incident.
