= Axel Ronse =

Belgian politician (born 1981)

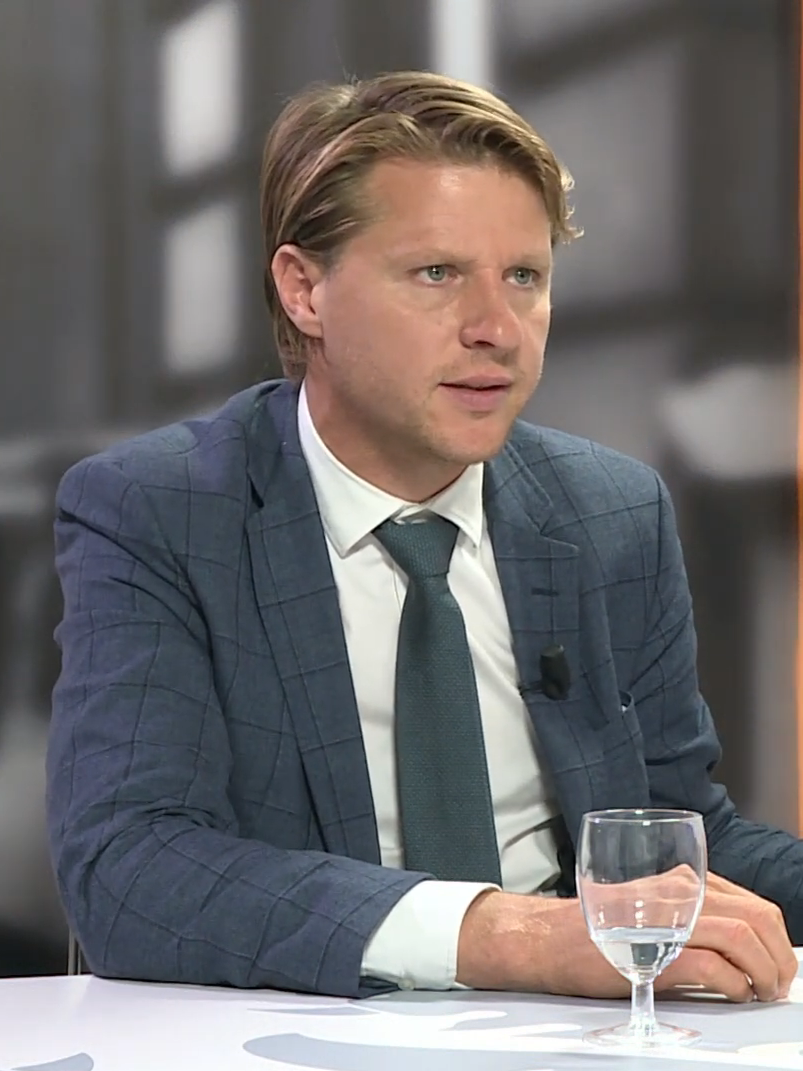
Axel Ronse in 2019

Axel Ronse (born June 20, 1981) is a Belgian-Flemish politician and a member of the N-VA party.

Ronse graduated with a degree in philosophy from Ghent University followed by an MBA in business administration at the Vlerick Business School. Since the 2014 Belgian regional elections, he has been a member of the Flemish Parliament for the West Flanders constituency and was re-elected in 2019. Since 2018, he has also served as a municipal councilor in Kortrijk.
