= Mauro Michielsen =

Belgian politician (born 2005)

- Michielsen in 2025

Member of the Senate
- Incumbent
- Assumed office 13 February 2026

Personal details
- Born: 21 January 2005 (age 21)
- Party: Vooruit

Mauro Michielsen (born 21 January 2005) is a Belgian politician serving as a member of the Senate since 2026. He is the youngest-ever member of the Senate. He has been a municipal councillor of Leuven since 2024. He previously served as chairman of the Flemish Student Council.
