= New Flemish Alliance =

Flemish political party in Belgium

New Flemish Alliance Nieuw-Vlaamse Alliantie
- Abbreviation: N-VA
- Chairperson: Valerie Van Peel
- Deputy Chairperson: Frieda Gijbels; Maaike De Vreese
- Founder: Geert Bourgeois
- Founded: 13 October 2001; 25 years ago
- Split from: People's Union
- Headquarters: Koningsstraat 47, bus 6 BE-1000 Brussels
- Youth wing: Jong N-VA
- Membership (2018): ▲45,000
- Ideology: Flemish nationalism; Liberal conservatism
- Political position: Centre-right to right-wing
- Regional affiliation: Christian Group
- European affiliation: European Free Alliance
- European Parliament group: Greens/EFA (2009–2014); ECR Group (since 2014)
- International affiliation: International Democracy Union
- Colours: Gold; Black
- Slogan: De verandering werkt. ('Change works'); Voor Vlaanderen. Voor Vooruitgang. ('For Flanders. For Progress') (2019)
- Chamber of Representatives: 24 / 87 (Flemish seats)
- Senate: 9 / 35 (Flemish seats)
- Flemish Parliament: 31 / 124
- Brussels Parliament: 2 / 17 (Flemish seats)
- European Parliament: 3 / 12 (Flemish seats)
- Flemish Provincial Councils: 48 / 175
- Benelux Parliament: 4 / 21 (Belgian seats)

Party flag
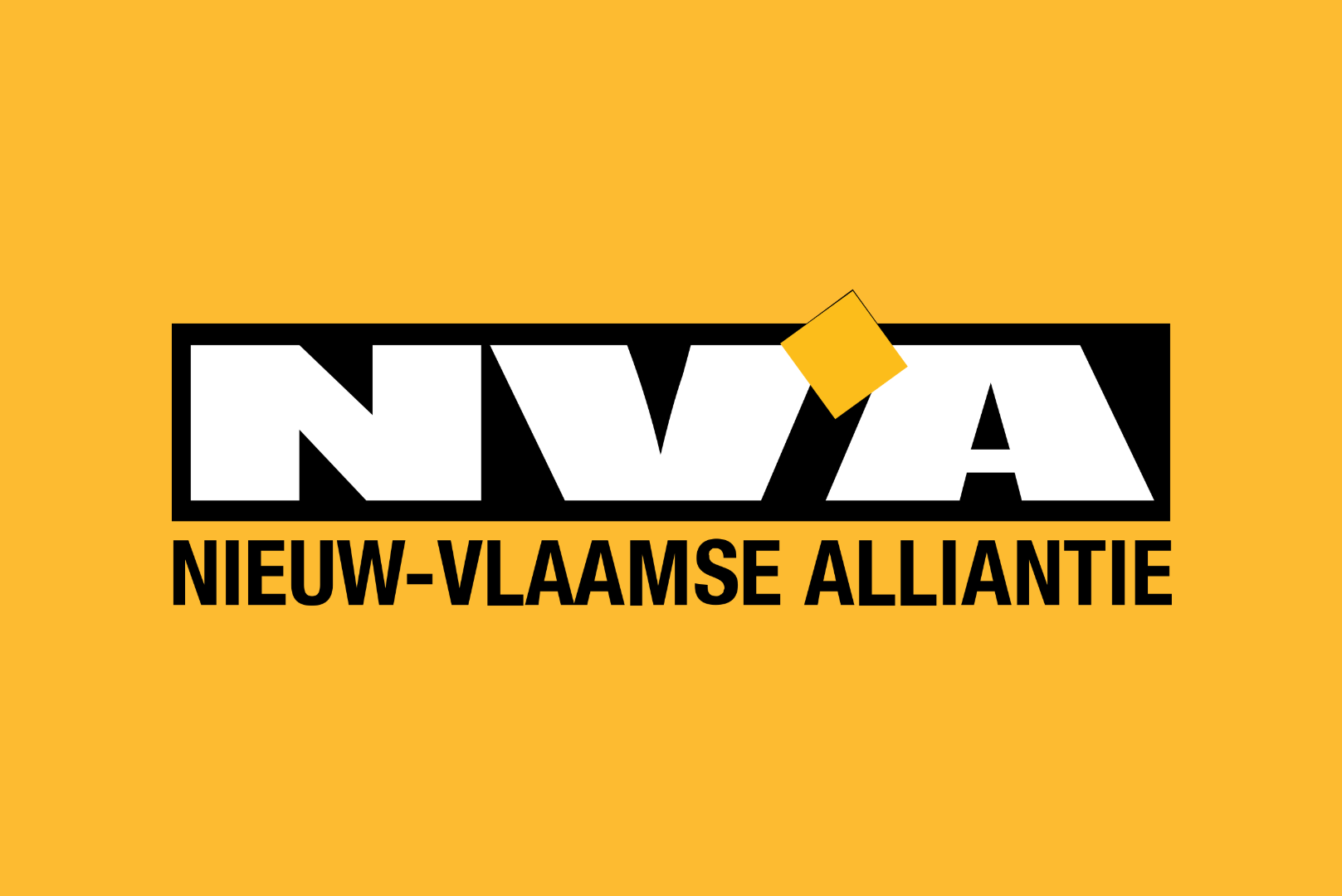

Website
- n-va.be

The New Flemish Alliance (Dutch: Nieuw-Vlaamse Alliantie [ˌniu ˈvlaːmsə ʔɑliˈjɑn(t)si], N-VA) is a Flemish nationalist, conservative, and liberal-conservative political party in Belgium. The party was established in 2001 by the right-leaning faction of the centrist-nationalist People's Union (VU). The N-VA is a regionalist and confederalist movement that self-identifies with the promotion of civic nationalism. Within the Flemish Movement, the party strives for the peaceful and gradual transformation of Belgium into a confederal union. In recent years it has become the largest party of Flanders as well as of Belgium as a whole, and it participated in the 2014–18 Belgian Government until 9 December 2018. On 3 February 2025, at the end of the 2024–2025 Belgian government formation, former N-VA Chairman and then Mayor of Antwerp Bart De Wever became prime minister of Belgium, becoming the first member of a Flemish nationalist party to head the country's government.

The N-VA was established as a centre-right party with the main objective of working towards furthering Flemish autonomy and redefining Belgium as a confederal country through gradually obtaining more powers for both Belgian communities separately with the belief that this will pave the way for eventual Flemish independence. During its early years, the N-VA mostly followed the platform of the former VU by characterising itself as a big tent party, with Flemish nationalism as its central theme. Furthermore, it emphasized a pragmatic and non-revolutionary image (as opposed to the far-right character of the other main Flemish pro-separatist party Vlaams Belang) in order to legitimise increased Flemish autonomy. The party also espoused non-interventionalist and pro-individual freedom messages in its original platform.

In subsequent years, the N-VA moved to the right and adopted a distinctly conservative identity under the leadership of Bart De Wever, who succeeded the founding leader Geert Bourgeois. The party used to be pro-Europeanist, and previously advocated deepening ties with the European Union (EU) which the N-VA regarded as an important means to give Flanders more international influence, but has since shifted to a "Eurorealist" or "Eurocritical" stance by calling for more democratic transparency within the EU, opposing a Federal Superstate and wants reforms made to the Eurozone and common EU asylum policy. The party is known for its insistence on the exclusive use of Dutch, Flanders' sole official language, in dealings with government agencies. The N-VA advocates economic liberalism and immediate tax reductions to stimulate the economy. It also supports stricter law and order and controlled immigration policies, with stronger measures to integrate immigrants in Flanders.

A leading member of the European Free Alliance (EFA), since the 2014 European Parliament election, the N-VA has sat with the European Conservatives and Reformists (ECR) parliamentary group in the European Parliament. The party announced the creation of a Walloon branch in 2024, although it did not manage to win any seats in the Belgian elections of that same year.

== History ==
=== Fall of the People's Union ===
The N-VA stems from the right-leaning faction of the People's Union (Dutch: Volksunie, VU), a Belgian political party and broad electoral alliance of Flemish nationalists from both sides of the political spectrum with the N-VA's founders largely encompassing the more centre-right and pro-independence wing of the VU.

Towards the end of the 20th century, with a steadily declining electorate and the majority of the party's federalist agenda implemented, friction between several wings of the People's Union emerged. In the beginning of the 1990s, Bert Anciaux became party president and led the party in an ever more progressive direction, combining the social-liberal and social democratic ideas of his iD21-movement with the regionalist course of the People's Union. These experiments were opposed by the more traditional right-wing party base. Many of the VU's more ardent national-conservative members defected to the Vlaams Blok after becoming disgruntled with direction of the party, prompting a further decline in support. Around this time, VU member Geert Bourgeois, de facto leader of the VU's traditionalist and centre-right nationalist wing, put together the so-called "Oranjehofgroep" (which would go on to become the bedrock of the N-VA) which included fellow VU members Frieda Brepoels, Eric Defoort, Ben Weyts and Bart De Wever. The Oranjehofgroep opposed the direction in which the party was being taken by Anciaux and wanted the VU to pursue a more conservative, Flemish nationalist and separatist direction, while the wing helmed by Anciaux was looking to merge the Volksunie with its progressive programme with another political party.

Tension rose towards the end of the decade, as Geert Bourgeois was elected chairman by party members, in preference to the incumbent and progressive Patrik Vankrunkelsven who belonged to the iD21 wing. Factions subsequently clashed multiple times, over the future course of the party and possible support for current state reform negotiations. On 13 October 2001, the party openly split into three factions: the progressive wing around Bert Anciaux, which would later become the Spirit party; the conservative nationalist wing around Geert Bourgeois; and a centrist group opposing the imminent split. An internal referendum was held on the future course of the party. The right wing gained a substantial plurality of 47% and inherited the party infrastructure. Since no faction got an absolute majority, however, the name Volksunie could no longer be used under Belgian constitutional law and the VU was dissolved. The centre-right orientated faction of the VU went on to found the N-VA while the remaining centre-left faction reorganized itself as Spirit and the centrist-liberal wing mostly folded into the Open VLD.

=== Foundation and the election threshold ===
In the autumn of 2001, the New Flemish Alliance (Dutch: Nieuw-Vlaamse Alliantie, N-VA) was officially registered. Seven members of parliament from the People's Union joined the new party. The new party council created a party manifesto and a statement of principles. The first party congress was held in May 2002, voting on a party program and permanent party structures. Geert Bourgeois was elected chairman. The N-VA initially continued some of the VU's former policies.

The party participated in elections for the first time in the 2003 federal elections, but struggled with the election threshold of 5%. This threshold was only reached in West Flanders, the constituency of Geert Bourgeois. With only one federal representative and no senator, the party lost government funding and faced irrelevance.

=== Cartel with CD&V ===
In February 2004, the N-VA entered into an electoral alliance, commonly known in Belgium as a cartel, with the Christian Democratic and Flemish (CD&V) party, the traditionally largest party, which was then in opposition. They joined forces in the regional elections in 2004 and won. Both parties joined the new Flemish government, led by CD&V leader Yves Leterme. Geert Bourgeois became a minister, and Bart De Wever became the new party leader in October 2004.

The cartel was briefly broken when the former right-wing liberal Jean-Marie Dedecker left the Open Flemish Liberals and Democrats (Open VLD) and entered the N-VA on behalf of the party executive. However, the party congress did not put Dedecker on the election list, instead preferring to continue the cartel with CD&V, who had strongly opposed placing him on a joint cartel list. Dedecker saw this as a vote of no confidence, and left the party after only 10 days, to form his own party, List Dedecker (LDD). Deputy leader Brepoels, who supported Dedecker, stepped down from the party board afterwards.

In the Belgian federal election of 2007, the CD&V/N-VA cartel won a major victory again, with a campaign focusing on good governance, state reform and the division of the electoral district Brussels-Halle-Vilvoorde. The N-VA won five seats in the Chamber of Representatives and two seats in the Senate. Yves Leterme initiated coalition talks, which repeatedly stalled (see 2007–2008 Belgian government formation). On 20 March 2008, a new federal government was finally assembled. N-VA did not join this government, but gave its support pending state reform.

The cartel ended definitively on 24 September 2008, due to lack of progression in state reform matters and a different strategy on future negotiations. N-VA left the Flemish Government and gave up its support of Leterme at the federal level.

=== Mainstream party ===
In the regional elections of June 2009, N-VA won an unexpected 13% of the votes, making them the winner of the elections, along with their old cartel partner CD&V. N-VA subsequently joined the government, led by Kris Peeters (CD&V). Bart De Wever chose to remain party leader and appointed Geert Bourgeois and Philippe Muyters as ministers in the Flemish Government and Jan Peumans as speaker of the Flemish Parliament.

Ahead of the 2010 Belgian federal election, all of the other Belgian parties distanced themselves from the N-VA resulting in De Wever accusing the Belgian political establishment of plotting a new cordon sanitaire against his party. In its election program, the N-VA advocated confederalism for Belgium maximum authority and responsibility for the different regions of the country, whereby the Flemish and Walloon regions and communities are rewarded for good policies and punished for bad policies. The party also campaigned for revisions to Belgium's finance laws and reforms to the health and education systems. De Wever also called on all the Flemish parties to work together to push for confederalism and campaigned for the idea that no government formation in Belgium should exclude a Flemish majority.

The N-VA made a major breakthrough and won the elections with just under 28% of the Flemish votes in the Chamber (31% in the Senate), making it the largest party in Flanders and Belgium. The party acquired 27 seats in the Chamber. As a result, N-VA became the dominant political formation in the Flemish political landscape and took the place that CD&V had occupied for decades as the largest Flemish party. After the election, some media commentators attributed the party's result to the style of De Wever while others argued the N-VA was able to win over conservative and Flemish nationalist supporters of the Vlaams Belang who had supported the VB out of necessity as the main Flemish separatist party but regarded it as extreme by offering a moderate alternative, as well as voters of the Open VLD and CD&V who felt those parties had moved to the left and had not performed well in government.

The N-VA also performed strongly during the 2012 Belgian local elections but was criticized by political opponents for featuring former Vlaams Belang and Vlaams Blok politicians such as Jurgen Ceder and Karim Van Overmeire on their local lists. De Wever responded by stating that only a small number of VB politicians were running as N-VA candidates. The N-VA emerged as the largest party in Antwerp with De Wever being elected as mayor.

=== Michel I government ===
During the 2014 Belgian federal election, the N-VA again emerged as the largest party in both Flanders and Belgium as a whole. In the aftermath of the election, King Philippe nominated De Wever as informateur tasking him with forming a government.

After five months of discussions, a coalition between CD&V, Open Vld, MR and N-VA was formed on 7 October 2014, with Walloon MR politician Charles Michel appointed as Prime Minister of Belgium.

In December 2018, a political crisis emerged over whether to sign the Global Compact for Migration; N-VA was against this, whereas the other three parties in the federal government supported it. On 4 December 2018, Charles Michel announced that the issue would be taken to parliament for a vote. On 5 December, parliament voted 106 to 36 in favor of backing the agreement. Michel stated that he would endorse the pact on behalf of parliament, not on behalf of the divided government. Consequently, N-VA quit the federal government; the other three parties continued as a minority government (Michel II).

=== 2019 to 2025 ===
During the 2019 federal elections, the party again polled in first place in the Flemish region. However, it also saw a decline in vote share for the first time, falling to 25.6% of the Flemish vote with commentators arguing this was due to a revival of the Vlaams Belang.

Ahead of the 2024 federal elections, the N-VA announced it would run candidates in Wallonia for the first time. The party did not see any candidates elected in French-speaking districts, but it remained in first place in the Flemish region in the Federal Parliament despite polls indicating it would be overtaken by Vlaams Belang while it finished joint-first with the VB in the Flemish Parliament.

=== 2025 to present ===
Early 2025, Bart De Wever became Belgian Prime Minister, after which Steven Vandeput was appointed as interim president until the next party elections.

== Foundation and ideology ==
The New Flemish Alliance is a relatively young political party, founded in the autumn of 2001. Being one of the successors of the People's Union (Volksunie) party which existed from 1954–2001, it is, however, based on an established political tradition. The N-VA works towards the same goal as its Volksunie predecessor: to redefine Flemish nationalism in a contemporary setting. The N-VA's leader Bart De Wever calls himself a conservative and a nationalist. In its early years, the N-VA argued for a Flemish Republic as a member state of a democratic European confederation. In its initial mission statement, the party stated that the challenges of the 21st century can best be answered by strong communities and by well-developed international co-operation, a position which reflected in their tagline: "Necessary in Flanders, useful in Europe." (Dutch: Nodig in Vlaanderen, nuttig in Europa.)

Presently, the N-VA is generally characterised by political scientists and journalists as conservative, conservative liberal, and economically liberal and positioned towards the right-wing of the political spectrum with Flemish nationalism linked to the core of its policy ideas and messages. The N-VA initially advocated deepening ties with the European Union but in recent years it has been defined as moderately eurosceptic and growing more EU-critical.

During the N-VA's early years, a label for the political orientation for the party was difficult to find. Although the N-VA articulated its ideology as centre-right, it also borrowed from its Volksunie predecessor by presenting itself as a big tent or a catch-all party and a socially liberal nationalist movement that combined left- and right-wing policies but focused on Flemish issues above all else. The N-VA also summed up its initial platform with the motto Evolution, not Revolution, arguing for a more pragmatic and less radical approach to Flemish nationalism. The N-VA first argued that a Flemish nationalist party was needed in the Belgian Federal Parliament both to represent the Flemish people and to work with politicians from all Belgian communities to redefine Belgium as a confederal rather than a federal state by securing more autonomy and political powers for both the Flemish and Walloon regions of Belgium. This strategy assumed that through successive transfers of powers from the federal level to both regions on the one hand, and the European Union on the other, the Belgian state will gradually become obsolete.

In its 2009 election programme, the N-VA described itself as economically liberal and ecologically green. The party supported public transport, open source software, renewable energy and taxing cars by the number of kilometres driven. It wanted more aid for developing countries and more compulsory measures to require that immigrants learn Dutch. The party has generally been supportive of LGBT rights and backed same-sex marriage in Belgium. It calls for measures to protect weaker members of society but also robust welfare reform and limits to welfare benefits to encourage people back into work and reduce unemployment.

Within the decade of its founding, the N-VA has shifted from a big tent to a conservative party by basing some of its socio-economic policies on that of the British Conservative Party. Political scientist Glen Duerr has described the N-VA's current position as evolving to somewhere between that of Vlaams Belang and CD&V, defining itself as a nationalist and conservative party while rejecting radical populism. The N-VA has also been described as part of the "sub-state nationalist" family of parties similar to the Scottish National Party and the Catalan National Call for the Republic and Junts parties with its regionalist platform while also differing from other independence movements in this category like the SNP which tend to hold progressive social and economic agendas since the N-VA promotes more neoliberal policies and stances on immigration and multiculturalism that are more in common with right-leaning European parties. Belgian professor Ico Maly has described the N-VA's current ideology as drawing on the intellectual beliefs of the party's leader Bart de Wever which he terms as "scientific nationalism" that distances the N-VA from the more far-right nationalism advocated by the Vlaams Belang, but on the other, leads the N-VA to use more cultural arguments compared to parties like the SNP such as defending Western values and an ethnically defined Flemish identity.

Since 2014, the N-VA has been described as continuing to move ideologically further to the right under the influence of Bart De Wever and Theo Francken by adopting tougher stances on immigration, integration of minorities, requirements to obtain Belgian citizenship, law and order, national security and repatriation of foreign born criminals and illegal immigrants. In 2015, German weekly Die Zeit published a list of 39 successful radical political parties in Europe. The paper described N-VA as right-wing populist and separatist because it reduces complex political problems to territorial issues. N-VA responded that "foreign media find the party difficult to place, so they just label us as extremists." Some commentators have attributed these shifts as a response to a revival in support for the Flemish nationalist Vlaams Belang. In contrast to other Belgian parties, the N-VA is more critical of the cordon sanitaire placed on the Vlaams Belang party and recently has been more open to negotiating with the VB, although accepting former Vlaams Blok/Vlaams Belang members as defectors into the N-VA still remains controversial within some ranks of the party.

=== Flemish nationalism ===
The N-VA is part of the broader Flemish nationalist movement and describes its beliefs as combining civic and cultural nationalism. The party promotes what it calls inclusive nationalism not defined by revolutionary or racist sentiments in which newcomers can become part of the Flemish community through compulsory learning of the Dutch language, Flemish history and Western values. In its current mission statement, the party claims that political divides in Belgium are not a xenophobic conflict but due to the political structure, arguing that Belgium has effectively been divided into two separate democracies since the 20th Century. The N-VA believes the solution is to redefine the federal Belgian state as a confederal union by means of transferring powers separately to both communities with a smaller government in Brussels that handles core issues like defense and security, while the Flemish and Walloon regions are given more decision-making abilities. The N-VA argues that Flanders should pursue more independent economic, taxation and foreign policies which it believes will lead to gradual Flemish secessionism. The party also supports a review into financial transfers from Flanders to Brussels and the Wallonia region, arguing that such a policy threatens solidarity between different linguistic groups and has been a burden on Flemish tax payers.

=== Migration ===
The party calls for more strict immigration policies and reforms to asylum laws on its platform, proritizing knowledge-based immigration similar to the Canadian model while significantly reducing unskilled immigration and including a compulsory "integration contract" for immigrants to learn Dutch and undergo a values and social skills test before receiving Belgian citizenship. The N-VA also argues that dual nationals should be stripped of their citizenship if they are convicted of terrorism and other serious crimes and for the removal of illegal immigrants. On asylum, the N-VA calls for a "humane but strict asylum and migration policy" giving more support for refugees closer to their home region while arguing that anyone who enters European territory illegally will automatically be denied asylum. The party also established a new government position of Minister for Integration in the Flemish Government after becoming the largest party in the Flemish Parliament. In Federal politics, N-VA MP Theo Francken who served as Belgium's Secretary of State for Asylum and Migration sought to tighten laws on family migration and was noted for overseeing a record deportation of illegal immigrants and foreigners with criminal backgrounds. This policy made him the most popular politician in public opinion polls. The party is also critical of multiculturalism, arguing that it prevents inclusiveness and social cohesion among the population, and has accused French-speaking parties of pushing mass immigration and multicultural policies onto Flanders through Belgian state politics. In 2018, the party opposed the UN Global Compact for Migration and subsequently withdrew its participation in the Belgian government in protest of its passing. Some commentators have attributed these shifts as a response to a revival in support for the Flemish nationalist Vlaams Belang, which also campaigned against the Migration Compact. The N-VA also supports increased spending and resources for the police and border forces, as well as more resources for counter-terrorism and national security efforts.

=== Climate change ===
The party has a what it calls a ecorealism stance, arguing for constructive methods and the use of green technology and expanding Belgium's nuclear power stations to mitigate climate change.

However, the N-VA voted at European level against the foundations of the European Green Deal, namely against an extension of the European Union Emissions Trading System to more sectors and against a European carbon border tax. At the Flemish level, the N-VA and the Flemish government are in favor of a 40% reduction in emissions by 2030, while the EU is calling for a 47% reduction, an objective for which Brussels and Wallonia do commit.

=== Foreign policy ===
In terms of foreign policy, the N-VA's stance on the European Union began as strongly pro-European in character (which it regarded as an important means of gaining legitimacy for Flemish nationalism on an international stage); in 2010, the party called for "an ever stronger and more united Europe." However, the party has since moved in a Eurocritical direction and takes an opposition stance towards EU integration by arguing EU member states should have the right to self-determination. The N-VA calls for less interference at national decision-making levels and for the right for EU members to maintain their cultural identity, more democratic reform of the EU and rejecting a Federal EU Superstate, and arguing that economically unstable nations should leave the Eurozone. The party is critical of the EU's stance on illegal immigration (in particular its handling of the migrant crisis) and the role played by NGOs in picking up migrants. The N-VA argues that the EU should emulate the Australian model of border protection to reinforce its external border and work with nations outside of Europe to stem the flow of illegal migrants arriving by sea.

The N-VA supports continued Belgian participation in NATO and for military cooperation between European states.

The party has supported sending military and humanitarian aid to Ukraine following the Russian invasion of Ukraine and sent a delegation of members to meet with Ukrainian officials in 2022.

=== Other policies ===
On economic policy, the N-VA calls for reduced national debts and balanced budget in the Flemish and Federal Parliaments. It has generally advocated for free-market policies and limits on certain government spending. It also supports increased trade and business investment for Flanders.

The N-VA also supports abolishing the Belgian Senate.

== International affiliations ==
At European level, the N-VA is part of the European Free Alliance (EFA), a European political party consisting of regionalist, pro-independence and minority interest political parties, of which the People's Union was a founder member. Since the EFA tends to contain parties on the left, the N-VA stands out due to its more centre-right orientation. During the 7th European Parliament of 2009–2014, the N-VA was a member of The Greens–European Free Alliance (Greens/EFA) group in the European Parliament. However, following the 2014 European elections, the N-VA announced it was moving to a new group and chose the conservative and eurosceptic European Conservatives and Reformists (ECR) over the Alliance of Liberals and Democrats for Europe. Since 2014, the N-VA has served on the bureau for the ECR group and sits alongside the Czech Civic Democratic Party, the Sweden Democrats, Brothers of Italy, Poland's Law & Justice and formerly the British Conservative Party in the European Parliament.

The N-VA is a member of the International Democracy Union.

== Party chairmen ==
Name		Portrait	From	To
1	Geert Bourgeois		2001	2004
2	Bart De Wever		2004	2025
3	Steven Vandeput		2025	2025
4	Valerie Van Peel		2025	present

== Faction leaders ==
- Party chairman: Steven Vandeput
- Chamber of Representatives: Axel Ronse
- Senate: Karl Vanlouwe
- Flemish Parliament: Philippe Muyters
- European Parliament: Johan Van Overtveldt
- Brussels Parliament: Gilles Verstraeten

== Electorate ==
In the federal elections in 2003, N-VA received 3.1% of the votes, but won only one seat in the federal parliament. In February 2004, they formed an electoral alliance (cartel) with the Christian Democratic and Flemish party (CD&V). The cartel won the elections for the Flemish Parliament. The N-VA received a total of 6 seats. However, on 21 September 2008 the N-VA lost its faith in the federal government and the following day minister Geert Bourgeois resigned. In a press conference he confirmed the end of the CD&V/N-VA cartel.

In the 2004 European elections, N-VA had one MEP elected as part of the cartel with CD&V.

In the 10 June 2007 federal elections, the cartel won 30 out of 150 seats in the Chamber of Representatives and 9 out of 40 seats in the Senate.

In the regional elections of 11 June 2009, N-VA (now on its own after the split of the cartel with CD&V) won an unexpected 13% of the votes, making them the winner of the elections along with their former cartel partner. In the 2009 European elections held on the same day, the N-VA had one MEP elected.

In the 2010 federal elections, N-VA became the largest party of Flanders and of Belgium altogether.

In the 2014 federal elections, N-VA increased their dominant position, taking votes and seats from the far-right Flemish Interest. In the simultaneous 2014 regional elections and 2014 European elections, the N-VA also became the largest party in the Flemish Parliament and in the Belgian delegation to the European Parliament.

In the 2019 federal elections, the party remained in first place in the Chamber of Representatives, European Parliament and Flemish Parliament, but saw a decline of their vote share for the first time, obtaining 16.03% of the votes in the Federal Parliament. With a decline of 24.7% of their votes compared to 2014, the N-VA suffered the biggest election defeat of any Flemish government party in the last fifty years. The decline in votes was in part due to a sudden upsurge in support for the Flemish Interest.

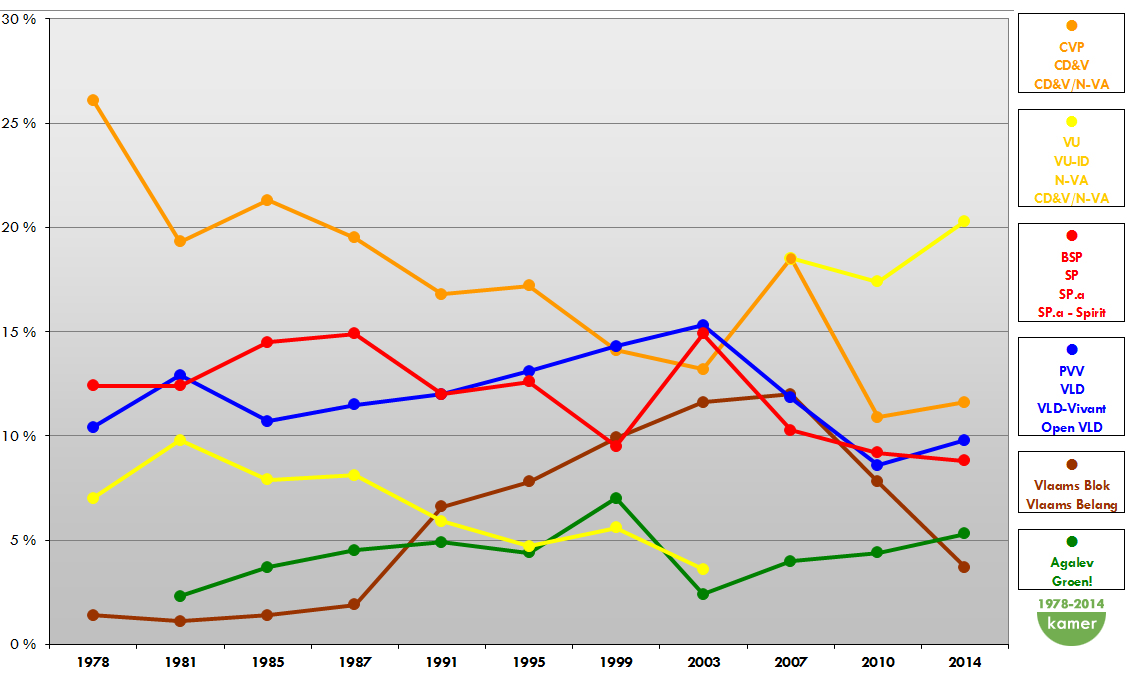
The six biggest Flemish political parties and their results for the House of Representatives (Kamer). From 1978 to 2014, in percentages of the total vote in Belgium.

== Election results ==
=== Chamber of Representatives ===
Election	Votes	%	Seats	+/-	Government
2003	201,399	3.1	1 / 150		Opposition
2007 (Note: In coalition with CD&V; 30 seats won in total.)	1,234,950	18.5	5 / 150	▲4	Opposition
2010	1,135,617	17.4	27 / 150	▲22	Opposition
2014	1,366,073	20.3	33 / 150	▲6	Coalition (2014–2018)
2014	1,366,073	20.3	33 / 150	▲6	Opposition (2018–2019)
2019	1,086,787	16.0	25 / 150	▼8	Opposition
2024	1,167,061	16.7	24 / 150	▼1	Coalition

=== Senate ===
Election	Votes	%	Seats	+/-
2003	200,273	3.1	0 / 71	
2007 (Note: In coalition with CD&V; 14 seats won in total.)	1,287,389	19.4	2 / 71	▲2
2010	1,268,780	19.6	14 / 71	▲12
2014			12 / 60	▼2
2019			9 / 60	▼3
2024			10 / 60	▲1

=== Regional ===
==== Brussels Parliament ====
Election	Votes	%		Seats	+/-	Government
Election	Votes	D.E.C.	Overall	Seats	+/-	Government
2004 (Note: In coalition with CD&V; 3 seats won in total.)	10,482	16.8 (#4)		0 / 89		Opposition
2009	2,586	5.0 (#6)		1 / 89	▲1	Opposition
2014	9,085	17.0 (#4)		3 / 89	▲2	Opposition
2019	12,578	18.0 (#4)		3 / 89	0	Opposition
2024	9.571	11.9 (#3)		2 / 89	▼1	Opposition

==== Flemish Parliament ====
Election	Votes	%	Seats	+/-	Government
2004 (Note: In coalition with CD&V; 35 seats won in total.)	1,060,580	26.1 (#1)	6 / 124		Coalition
2009	537,040	13.1 (#5)	16 / 124	▲10	Coalition
2014	1,339,946	31.9 (#1)	43 / 124	▲27	Coalition
2019	1,052,252	24.8 (#1)	35 / 124	▼8	Coalition
2024	1,045,607	23.9 (#1)	31 / 124	▼4	Coalition

=== European Parliament ===
Election	List leader	Votes	%		Seats	+/-	EP Group
Election	List leader	Votes	D.E.C.	Overall	Seats	+/-	EP Group
2004 (Note: In coalition with CD&V; 4 seats won in total.)	Jean-Luc Dehaene	1,131,119	28.15 (#1)	17.43	1 / 24	New	EPP-ED
2009	Frieda Brepoels	402,545	9.88 (#5)	6.13	1 / 22	0	Greens/EFA
2014	Johan Van Overtveldt	1,123,363	26.67 (#1)	16.79	4 / 21	▲3	ECR
2019	Geert Bourgeois	1,123,355	22.44 (#1)	14.17	3 / 21	▼1	ECR
2024	Johan Van Overtveldt	995,868	22.94 (#2)	13.96	3 / 22	0	ECR

== Representation ==
=== European politics ===
N-VA holds three seats in the tenth European Parliament (2024-2029) for the Dutch-speaking electoral college.

European Parliament
Name	In office	Parliamentary group
Johan Van Overtveldt	2019–present	European Conservatives and Reformists
Assita Kanko	2019–present	European Conservatives and Reformists
Kris Van Dijck	2024–present	European Conservatives and Reformists

=== Federal politics ===
Belgian federal government De Wever (2025-present)

Federal Government De Wever Incumbent
Name	Function
Bart De Wever	Prime Minister of the Belgian Government
Jan Jambon	Federal Deputy Prime Minister Federal Minister of Finance, Pensions, responsible for the National Lottery and the Federal Cultural Institutions
Theo Francken	Federal Minister of Defence, responsible for Foreign Trade
Anneleen Van Bossuyt	Federal Minister for Asylum and Migration and Social Integration, responsible for Major Cities Policy

Chamber of Representatives (2024–2029)
Constituency	Name	Notes
Antwerp	Bart De Wever	
Antwerp	Peter De Roover	floor leader
Antwerp	Sophie De Wit	
Antwerp	Michael Freilich	
Antwerp	Koen Metsu	
Antwerp	Mireille Colson	
Antwerp	Dorien Cuylaerts	
Antwerp	Bert Wollants	
East Flanders	Anneleen Van Bossuyt	
East Flanders	Peter Buysrogge	
East Flanders	Lotte Peeters	
East Flanders	Christoph D'Haese	
East Flanders	Kathleen Depoorter	
West Flanders	Jean-Marie Dedecker	Independent seated with the N-VA faction
West Flanders	Maaike De Vreese	
West Flanders	Axel Ronse	
West Flanders	Charlotte Verkeyn	
Flemish Brabant	Jeroen Bergers	
Flemish Brabant	Eva Demesmaeker	
Flemish Brabant	Darya Safai	
Flemish Brabant	Kristien Van Vaerenbergh	
Limburg (Belgium)	Steven Vandeput	
Limburg (Belgium)	Frieda Gijbels	
Limburg (Belgium)	Wouter Raskin	

Senate (2024–2029)
Type	Name
Community senator	Inge Brocken
Community senator	Arnout Coel
Community senator	Koen Dillen
Community senator	Andries Gryffroy
Community senator	Sander Loones
Community senator	Andy Pieters
Community senator	Nadia Sminate
Community senator	Karl Vanlouwe
Co-opted senator	An Capoen
Co-opted senator	Gilles Verstraeten

=== Regional politics ===
==== Flemish Government ====
Flemish Government Diependaele Incumbent
Name	Function
Matthias Diependaele	Minister-President of the Flemish Government and Flemish Minister for Economy, Innovation, Industry, Foreign Affairs, Digitalisation and Facility Management
Ben Weyts	Vice minister-president of the Flemish Government and Flemish Minister for Budget and Finance, Flemish Periphery, Immovable Heritage, Animal Welfare
Zuhal Demir	Flemish Minister for Education, Employment, Justice and Enforcement
Annick De Ridder	Flemish Minister for Mobility, Public Works, Ports and Sport
Cieltje Van Achter	Flesmish Minister for Brussels and Media

===== Former Flemish Ministers =====
- Geert Bourgeois, former Minister-President (2014–2019) and Minister (2004–2014)
- Liesbeth Homans, former Minister-President (2019) and Minister (2014–2019)
- Philippe Muyters, former Minister (2009–2019)
- Jan Jambon, former Flemish Prime Minister (2019-2024)

==== Flemish Parliament ====
Flemish Parliament (2024–2029)
Constituency	Name	Notes
Antwerp	Jan Jambon	
Antwerp	Annick De Ridder	
Antwerp	Paul Van Miert	
Antwerp	Liesbeth Homans	
Antwerp	Freya Perdaens	
Antwerp	Sofie Joosen	
Antwerp	Koen Dillen	
Antwerp	Philippe Muyters	Floor leader
Antwerp	Sanne Van Looy	
Antwerp	Els van Doesburg	
East Flanders	Matthias Diependaele	
East Flanders	Sarah Smeyers	
East Flanders	Koen Daniëls	
East Flanders	Tomas Roggeman	
East Flanders	Inge Brocken	
East Flanders	Andries Gryffroy	
Flemish Brabant	Ben Weyts	
Flemish Brabant	Nadia Sminate	
Flemish Brabant	Katrien Houtmeyers	
Flemish Brabant	Ine Tombeur	
Flemish Brabant	Arnout Coel	
West Flanders	Sander Loones	
West Flanders	Eva Ryde	
West Flanders	Bert Maertens	
West Flanders	Griet Vanryckegem	
West Flanders	Gijs Degrande	
Limburg (Belgium)	Zuhal Demir	
Limburg (Belgium)	Karolien Grosemans	
Limburg (Belgium)	Tom Seurs	
Limburg (Belgium)	Andy Pieters	
Brussels-Capital Region	Karl Vanlouwe	

==== Parliament of the Brussels-Capital Region ====
Brussels Regional Parliament (2024–2029)
Name	Notes
Cieltje Van Achter	
Matthias Vanden Borre	
