= Gaston Saint-Paul de Sinçay =

Belgian industrialist

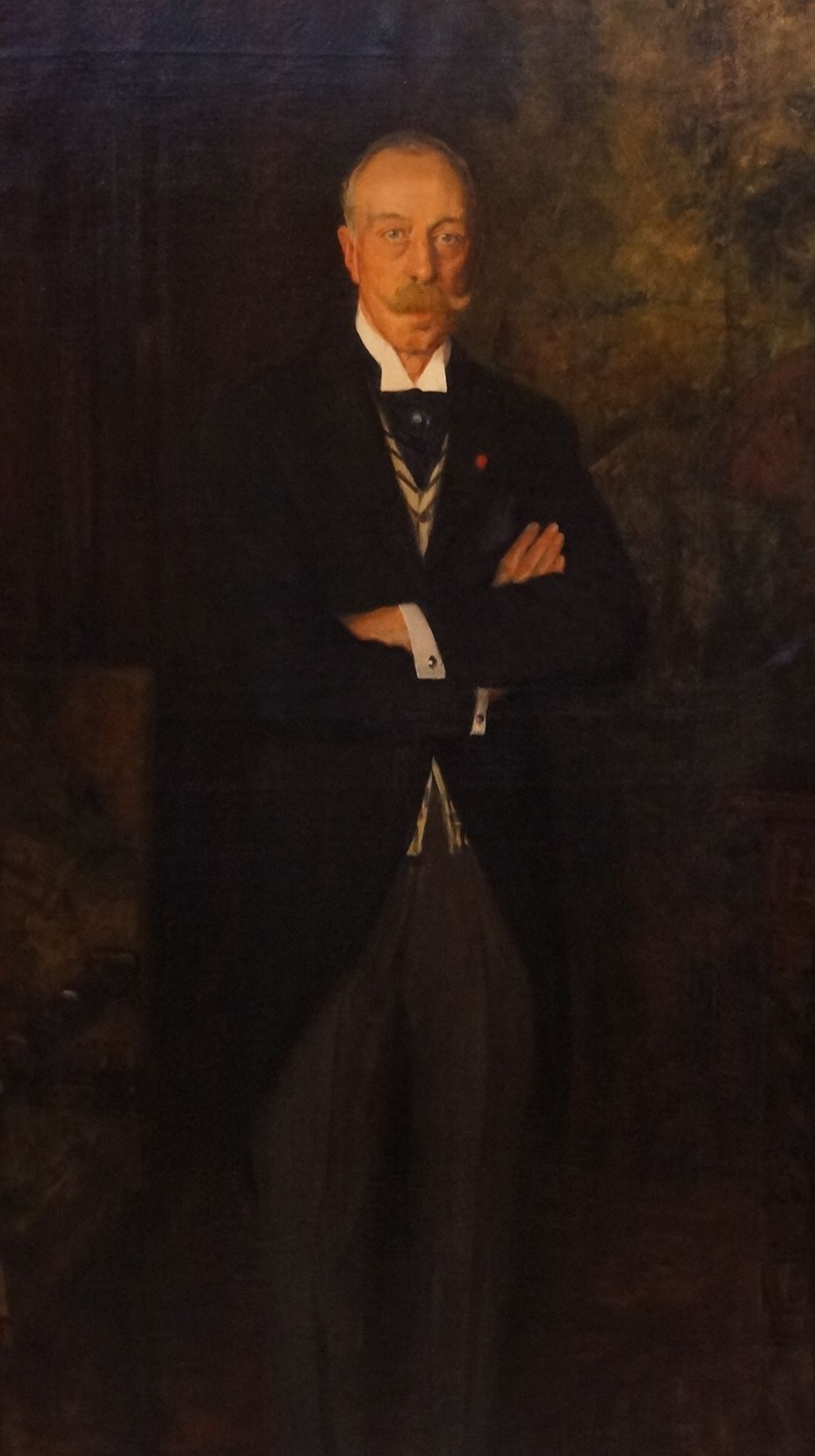
- Born: Adrien Gaston Calley Saint-Paul de Sinçay; 9 July 1854; Angleur, Belgium
- Died: 19 March 1938 (aged 83); Brussels, Belgium
- Education: Faculty of Law of Paris
- Occupation: Industrialist
- Awards: Officer of the Legion of Honour

Adrien Gaston Calley Saint-Paul de Sinçay (9 July 1854 – 19 March 1938) was a Belgian industrialist and equestrian. He was appointed an officer of the Legion of Honour.

== Personal life ==
Calley Saint-Paul de Sinçay was born in Angleur on 9 July 1854, into a family with French bourgeois roots. He studied at the Faculty of Law of Paris, graduating in 1879.

== Career ==
He joined the Société des Mines et Fonderies de Zinc de la Vieille-Montagne in 1877. He became secretary of the board of directors in 1884, and succeeded his father as managing director in 1890.

Calley Saint-Paul de Sinçay was president of the Chambre Française de Commerce et de l'Industrie de Belgique.

=== Equestrian ===
Calley Saint-Paul de Sinçay competed in the equestrian mail coach event at the 1900 Summer Olympics.

== Personal life ==
He married a Russian countess, Hélène Bloudoff; they had a daughter:

- Marie-Antoinette Louise Anne Calley Saint-Paul de Sinçay (b. 1885), who married Prince Albert de Ligne, a grandson of President of the Belgian Senate Eugène, 8th Prince of Ligne and Prince Carl of Solms-Braunfels.

Calley Saint-Paul de Sinçay died in Brussels on 19 March 1938.
