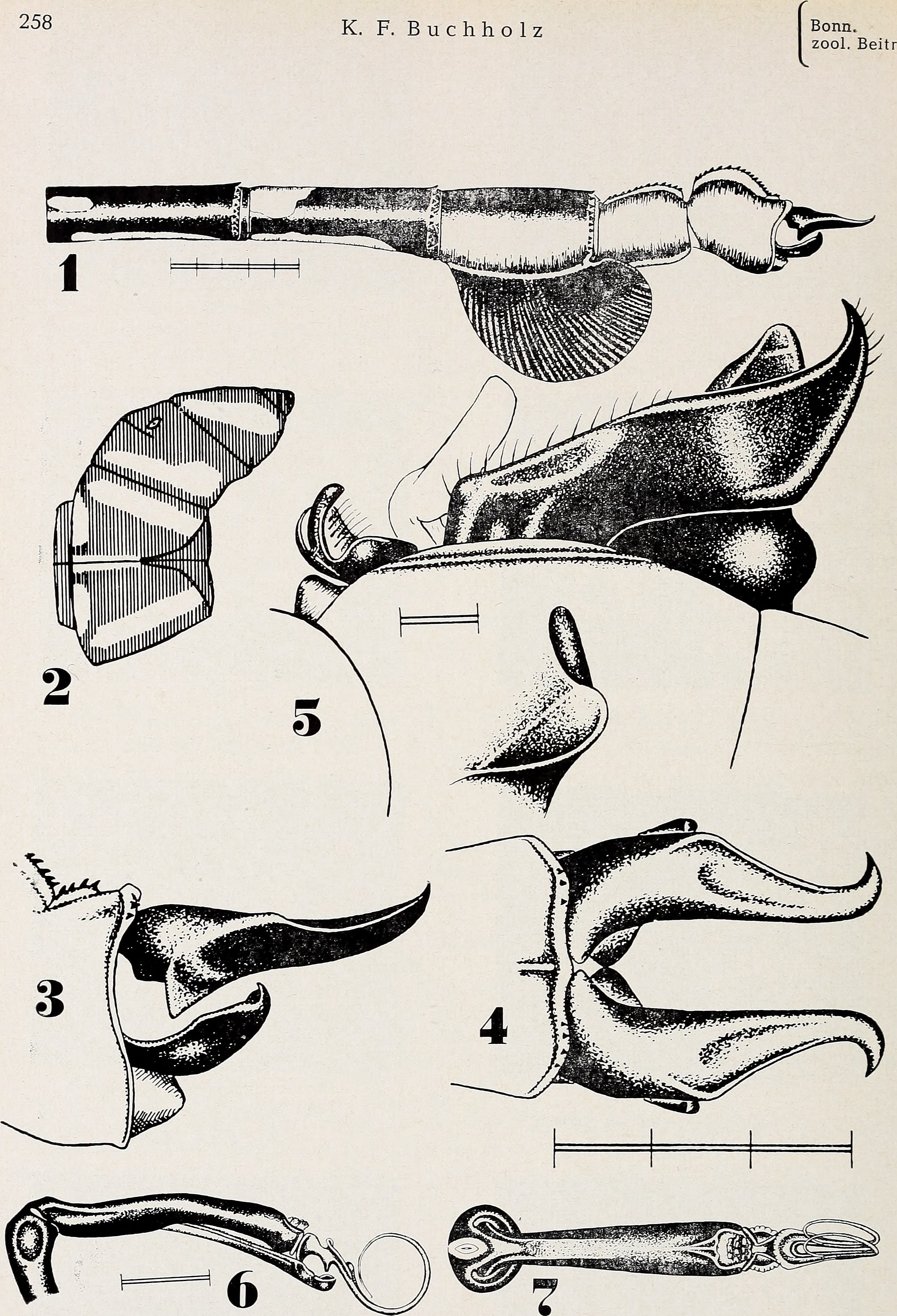

Scientific classification
- Kingdom: Animalia
- Phylum: Arthropoda
- Clade: Pancrustacea
- Class: Insecta
- Order: Odonata
- Infraorder: Anisoptera
- Family: Gomphidae
- Genus: Phyllogomphus; Selys, 1854

= Phyllogomphus =

Genus of dragonflies

Phyllogomphus is a genus of dragonflies in the family Gomphidae. It contains the following species:

- Phyllogomphus aethiops Selys, 1854
- Phyllogomphus annulus Klots, 1944
- Phyllogomphus bartolozzii Marconi, Terzani & Carletti, 2001
- Phyllogomphus coloratus Kimmins, 1931
- Phyllogomphus moundi Fraser, 1960
- Phyllogomphus occidentalis Fraser, 1957
- Phyllogomphus pseudoccidentalis Lindley, 1972
- Phyllogomphus schoutedeni Fraser, 1957
- Phyllogomphus selysi Schouteden, 1933 – southern leaftail
