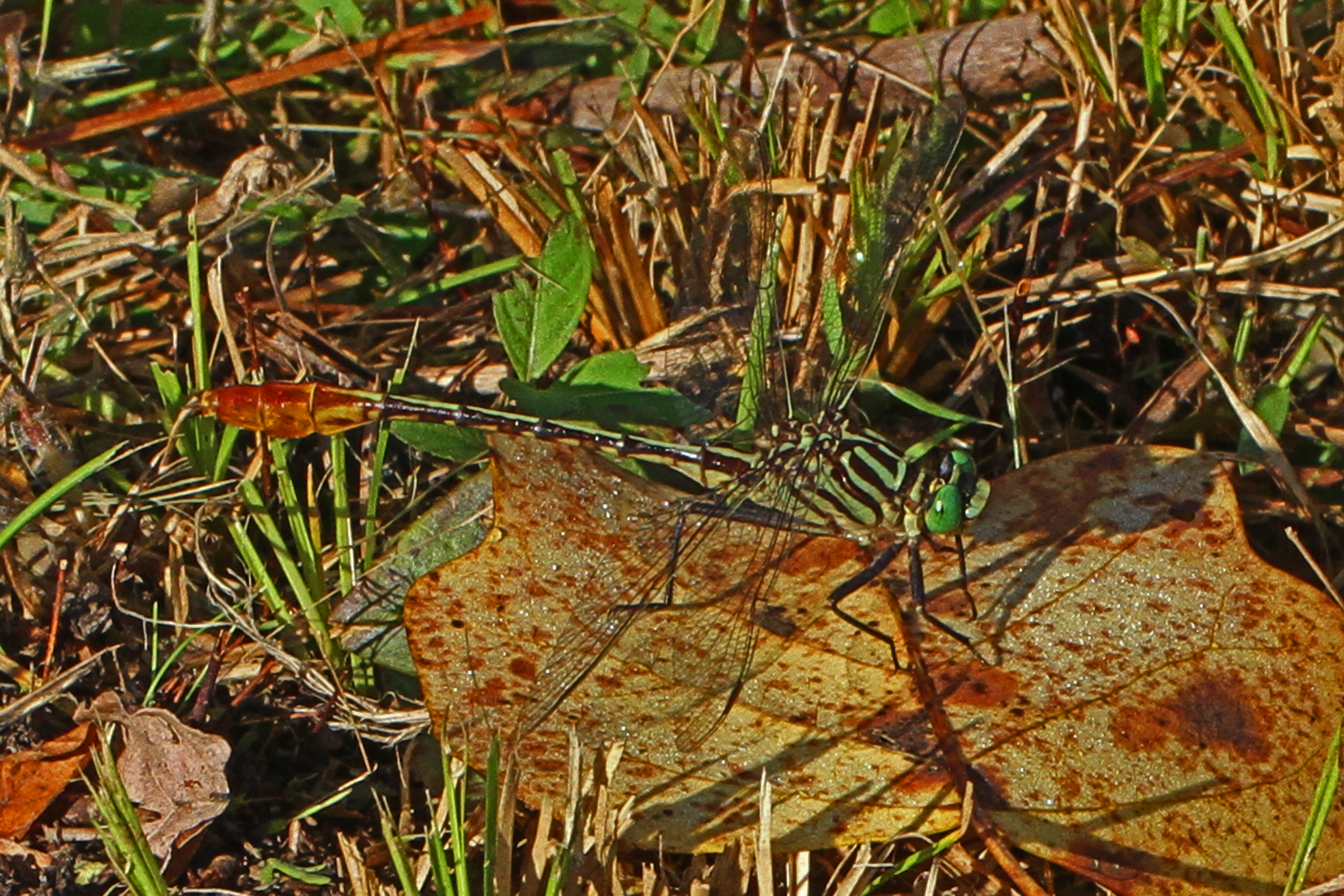

Conservation status
- Least Concern (IUCN 3.1)

Scientific classification
- Kingdom: Animalia
- Phylum: Arthropoda
- Class: Insecta
- Order: Odonata
- Infraorder: Anisoptera
- Family: Gomphidae
- Genus: Dromogomphus
- Species: D. armatus

Binomial name
- Dromogomphus armatus Selys, 1854

= Dromogomphus armatus =

Species of dragonfly

Dromogomphus armatus, the southeastern spinyleg, is a species of clubtail in the family of dragonflies known as Gomphidae. It is found in North America.

The IUCN conservation status of Dromogomphus armatus is "LC", least concern, with no immediate threat to the species' survival. The population is stable.
