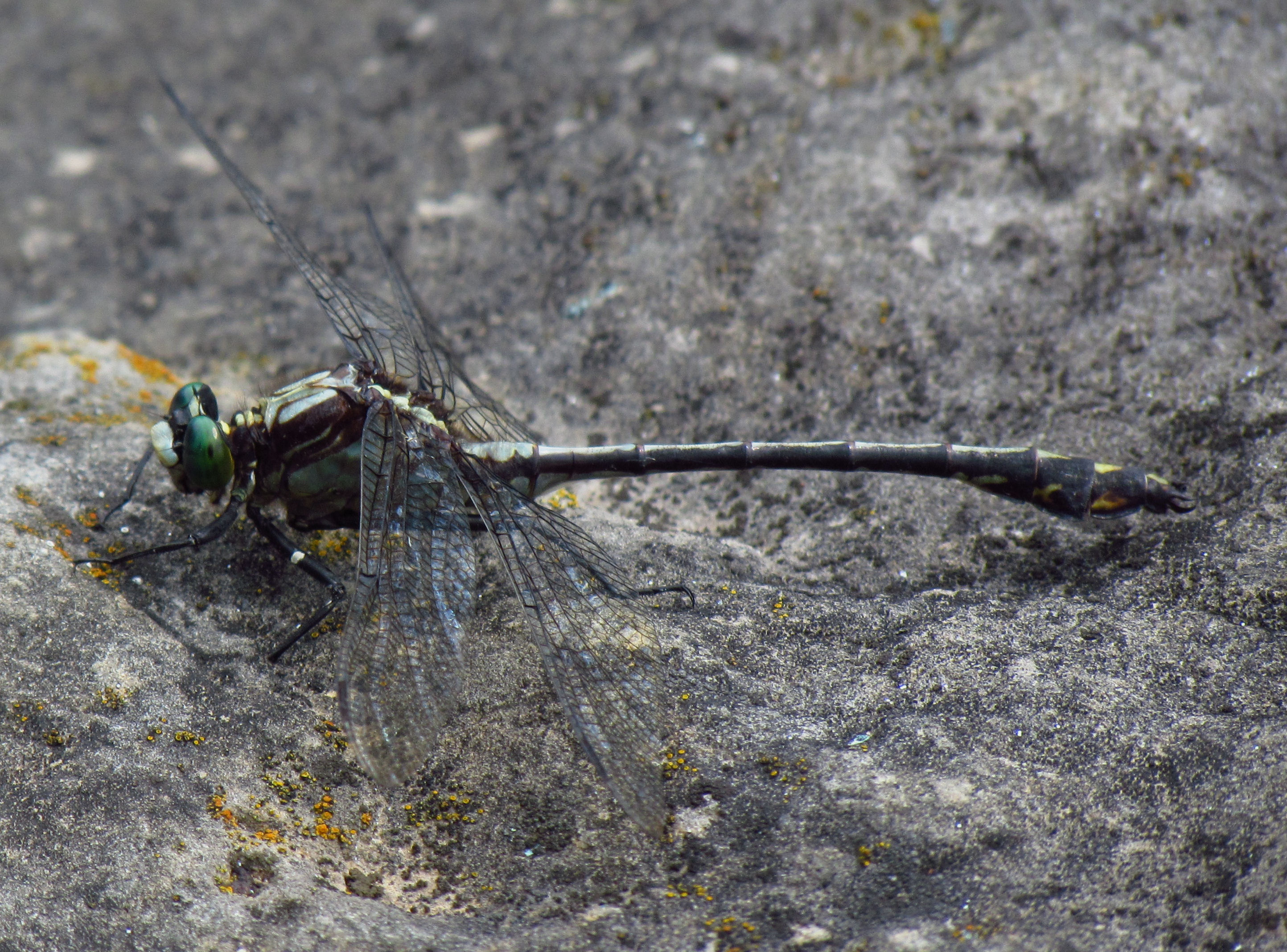
- Rideau River, Ontario

Conservation status
- Least Concern (IUCN 3.1)

Scientific classification
- Kingdom: Animalia
- Phylum: Arthropoda
- Class: Insecta
- Order: Odonata
- Infraorder: Anisoptera
- Family: Gomphidae
- Genus: Dromogomphus
- Species: D. spinosus

Binomial name
- Dromogomphus spinosus Selys, 1854

= Dromogomphus spinosus =

Species of dragonfly

Dromogomphus spinosus, the black-shouldered spinyleg, is a species of dragonflies in the family Gomphidae.

Like other spinylegs, D. spinosus have long spines on their legs that help in the capture of prey. True to their name their shoulders are black. The dorsal thorax has a light green I-shaped mark with pale ovals on either side. Their flight time is between late May and early September from southern Manitoba to the east coast of the US as far south as Florida. Terminal segments form a club with yellow lateral markings. Adults average 2.5 in (64 mm).
