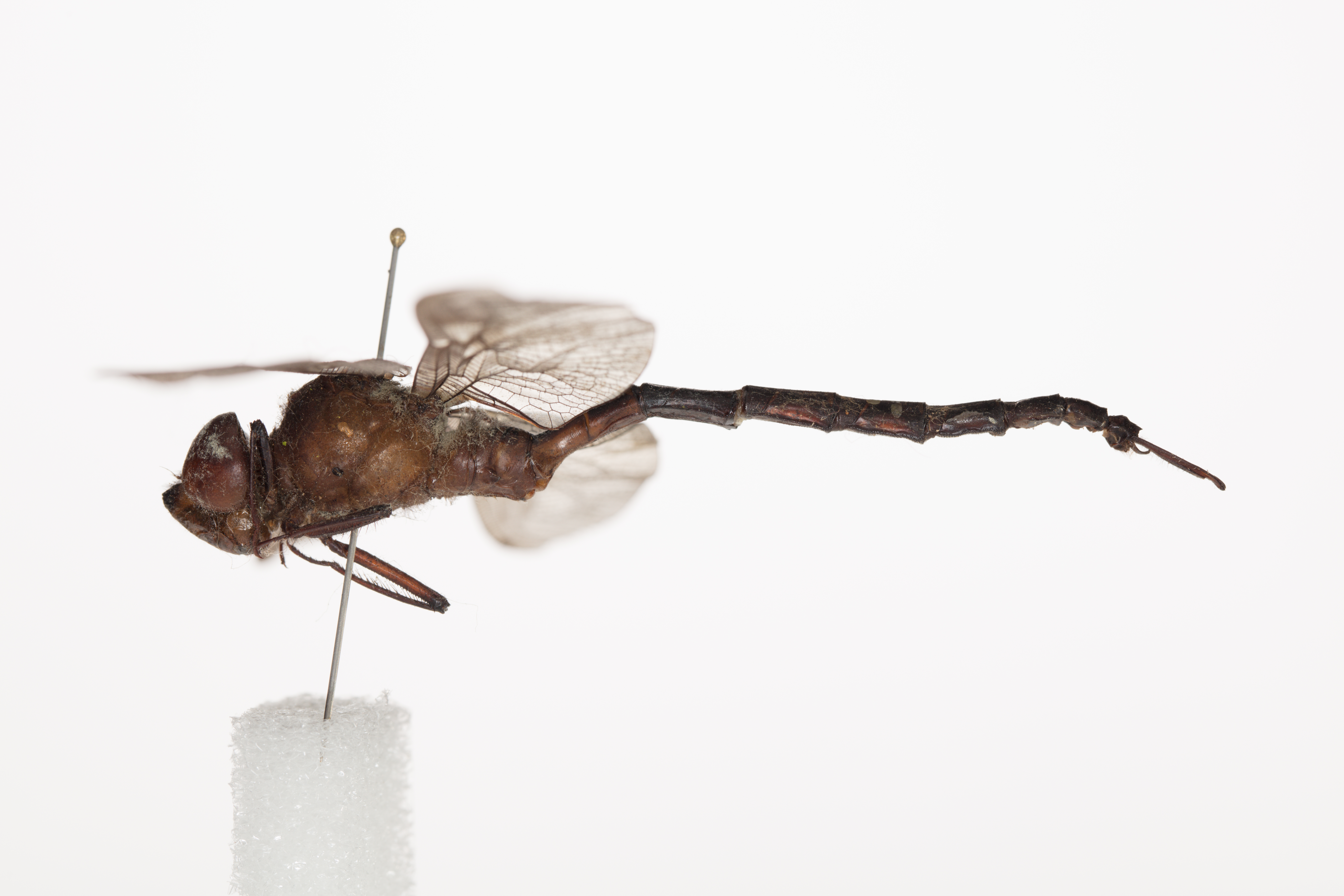
- Heliaeschna crassa

Scientific classification
- Kingdom: Animalia
- Phylum: Arthropoda
- Clade: Pancrustacea
- Class: Insecta
- Order: Odonata
- Infraorder: Anisoptera
- Family: Aeshnidae
- Subfamily: Aeshninae
- Genus: Heliaeschna; Sélys, 1882

= Heliaeschna =

Genus of dragonflies

Heliaeschna is a genus of dragonflies in the family Aeshnidae.

The genus contains the following eleven described species:

- Heliaeschna bartelsi Lieftinck, 1940
- Heliaeschna crassa Krüger, 1899
- Heliaeschna cynthiae Fraser, 1939 - Blade-tipped duskhawker
- Heliaeschna filostyla Martin, 1906
- Heliaeschna fuliginosa Karsch, 1893 - Black-banded duskhawker
- Heliaeschna idae (Brauer, 1865)
- Heliaeschna sembe Pinhey, 1962 - Hybrid duskhawker
- Heliaeschna simplicia (Karsch, 1891)
- Heliaeschna trinervulata Fraser, 1955 - Pale duskhawker
- Heliaeschna ugandica McLachlan, 1896 - Uganda duskhawker
- Heliaeschna uninervula Martin, 1909
