= Zephyrogomphus lateralis =

Lilac hunter

Conservation status
- Least Concern (IUCN 3.1)

Scientific classification
- Kingdom: Animalia
- Phylum: Arthropoda
- Clade: Pancrustacea
- Class: Insecta
- Order: Odonata
- Suborder: Anisoptera
- Family: Gomphidae
- Genus: Zephyrogomphus
- Species: Z. lateralis

Binomial name
- Zephyrogomphus lateralis (Selys, 1873)

Synonyms
- Hemigomphus lateralis Selys, 1873; Austrogomphus occidentalis Tillyard, 1908

Species of dragonfly

Zephyrogomphus lateralis is a species of dragonfly in the family Gomphidae, known as the lilac hunter. It inhabits streams and rivers in south-western Australia.

Zephyrogomphus lateralis is a medium-sized, dark brown dragonfly with brown and cream markings, and a lilac colouring on the side of its body.

== Etymology ==
The genus name Zephyrogomphus is derived from the Greek ζέφυρος (zephyros, "west wind"), combined with Gomphus, a genus name derived from the Greek γόμφος (gomphos, "peg" or "nail"). The name refers to the genus being found originally only in south-western Australia.

The species name lateralis is derived from the Latin lateralis ("of the side" or "lateral"), possibly referring to the spots or bands on either side of the thorax.

== Gallery ==
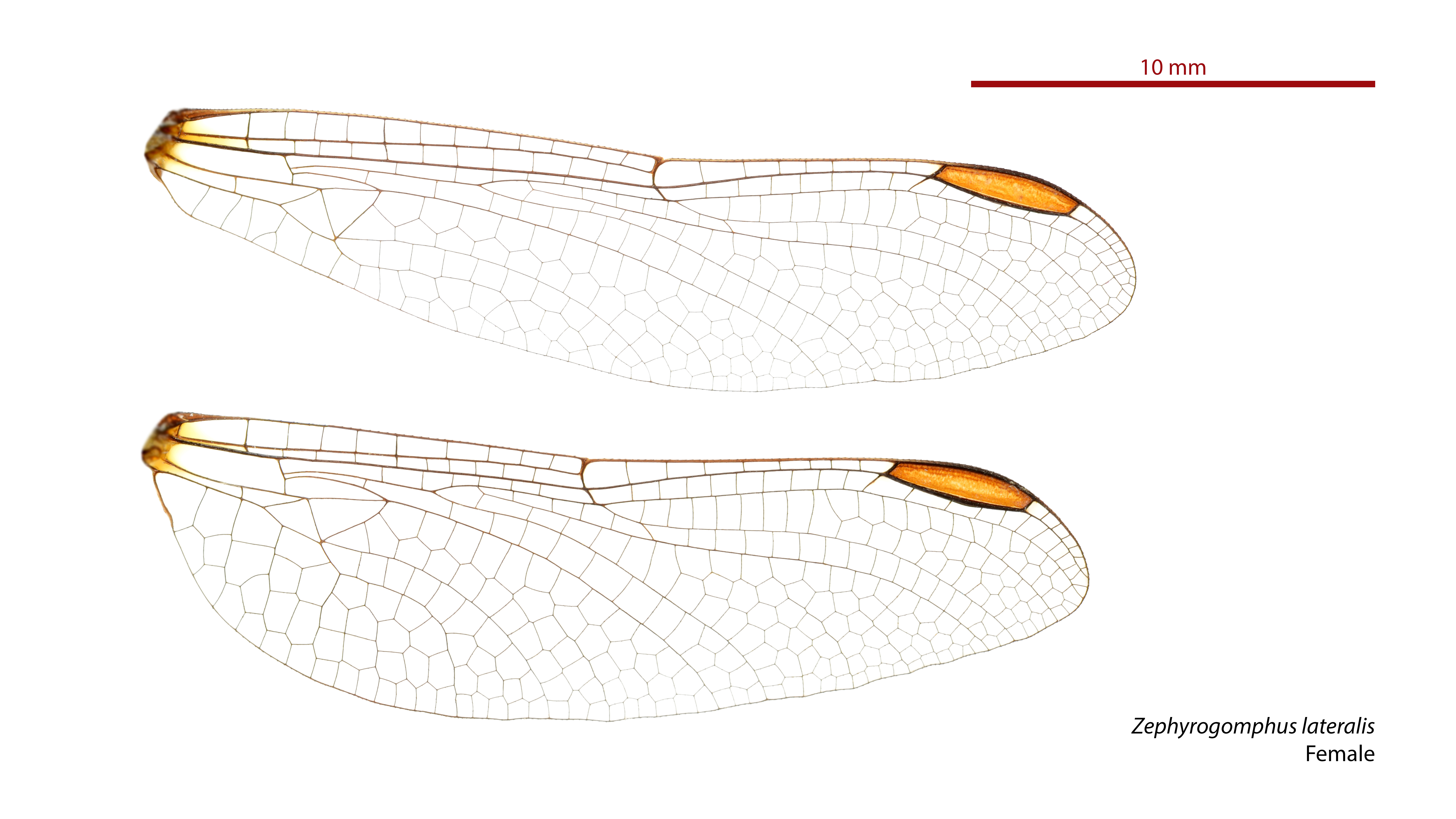
Female wings

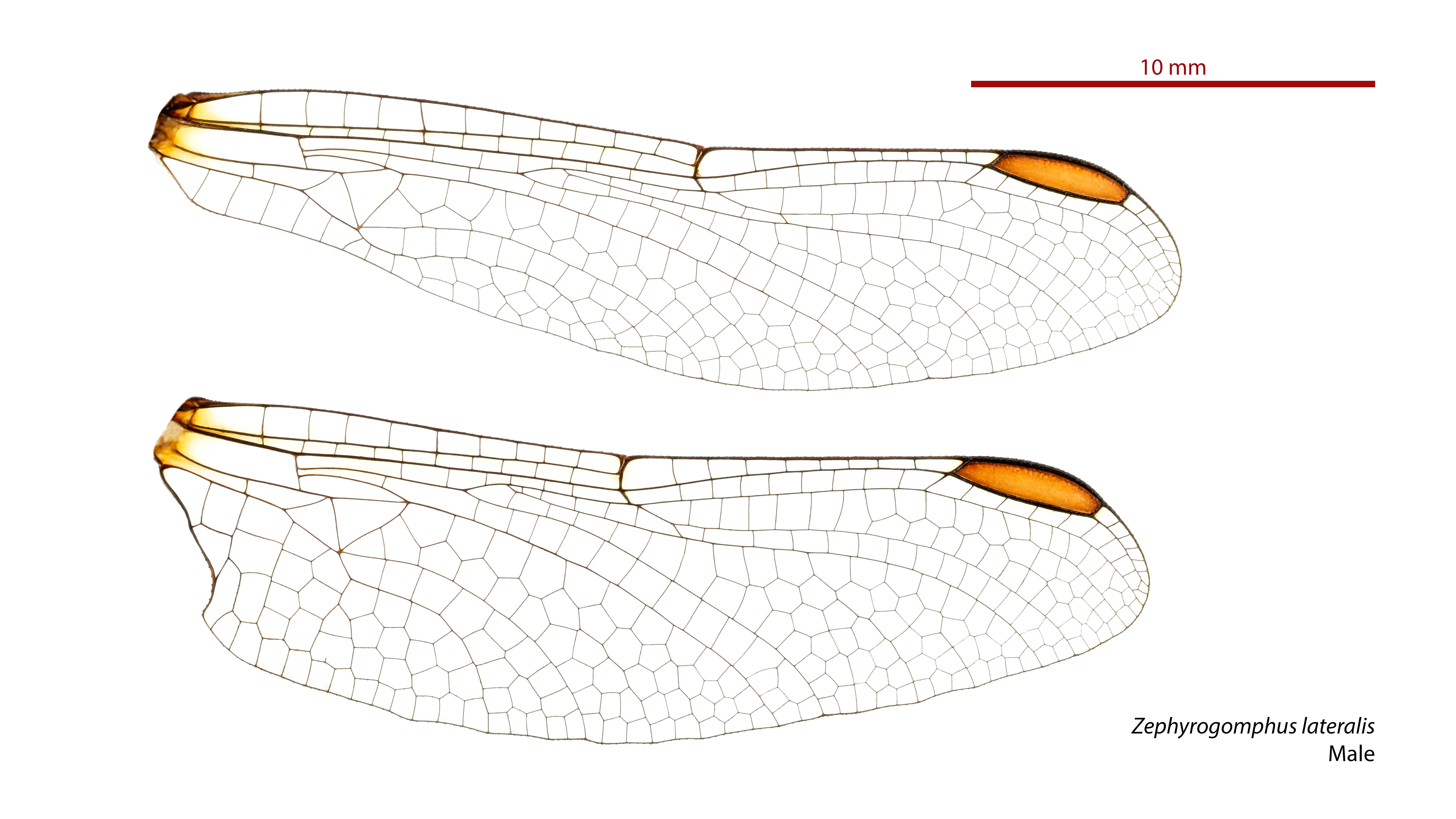
Male wings

== See also ==
- List of Odonata species of Australia
