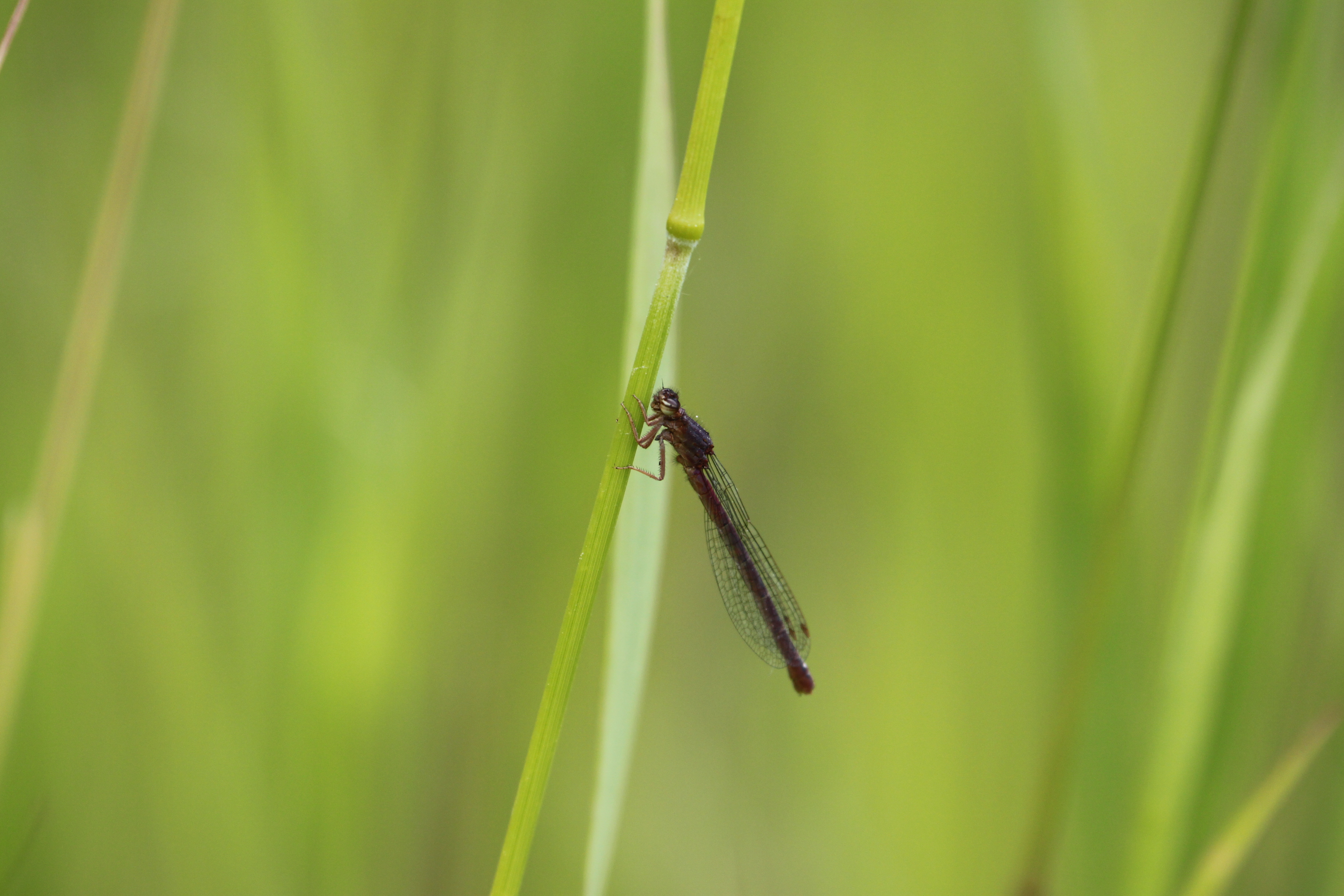

Conservation status
- Least Concern (IUCN 3.1)

Scientific classification
- Kingdom: Animalia
- Phylum: Arthropoda
- Clade: Pancrustacea
- Class: Insecta
- Order: Odonata
- Suborder: Zygoptera
- Family: Coenagrionidae
- Genus: Amphiagrion
- Species: A. abbreviatum

Binomial name
- Amphiagrion abbreviatum (Selys, 1876)

= Amphiagrion abbreviatum =

Western red damsel

Species of damselfly

Amphiagrion abbreviatum, the western red damsel, is a species of narrow-winged damselfly in the family Coenagrionidae. It is found in Central America and North America.

The IUCN conservation status of Amphiagrion abbreviatum is "LC", least concern, with no immediate threat to the species' survival. The population is stable. The IUCN status was reviewed in 2017.

== Distribution and habitat ==
The western red damsel is primarily distributed across western North America, with records spanning four Canadian provinces, 23 U.S. states, and one state in Mexico. Its range extends from British Columbia and the northern prairies to the southwestern United States and Baja California.

Amphiagrion abbreviatum has long been considered a lentic species, typically found in marshes fed by springs and seepage areas in arid regions, as well as along the vegetated edges of ponds, lakes, and slow-moving streams. These calm, stable waters provide the perfect setting for larval development among submerged vegetation and allow adults to perch and oviposit without risk of being swept away. However, recent fieldwork in southern Alberta has revealed something unexpected: thriving, reproducing populations of A. abbreviatum in flowing riverine systems, including the North Milk River and Pincher Creek. At these sites, the damselflies were seen perching, mating, and ovipositing on gravel bars, emergent vegetation, and riparian grasses, all under slow but persistent current. This reproductive activity in lotic environments suggests that A. abbreviatum is behaviorally and perhaps morphologically equipped to use them. Unlike most damselflies, which specialize in either lentic or lotic systems, A. abbreviatum occupies both. This unexpected versatility challenges our assumptions about ecological specialization and highlights the species as a rare case of habitat plasticity in Odonata.

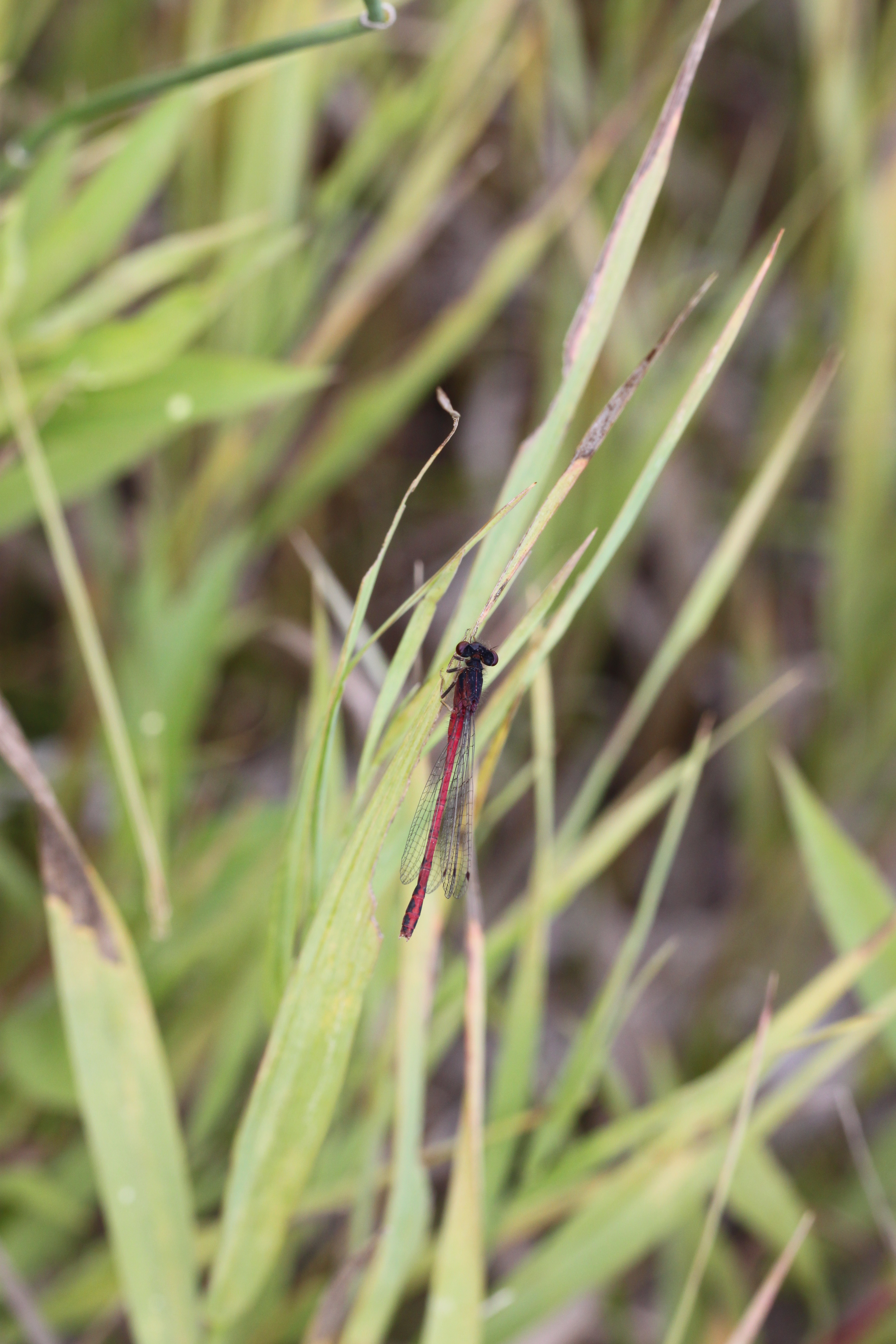
Western red damsel, Amphiagrion abbreviatum
