= Albert de Ligne =

Belgian diplomat

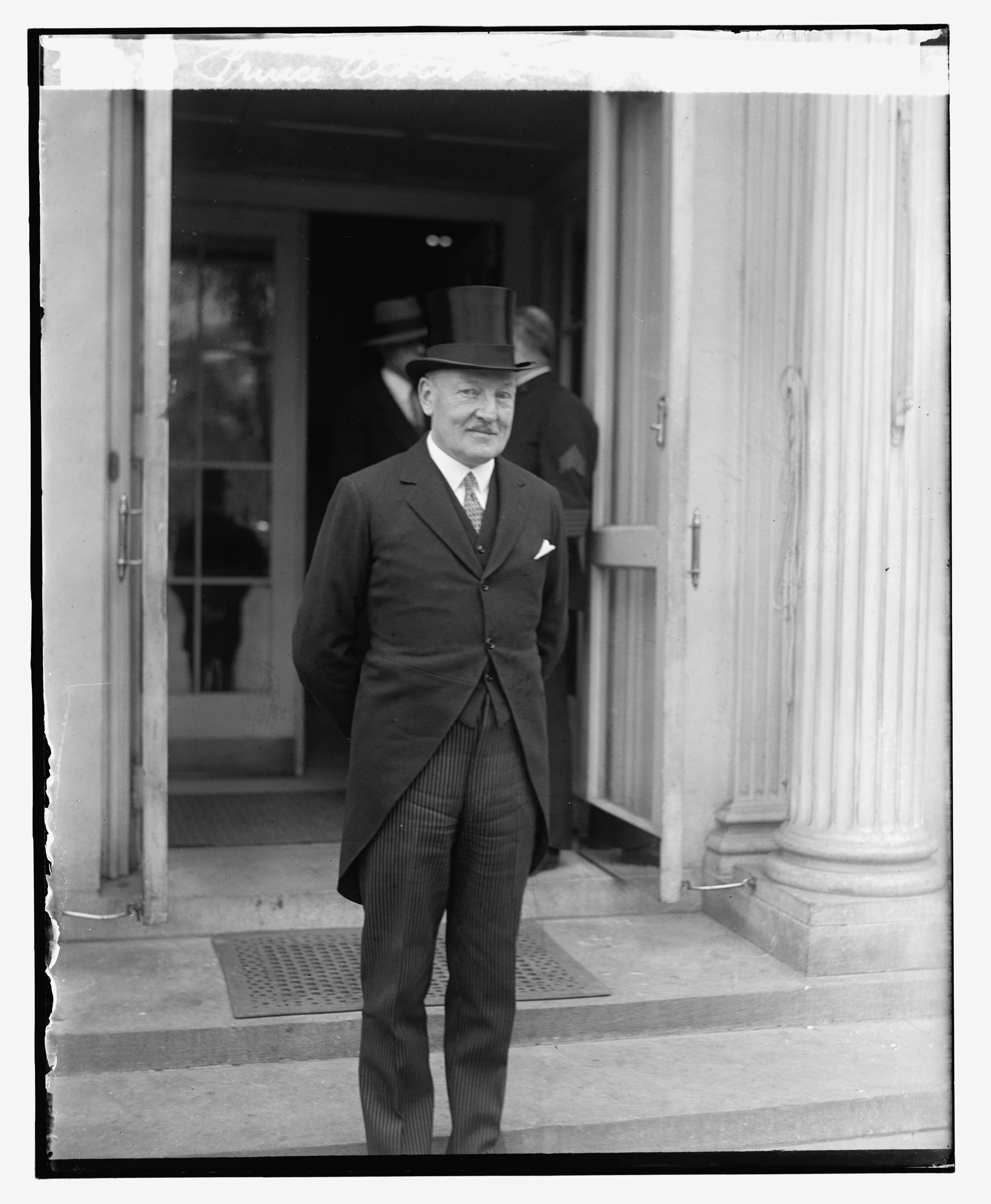
- Prince Albert de Ligne, 1929

Belgian Ambassador to the United States
- In office 1927–1931
- President: Calvin Coolidge (1927–1929); Herbert Hoover (1929–1931)
- Preceded by: Emile de Cartier de Marchienne
- Succeeded by: Paul May

Personal details
- Born: Albert-Edouard-Eugène Lamoral de Ligne; 12 December 1874 Brussels, Belgium
- Died: 4 July 1957 (aged 82) Brussels, Belgium
- Spouse: Marie Louise Saint-Paul de Sinçay
- Children: Elisabeth de Ligne
- Parent(s): Edouard de Ligne; Eulalie of Solms-Braunfels

Prince Albert-Edouard-Eugène Lamoral de Ligne (12 December 1874 – 4 July 1957) was a Belgian diplomat.

== Early life ==
Prince Albert was born in Brussels on 12 December 1874 into the princely Ligne family. He was the eldest son of Prince Edouard Henri Auguste Lamoral de Ligne (1839–1911) and Princess Eulalie Marie Sophia Dorothea of Solms-Braunfels (1851–1922). His had been married to Augusta Theodosia Mary Cunyngham (a daughter of Sir David Cunynghame, 6th Baronet), who died in 1872.

His paternal grandparents were the President of the Belgian Senate Eugène, 8th Prince of Ligne and, his third wife, Jadwiga Lubomirska. Through his aunt, Princess Natalie, he was a first cousin of Princess Isabella of Croÿ. His maternal grandparents were the adventurer Prince Carl of Solms-Braunfels (Note: Prince Albert's grandfather, Prince Carl of Solms-Braunfels, was the son of Maj.-Gen. Prince Frederick William of Solms-Braunfels (1770–1814) and Princess Frederica of Mecklenburg-Strelitz (1778–1841). Princess Frederica, a daughter of Grand Duke Charles II of Mecklenburg-Strelitz, was the widow of Prince Louis Charles of Prussia (second son of King Frederick William II of Prussia). After his great-grandfather's death in 1814, his great-grandmother married King Ernest Augustus of Hanover (himself the fifth son of George III of the United Kingdom) in 1815. From her third marriage, she was the mother of King George V of Hanover (the half-brother of Prince Albert's grandfather).) and, his second wife, Princess Sophie of Löwenstein-Wertheim-Rosenberg (widow of Prince Franz of Salm-Salm).

== Career ==
Prince Albert presented his credentials to president on 26 October 1927. He served until 1931 when he was succeeded in Washington, D.C. by Paul May (who died in office on 30 July 1934).

== Personal life ==
Prince de Ligne was married to Marie Louise Anne Calley Saint-Paul de Sinçay (b. 1885), a daughter of Belgian industrialist Gaston Saint-Paul de Sinçay and his wife, Russian Countess Hélène Bloudoff. Together, they were the parents of:

- Princess Elisabeth Marie Eulalie Hélène de Ligne (1908–1998), who married Count Guillaume de Limburg Stirum, a son of Count Henri de Limburg Stirum, in 1932.

Prince Albert died on 4 July 1957 in Brussels.
