= Paul Dognin =

French entomologist (1847–1931)

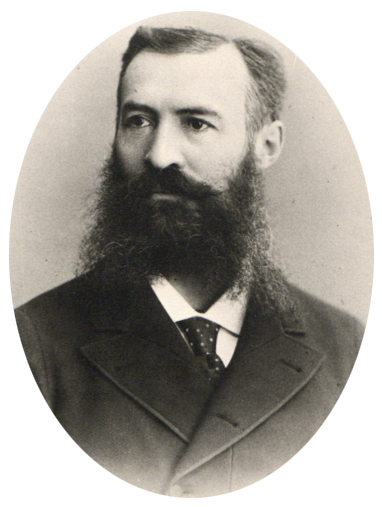
- Born: 10 May 1847
- Died: 10 August 1931 (aged 84)
- Known for: study of Lepidoptera of South America
- Notable work: Hétérocères nouveaux de l'Amérique du Sud
- Scientific career
- Fields: entomology

Paul Dognin (10 May 1847 – 10 August 1931) was a French entomologist who specialised in the Lepidoptera of South America. Dognin named 101 new genera of moths.

He was a member of the Royal Belgian Entomological Society and life member of the Société entomologique de France.

Part of his collection was purchased by James John Joicey in 1921. The 82,000 other specimens (including 3,000 Dognin types and over 300 Thierry-Mieg types) were sold in 1926 to William Schaus, who then donated it to National Museum of Natural History in Washington, DC.

== Publications ==
Printed by Charles Oberthür

- Catalogue des Geometridae de l'Amerique Centrale et du Sud.
- Hétérocères nouveaux de l'Amérique du Sud. Fascicule 1. (1910)
- Hétérocères nouveaux de l'Amérique du Sud. Fascicule 3. (1911)
- Hétérocères nouveaux de l'Amérique du Sud. Fascicule 5. (1912)
- Hétérocères nouveaux de l'Amérique du Sud. Fascicule 6. (1912)
- Hétérocères nouveaux de l'Amérique du Sud. Fascicule 7. (1914)
- Hétérocères nouveaux de l'Amérique du Sud. Fascicule 8. (1914)
- Hétérocères nouveaux de l'Amérique du Sud. Fascicule 9. (1916)
- Note sur la faune des Lépidoptères de Loja et environs (Équateur). Description d'espèces nouvelles. (1887–1894). 3 parts 10 plates.
