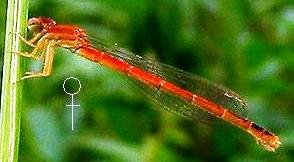

Scientific classification
- Kingdom: Animalia
- Phylum: Arthropoda
- Class: Insecta
- Order: Odonata
- Suborder: Zygoptera
- Family: Coenagrionidae
- Genus: Amphiagrion; Selys, 1876

= Amphiagrion =

Genus of damselflies

Amphiagrion is a genus of damselflies in the family Coenagrionidae. The males are bright red with some black; the females are duller. The genus is confined to North America.

The genus contains the following species:

- Amphiagrion abbreviatum (Selys, 1876) - western red damsel
- Amphiagrion saucium (Burmeister, 1839) - eastern red damsel
