= Parliamentary Consultation Committee =

Belgian governmental body

The Parliamentary Consultation Committee (Dutch: Parlementaire overlegcommissie; French: Commission parlementaire de concertation) is a joint committee of the Federal Parliament of Belgium. It is established by Article 82 of the Belgian Constitution and its main task is to resolve certain disputes with regard to legislative procedure and the time limits within which the Senate can evoke and examine certain bills. It functions in accordance with the law of 6 April 1995.

The Parliamentary Consultation Committee consists of 11 members of the Chamber of Representatives, including the President of the Chamber of Representatives and 11 members of the Senate, including the President of the Senate. The members of the committee are appointed by their respective chamber for a term of 4 years, unless the Chambers are dissolved early, in accordance with the principle of proportional representation. It is chaired alternately by the President of the Chamber of Representatives and the President of the Senate for the duration of a parliamentary year, which lasts in principle from October to October the following year.
