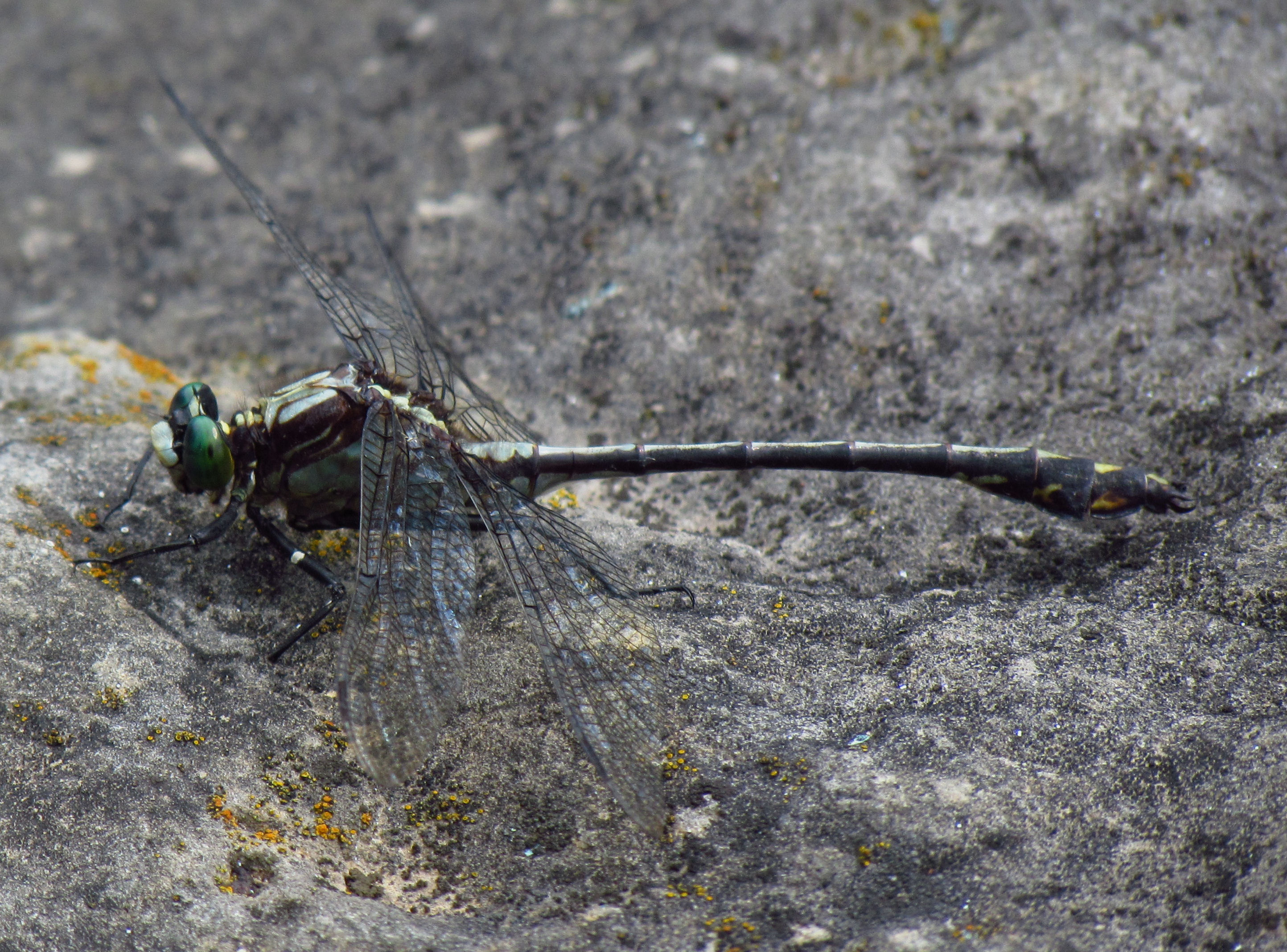
- Dromogomphus spinosus

Scientific classification
- Kingdom: Animalia
- Phylum: Arthropoda
- Class: Insecta
- Order: Odonata
- Infraorder: Anisoptera
- Family: Gomphidae
- Genus: Dromogomphus; Selys, 1854

= Dromogomphus =

Genus of dragonflies

Dromogomphus is a genus of dragonflies in the family Gomphidae. They are commonly known as spinylegs from the spines on their legs that help in the capture of prey.

== Species ==
Listed alphabetically.

- Dromogomphus armatus Selys, 1854 – southeastern spinyleg
- Dromogomphus spinosus Selys, 1854 – black-shouldered spinyleg
- Dromogomphus spoliatus (Hagen in Selys, 1858) – flag-tailed spinyleg
