= Zephyrogomphus =

Scientific classification
- Kingdom: Animalia
- Phylum: Arthropoda
- Clade: Pancrustacea
- Class: Insecta
- Order: Odonata
- Suborder: Anisoptera
- Family: Gomphidae
- Genus: Zephyrogomphus; Watson, 1991

Genus of dragonflies

Zephyrogomphus is a genus of dragonflies in the family Gomphidae. The species are medium-sized and dark brown with dull markings. They are commonly known as hunters. The two species of Zephyrogomphus are found on opposite sides of the Australian continent - in south-western Australia and north-eastern Queensland.

== Species ==
The genus Zephyrogomphus includes two species:

- Zephyrogomphus lateralis (Selys, 1873) - lilac hunter
- Zephyrogomphus longipositor (Watson, 1991) - rainforest hunter

== Etymology ==
The genus name Zephyrogomphus is derived from the Greek ζέφυρος (zephyros, "west wind"), combined with Gomphus, a genus name derived from the Greek γόμφος (gomphos, "peg" or "nail"). The name refers to the genus being found originally only in south-western Australia.

== See also ==
- List of Odonata species of Australia
