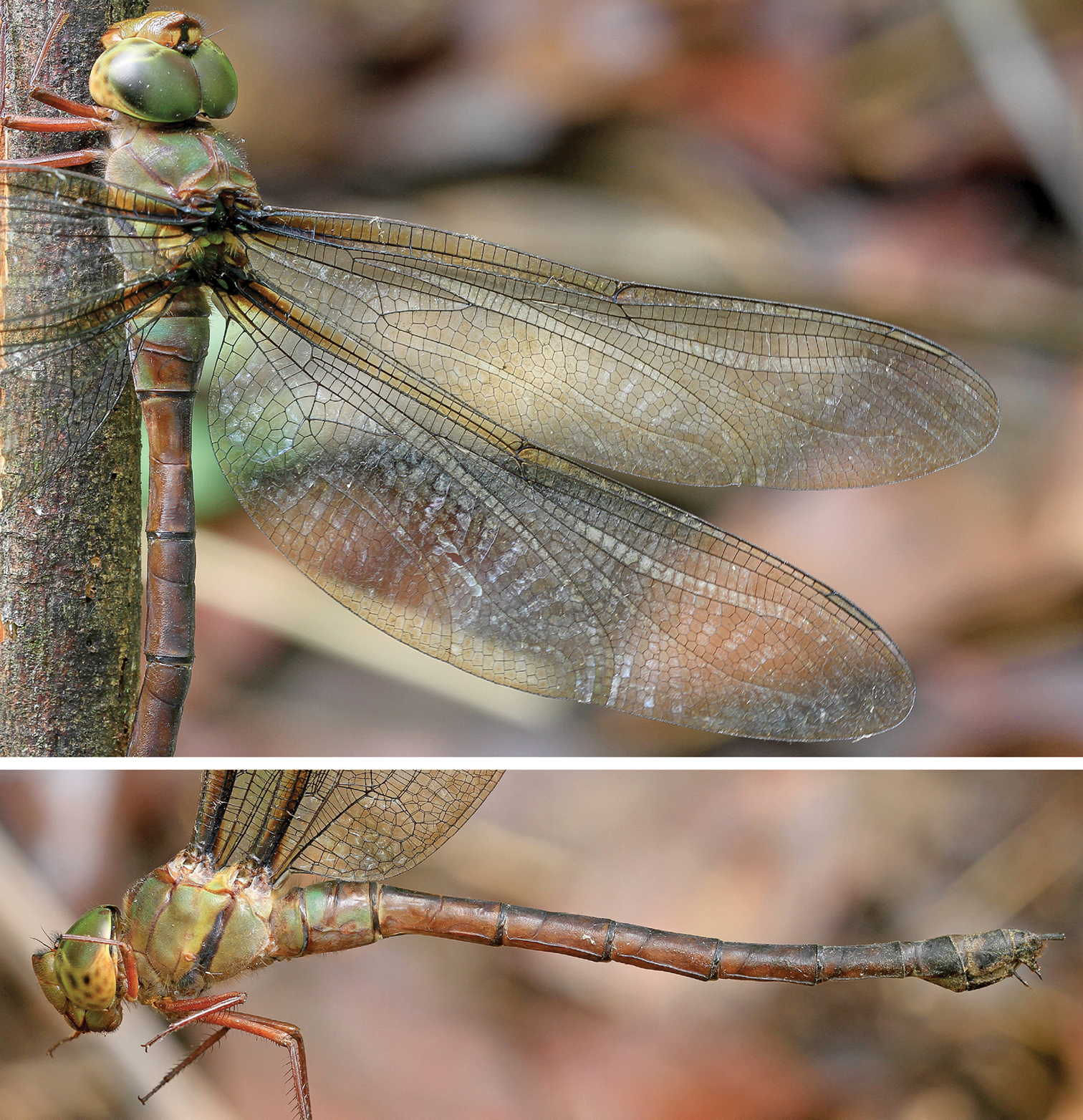

Conservation status
- Least Concern (IUCN 3.1)

Scientific classification
- Kingdom: Animalia
- Phylum: Arthropoda
- Class: Insecta
- Order: Odonata
- Infraorder: Anisoptera
- Family: Aeshnidae
- Genus: Heliaeschna
- Species: H. fuliginosa

Binomial name
- Heliaeschna fuliginosa Karsch, 1893

= Heliaeschna fuliginosa =

Black-banded duskhawker

Species of dragonfly

Heliaeschna fuliginosa (black-banded duskhawker) is a species of dragonfly in the family Aeshnidae. It is found in Central and Western Africa (Angola, Cameroon, Central African Republic, the Democratic Republic of the Congo, Ivory Coast, Equatorial Guinea, Gabon, Gambia, Ghana, Guinea, Liberia, Nigeria, Sierra Leone, and Uganda). Its natural habitat is subtropical or tropical moist lowland forests.
