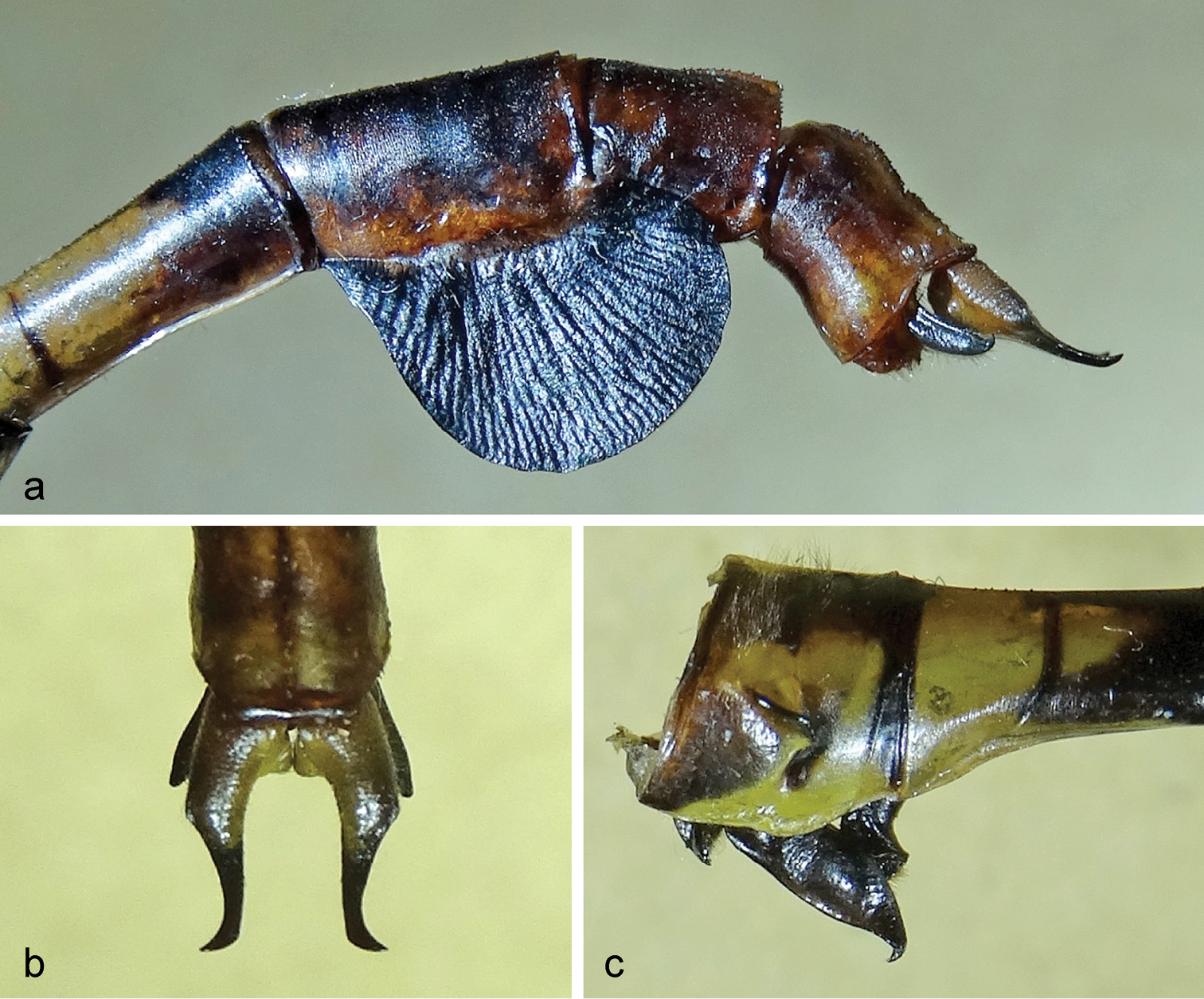

Conservation status
- Least Concern (IUCN 3.1)

Scientific classification
- Kingdom: Animalia
- Phylum: Arthropoda
- Class: Insecta
- Order: Odonata
- Infraorder: Anisoptera
- Family: Gomphidae
- Genus: Phyllogomphus
- Species: P. selysi

Binomial name
- Phyllogomphus selysi Schouteden, 1933

= Phyllogomphus selysi =

Species of dragonfly

Phyllogomphus selysi is a species of dragonfly in the family Gomphidae. It is found in Angola, Botswana, Cameroon, the Republic of the Congo, the Democratic Republic of the Congo, Kenya, Malawi, Mozambique, Namibia, South Africa, Tanzania, Uganda, Zambia, Zimbabwe, and possibly Burundi. Its natural habitat is rivers.
