= Camille de Tornaco =

Belgian landowner and liberal politician

President of the Senate
- In office 11 November 1879 – 3 August 1880
- Preceded by: Eugène de Ligne d'Amblise et d'Epinoy
- Succeeded by: Edmond de Sélys Longchamps

Personal details
- Born: 6 April 1807; Steinfort, France (now Luxembourg)
- Died: 8 March 1880 (aged 72); Brussels, Belgium
- Political party: Liberal Party

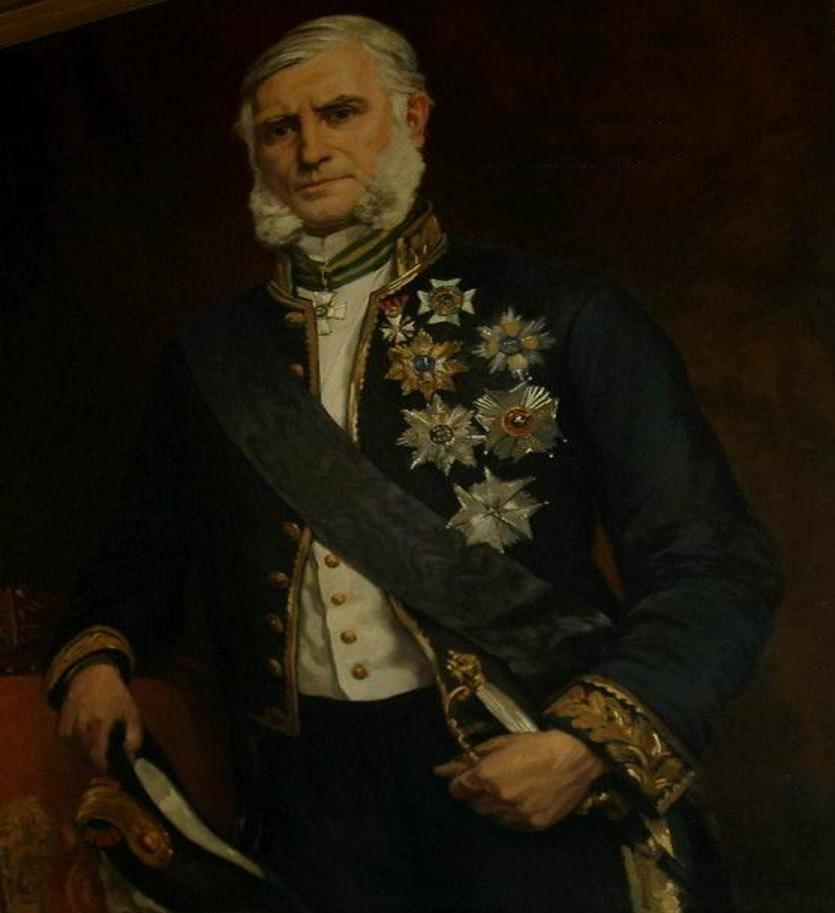

Baron Marie Camille Louis de Gonzague Ghislain (Camille) de Tornaco (6 April 1807 – 8 March 1880) was a Belgian landowner and liberal politician.

He was born in Steinfort, Luxembourg. He was a member of the provincial council of Liège, a member of the Belgian parliament and President of the Belgian Senate from 11 November 1879 until 8 March 1880. He died in Brussels.

== See also ==
- Liberal Party
- Liberalism in Belgium

== Sources ==
- Camille de Tornaco
- Mémorial de la Province de Liège 1836–1986, Liège, p. 187.
- De Paepe, Jean-Luc, Raindorf-Gérard, Christiane (ed.), Le Parlement Belge 1831–1894. Données Biographiques, Brussels, Académie Royale de Belgique, 1996, p. 246.
- Douxchamps, José, Présence nobiliaire au parlement belge (1830–1970). Notes généalogiques, Wépion-Namen, José Douxchamps, 2003, p. 131.

Political offices
Preceded by Eugène de Ligne d'Amblise et d'Epinoy	President of the Senate; 1879–1880	Succeeded by Edmond de Sélys Longchamps
