= Heliaeschna cynthiae =

Conservation status
- Least Concern (IUCN 3.1)

Scientific classification
- Kingdom: Animalia
- Phylum: Arthropoda
- Class: Insecta
- Order: Odonata
- Infraorder: Anisoptera
- Family: Aeshnidae
- Genus: Heliaeschna
- Species: H. cynthiae

Binomial name
- Heliaeschna cynthiae Fraser, 1939

Species of dragonfly

Heliaeschna cynthiae is a species of dragonfly in the family Aeshnidae. It is found in Cameroon, Uganda, and Zambia. Its natural habitat is subtropical or tropical moist lowland forests.
