= Zephyrogomphus longipositor =

Rainforest hunter

Conservation status
- Near Threatened (IUCN 3.1)

Scientific classification
- Kingdom: Animalia
- Phylum: Arthropoda
- Clade: Pancrustacea
- Class: Insecta
- Order: Odonata
- Suborder: Anisoptera
- Family: Gomphidae
- Genus: Zephyrogomphus
- Species: Z. longipositor

Binomial name
- Zephyrogomphus longipositor (Watson, 1991)

Synonyms
- Odontogomphus longipositor Watson, 1991

Species of dragonfly

Zephyrogomphus longipositor is a species of dragonfly in the family Gomphidae, known as the rainforest hunter. It inhabits rainforest streams and pools in northeast Queensland, Australia.

Zephyrogomphus longipositor is a medium-sized, dark brown dragonfly with brown and greenish yellow markings.

== Etymology ==
The genus name Zephyrogomphus is derived from the Greek ζέφυρος (zephyros, "west wind"), combined with Gomphus, a genus name derived from the Greek γόμφος (gomphos, "peg" or "nail"). The name refers to the genus being found originally only in south-western Australia.

The species name longipositor refers to the extraordinarily long ovipositor of the female.

== Gallery ==
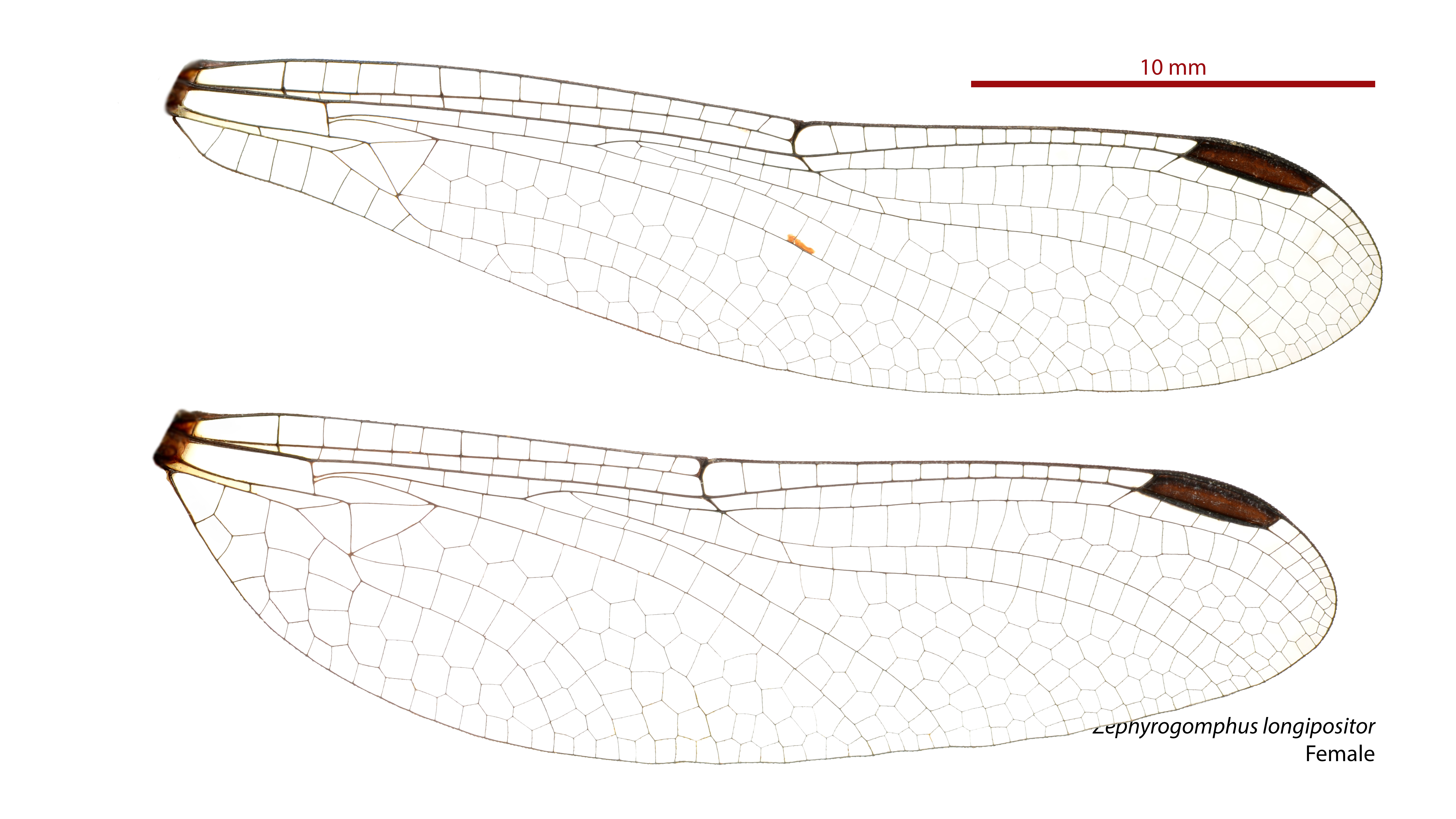
Female wings

== See also ==
- List of Odonata species of Australia
