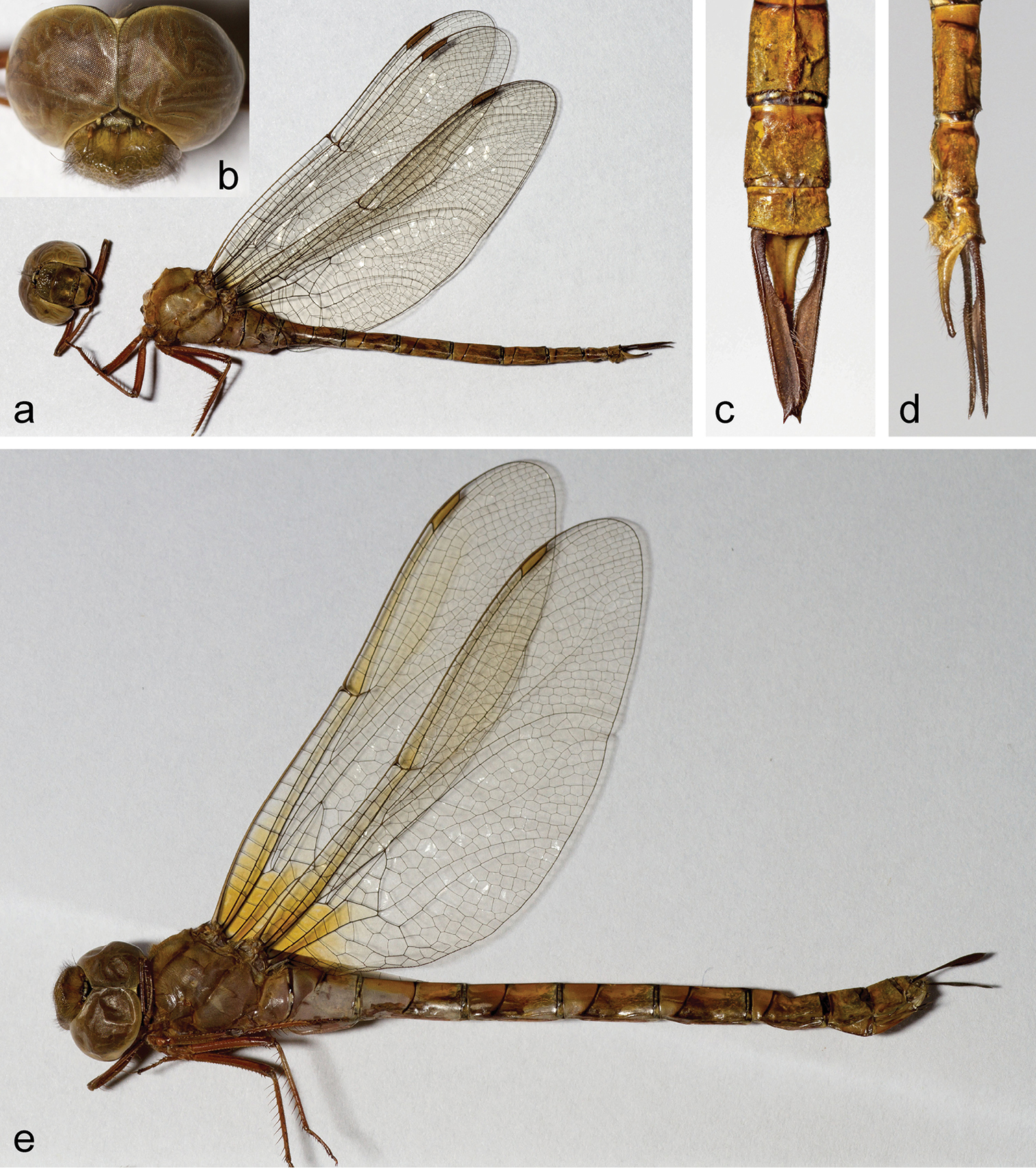

Conservation status
- Least Concern (IUCN 3.1)

Scientific classification
- Kingdom: Animalia
- Phylum: Arthropoda
- Class: Insecta
- Order: Odonata
- Infraorder: Anisoptera
- Family: Aeshnidae
- Genus: Heliaeschna
- Species: H. trinervulata

Binomial name
- Heliaeschna trinervulata Fraser, 1955

= Heliaeschna trinervulata =

Species of dragonfly

Heliaeschna trinervulata is a species of dragonfly in the family Aeshnidae. It is known commonly as the pale duskhawker. This dragonfly is found in Cameroon, the Democratic Republic of the Congo, Malawi, Mozambique, Tanzania, Uganda, Zambia, and possibly Nigeria. Its natural habitat is subtropical or tropical moist lowland forests.
