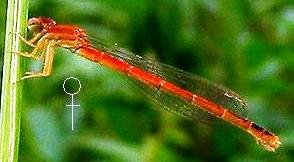

Conservation status
- Least Concern (IUCN 3.1)

Scientific classification
- Kingdom: Animalia
- Phylum: Arthropoda
- Class: Insecta
- Order: Odonata
- Suborder: Zygoptera
- Family: Coenagrionidae
- Genus: Amphiagrion
- Species: A. saucium

Binomial name
- Amphiagrion saucium (Burmeister, 1839)
- range map from 2025

= Amphiagrion saucium =

Species of damselfly

Amphiagrion saucium, the eastern red damsel, is a species of narrow-winged damselfly in the family Coenagrionidae. It is found in North America.

The IUCN conservation status of Amphiagrion saucium is "LC", least concern, with no immediate threat to the species' survival. The population is stable. The IUCN status was reviewed in 2017.

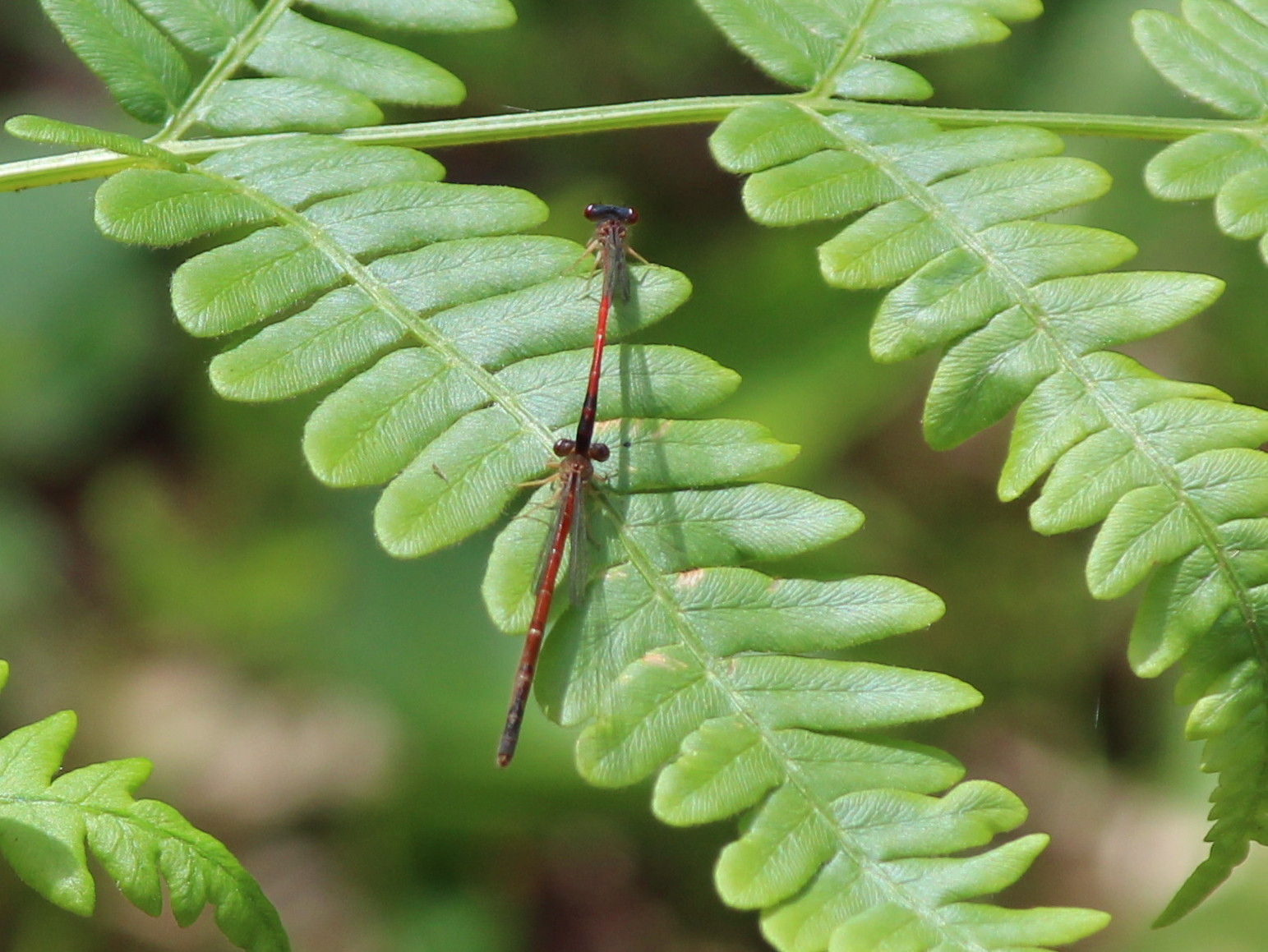
pair

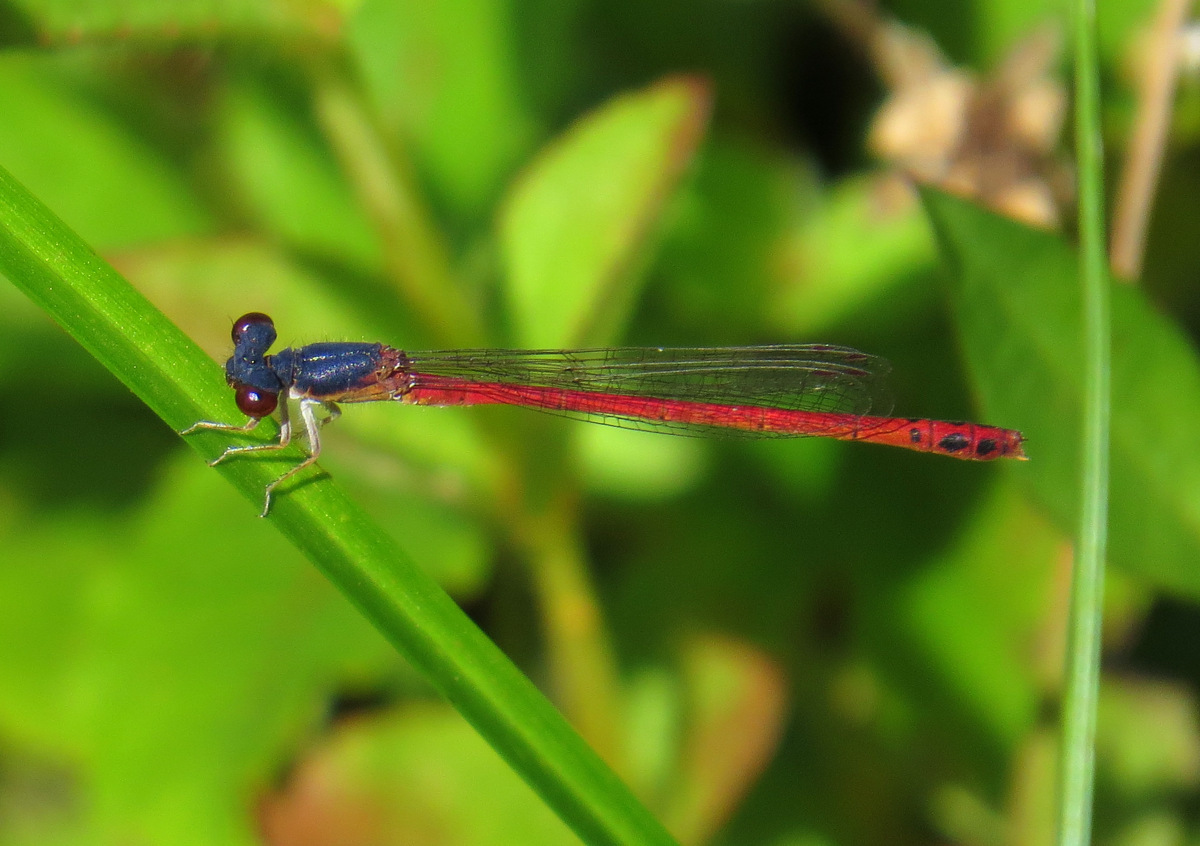
Male

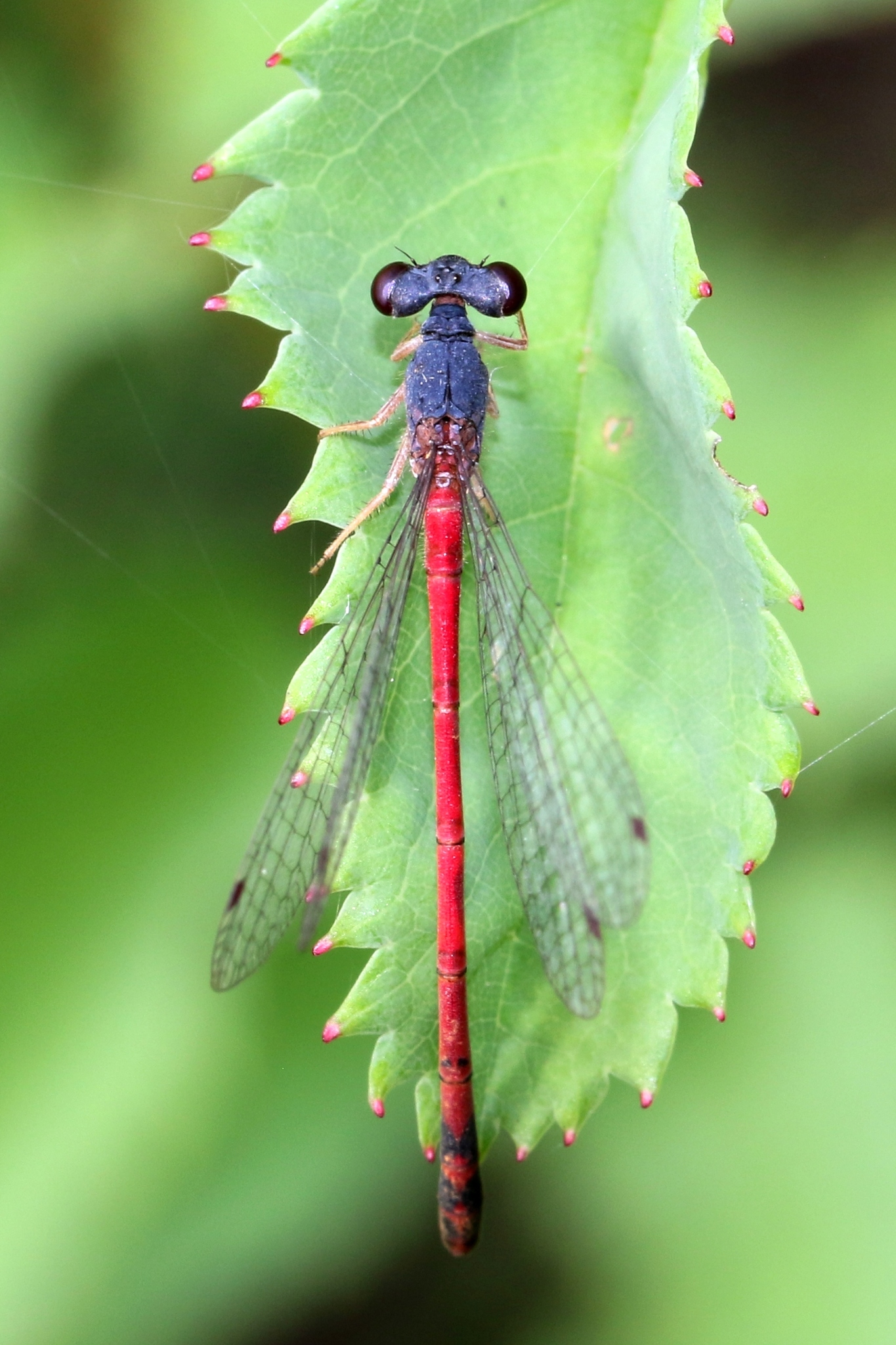
from above

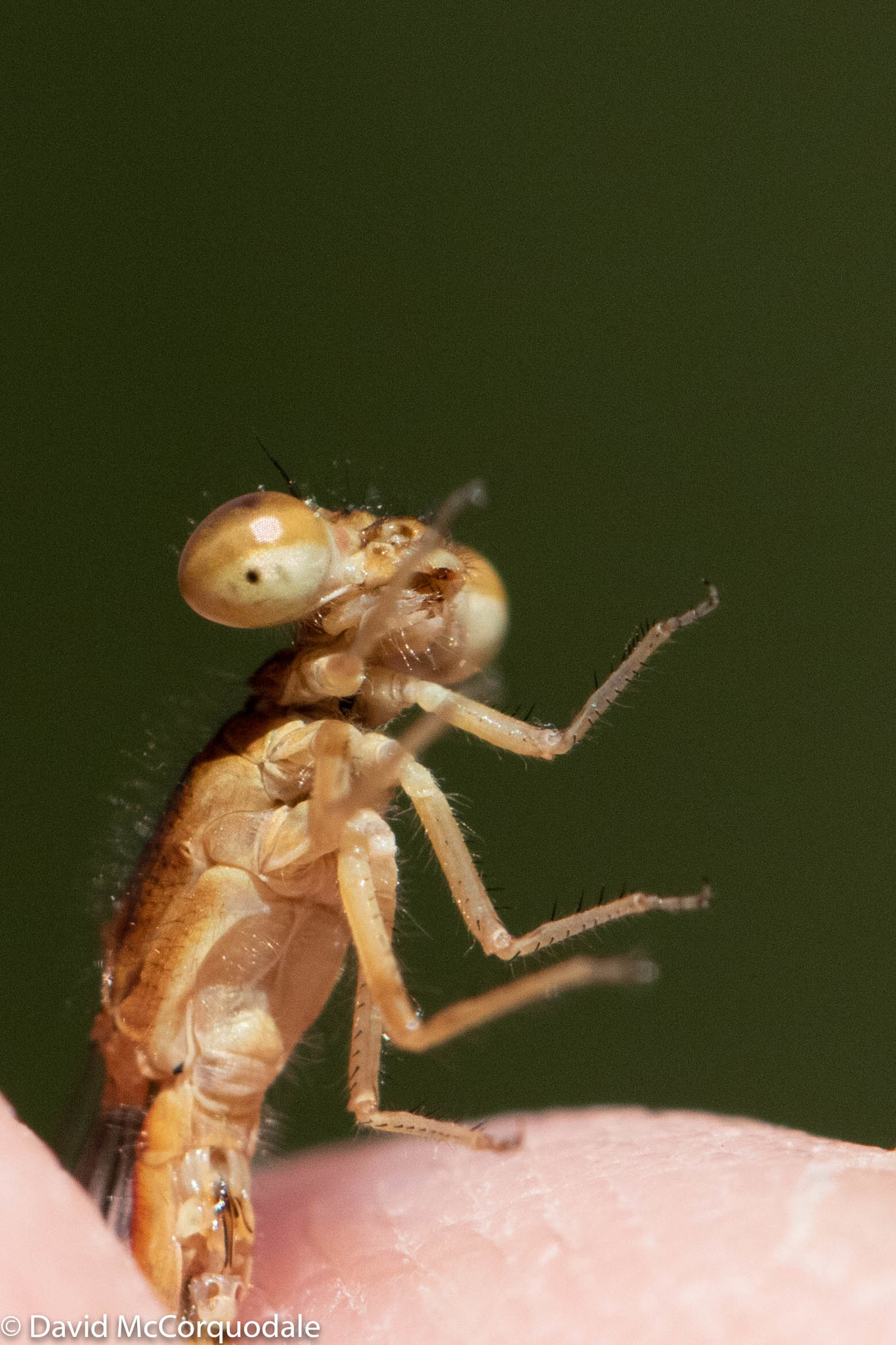
Male note the secondary genitalia, the hamulus

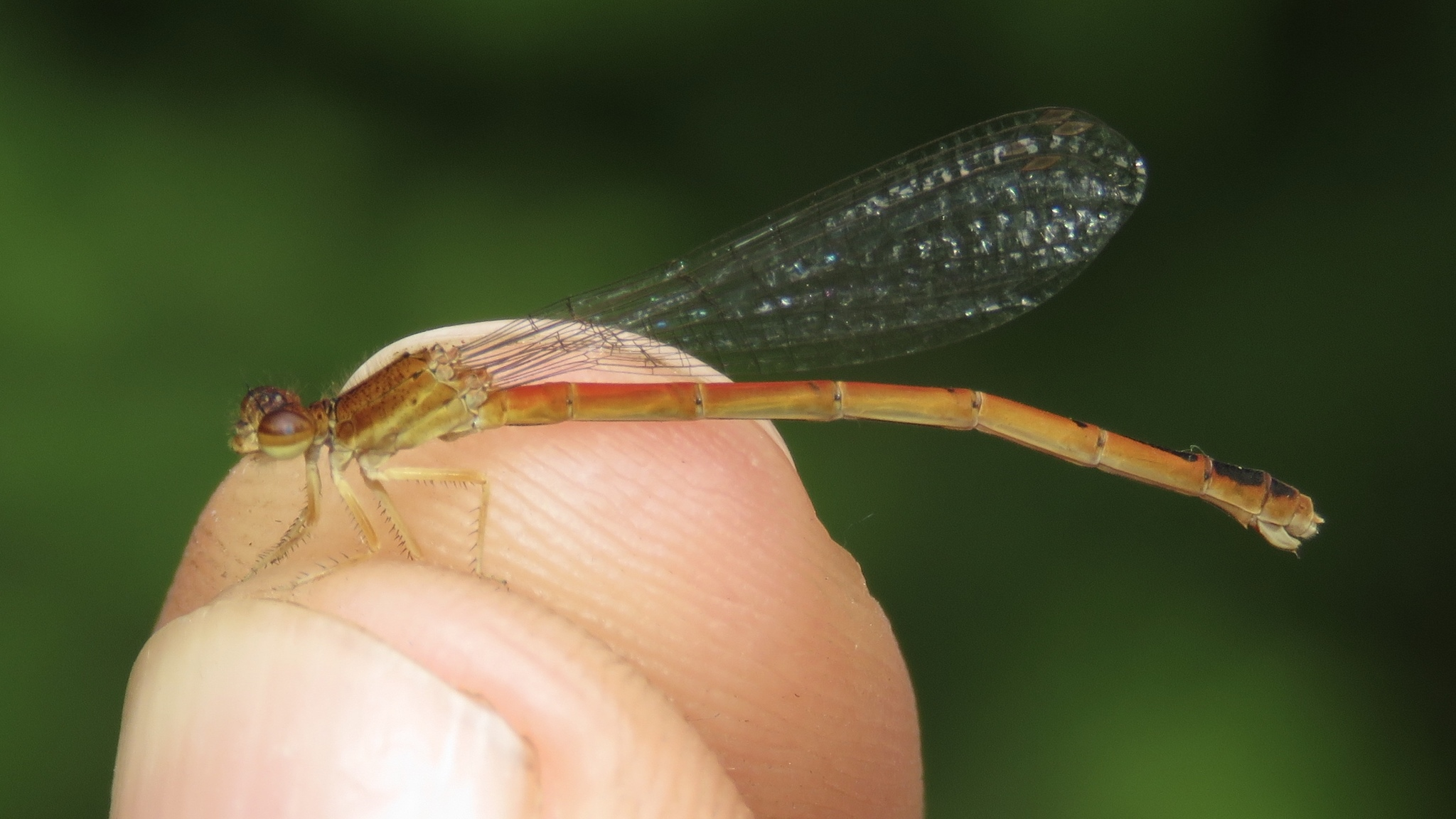
female
- Media related to Amphiagrion saucium at Wikimedia Commons
