= Heliaeschna ugandica =

Conservation status
- Least Concern (IUCN 3.1)

Scientific classification
- Kingdom: Animalia
- Phylum: Arthropoda
- Class: Insecta
- Order: Odonata
- Infraorder: Anisoptera
- Family: Aeshnidae
- Genus: Heliaeschna
- Species: H. ugandica

Binomial name
- Heliaeschna ugandica McLachlan, 1896

Species of dragonfly

Heliaeschna ugandica is a species of dragonfly in the family Aeshnidae, known commonly as the Uganda duskhawker. It is found in Angola, the Democratic Republic of the Congo, and Uganda. Its natural habitat is subtropical or tropical moist lowland forests.
