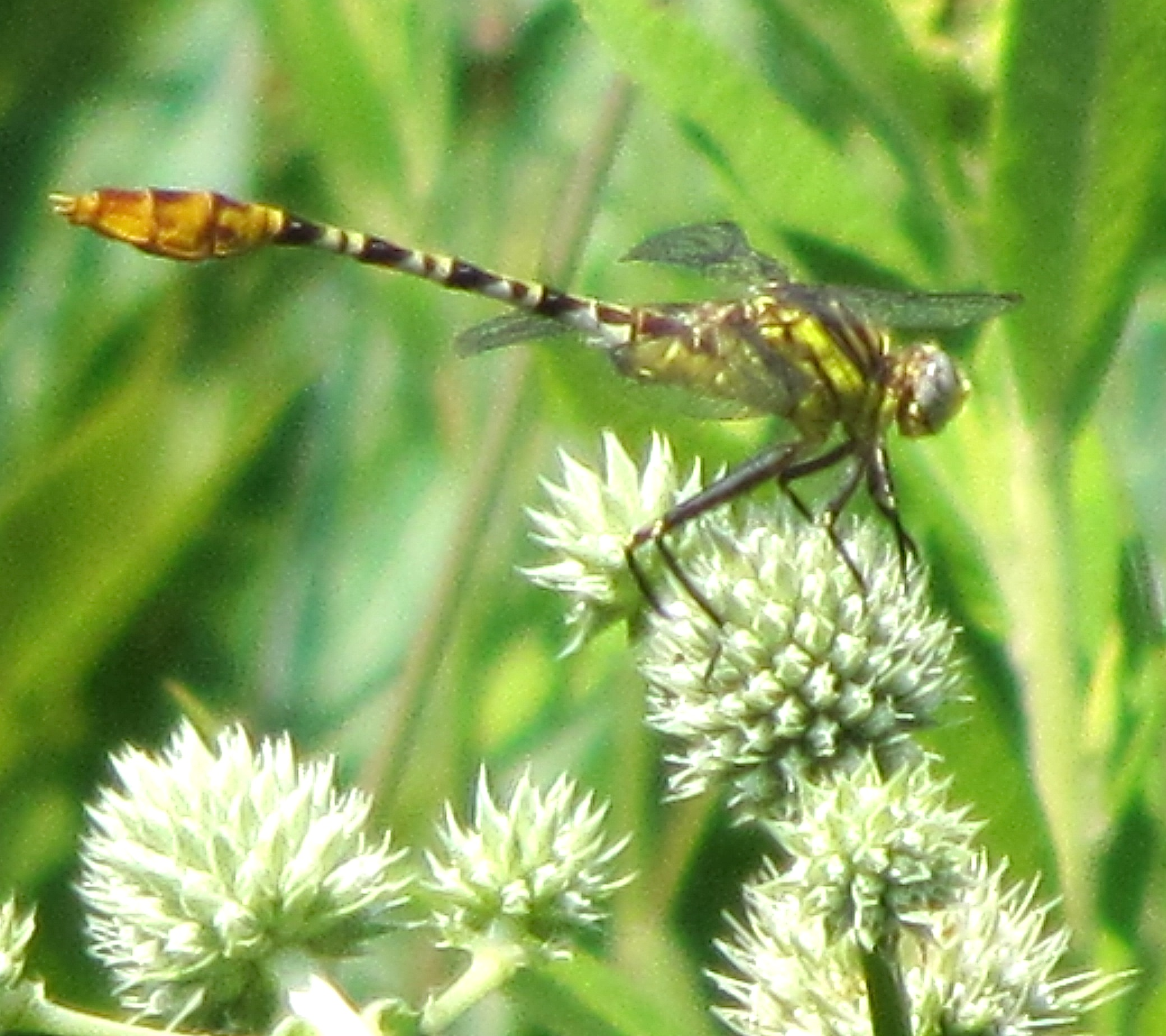

Conservation status
- Least Concern (IUCN 3.1)

Scientific classification
- Kingdom: Animalia
- Phylum: Arthropoda
- Class: Insecta
- Order: Odonata
- Infraorder: Anisoptera
- Family: Gomphidae
- Genus: Dromogomphus
- Species: D. spoliatus

Binomial name
- Dromogomphus spoliatus (Hagen in Selys, 1858)

= Dromogomphus spoliatus =

Species of dragonfly

Dromogomphus spoliatus, the flag-tailed spinyleg, is a species of clubtail in the dragonfly family Gomphidae. It is found in North America.

The IUCN conservation status of Dromogomphus spoliatus is "LC", least concern, with no immediate threat to the species' survival. The population is stable. The IUCN status was reviewed in 2017.
