= Augustin Dumon-Dumortier =

Belgian industrialist, diplomat and liberal politician (1791-1852)

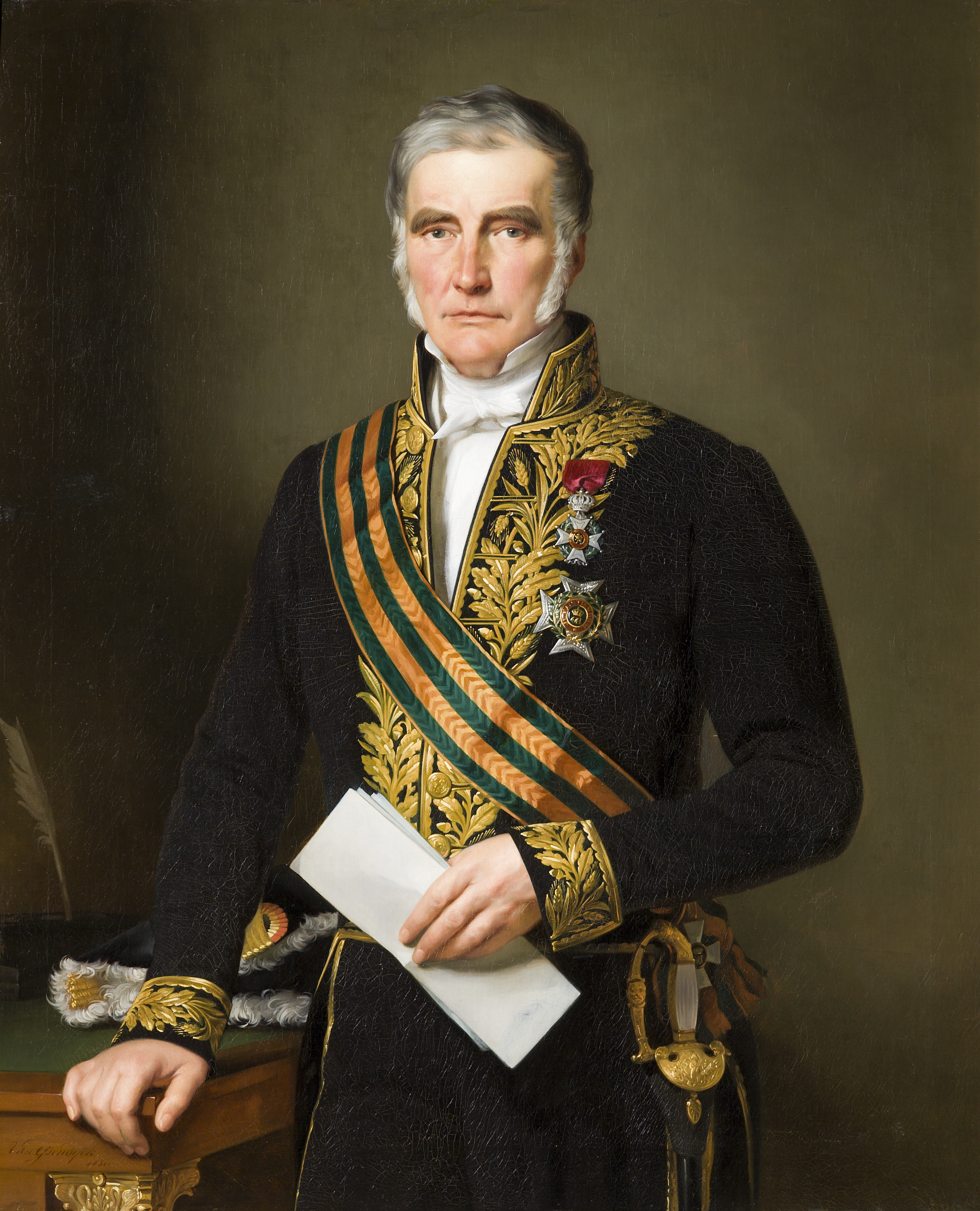

President of the Senate
- In office 27 June 1848 – 28 January 1852
- Preceded by: Louis de Schiervel
- Succeeded by: Eugène de Ligne d'Amblise et d'Epinoy

Personal details
- Born: 4 December 1791 Lille, France
- Died: 28 January 1852 (aged 60) Tournai, Belgium
- Party: Liberal Party

Augustin Aimable Dumon-Dumortier (4 December 1791 – 28 January 1852) was a Belgian industrialist, diplomat and liberal politician.

== Life and career ==
Born at Lille, he was President of the Belgian Senate from 27 June 1848 until 28 January 1852, governor of the province of Hainaut and burgomaster of Tournai. In 1849, he was sent to the Netherlands as a special envoy to congratulate William III upon his coronation. This was 19 years after the Belgian Revolution, which had made an end to the United Kingdom of the Netherlands.

He was a chevalier de l'ordre de Leopold, and he received the Dutch grand-croix de l'ordre de la Couronne de Chêne.

Dumon-Dumortier died at Tournai in 1852.

== Honours ==
- 1849: Knight Grand Cross of the Order of the Oak Crown.

== See also ==
- Liberal Party
- Liberalism in Belgium

== Sources ==
- A. Scheler, Annuaire statistique et historique belge, Brussel – Leipzig, 1854, pp. 313-315.
- Augustin Dumon-Dumortier (D)

Political offices
Preceded by Louis de Schiervel	President of the Senate; 1848–1852	Succeeded by Eugène de Ligne d'Amblise et d'Epinoy
