= Phyllogomphus annulus =

Conservation status
- Least Concern (IUCN 3.1)

Scientific classification
- Kingdom: Animalia
- Phylum: Arthropoda
- Class: Insecta
- Order: Odonata
- Infraorder: Anisoptera
- Family: Gomphidae
- Genus: Phyllogomphus
- Species: P. annulus

Binomial name
- Phyllogomphus annulus Klots, 1944

Species of dragonfly

Phyllogomphus annulus is a species of dragonfly in the family Gomphidae. It is found in Angola, the Democratic Republic of the Congo, and Uganda. Its natural habitats are subtropical or tropical moist lowland forests and intermittent rivers.
