= Eugène, 8th Prince of Ligne =

Eugène de Ligne d'Amblise et d'Epinoy
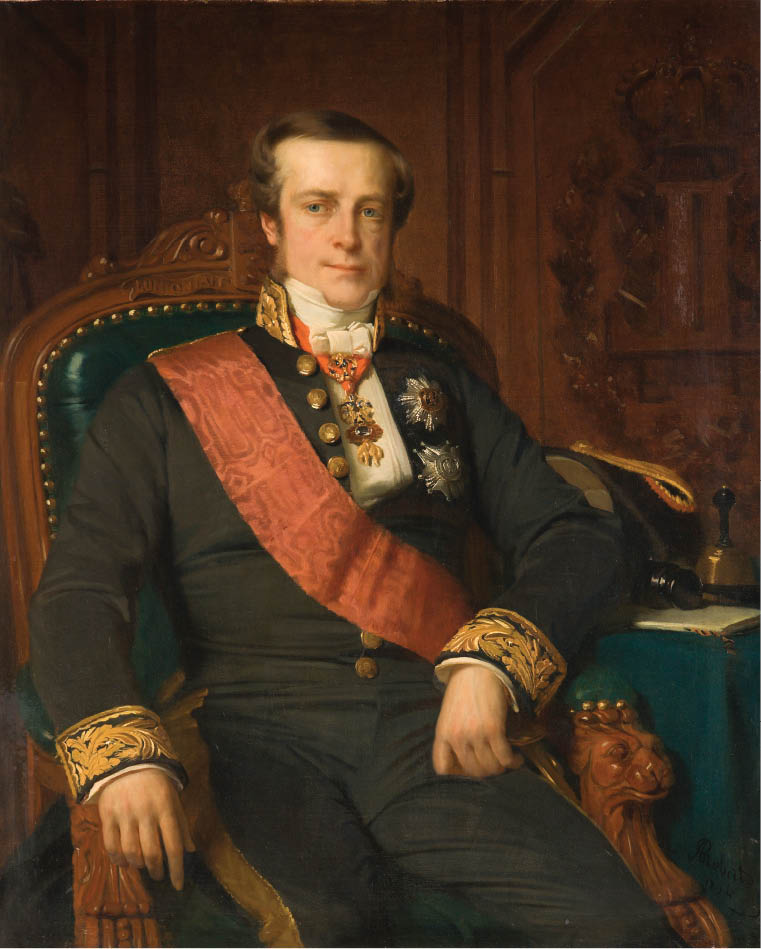

President of the Senate
- In office 25 March 1852 – 11 November 1879
- Preceded by: Augustin Dumon-Dumortier
- Succeeded by: Camille de Tornaco

Personal details
- Born: 28 January 1804 Brussels, France (now Belgium)
- Died: 20 May 1880 (aged 76) Brussels, Belgium
- Party: Liberal Party

Prince of Ligne
- Reign: 13 December 1814 – 20 May 1880
- Predecessor: Charles-Joseph
- Successor: Louis
- Spouse: Amélie Mélanie de Conflans (m. 1823; died 1833) Nathalie de Trazegnies (m. 1834; died 1835) Princess Jadwiga Lubomirska (m. 1836; died 1880)
- Issue: Henri; Louis; Nathalie; Charles; Edouard; Isabelle; Marie Georgine
Names
- Eugène François Charles Joseph Lamoral de Ligne
- House: House of Ligne
- Father: Prince Louis-Eugène de Ligne
- Mother: Louise van der Noot, Countess de Duras

Eugène François Charles Joseph Lamoral de Ligne d'Amblise et d'Epinoy (28 January 1804 – 20 May 1880), 8th Prince of Ligne and of the Holy Roman Empire was a Belgian diplomat and liberal politician.

== Early life ==
He was born in Brussels on 28 January 1804. He was the son of Louis Eugene Marie Lamoral, Prince of Ligne, and Countess Louise van der Noot de Duras.

== Career ==
He lived in Vienna from 1834 until 1837. After his return to Belgium, he was named ambassador and sent to London for the coronation of Queen Victoria. He had a successful diplomatic career. In 1849 he was elected as a member of the Belgian parliament and was President of the Belgian Senate, in succession of Augustin Dumon-Dumortier, from 25 March 1852 until 18 July 1879. In 1863 the King named him Minister of State.

== Personal life ==
Eugène was married three times. His first marriage was on 12 May 1823 to Amélie Mélanie de Conflans (1802–1833), a daughter of Charles Louis Gabriel de Conflans, Marquis d'Armentières and Amélie Gabrielle de Croÿ. Before her death in Florence in March 1833, they were the parents of:

- Prince Henri Maximilien Joseph Charles Louis Lamoral (1824–1871), who married Marie Louise Marguerite de Talleyrand-Périgord, a daughter of Ernest de Talleyrand-Périgord. Ancestor of the elder branch of Ligne, of Philippe de Lannoy, of his daughter Stéphanie, Grand Duchess of Luxembourg and her son Prince Charles of Luxembourg (born 2020).
- Prince Louis (1827–1845), who died unmarried.

After the death of his first wife, he married Nathalie Charlotte Auguste de Trazegnies (1811–1835) on 28 July 1834, a daughter of Georges Philippe de Trazegnies, Marquess of Trazegnies and Countess Marie Louise van Maldeghem. His second wife died a few days after giving birth to their only child:

- Princess Natalie (1835–1863), who married Rudolf, 11th Duke of Croÿ, son of Alfred, 10th Duke of Croÿ and Princess Eleonore of Salm-Salm.

His third, and final, marriage was on 28 October 1836 to Princess Jadwiga Julia Wanda Lubomirska (1815–1895), a daughter of Polish Prince Henryk Ludwik Lubomirski, who settled in Austria, and Princess Teresa Czartoryska (daughter of Prince Józef Klemens Czartorysk). Together, they were the parents of:

- Prince Charles Joseph Eugène (1837–1914), who married Charlotte de Gontaut-Biron, a daughter of Etienne Charles de Gontaut-Biron and Charlotte Marie de Fitz-James (a daughter of the 7th Duke of Fitz-James).
- Prince Edouard Henri Auguste (1839–1911), who married Princess Eulalia of Solms-Braunfels, daughter of Prince Carl of Solms-Braunfels and Princess Sophie of Löwenstein-Wertheim-Rosenberg (widow of Prince Franz of Salm-Salm).
- Princess Isabelle (1840–1858), who died young.
- Princess Marie Georgine Sophie Hedwige Eugenie (1843–1911), who married Sosthène II de La Rochefoucauld, 4th Duke of Doudeauville, a grandson of Ambroise-Polycarpe de La Rochefoucauld.

He died in Brussels on 20 May 1880 and was buried in Belœil, near Château de Belœil, the estate of the House of Ligne. As his eldest son predeceased him in 1871, he was succeeded as Prince of Ligne by his grandson, Louis.

=== Descendants ===
Through his eldest son Prince Henri, he was a grandfather of Louis, 9th Prince of Ligne (1854–1918). Prince Henri also had an illegitimate child with the actress Sarah Bernhardt, Maurice Bernhardt (1864–1921), who married Princess Maria "Terka" Jabłonowska (daughter of Prince Karol Jabłonowski). Henri was also the paternal grandfather of Prince Eugène de Ligne, and a great-great grandfather of Carlo Alessandro, 3rd Duke of Castel Duino.

Through his daughter Princess Natalie, he was the grandfather of Princess Isabella of Croÿ (1856–1931), who married Archduke Friedrich, Duke of Teschen.

Through his son Prince Edouard, he was a grandfather of Prince Albert de Ligne (1874–1957), the Belgian Ambassador to the United States.

Through his son Prince Charles, he is the paternal grandfather of Henri-Florent Lamoral.

Through his daughter Princess Marie, he is a grandfather of Édouard de La Rochefoucauld, and a great-great-grandfather of François d'Harcourt.

He is also an ancestor of the future monarch of Luxembourg.

== Honours ==
National

- Kingdom of Belgium: Grand Cordon in the Order of Leopold, 16 June 1838

Foreign

- Kingdom of Bavaria:
  - Knight of the Order of Saint Hubert
  - Knight Grand Cross in the Order of Saint Michael
- Kingdom of France: Knight Grand Cross in the Legion of Honour, 22 August 1846
- Holy See: Knight, 1st Class in the Order of Pope Pius IX
- Sovereign Military Order of Malta: Knight of the Order of Saint John of Jerusalem
- Kingdom of Prussia: Knight of the Order of the Black Eagle
- Saxe-Coburg and Gotha: Knight Grand Cross in the Saxe-Ernestine House Order
- Kingdom of Spain:
  - Grandee of Spain, 1st Class
  - Knight of the Golden Fleece
- (Kingdom of the Two Sicilies) Two Sicilian Royal Family: Knight Grand Cross in the Order of Saint Januarius

== See also ==
- Liberal Party
- Liberalism in Belgium

== Sources ==
- Eugène de Ligne d'Amblise et d'Epinoy, archived from the original on 27 December 2010
- De Ligne, Albert (1940), Le prince Eugène de Ligne 1804–1880 (Universelle ed.), Brussels, p. 404
- De Paepe, Jean-Luc; Raindorf-Gérard, Christiane, eds. (1996), Le Parlement Belge 1831–1894. Données Biographiquesb, Brussels: Académie Royale de Belgique, pp. 166–167
- Douxchamps, José (2003), Présence nobiliaire au parlement belge (1830–1970), Notes généalogiques (in French), Wépion, Namen: José Douxchamps, p. 74

Eugène, 8th Prince of Ligne House of Ligne Born: 28 January 1804 Died: 20 May 1880
Titles of nobility in Belgium
Preceded by Charles-Joseph	Prince of Ligne; 1814–1880	Succeeded by Louis
Political offices
Preceded by Augustin Dumon-Dumortier	President of the Senate; 1852–1879	Succeeded by Camille de Tornaco
