= Royal Belgian Entomological Society =

Learned society in Belgium

- Société royale belge d'Entomologie Koninklijke Belgische Vereniging voor Entomologie
- Formation: April 9, 1855; 171 years ago
- Founding president: Edmond de Sélys Longchamps

The Royal Belgian Entomological Society (French: Société royale belge d'Entomologie, pronounced [sɔsjete ʁwajal bɛlʒə dɑ̃tɔmɔlɔʒi]; Dutch: Koninklijke Belgische Vereniging voor Entomologie, pronounced [ˈkoːnɪŋkləkə ˈbɛlɣisə vəˈreːnəɣɪŋ voːr ˌɛntoːmoːloːˈɣi]) is a learned society based in Brussels. It is devoted to entomology, the study of insects. It was founded on 9 April 1855 with Edmond de Sélys Longchamps as its first president.

The society publishes the Bulletin, the Belgian Journal of Entomology and the Mémoires.
