= List of presidents of the Senate (Belgium) =

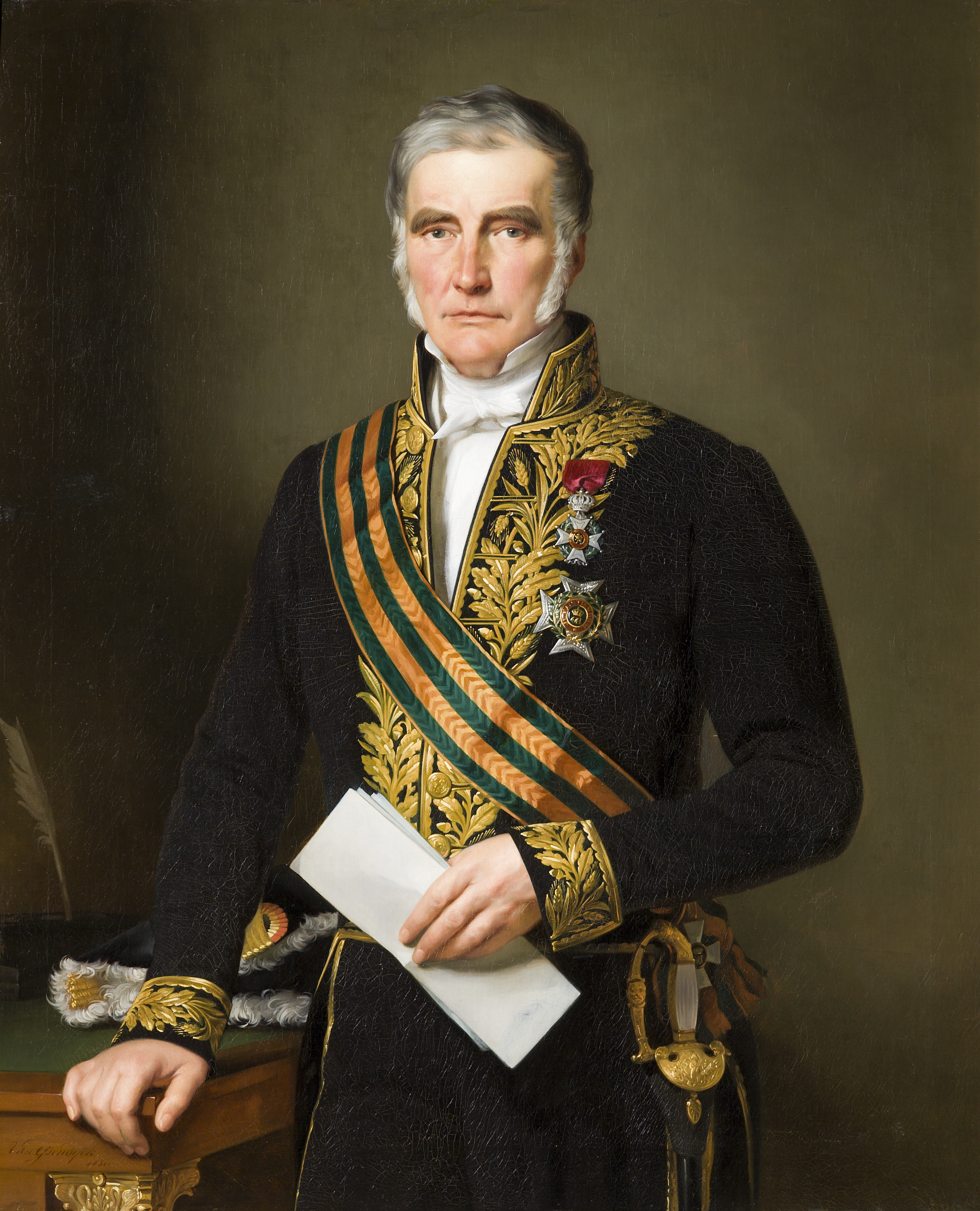
Dumon-Dumortier

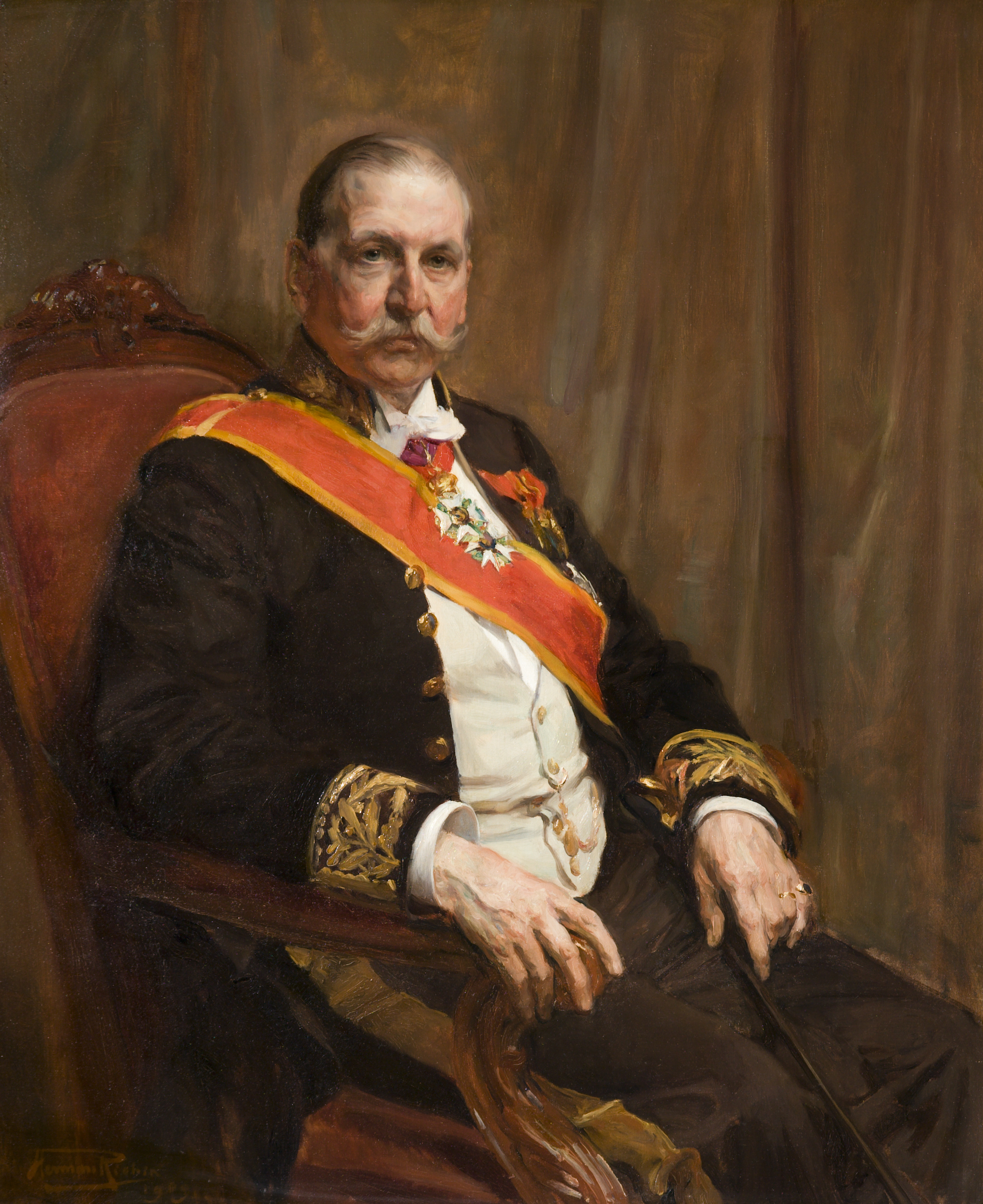
Alfred Simonis

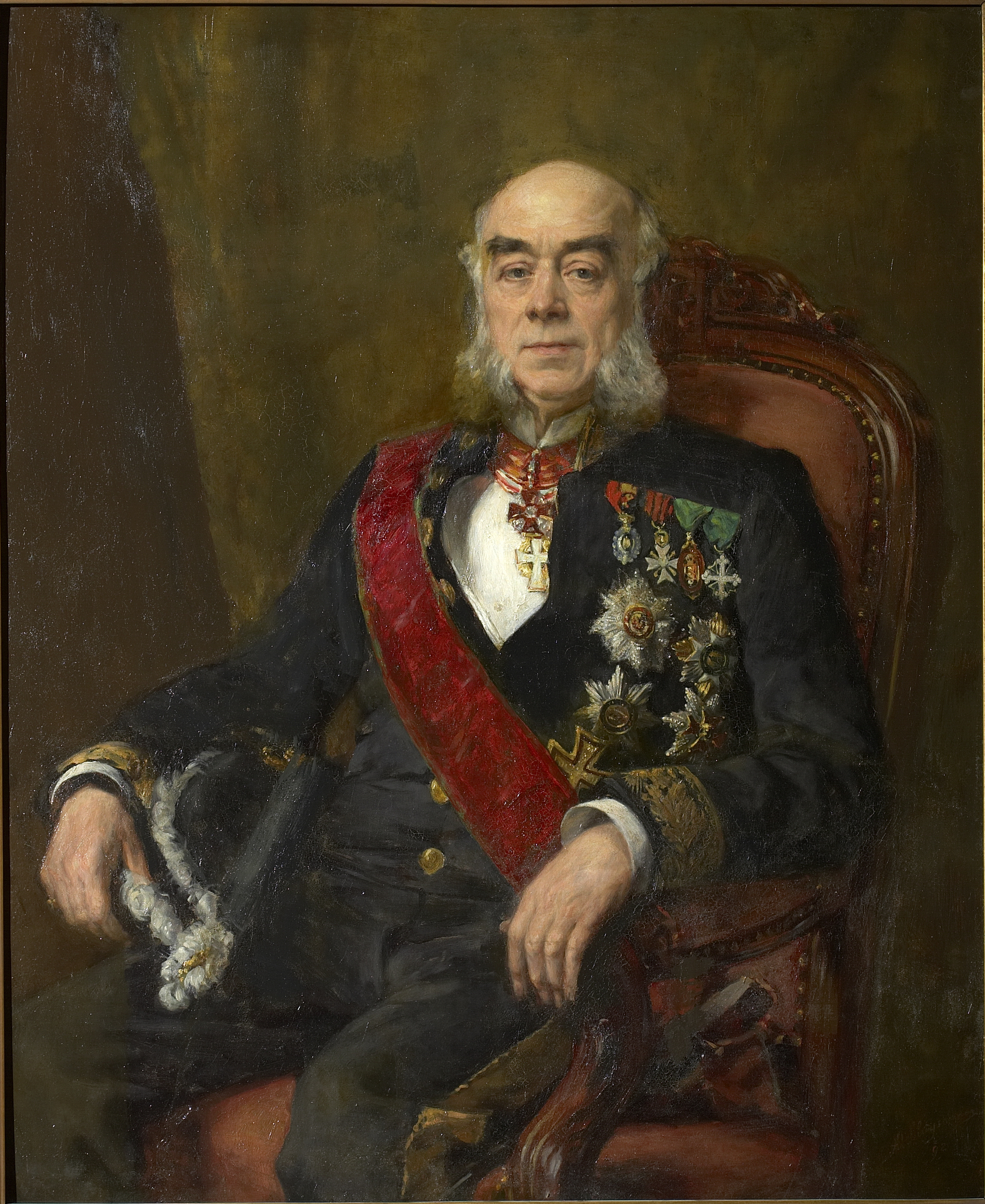
Henri 't Kint de Roodenbeke

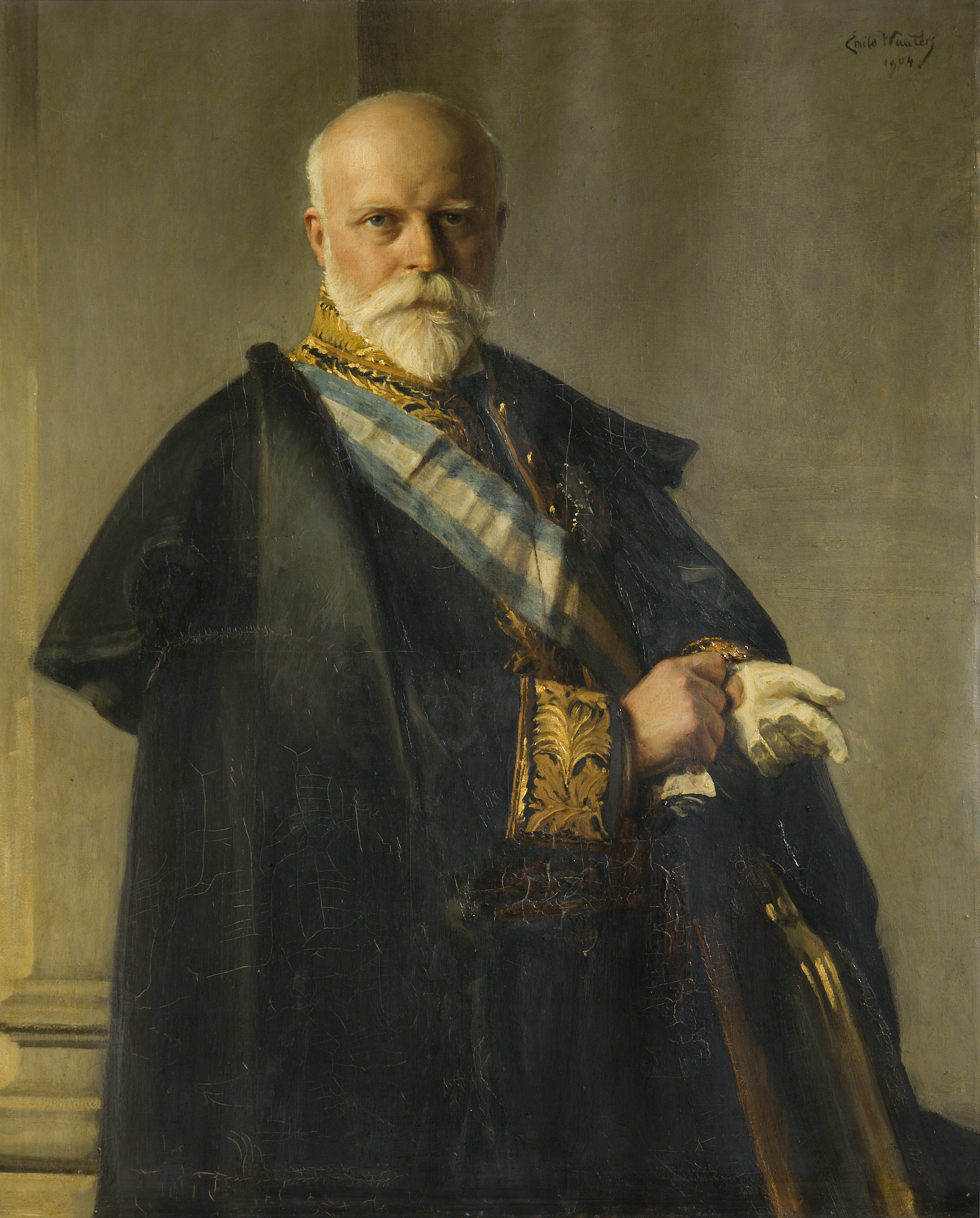
Marie Joseph Charles, 6th Duke d'Ursel

The president of the Senate (Dutch: voorzitter van de Senaat, French: président du Sénat) is the presiding officer of the upper house of the Federal Parliament of Belgium. The current president of the Senate is Vincent Blondel.

It is custom that the president gets its portrait painted by an artist, in the collection of art of the Senate some famous works can be found like portraits painted by Alfred Cluysenaar.

No.	Name	Party	Entered office	Left office
Senate fully equal to the Chamber of Representatives
1.	Goswin Baron de Stassart	Liberal	12 September 1831	14 June 1838
2.	Louis Baron de Schiervel	Catholic	13 November 1838	27 May 1848
3.	Augustin Dumon-Dumortier	Liberal Party	27 June 1848	28 January 1852
4.	Eugène Prince of Ligne, of Amblise and of Epinoy	Liberal Party	25 March 1852	18 July 1879
5.	Camille Baron de Tornaco	Liberal Party	11 November 1879	8 March 1880
6.	Michel Edmond Baron de Sélys-Longchamps	Liberal Party	3 August 1880	28 May 1884
7.	Jules Baron d'Anethan	Catholic Party	23 July 1884	19 August 1885
8.	Charles Count de Merode-Westerloo	Catholic Party	10 November 1885	6 April 1892
9.	Henri Baron t'Kint de Roodenbeke de Naeyer	Catholic Party	26 April 1892	10 November 1899
10.	Marie Joseph Charles, 6th Duke d'Ursel	Catholic Party	14 November 1899	15 November 1903
11.	Henri Count de Merode-Westerloo	Catholic Party	2 December 1903	13 July 1908
12.	Alfred Viscount Simonis	Catholic Party	28 August 1908	5 August 1911
13.	Paul Baron de Favereau	Catholic Union	14 November 1911	26 September 1922
14.	Arnold Count t'Kint de Roodenbeke	Catholic Union	14 November 1922	10 August 1928
15.	Charles Magnette	Liberal Party	13 November 1928	28 October 1932
16.	Emile Digneffe	Liberal Party	27 December 1932	11 August 1934
17.	Maurice Count Lippens	Liberal Party	13 November 1934	13 April 1936
18.	Romain Baron Moyersoen	Catholic Block	1 July 1936	6 March 1939
19.	Robert Gillon	Liberal Party	26 April 1939	8 November 1947
20.	Henri Rolin	BSP-PSB	11 November 1947	6 November 1949
21.	Robert Gillon	Liberal Party	8 November 1949	30 April 1950
22.	Paul Struye	CVP–PSC	27 June 1950	12 March 1954
23.	Robert Gillon	Liberal Party	5 May 1954	29 April 1958
24.	Paul Struye	CVP–PSC	24 June 1958	5 October 1973
25.	Pierre Harmel	PSC	9 October, 1973	9 March 1977
26.	Robert Vandekerckhove	CVP	7 June 1977	23 February 1980
27.	Edward Leemans	CVP	5 March 1980	6 November 1987
28.	Roger Lallemand	PS	10 March 1988	9 May 1988
29.	Lambert Kelchtermans	CVP	16 May 1988	10 October 1988
30.	Frank Swaelen	CVP	11 October 1988	12 April 1995
Senate quasi-equal to the Chamber of Representatives
30.	Frank Swaelen	CVP	8 June 1995	5 May 1999
31.	Armand De Decker	MR	14 July 1999	20 July 2004
32.	Anne-Marie Lizin	PS	20 July 2004	2 May 2007
33.	Armand De Decker	MR	12 July 2007	7 May 2010
34.	Danny Pieters	N-VA	20 July 2010	10 October 2011
35.	Sabine de Bethune	CD&V	11 October 2011	14 October 2014
Senate as reflection platform with very limited power
36.	Christine Defraigne	MR	14 October 2014	3 December 2018
37.	Jacques Brotchi	MR	14 December 2018	23 May 2019
38.	Sabine Laruelle	MR	18 July 2019	13 October 2020
39.	Stephanie D'Hose	Open Vld	13 October 2020	18 May 2024
40.	Valérie De Bue	MR	25 July 2024	3 February 2025
41.	Vincent Blondel	LE	3 February 2025	Incumbent

== See also ==
- Belgian Senate
- List of presidents of the Belgian Chamber of Representatives
- Politics of Belgium

== Sources ==
- Laureys, Véronique; Mark Van den Wijngaert; Luc François; Emmanuel Gerard; Jean-Pierre Nandrin; Jean Stengers (1999). De geschiedenis van de Belgische Senaat: 1831-1995. Tielt: Lannoo. ISBN 90-209-3682-4.
