= Edmond de Sélys Longchamps =

Belgian politician and scientist

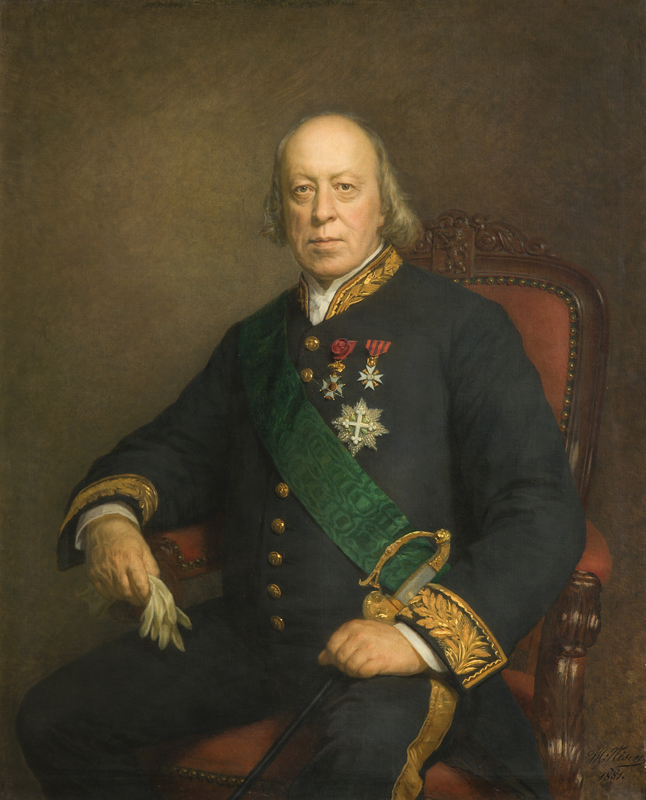
- Edmond de Selys Longchamps, wearing the (green) Order of Saints Maurice and Lazarus.

President of the Senate
- In office 3 August 1880 – 23 July 1884
- Preceded by: Camille de Tornaco
- Succeeded by: Jules d'Anethan

Personal details
- Born: 25 May 1813 Paris, France
- Died: 11 December 1900 (aged 87) Liège, Belgium
- Party: Liberal Party
- Scientific career
- Born: Edmond de Sélys Longchamps
- Fields: Zoology, Odonatology
- Author abbrev. (zoology): Sélys

Coat of arms of Selys-Longchamps

Baron Michel Edmond de Selys Longchamps (Note: Pronunciation: French: [lɔ̃ʃɑ̃]) (25 May 1813 – 11 December 1900) was a Belgian Liberal Party politician and scientist. Selys Longchamps has been regarded as the founding figure of odonatology, the study of the dragonflies and damselflies. His wealth and influence enabled him to amass one of the finest collections of neuroptera insects and to describe many species from around the world. His collection is housed in the Royal Belgian Institute of Natural Sciences.

== Biography ==
Selys was a wealthy aristocrat born in Paris to Michel Laurent de Selys Longchamps and Marie-Denise Gandolphe. He was educated at home by private tutors and never attended school or university. Nevertheless, he became known as the world's leading authority on Odonata as well as an expert on Neuroptera and European Orthoptera. He was also a leading ornithologist. A Liberal Party representative in the Belgian Parliament, he became Councillor for Waremme in 1846, entered the Belgian Senate in 1855, and was finally elected President of the Belgian Senate from 1880 to 1884.

His early interest in birds is shown by a book of coloured figures of Belgian species painted when he was 16. Ornithology remained a lifelong interest and he assembled an ornithological museum at Waremme, maintaining very large collections of birds, both European and exotic, including a great auk and an egg. He was also interested in small mammals. At 18 (1831), he published his first scientific paper, a list of the insects of Liège and in 1837 a list of the dragonflies or Odonata and butterflies and moths or Lepidoptera of Belgium. From that date on, a continuous flow of papers on the Odonata appeared. The works were often monographic, examples being, 1840 Monographie des Libellulides d'Europe and 1850 Revue des Odonates d'Europe, two large works on "Gomphines" and "Calopterygines". There were also systematic works containing phylogenetic analyses, tables and keys) of the "Gomphines", Calopterygines", Agrionines", "Cordulines" and ( generic only) "Aeschnines", the only family not so treated being the difficult "Libellulines". There were (very numerous) local faunas for dragonflies (synopses), appendices to travel works, phylogenetic and morphological notes.

Selys met and began a collaboration with Hermann August Hagen in 1845; They jointly produced the Revue and two monographs. Hagen also aided work on the Synopses and sometimes Selys is given as the author in Kirby's catalogue when Hagen is (in many such instances it is clearly stated by Selys that he had never seen the insects and that Hagen was the author). Selys is the properly attributed author of well over 1,000 species, an enormous number compared to Hagen and more than half of known species. Aware of being an "homme distrait" (distracted man), Selys often affixed names to undescribed species in his collection (nomina nuda). This led to much later nomenclatural confusion. Selys was an inveterate traveller, spending long periods in most European countries and being an honorary member of almost all European entomological societies including the Royal Entomological Society which so honoured him in 1871. He helped to found the Société Entomologique de Belgique in 1856. He was elected as a member of the American Philosophical Society in 1873.

He amassed the greatest collection of Neuroptera and Orthoptera in the world, incorporating the collections of Pierre André Latreille, Jules Pièrre Rambur, Jean Guillaume Audinet-Serville, and Félix Édouard Guérin-Méneville, and wrote over 250 papers some of which are masterworks. His collection is in the Royal Belgian Institute of Natural Sciences, although there are de Selys types in many other museums, including the Hope Department of Entomology, University of Oxford. He died at Liège.

== Honours ==
- Belgium: 1882: Grand Cordon in the Order of Leopold.
- Kingdom of Italy: Knight Grand Cross in the Order of Saints Maurice and Lazarus.
- France: Commander in the Legion of Honour.

== Works ==
Selys published over 250 works on entomology, ornithology and other topics in natural history:

Odonata

- 1840. Monographie des Libellulidées d'Europe Brussels, 220 pages.
- 1842. Faune Belge
- 1850 with Hermann August Hagen. Revue des odonates ou Libellules d'Europe. Mémoires de la Société Royale des Sciences de Liége 6:1–408. Downloadable at Gallica
- 1853. Synopsis des Calopterygines. Bulletin de l'Académie royale des Sciences de Belgique (1)20:1–73 (reprint 1–73).
- 1854. Synopsis des Gomphines. Bulletin de l'Académie royale des Sciences de Belgique 21:23–114.
- 1854. Monographie des Calopterygines. Mémoires de la Société Royale des Sciences de Liége 9:1–292
- 1858. Monographie des Gomphines. Mémoires de la Société Royale des Sciences de Liége 11:257–713
- 1862. Synopsis des agrionines, seconde légion: Lestes. Bulletin de l'Académie royale des Sciences de Belgique (2)13:288–338 (reprint 1–54).
- 1871. Synopsis des Cordulines. Bulletin de l'Académie royale des Sciences de Belgique (2)31:238–316;519-565.
- 1876. Synopsis des agrionines, cinquième légion: Agrion (suite). Le grand genre Agrion. Bulletin de l'Académie royale des Sciences de Belgique (2) 41:247–322, 496–539, 1233–1309 (reprint 1–199).
- 1883. Synopsis des Aeschnines. Première partie: Classification. Bulletin de l'Académie royale des Sciences de Belgique 3(5):712–748.

Birds

- Observations sur les phénomènes périodique du règne animal, et particulièrement sur les migrations des oiseaux en Belgique, de 1841 à 1846 Mémoires de l'Académie Royale des Sciences, des Lettres et des Beaux-Arts de Belgique 21 pdf from GDZ

General

- Faune belge. Première partie. Indication méthodique des mammifères, oiseaux, reptiles et poissons, observés jusqu'ici en Belgique. Faune Belge i–xii + 1–310 (1842)

== See also ==
- Liberal Party
- Liberalism in Belgium

== Notes ==
Political offices
Preceded by Camille de Tornaco	President of the Senate; 1880–1884	Succeeded by Jules d'Anethan
