= List of members of the Senate of Belgium, 2019–2024 =

This is a list of members of the Senate of Belgium during the 55th legislature (2019–2024).

== Grouping Presidents ==
Group	President
New Flemish Alliance	Karl Vanlouwe
Ecolo-Groen	Hélène Ryckmans
Vlaams Belang	Guy D'haeseleer
PS	Latifa Gahouchi (until 2019) Christie Morreale (from 2019)
MR	Sabine Laruelle Georges-Louis Bouchez; Alexander Miesen; Jean-Paul Wahl
CD&V	Sabine de Bethune
Open Vld	Carina Van Cauter
PTB-PVDA	Antoine Hermant
sp.a	Bert Anciaux
cdH	André Antoine

== List ==
- Stephanie D'Hose (President of the Senate)
- Carina Van Cauter
- Karl Vanlouwe
