= 2019–2020 Belgian government formation =

In Belgium, the government formation of 2019–2020 started one day after the federal elections, regional elections and European elections which were all held simultaneously on 26 May 2019. These formations were only the second under King Philippe.

During the formation period, no less than six new governments needed to be formed: a new Federal Government and five new regional governments (Flemish, Walloon, French Community, German Community and Brussels). The elections had shown again the significant differences in voting preferences between Wallonia (left) and Flanders (right). While the Government of the German-speaking Community was formed only a few days after the elections and the Brussels Government was formed one month later, the other regional governments were only formed after the summer, in September and October 2019. At the federal level, the deadlock was never resolved, but nevertheless, a new government was formed in March 2020. Its mission was only to fight against the coronavirus, as several of the opposing parties agreed to support a new Wilmès II Government identical to the current caretaker Wilmès I Government to overcome the COVID-19 pandemic in Belgium, de facto ending the search for a new government. The new government was given special powers to deal with the COVID-19 crisis. The powers expired on 27 June 2020. Efforts to form a coalition continued during this time. The Wilmès II government continues in office in the meantime, but would have to seek a new vote of confidence on 17 September 2020 in case a new coalition was not formed before then, although this period was further extended to 1 October 2020.

== Overview ==
Government		Outgoing coalition		Next coalition		Sworn in (days after election)
Belgium	Federal Government	Michel II; Wilmès I (Note: The Wilmès I Government was a caretaker government with the same composition as the Michel II government, after Charles Michel had left his post to become President of the European Council.)	Flemish side CD&V; Open Vld; Francophone side MR	Wilmès II (Note: The Wilmès II Government was formed as a temporary minority government to combat to effects of the Coronacrisis. As of May 2020, negotiations restarted to form a new complete majority government.)	Flemish side CD&V; Open Vld; Francophone side MR	17 March 2020 (296 days)
Belgium	Federal Government	Michel II; Wilmès I	Flemish side CD&V; Open Vld; Francophone side MR	De Croo	Flemish side CD&V; Open Vld sp.a Groen; Francophone side PS; MR; Ecolo	1 October 2020 (494 days)
Flanders	Flemish Government	Bourgeois; Homans (Note: The Homans Government was an interim government with the same composition as the Bourgeois government, after Geert Bourgeois had left his post to take up his seat in the European Parliament.)	N-VA; CD&V; Open Vld	Jambon	N-VA; CD&V; Open Vld	2 October 2019 (129 days)
Wallonia	French Community Government	Demotte III	PS cdH	Jeholet	PS; Ecolo; MR	17 September 2019 (114 days)
Wallonia	Walloon Government	Borsus	MR cdH	Di Rupo III	PS; Ecolo; MR	13 September 2019 (110 days)
Brussels-Capital Region	Brussels Government	Vervoort II	Francophone side PS; Défi cdH; Flemish side Open Vld sp.a CD&V	Vervoort III	Francophone side PS; Ecolo; Défi; Flemish side Groen; Open Vld one.brussels-sp.a	17 July 2019 (52 days)
German Community in Belgium	German-speaking Community Govt.	Paasch I	ProDG; PFF; PS	Paasch II	ProDG; PFF; PS	17 June 2019 (22 days)

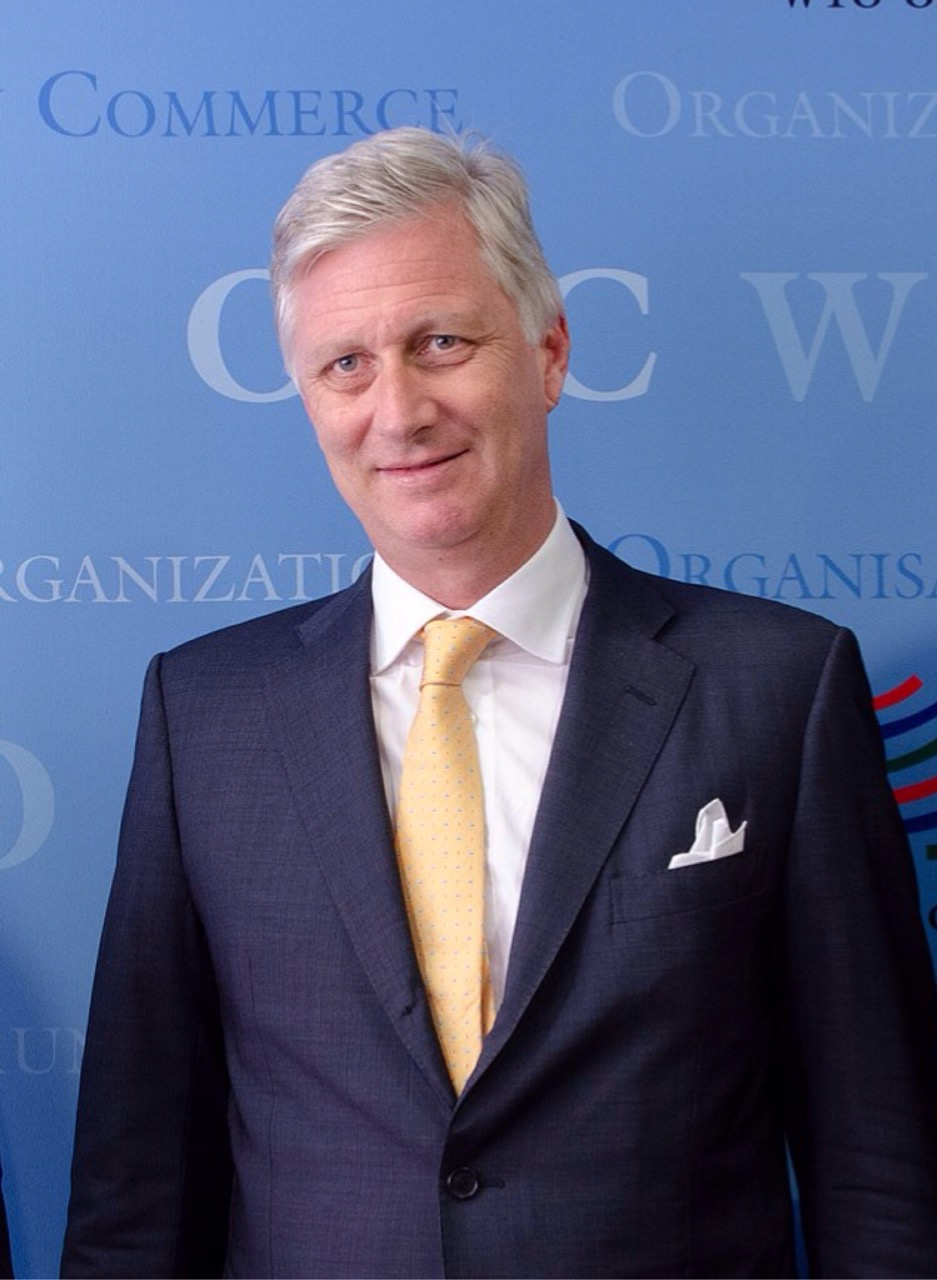
All ministers-president and all federal ministers take the oath before King Philippe.

== Federal government ==
=== Possible coalitions ===
Sorted descending by number of total seats:

Coalition	Coalition parties		Total number of seats	Flemish seats	Francophone seats	Pitfalls
Coalition	Flemish	Francophone	Total number of seats	Flemish seats	Francophone seats	Pitfalls
Tripartite + N-VA / Arizona + PS	N-VA + CD&V + Open Vld + sp.a	PS + MR + cdH	96 / 150	57 / 89	39 / 61	Large political differences in opinion between largest Flemish party (N-VA) and largest Francophone party (PS). Some parties are not needed to get to a majority. PS announced that in would only want to be part of a government including N-VA if maximum one liberal party was present (Open Vld or MR).
Vivaldi	CD&V + Open Vld + sp.a + Groen	PS + MR + Ecolo	87 / 150	42 / 89	45 / 61	Broad coalition which is a minority on Flemish side. One party is not necessary (sp.a or Groen).
Swedish + PS	N-VA + CD&V + Open Vld	PS + MR	81 / 150	48 / 89	33 / 61	PS announced it would not help out the outgoing Swedish coalition and that in would only want to be part of a government including N-VA if maximum one liberal party was present (Open Vld or MR).
Roman-red-yellow + Open Vld	N-VA + CD&V + Open Vld + sp.a	PS + cdH	81 / 150	57 / 89	24 / 61	Large political differences in opinion between largest Flemish party (N-VA) and largest Francophone party (PS). Large Flemish majority but Francophone minority. Liberal family would be split.
Purple-green + cdH	Open Vld + sp.a + Groen	PS + MR + Ecolo + cdH	80 / 150	30 / 89	50 / 61	Large Francophone majority but Flemish minority.
Olive branch + MR	CD&V + sp.a + Groen	PS + MR + Ecolo + cdH	80 / 150	30 / 89	50 / 61	Large Francophone majority but Flemish minority. Liberal family would be split. CD&V indicated willingness only to form a government with majority in Flanders which would not be the case.
Purple-yellow	N-VA + Open Vld + sp.a	PS + MR	78 / 150	45 / 89	33 / 61	Large political differences in opinion between largest Flemish party (N-VA) and largest Francophone party (PS). Some parties are not needed to get to a majority. PS announced that in would only want to be part of a government including N-VA if maximum one liberal party was present (Open Vld or MR).
Red Devils	N-VA + CD&V + sp.a	PS + MR	78 / 150	45 / 89	33 / 61	Liberal family would be split.
Purple-green + DéFI	Open Vld + sp.a + Groen	PS + MR + Ecolo + Défi	77 / 150	30 / 89	47 / 61	Purple-green being helped out by DéFI. Large Francophone majority but Flemish minority.
Arizona	N-VA + CD&V + Open Vld + sp.a	MR + cdH	76 / 150	57 / 89	19 / 61	Would be the current minority government, extended with sp.a, cdH and N-VA. Francophone minority. Socialist family split. cdH would be part but had announced to be in the opposition. Only one seat to spare.
Classical tripartite	CD&V + Open Vld + sp.a	PS + MR + cdH	71 / 150	33 / 89	39 / 61	Proposed by initiative takers Magnette and Rousseau during the Coronacrisis. Has neither a Federal nor a Flemish majority.

Other coalitions are also mathematically possible, but in practice unlikely. For instance: the cdH had announced in the beginning of the formation it preferred to remain in the opposition, while extremist parties on both sides (left: Workers' Party of Belgium, right: Vlaams Belang) are unlikely to be part of the government due to vetoes by other parties.

=== Prior to the formation period ===
The outgoing federal government was the Michel II Government. King Philippe accepted the resignation of the federal government Michel II on 21 December 2018, already a few months prior to the election date. The reason was the early fall of the Michel I Government over to the Global Compact for Migration.

The new federal government should be supported by a majority of at least 76 of the 150 lawmakers in the Chamber of Representatives.

The governing parties during the previous legislature were punished by the voters, losing a total of 22 seats. The Flemish-nationalist N-VA lost 8 seats, CD&V and MR 6 each and Open Vld lost 2. As a result, a renewed "Swedish coalition" (as in the Michel I government, whose component parties' colours/symbols were yellow (N-VA), blue (liberal, i.e. MR and Open Vld), and a cross (Christianity, i.e. CD&V), which are combined on the Swedish flag, hence the name) was impossible even if it was expanded with cdH, the Francophone counterpart of the CD&V, which had not joined the government in 2014. cdH and the socialist opposition parties PS and sp.a were also on the losing side: cdH and sp.a lost 4 seats each whereas PS lost 3. The big winners of the elections were the extremist left PVDA-PTB, gaining 10 seats, and the extremist right Vlaams Belang, gaining 15 seats. The green parties also gained, Ecolo went up 5, while Groen saw a modest gain of 2 seats.

Analysts saw two possible coalitions: a "purple-yellow" government with N-VA, socialists and liberals; and a "purple-green" government with socialists, liberals and greens, possibly also with CD&V. Both options were however very difficult to realize: purple-yellow had a majority in both language groups, but combined parties with widely diverging political views, most notably between the PS and N-VA. The PS had stated on numerous occasions its preference for a "purple-green" government, while the N-VA only accepted governing with the PS if far-reaching institutional reforms (further decentralisation) would be on the programme, which the PS (and all other Francophone parties) opposed. A "purple-green" coalition posed other problems: with only 76 of 150 seats, its majority would be very slim, and it would only represent a minority of the votes expressed in Flanders, with the N-VA and Vlaams Belang in the opposition. The exclusion of Vlaams Belang was consensual for all other parties, however, not only the NV-A itself but also Open Vld and CD&V opposed this solution, and pleaded for the inclusive, "purple-yellow" solution.

The day after the election, King Philippe invited for an audience in turn Prime Minister of Belgium Charles Michel (MR), Senate president Jacques Brotchi (MR), Chamber of Representatives president Siegfried Bracke (N-VA), and party presidents Bart De Wever (N-VA) and Elio Di Rupo (PS). One day later, on 28 May 2019, the King met with Zakia Khattabi and Jean-Marc Nollet (Ecolo), Meyrem Almaci (Groen), Wouter Beke (CD&V), Olivier Maingain (DéFI), Gwendolyn Rutten (Open Vld) and John Crombez (sp.a). On 29 May 2019, Maxime Prévot (cdH), Charles Michel (now as MR president), Tom Van Grieken (Vlaams Belang) and Peter Mertens (PVDA/PTB) were also invited.

This was the first time since the foundation of the far-right Vlaams Blok in 1978, the predecessor of Vlaams Belang, that a Belgian King invited a representative of this party to participate in the government formation negotiations. In 1978 Karel Dillen was invited by Baudouin, but he declined. The party had not been invited to the royal palace since. It was however not the very first time the King invited a representative of an extremist right party: in 1936 Leopold III invited Léon Degrelle after the election victory of his party Rex.

=== Timeline ===
==== Informers Didier Reynders and Johan Vande Lanotte (30 May 2019 – 7 October 2019) ====
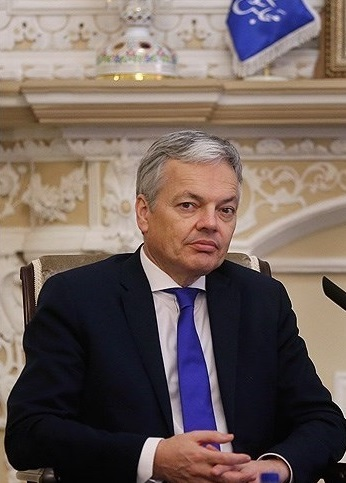
Didier Reynders (MR), informer from 30 May until 7 October 2019.

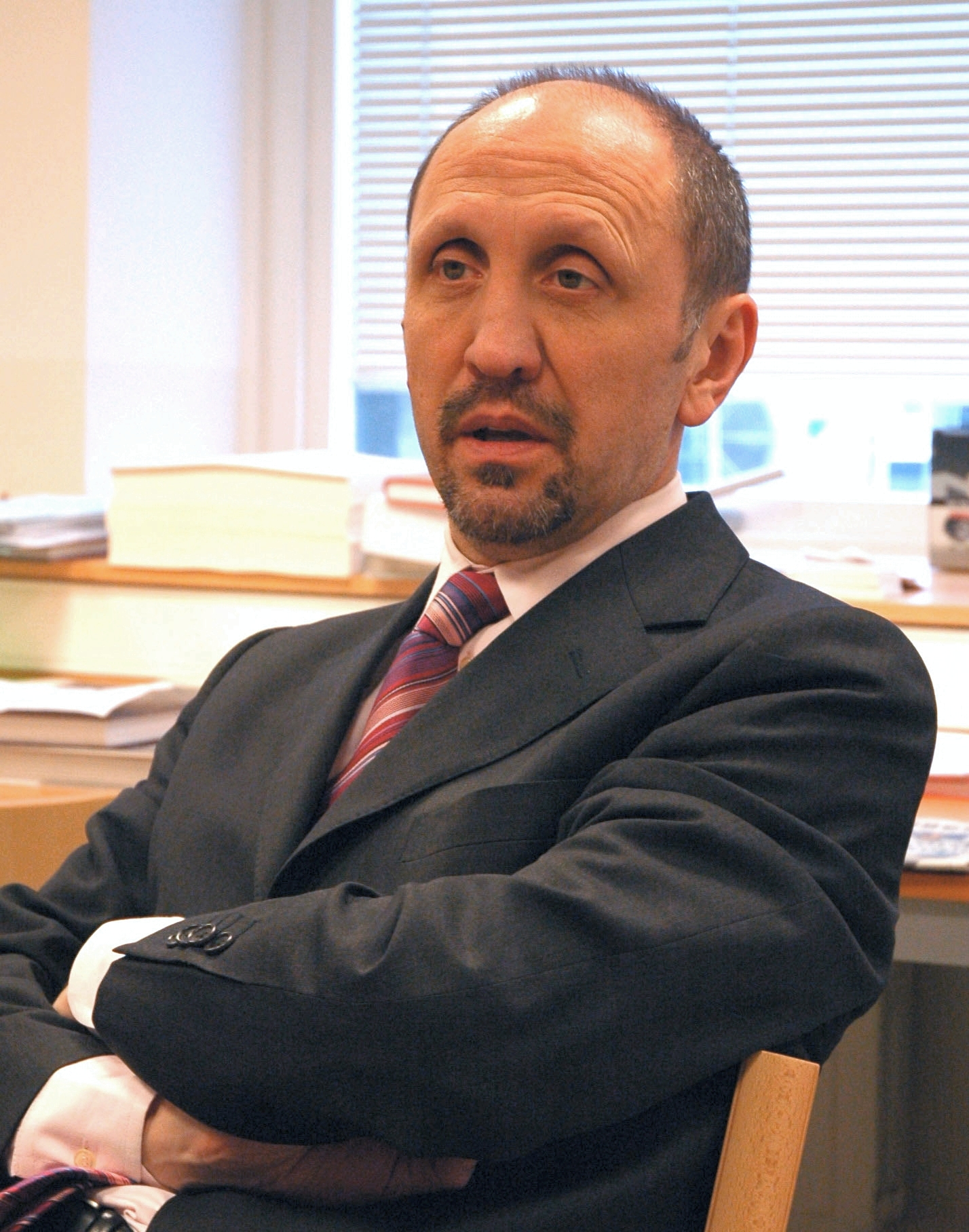
Johan Vande Lanotte (sp.a), informer from 30 May until 7 October 2019.

After all party presidents had attended their audience with the King, he invited on Thursday 30 May resigning deputy prime minister and minister of foreign affairs Didier Reynders (MR) and former minister and minister of state Johan Vande Lanotte (sp.a) together for an audience. The pair was named informers by the King, assigned with the task to identify the challenges for the state of Belgium together with the possibilities and necessary conditions to start the Federal government formation. Reynders and Vande Lanotte were to report by 6 June 2019 for the first time and announced media silence until that date. For Reynders this meant the third assignment as informer; as this had already happened during the 2007–08 and 2010–11 Belgian government formations. For Johan Vande Lanotte it was the first time, although he had already been appointed mediator during the 2010–11 Belgian government formation. with Reynders and Vande Lanotte, King Philippe had chosen for two experienced politicians which were at the end of their national political career and both part of parties which had not won the most recent elections. The duo also consisted of a left (Vande Lanotte) and right (Reynders) politician which were both chosen from a language area where the opposing political side was dominant.

On 6 June 2019, King Philippe extended the mandate of Vande Lanotte and Reynders on their request until 17 June 2019. After their audience with the King, the informers held pressconference at the Egmont Palace where they announced they had met during the past week with representatives of all political parties with elected members in the Chamber of Representatives, with the exception of the radical parties Vlaams Belang and PVDA/PTB. Moreover, they had held meetings with representatives of the Workers' Unions, employers' organisations, the National Bank of Belgium, the network against poverty, as well as several Federal service organisations. They also saw climate expert Jean-Pascal van Ypersele. In the coming days they would also meet with the Federal Planning Bureau and poverty organisations.

On 17 June 2019 the mandate of the informers was extended for a second time, now until Monday 1 July 2019. On 1 July 2019, King Philippe again received the informers. He tasked them with constructing a preformation document, which would need to serve as a starting note for the preformationdiscussions. The informers presented an intermediate status report to the King on 12 July 2019 and on 29 July the document needed to be final.

On Sunday 28 July 2019, a round table discussion took place between the informers and the presidents of the socialists, liberals, CD&V, N-VA and Groen at the Egmont Palace in Brussels. The party presidents of Ecolo were also invited but refused as they deemed it impossible to for a coalition with N-VA. As a result, Ecolo was not invited to take part in further discussions. At the meeting, the informers presented their document to the party presidents. The next day, they reported back to King Philippe. He extended their assignment until 9 September 2019, with an intermediate report due on 17 August. On 28 August a second meeting was held at the Egmont Palace with the informers and representatives of the seven parties present at the first round table meeting.

on 9 September a further prolonging of the assignment was made until the beginning of October, together with the announcement that Groen would no longer be involved in further discussions. On 7 October 2019 the mandate of Vande Lanotte and Reynders ended. In the meantime, Jean-Marc Nollet and Rajae Maouane were elected on 15 September to co-presidents of Ecolo, with Maouane succeeding Zakia Khattabi.

==== Preformationists Geert Bourgeois and Rudy Demotte (8 October 2019 – 5 November 2019) ====
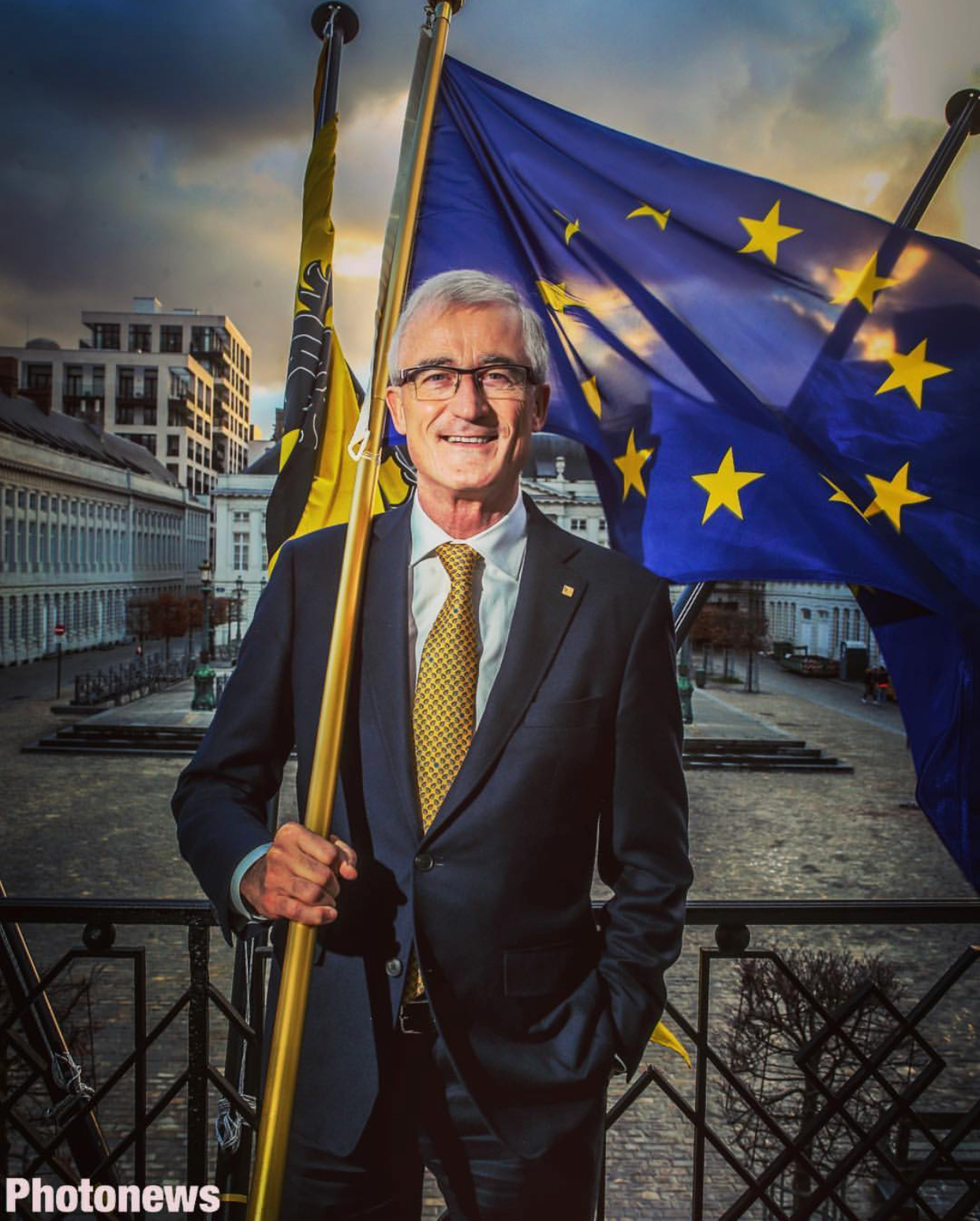
Geert Bourgeois (N-VA), preformationist from 8 October until 5 November 2019.

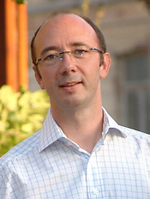
Rudy Demotte (PS), preformationist from 8 October until 5 November 2019.

On 8 October 2019, King Philippe appointed two preformationists, one from each of the largest parties on each side of the language border: Geert Bourgeois (N-VA) and Rudy Demotte (PS). Both were former minister-president. They were tasked to "find a base" for a coalition with the remaining six parties after the task of informers Reynders and Vande Lanotte had ended. Besides N-VA and PS, these were sp.a, CD&V, Open Vld and MR. Two weeks later, on 22 October, the green parties Groen and Ecolo were again invited in the government formation discussions.

During the assignment period, Charles Michel resigned as prime minister, to prepare for his function as President of the European Council. He was succeeded by Sophie Wilmès. On 19 October 2019, Paul Magnette was elected to PS-president, succeeding Elio Di Rupo.

On 4 November 2019, Bourgeois and Demotte reported back to King Philippe. As they had not succeeded in bringing N-VA and PS closer together, the King held his decision of how to progress under consideration, starting a new consultation round. That same day, party presidents Paul Magnette (PS) and Bart De Wever (N-VA) met with the King for an audience, followed on 5 November by prime Minister Sophie Wilmès (MR), Deputy Prime Minister Koen Geens (CD&V) and party presidents John Crombez (sp.a), Gwendolyn Rutten (Open Vld), Meyrem Almaci (Groen) and the duo Jean-Marc Nollet and Rajae Maouane (Ecolo). After his visit, PS-president Paul Magnette strongly criticized the Flemish nationalist N-VA, stating that the party put very strong community reform demands on the table while being unwilling to listen to the social demands of the socialist parties. He also stressed that other options were possible besides a purple-yellow government.

On 17 December 2019 - during the information round of Joachim Coens and Georges-Louis Bouchez (see below), Demotte shot down the purple-yellow combination entirely based on the final report he had made together with Bourgeois. That report, which also ended up at the press that day, concluded: "The content-wise differences between PS and N-VA are of such magnitude that it is impossible to start a next phase built around these two parties".

==== Informer Paul Magnette (5 November 2019 – 10 December 2019) ====
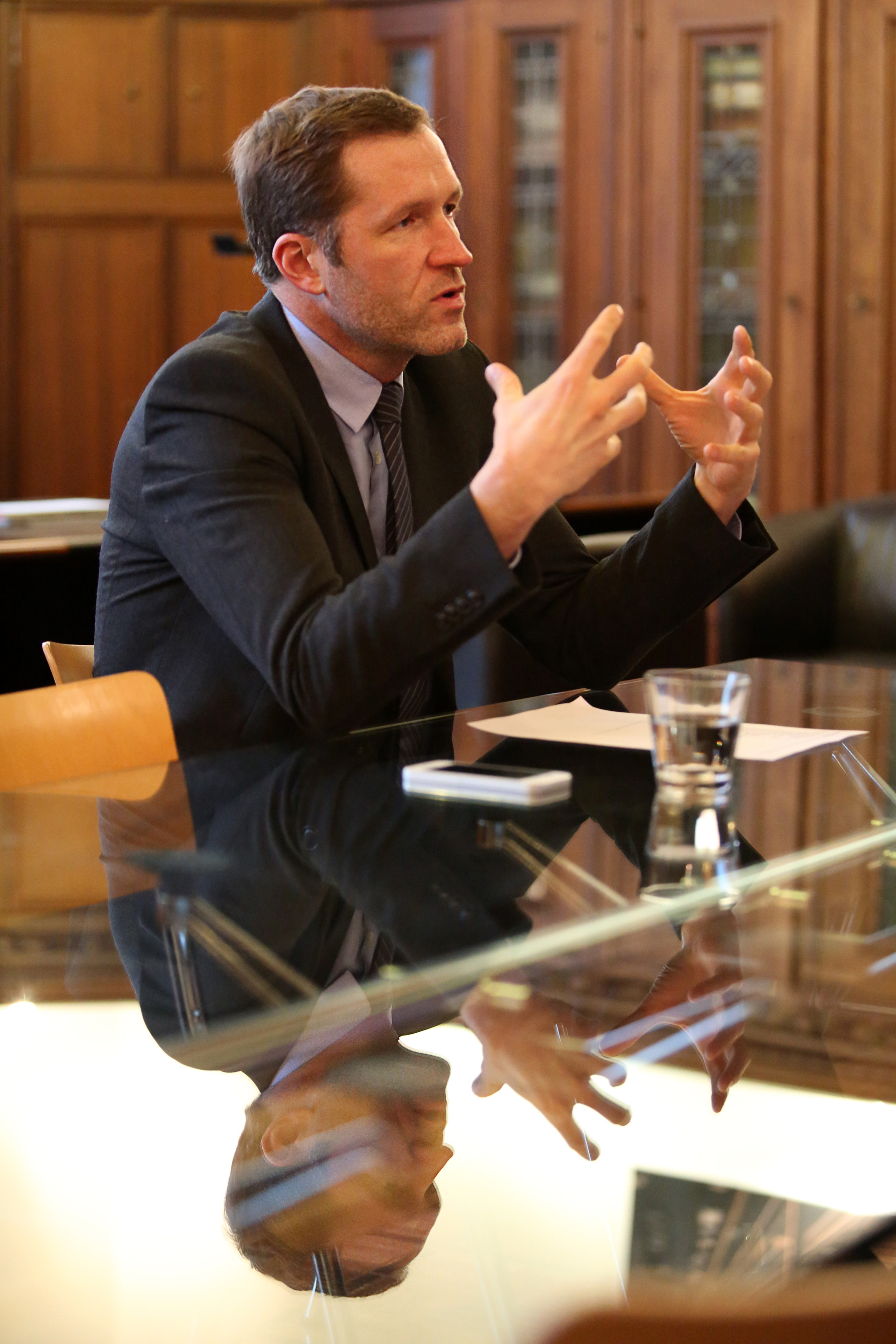
PS-president Paul Magnette was appointed informer on 5 November 2019. On 9 December he returned the assignment to the King.

Following discussions with the party presidents on 4 and 5 November 2019 and his statements in the press, PS-president Paul Magnette was appointed by King Philippe to informer on 5 November 2019. He was to report back on 18 November 2019. During the assignment period of Paul Magnette, no less than four new party presidents were elected: Conner Rousseau was elected president of sp.a on 8 November 2019, succeeding John Crombez, on 29 November Georges-Louis Bouchez succeeded Charles Michel as MR-president, on 1 December François De Smet succeeded Olivier Maingain as president of DéFI and finally on 6 December Joachim Coens succeeded Wouter Beke as CD&V-president.

On the same day as his appointment, Magnette met with former informers Johan Vande Lanotte and Didier Reynders, followed by all parties which had been part of the negotiations thus far. Besides the eight parties already at the table (N-VA, PS, sp.a, MR, Open Vld, CD&V, Groen and Ecolo) he also invited cdH and DéFI for talks. CdH had announced shortly after the elections that the chose to be in the opposition, but party president Maxime Prévot stated he was available to make agreements if it would be necessary. Magnette intended to check on which points all parties could agree. On 11 November Magnette provided feedback. He stated that all parties agreed on five central topics: climate, fighting poverty, increasing the employment rate, justice, and safety & migration. He also informed that he would create a content-driven document in which he would use statistics to give an objective view on the state of the country and in which he would formulate the goals of the next government, as the manner in how those goals would need to be achieved. He also intended to meet with European Commissioner Pierre Moscovici, managing the Economic and Financial Affairs portfolio, and his successor Paolo Gentiloni concerning the poor condition of Belgium.

On 18 November 2019 Magnette presented a memo to the King with measures around the six priorities for the next government: improving the employment rate, social cohesion and the fight against poverty, climate transition, justice and safety, migration and modernisation of the state to make the federal state operate more efficiently. The King extended his assignment until 25 November. Magnette continued talks with the ten parties and consulted the civil society, more specifically the unions and employers' organisations, poverty organisations and organisations committed to climate transition.

On 25 November 2019 Magnette reported back to King Phiippe. His assignment was extended again, now until 9 December. On 1 December news surfaced that Magnette had had a secret meeting where only PS, sp.a, MR, Open Vld, Ecolo and Groen were present, with the intention to check the possibility of forming a purple-green government. This resulted in negative comments from N-VA and CD&V, who blamed Magnette of having appointed himself to formationist. On 4 December Magnette held a new meeting with the same six parties to discuss the budgetary part of his notes. The day after, he also invited the Christian Democrat parties CD&V and cdH and on 7 December he also met with a delegation from N-VA.

The attempt of Paul Magnette to start formation discussions with the socialist, liberal and green parties failed. Within Open Vld there was a lot of internal division on such a coalition and on 7 December new MR-president Georges-Louis Bouchez stated that a government containing the six purple-green parties would have a too narrow majority to be able to operate in a stable manner.

On 9 December Magnette presented his final report at the Royal Palace of Brussels, asking to be relieved of his task. The King held his decision again under consideration and started a new consultation round with the political parties. That same day he invited and met with the liberal party presidents Gwendolyn Rutten (Open Vld) and Georges-Louis Bouchez (MR). In the morning of 10 December also presidents Joachim Coens (CD&V), Bart De Wever (N-VA) and Meyrem Almaci (Groen) came to an audience, followed in the afternoon by Jean-Marc Nollet and Rajae Maouane (Ecolo), Maxime Prévot (cdH), François De Smet (DéFI) and Conner Rousseau (sp.a).

==== Informers Joachim Coens and Georges-Louis Bouchez (10 December 2019 – 31 January 2020) ====
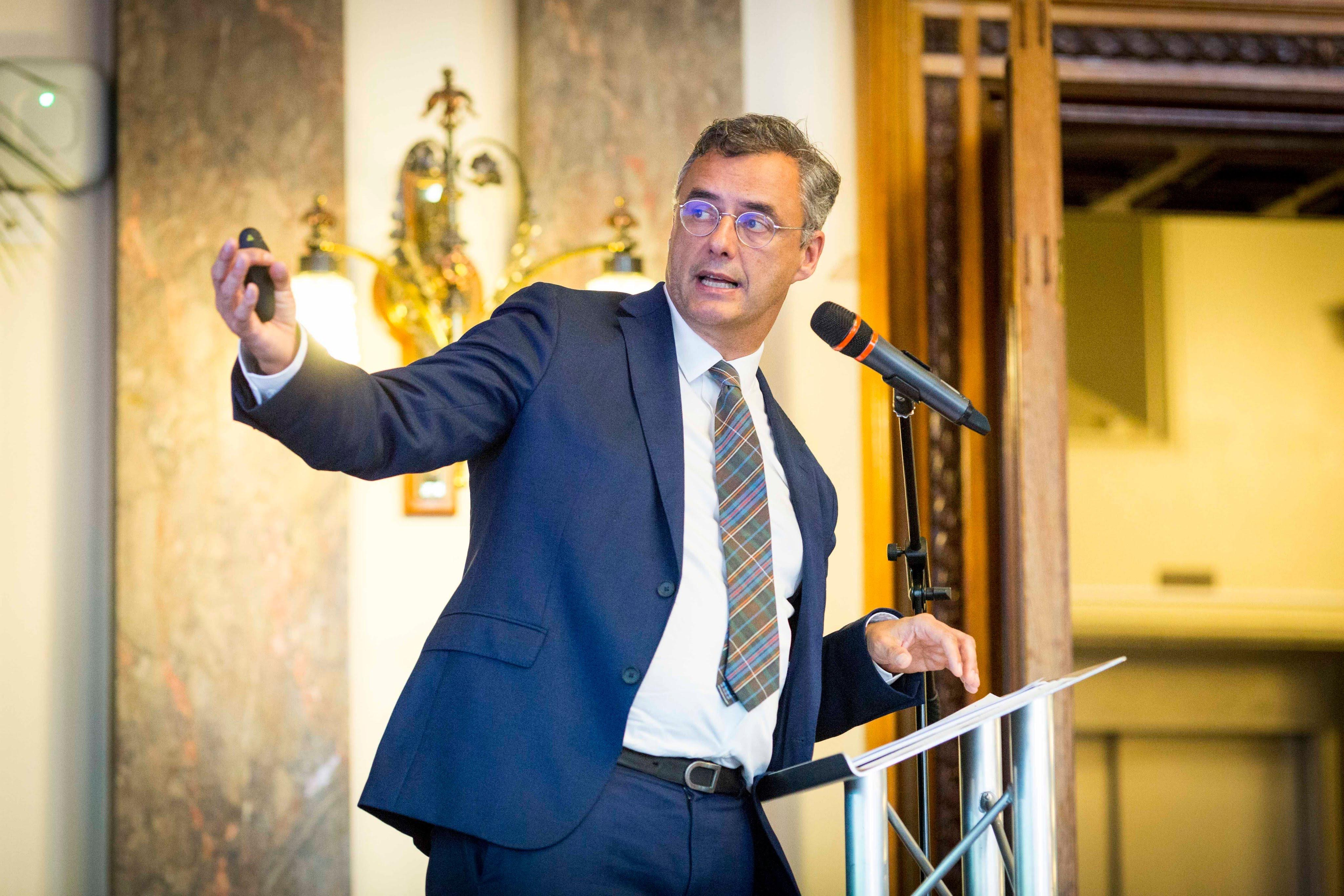
Joachim Coens, elected a few days prior to CD&V-president, informer between 10 December 2019 and 31 January 2020.

Following the consultation round with the party presidents, King Philippe appointed Joachim Coens (CD&V) and Georges-Louis Bouchez (MR) as informers in the evening of 10 December 2019. Both had only been appointed a few days before to president of their respective parties and were tasked to investivate all possible further paths. They were asked to report back on 20 December 2019. In a pressconference the informers announced they would base themselves on the reports by their predecessors Johan Vande Lanotte, Didier Reynders, Geert Bourgeois, Rudy Demotte and Paul Magnette, and that they would invite all ten involved parties in order from largest to smallest.

On 20 December, the duo reported their intermediate report to the King, who extended their assignment until 13 January 2020. In the following pressconference they stated to have had discussions with all parties, both individually as in groups of two or more parties. Their conclusion was that the two investigated possible coalitions, purple-yellow and purple-green, were not viable yet and hence they would also explore other possible coalitions. Based around five themes – the budgetary deficit, social policy, employment and the job market, climate, and safety, justice and migration – they intended to check which similarities existed between the ten parties to come to a majority in a pragmatic manner. They also announced to continue meeting with the ten parties and have a short consultation round with the Civil society to work out the details for each of the five themes. On Thursday 26 December Coens and Bouchez met with representatives of the monitorings committee, the national labor council, the economic council, the federal pension service and the federal planning agency. They also had discussions with the social partners, the National Bank of Belgium, the National Institute for Health and Disability Insurance and the foreigners' office. In the week of 6 January they invited the ten parties eligible for the federal government to explain their memo orally.

On 13 January 2020 the informers reported back to the King. As they had made insufficient progress, their assignment was prolonged until 28 January 2020, to further clarify the various points of view and to see whether it would be possible to bring the N-VA and the socialist parties PS and sp.a closer together in opinion. The day before N-VA president Bart De Wever had mentioned during his New Year's speech at the N-VA New Year's reception that his party was in favor of increasing the lowest pensions, which was considered as an opening towards the socialist parties.

On 18 January, Emir Kir was kicked out of the PS, meaning that from that day a purple-green coalition would be one seat short to be forming a majority.

On 20 January Coens and Bouchez presented another intermediate report to the King, after they had held a discrete meeting with N-VA and PS the day before. In the following week, N-VA, PS and sp.a had negotiations with each other, both with and without the two informers. They also set up working groups around specific issues to tackle, including climate, migration, pensions and health care. On 27 January PS-president Paul Magnette stated that the negotiations had not led to anything according to him.

One day later, the informers reported back to the King again. After an audience of nearly four hours, the King unexpectedly decided to prolong the assignment with another week. Initially they received until 4 February to find a government coalition which has a majority overall, but was not required to have a majority in both language groups. On the evening of 31 January 2020 however, both informers were prematurely relieved of their duty. That day, Coens and Bouchez were again invited at the palace where they submitted their final report.

==== Royal assignment holder Koen Geens (31 January 2020 – 14 February 2020) ====
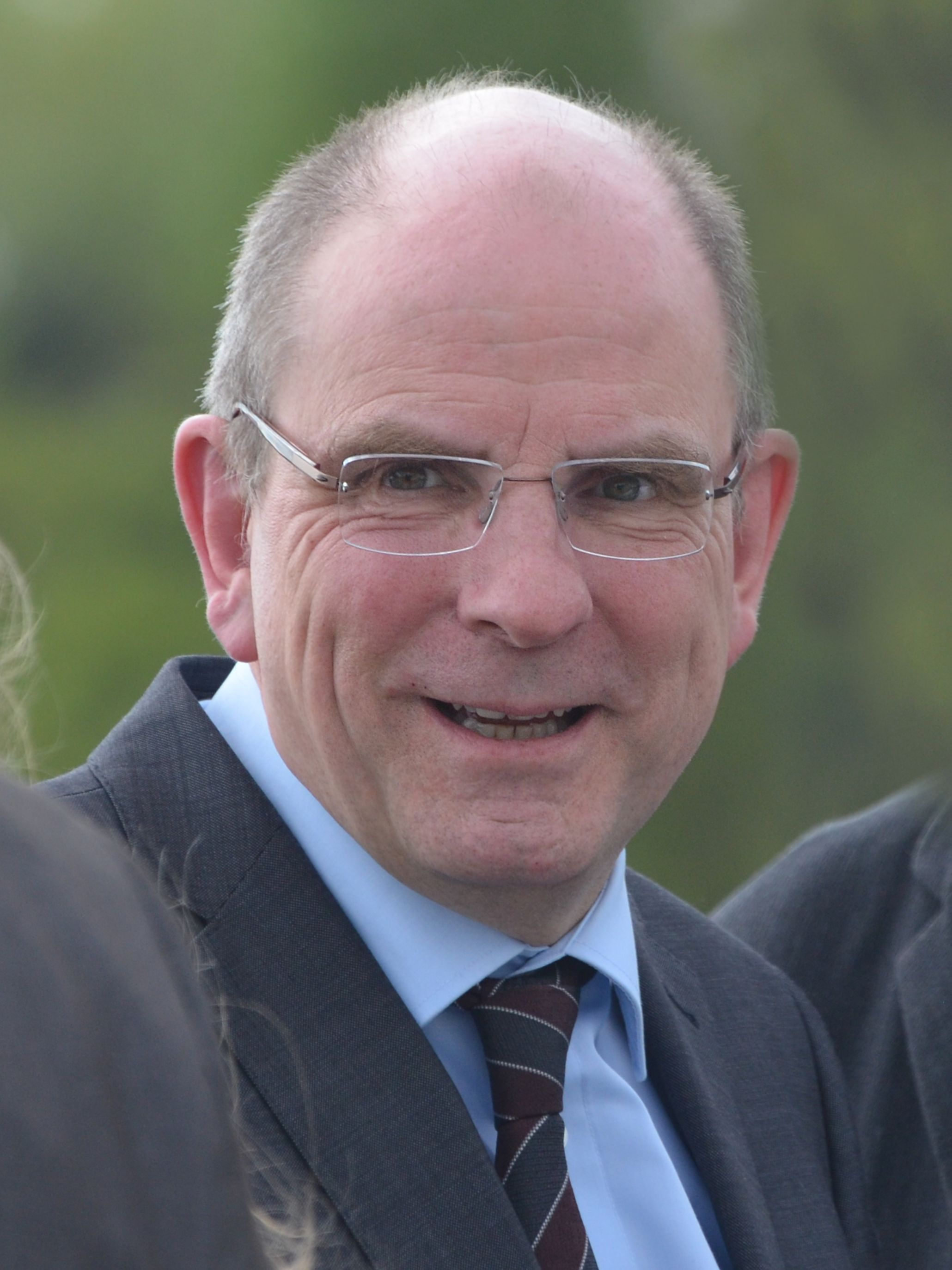
Koen Geens, tasked with a royal assignment on 31 January 2020. On 14 February he handed back his assignment, as negotiations between PS and N-VA had not led to anything.

On the same day as Coens and Bouchez were relieved of their task, the King tasked CD&V-Deputy Prime Minister and Minister of Justice Koen Geens with a new Royal assignment. Geens was not given a formal title for his task and hance was referred to in the press as "Royal assignment holder". The appointment of Geens was a personal initiative by the King, as it had not been discussed beforehand with the party presidents. It hence came as a surprise, as the general expectations was that now N-VA-president Bart De Wever would be given an assignment. Geens was asked to try and form a government starting from the report of the informers. In his opiniong, his assignment was "open", meaning he was planning to meet with all eligible parties.

The Royal assignment holder tried - partly under pressure from his own party - to especially move PS and N-VA into forming a coalition together. On 10 February Geens reported to the King, after which his assignment was extended with a week.

Geens was working on a starting document which contained several socialeconomic elements to start discussion with all concerned parties. Goal was to continue this process until the evening of 16 February, to return to the palace the day after with a more detailed memo. After Paul Magnette had declared on 14 February 2020, via various media sources, that a government including PS and N-VA was in his eyes impossible and that he was unwilling to continue negotiating with N-VA, Koen Geens realized continuing his assignment would be a waste of effort, causing him to return his assignment to the King that same day.

King Philippe accepted Geens' resignation. As the government formation was now completely stuck, the cry for new early federal elections became louder, with media stating that parties were already preparing themselves for an election campaign.

==== Royal assignment holders Sabine Laruelle and Patrick Dewael (19 February 2020 – 16 March 2020) ====
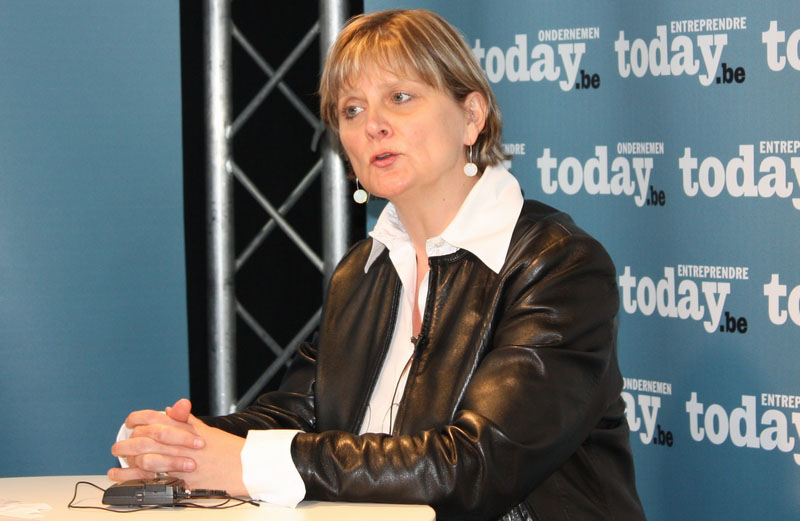
Senate president Sabine Laruelle was tasked on 19 February 2020 together with Chamber of Representatives president Patrick Dewael as Royal assignment holder. On 16 March their assignment ended.

From Monday 17 February, King Philippe started consultations with the presidents of the ten parties still in contention for government participation to discuss on how to progress. On 17 February Maxime Prévot (cdH), Meyrem Almaci (Groen) and Bart De Wever (N-VA) received and audience and on 18 February Conner Rousseau (sp.a), Georges-Louis Bouchez (MR) and the duo Jean-Marc Nollet and Rajae Maouane (Ecolo), followed finally by Paul Magnette (PS), François De Smet (DéFI), Joachim Coens (CD&V) and Gwendolyn Rutten (Open Vld) on 19 February.

After consulting with the party presidents, King Philippe decided to now put two liberals into action: Patrick Dewael (Open Vld) and Sabine Laruelle (MR), respectively presidents of the Chamber of Representatives and the Senate. With that, Laruelle became the first female in Belgian history to receive a Royal assignment. Similarly as for Geens, no official title was bestowed upon them and hence they were referred to as Royal assignment holders. They were expected back on 9 March 2020. One day after receiving their assignment, Dewael and Laruelle sent out a press release in which they announced to be going to work in complete discretion, not communicating on their assignment, proceedings and possible progress, to let rest return in the formation process.

According to unnamed sources from within the government, Dewael and Laruelle tried initially to form an emergency government, which would tackle the most urgent issues, more specifically the budget deficit, which was under threat of increasing further due to the economic impacts following the COVID-19 pandemic in Belgium. This emergency government would consist of the parties of the outgoing Wilmès I Government (MR, CD&V, Open Vld), completed with the socialist and green parties, corresponding to the so-called Vivaldi-coalition. During the weekend of 7 and 8 March the assignment holders were planning to bring all parties around the table to discuss a so-called framework note, describing topics as budget, socio-economic reforms, ethical topics and an agenda for a state reform. This was cancelled however, as not all parties needed for the Vivaldi-coalition were ready to step into such a coalition.

On 7 March, CD&V sent out an online inquiry to its members, asking to give their opinion on the course that CD&V had been taken during the negotiations thus far, namely to stress the need for a majority on the Flemish side, which would only be possible by having N-VA part of the government. On 9 March the results were announced: 63 percent of their members announced were in favor of a government having a Flemish majority. As a result, CD&V remained pushing for a government including N-VA.

That same day, assignment holders Laruelle and Dewael reported back to King Philippe. Their mission was extended until 16 March, to take the necessary initiatives to form a new government as quickly as possible, to tackle the urgent problems with highest priority. On 12 March cdH-president Maxime Prévot and DéFI-president François De Smet sent out a press release in which they stated to be willing to help out a purple-green government in case CD&V would remain fixed on having a Flemish majority. One of both parties would in that case join the government instead of CD&V, with the other voting to abstain during the vote of confidence in parliament.

In the meantime, stricter measures were being taken to curtail the Coronavirus and protect public health. The epidemic threatened to be causing an economic disaster: companies were struggling and stock markets plummeted. As there was still no full government formed to replace the caretaker Wilmès I Government, it became very difficult to take concrete actions to mitigate the impact of the Coronavirus. As a result, the urgency for creating at least an emergency government increased. On 13 March the information leaked that N-VA and PS had met the prior evening to discuss forming an emergency government. The coming together of both parties was explained by the fact that Jan Jambon (N-VA) and Elio Di Rupo (PS), respectively Minister-President of Flanders and Minister-President of Wallonia, were sitting together frequently to discuss possible measures to fight the Coronavirus. One day later, party presidents Bart De Wever (N-VA) and Conner Rousseau (sp.a) jointly declared the need of quickly forming an emergency government. De Wever suggested to have this government exist only for a limited period of time with its main and most important goal to fight the negative consequences of the Coronavirus. The N-VA-president also proposed to lead this government himself; however, PS favored that Sophie Wilmès would remain prime minister, something which was also insisted by Wilmès' party MR. On the evening of 14 March, N-VA, PS, sp.a, MR, Open Vld and CD&V, led by Royal assignment holders Laruelle and Dewael, came together to discuss concretely the planning in forming an emergency government. On 15 March, at 2:00 a.m., the negotiators split without coming to an agreement, but with the intention to continue later that day. Later that morning however, it became apparent that PS and MR were not in favor of an emergency government, stating that replacing the Ministers and changing the composition of the various cabinets at this point in time would take too much time, better spent to fight the Coronavirus directly.

On 15 March, in the afternoon, again negotiations were held between MR, CD&V, Open Vld, N-VA, PS and sp.a. Later that day Groen, Ecolo, cdH and DéFI also joined the group. In the evening, the assignment holders were able to announce that the ten parties had come to an agreement. The Wilmès I Government would ask the Chamber of Representatives for a vote of confidence, which would turn this government into a new temporary minority Wilmès II Government, with support from the opposition. The Wilmès II Government would govern only for a predefined limited amount of time and be in force only to fight the Coronacrisis. To be able to do this, the government received powers of attorney by the parliament, supported by all ten parties.

==== Formateur Sophie Wilmès (16 March 2020 – 17 March 2020) ====
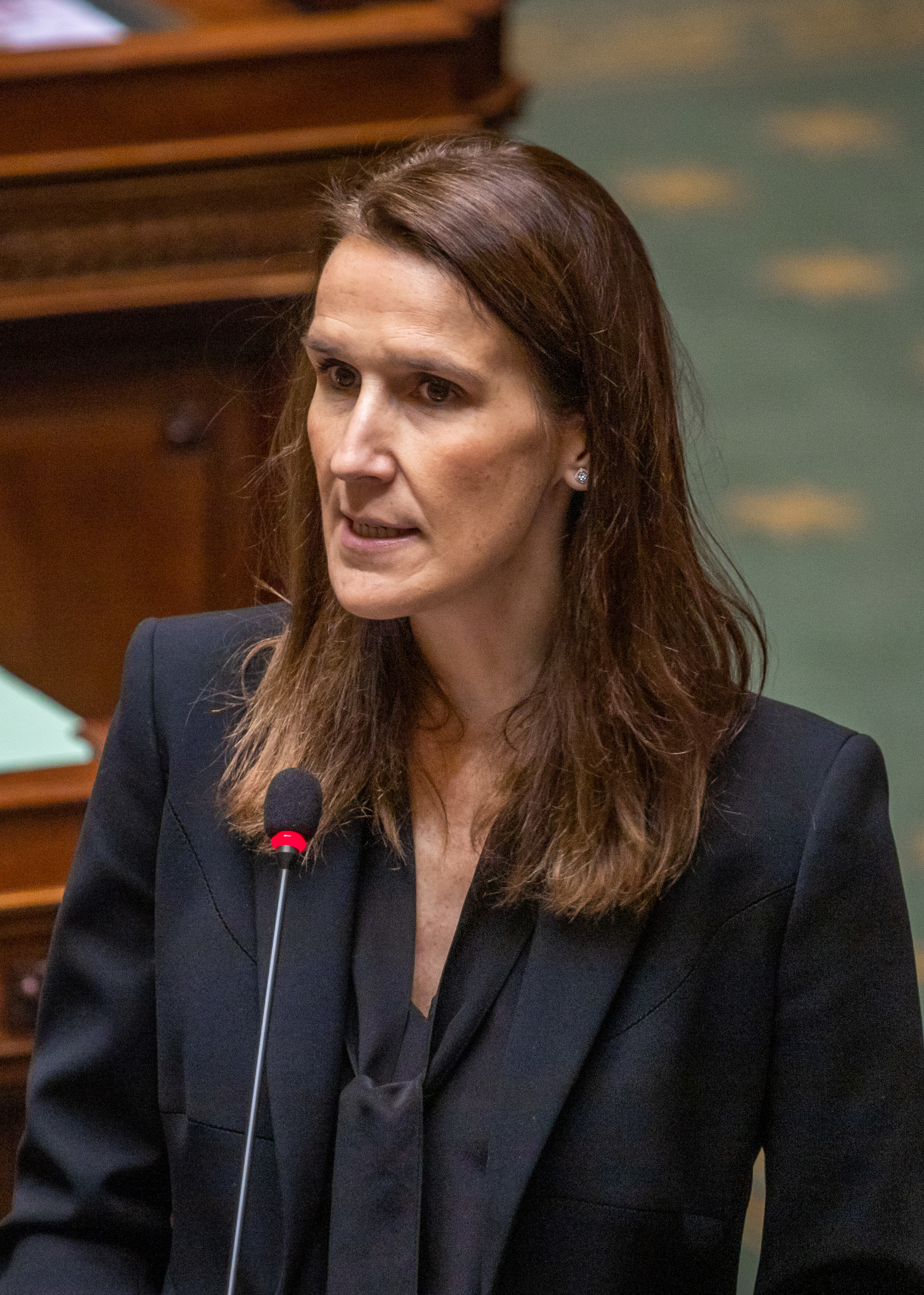
Outgoing Prime Minister Sophie Wilmès was named formateur on 16 March 2020 to replace the current caretaker government with a temporary minority government to combat the negative effects of the Coronacrisis.

On Monday 16 March 2020 King Philippe appointed Prime Minister Sophie Wilmès (MR) to Royal Formateur. Following the political agreement of 15 March, she received the assignment to form a government composed of Open Vld, CD&V and MR. That same day she invited the ten parties to make concrete agreements concerning the powers of attorney. Later that evening it became apparent that N-VA would not be giving the Wilmès II Government a vote of confidence in the parliament, but would agree to give powers of attorney to such a government. On Tuesday 17 March Sophie Wilmès again took the oath as prime minister, asking the confidence to the Chamber of Representatives, to form a government with the same Ministers as the Wilmès I Government. In her opening government statement, she asked the parliament to grant powers of attorney for six months, solely to combat the Coronacrisis. The debate in parliament was held on 19 March 2020 with the vote of confidence happening that same day. As the Wilmès II Government asked for a vote of confidence solely to take Coronameasures and for a period of six months only, concerning all other political issues the government would not have powers to make any other decisions. The parties in the government and those parties giving powers of attorney would be involved in a so-called superkern (supercore) in which all decisions to be taken were discussed beforehand. This supercore consisted of the Prime Minister, the Deputy Prime Ministers and the presidents of the ten political parties supporting the powers of attorney and would meet starting from 21 March 2020 on every Saturday, with exception of the last supercore meeting on 12 June 2020, which occurred on a Friday. N-VA instead decided to nominate Chamber of Representatives fraction leader Peter De Roover. In the meantime, the search for a government with full legislative powers and a full-fledged coalition agreement continued. On 26 March the Chamber of Representatives agreed to grant powers of attorney to the Wilmès II Government, one day later the Senate did the same. Following advice from the Council of State the term for these powers of attorney was reduced to three months, with a further three-month extension possible.

==== Initiative by Paul Magnette and Conner Rousseau (13 May 2020 – 15 June 2020) ====
Only a few weeks after the powers of attorney and supercore had started, it became clear that this manner of operating was not a very workable solution. In April 2020 more and more parties started to doubt the use of the powers of attorney, which resulted in the fact that there was no longer a majority for extending the term in June by a further three months. Nevertheless, the Wilmès II Government would remain with full powers until September to keep combatting the consequences of the Coronacrisis. On 12 June, just before the start of the last supercore meeting, MR-president Georges-Louis Bouchez announced the government would not be asking for a prolonging of the powers of attorney, which meant these were ending on 26 June.

To avoid having the Wilmès II Government drop back into the caretaker status, the socialist party presidents Paul Magnette (PS) and Conner Rousseau (sp.a), as the largest political family in the Chamber of Representatives, took the initiative to have exploratory talks, with the goal of forming a full-fledged new government with a parliamentary majority by September. From 13 May they met with all other party president colleagues, with the exception of those of PVDA-PTB and Vlaams Belang. This initiative is not linked to decision by the Royal Palace, as legally the Wilmès II Government was still operating under full power and hence King Philippe was not allowed to take any initiative to form a new government. Other presidents, such as the newly appointed Open Vld-president Egbert Lachaert, who was elected on 22 May to succeed Gwendolyn Rutten as Open Vld-president, had proposed to have the parties in the minority government (MR, CD&V and Open Vld), possibly together with sp.a, create a central memo to which other parties could join to negotiate a coalition agreement.

On 24 May sp.a-president Conner Rousseau announced that the first round of the exploratory talks was complete. Rousseau and Magnette wrote a report based on their findings following the discussions, after which the organised a second round of talks to present these findings to the other party presidents. On 6 June it became known that the second round of talks was finished. Magnette and Rousseau composed a report of their activities, with the goal of now naming a formateur, who would be tasked with forming a government by September.

On Monday 15 June, the initiative takers handed their report to Prime Minister Sophie Wilmès, after they had given an oral explanation to the ten parties with which they had met. The socialist party presidents concluded that Wilmès was the most appropriate person to continue further discussions on forming a new government. As there were still too many stumbling stones to form a purple-yellow or Vivaldi coalition, Rousseau and Magnette proposed a classical tri-party coalition of socialists (PS and sp.a), liberals (MR and Open Vld) and Christian democrats (CD&V and cdH). This coalition would however not have a majority, as the three political families together only held 71 of 150 seats in the Chamber of Representatives. In this case, extra political partners would need to be found for each specific topic.

Premier Wilmès however was not willing to take the formation discussion into her own hands, as the current progress had been insufficient and Magnette and Rousseau were not able to give sufficient guarantees that her assignment would be successful. She demanded the socialist presidents to further work out their report, but they stated that their report was final and they did not wish to continue their initiative. Various other parties, such as CD&V, Open Vld, Groen, Ecolo and N-VA, were not enthusiastic about the proposition of the socialists and rather favored a stable government with full parliamentary majority.

==== Initiative by Georges-Louis Bouchez, Egbert Lachaert and Joachim Coens (17 June 2020 – 19 July 2020) ====
Flag of the state of Arizona. This refers to the Arizonacoalition, a government that initiative takers Georges-Louis Bouchez, Egbert Lachaert, and Joachim Coens tried to form. The bottom half of the flag, coloring blue, refers to the liberal parties MR and Open Vld, the red and yellow rays in the upper half symbolize respectively sp.a and N-VA, and the orange star represents Christian democrat parties CD&V and cdH.

On 17 June Prime Minister Sophie Wilmès met with Georges-Louis Bouchez (MR), Egbert Lachaert (Open Vld), and Joachim Coens (CD&V), presidents of the three government parties, to discuss the proposition by Conner Rousseau and Paul Magnette. Afterward it became known that these three now took the lead of the formation discussions, starting from the government parties, as Egbert Lachaert had proposed earlier. The three presidents, commonly named 'Three Kings' by the press, declared that a classical triparty was not their preference and they intended foremost to form a stable majority government, which had to set up strong support- and repair policies to combat the consequences of the Coronacrisis. According to MR-president Bouchez a triparty government could only be considered if all other options had been eliminated. The three initiative takers hoped to have a better view on a possible majority coalition by the Belgian National Day of 21 July. In the meantime, the government would, in consultation with the communities, prepare a recovery plan to combat the economic consequences of the Coronacrisis.

According to several sources, the three initiative takers were working in the first place on a coalition without the PS, in which sp.a and cdH would join the Swedish coalition from the previous legislature (N-VA, CD&V, Open Vld and MR). This coalition, named "Arizonacoalitie" in the media (pertaining to the colors on the flag of the U.S. state of Arizona), would have a narrow majority of 76 of 150 seats in the Chamber of Representatives, but would be a minority in the parliamentary commissions, which would be preparing the legislative tasks. Moreover, sp.a would need to drop its political family member PS, and MR and cdH would only represent 19 of 61 Francophone seats, all making this coalition difficult.

On 29 June the initiative takers announced they were working on a substantive note around a recovery plan which would ease the socioeconomic consequences of the Coronacrisis and which would focus on social security, health care, and durability. This note was initially aimed to convince the six parties which would be part of the Arizona coalition to start negotiating about a new government, as these were also the remaining parties that had not called out a veto against each other. Nevertheless, it was not excluded that other parties could still possibly join the negotiations at a later point. Two days later, on 1 July, sp.a-president Rousseau declared willing to talk about an Arizona coalition, on condition that the trio of initiative takers would take into account some important demands from his party in their starting note. To make clear what these demands were exactly, Rousseau handed a note to the trio, in which he demanded (amongst other) strong investments in health care and a fair contribution by wealthy individuals and large multinationals. Before that, N-VA and cdH had as well sent their priorities to the initiative takers.

On Thursday 2 July 2020 the Chamber of Representatives had on the agenda a proposal to further decrease the penalization on abortion, a topic which was very sensitive with government party CD&V. They, as well as cdH, N-VA, and Vlaams Belang were opposed to the proposition. Allegedly, CD&V, MR, and Open Vld had an agreement to send the case back to the qualified commission, despite support for the case by the liberal parties. In the afternoon of 2 July, MR-president Bouchez announced however that he would allow the parliament members of his party to vote freely according to their beliefs. His CD&V colleague Joachim Coens was very displeased about this, stating a breach of trust. Eventually, the case was defined by demanding advice from the Council of State, avoiding a vote. Nevertheless, CD&V held an internal meeting and decided to pause the government formation. According to Coens the confidence between MR and CD&V needed to be regained before the formation could be continued. One day later the initiative takers held a crisis deliberation and the fight between Coens and Bouchez was resolved, after which the trio continued their formation discussions.

On 4 July, the trio conferred with sp.a-president Rousseau to discuss his note of demands, on 6 July the negotiators wanted to set up a meeting with N-VA, sp.a, and cdH to discuss their starting note. Sp.a and cdH refused however to accept the invitation; as they felt more bilateral conversations were necessary, as they had not yet received sufficient guarantees. As a result, the meeting was cancelled and bilateral meetings were held the following days; the same day the negotiators met with N-VA-president Bart De Wever, followed by a meeting on 7 July with cdH-president Maxime Prévot and on 9 July with sp.a-president Conner Rousseau.

On Tuesday 14 July PS-president Paul Magnette announced he was again prepared to negotiate with N-VA, and that he no longer excluded talks on a new state reform. The three negotiators reacted cautiously optimistic to Magnette's statement, but declared they would not restart the negotiations from scratch. They intended to confer with the six parties in the Arizona-coalition to discuss their starting note, and if it led to something, possibly involve the PS as well in the government formation discussions. On 16 July a meeting took place with the technicians or so-called sherpa's of MR, Open Vld, CD&V, cdH, N-VA, and sp.a. This did not lead to much; both N-VA as sp.a had several remarks and were of the opinion the note of the three negotiators did not meet their needs sufficiently. Bouchez, Coens and Lachaert then asked those parties to write a text in which they proposed what should be changed in their starting note. On 17 July another meeting between the sherpa's would take place, but was cancelled at last instance as N-VA and sp.a had not proposed any concrete changes. In the meantime news leaked that those parties had also been having discrete discussions with the PS about the possible formation of a purple-yellow government. As a result of this, the three initiative takers decided on 19 July to stop their attempts, according to them it was of nu further use to talk about an Arizona coalition until there was more clarity about the viability of a purple-yellow government.

==== Preformationists Bart De Wever and Paul Magnette (20 July 2020 – 18 August 2020) ====
Following the probing conversations between N-VA and PS, and after a consultation by telephone of the Palace with all parties that had been involved in the discussions after the elections, party presidents Bart De Wever (N-VA) and Paul Magnette (PS) received an audience on 20 July 2020 by King Philippe.

Both parties had indicated they were willing to sit together and hence De Wever and Magnette received the assignment by the Palace to take the necessary initiatives to form a majority government. As they had to prepare the formation of a government, they were called "preformationists" by the media (while officially, with still a government in place, the Palace is not entitled to hand out this title). On 31 July Magnette and De Wever were expected to report back to the King. De Wever and Magnette tried to find consensus amongst the parties with which they were negotiating on three specific topics: institutional reforms, the socio-economic policy, and safety and migration.

On 28 July De Wever and Magnette invited the presidents of the liberal (MR and Open Vld) and Christian democrat (CD&V and cdH) parties to orally elaborate on their note and confer with these parties on their opinions. On 30 July MR and Open Vld delivered a note to the preformationists with remarks concerning the starting note and a set of content demands from their own. One day late, Magnette and De Wever again went to King Philippe, who extended their assignment until 8 August, with the request to bring the party presidents together as soon as possible to find a supporting plane for the creation of a majority government.

That same day it became clear that Magnette and De Wever intended to form a government with the N-VA and the socialist and Christian democrat parties, as well as one liberal party. For the liberal party, they were specifically looking towards Open Vld, as the attitude op MR-president Georges-Louis Bouchez aroused resentment, as according to several parties Bouchez' only intention was to make the negotiations fail such as to keep the Wilmès II Government (containing seven MR ministers) in place. The next day Open Vld held an extensive party meeting, at which was unanimously decided that the socio-economic and institutional content of the starting note of the preformationists had to be adjusted before negotiations could start as well as the fact that the party wanted to remain together with its liberal Francophone colleagues from MR. On 4 August the preformationists set up a meeting with the green parties Ecolo and Groen, to discuss their starting note. The green parties as well were of the opinion that serious changes needed to happen for the starting note to be acceptable for them. They asked De Wever and Magnette to clarify on certain gaps in the note, specifically on climate policy and the institutional content. Thereafter on 6 August a meeting was held between the Reformationists and sp.a, CD&V and cdH, in which they analysed which options remained to them after the discussions with the liberals and the greens. The day after a new meeting with the liberal parties was held, who now stated they were willing to talk about the starting note with the preformationists, on the condition that De Wever and Magnette gave more insights on the specific formula they had in mind. On 8 August the preformationists returned to the King, who again extended their assignment, now until 17 August. King Philippe specifically requested all involved parties to display a sense of responsibility to quickly obtain a coalition agreement. The preformationists continued to have meetings with both the liberal as well as the green parties, with on 12 August an exchange with Groen and Ecolo where they discussed the climate, energy and environmental policies. On 13 August the liberal and green parties sent out a joint press release in which they restated their concerns around the institutional plans of the preformationists, and in which they called on De Wever and Magnette to give clarity on which political family they wanted to start the government negotiations with. The day after, on 14 August, a short meeting took place with the liberal parties, but no progress was made, after which De Wever and Magentte decided to hand in their resignation as preformationists at their audience on 17 August and ask the King to hand over the lead of the formation discussions to the liberal and green parties. The King held his decision under consideration and started consultation with the party presidents of N-VA, PS, sp.a, CD&V, cdH, MR, Open Vld, Ecolo, Groen, and DéFI.

==== Royal assignment holder Egbert Lachaert (18 August 2020 – 4 September 2020) ====
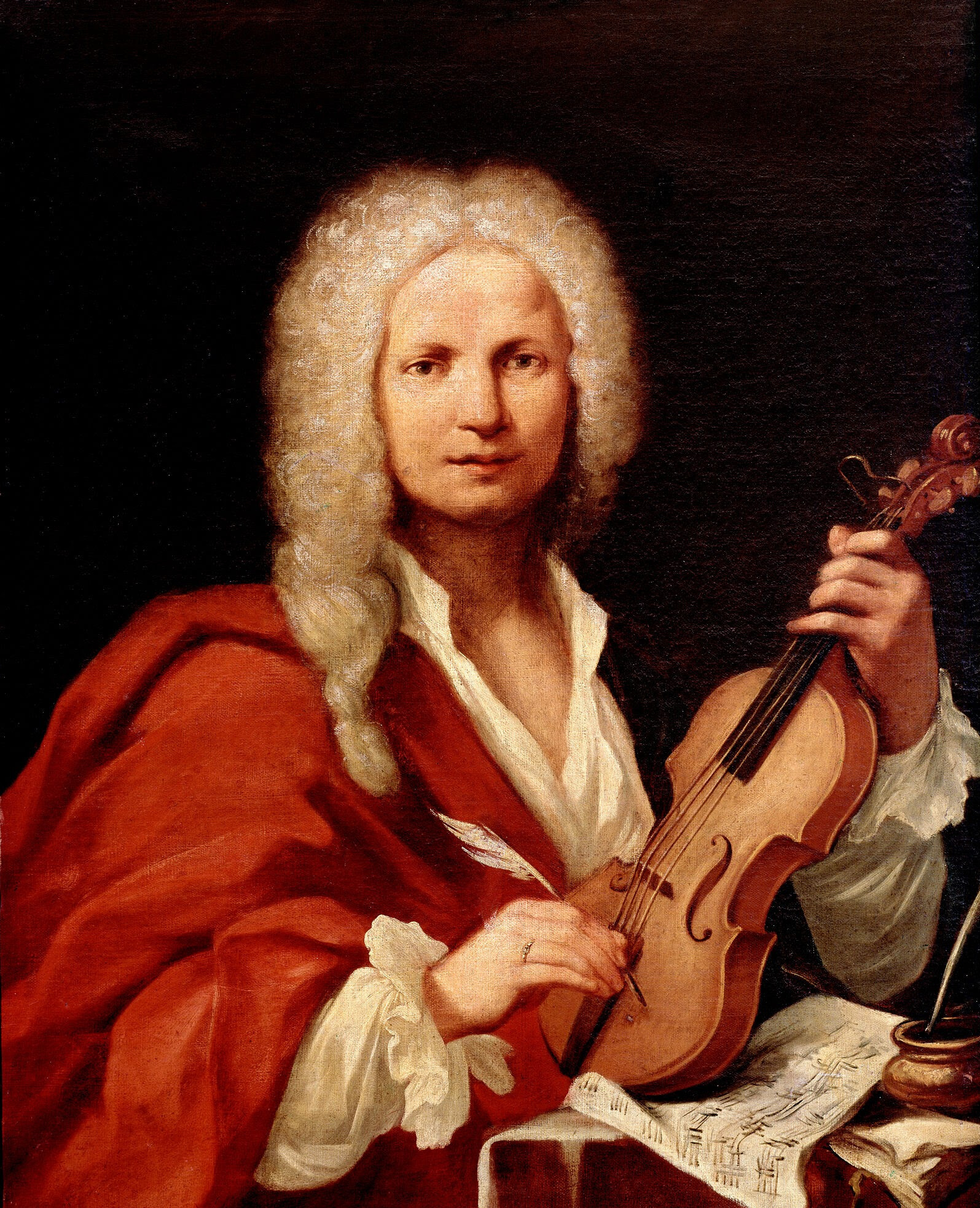
Antonio Vivaldi (1678–1741), composer of The Four Seasons. The possible Vivaldicoalition was named after him, with his work the four seasons referring to the four political tendencies present in the coalition.

After his consultations, King Philippe handed Open Vld-president Egbert Lachaert the assignment of forming a government, simultaneously accepting the resignation of De Wever and Magnette. Just as his predecessors, Lachaert was asked to look for a broad majority coalition in parliament and announced he would be carrying out his task with discretion. On 28 August he was expected back at the Palace to report on progress.

On Wednesday 26 August, in a conversation with N-VA-president Bart De Wever, Lachaert made clear that he intended at first to investigate a Vivaldicoalition of liberals (MR and Open Vld), socialists (PS and sp.a), greens (Ecolo and Groen) and CD&V. Two days prior to that, the Flemish Christian democrats, who had for a long time been insisting for a government with a majority on the Flemish side — only possible when N-VA is part of it — had decided at a party meeting that they were open to discuss such a coalition, on condition some demands of their party were taken into account. These included a thorough state reform shifting authorizations towards the communities and no implementation of any ethical agenda. On 26 and 27 August the assignment holder presented a substantial note to the socialist, green and Christian democrat parties.

The day after, King Philippe extended the assignment of Lachaert to 4 September, as the socialists — whose demands regarding pensions, health care and taxation were difficult for the liberals — and CD&V were not sufficiently convinced to move to a next phase. On Sunday 30 August, Lachaert met with cdH-president Maxime Prévot to discuss his starting note, after which he brought together than evening Open Vld, MR, PS, sp.a, Ecolo, Groen, and CD&V for an informative meeting. On the evening of 31 August the top CD&V party members got together again to discuss the possible participation in a Vivaldi coalition. Still, the party was not fully convinced and requested further clarifications from the Royal assignment holder.

After CD&V-president Joachim Coens had indicated he was willing to give the negotiations for a Vivaldicoalition a chance, a meeting was held in the afternoon of 3 September between eight partiesa: PS, sp.a, Open Vld, MR, Ecolo, Groen, CD&V, and cdH. No breakthrough was made as there were still some discussion points for which no agreement was found, including social security, abortion, taxation and phasing out of the nuclear power plants. The morning of 4 September, the eight parties met again to discuss these remaining points and to possibly assign one or more formationists who would lead the negotiations further.

==== Preformationists Egbert Lachaert and Conner Rousseau (4 September 2020 – 23 September 2020) ====
After the eight parties had found a solution for the remaining discussion points in the morning of 4 September, Lachaert returned his task as Royal assignment holder back to the King. Lachaert declared he would like to continue negotiating with the parties currently involved, with the exception of cdH, which was no longer invited from that point on. As there was no unanimity on who should lead the government, no formationist was appointed yet and instead Lachaert and Rousseau were named preformationists together. In a following press conference, Lachaert declared what would be the most important priorities for the new government: reforming the political system (both institutional reforms as the manner in which politics is being done), reinforcing social security and health care, making the economy and labor market more efficient, an ambitions climate policy, a simple transparent and just taxation, a strong safety policy, an efficient justice system and a credible budget plan. Ultimately by 11 September the preformationists are to report back to the Palace.

On Tuesday 8 September preformationist Lachaert tested positive for the Coronavirus, resulting in all party presidents and technical negotiators involved in the negotiations being placed in quarantine for up to nine days. This meant that until 16 September only digital formation discussions were possible. This made it very unlikely for the negotiators to be able to meet the deadline of 17 September, the date at which Sophie Wilmès would again have to ask for a vote of confidence for her government, as she had promised during her government statement in the Chamber of Representatives on 17 March. Moreover, several negotiating parties stated they would rather decide in a physical meeting who would become formationist. On 10 September the presidents of the negotiating parties agreed that Sophie Wilmès would be allowed to only need to ask for confidence on 1 October, and the following day the assignment of the preformationists was extended via a telephone audience until 21 September. Vlaams Belang responded to the extension by filing a motion of no confidence, hoping to force a vote on the issue before 1 October anyway. N-VA and PVDA-PTB followed suit, filing their own motions of no confidence and accusing the government of breaking its own promise. The parties involved in the negotiations subsequently replied with a motion of order that removed the other motions from the agenda of the Chamber. Upon resuming of the physical negotiations, working groups were created which were focusing on specific topics, such as climate, fiscal reforms, migration, and the preparation of a new state reform by the elections of 2024.

On 20 September the negotiations between the seven parties were abruptly stopped, due to displeasure concerning the attitude of MR-president Georges-Louis Bouchez, who kept challenging agreements which had been made earlier in the working groups, demanded that his party member Sophie Wilmès would remain prime minister and had lashed out heavily at PS-president Paul Magnette in an interview. To recover confidence, the preformationists held separate conversations with each of the parties involved, including Prime Minister Sophie Wilmès in the discussions. All parties separated ways without an agreement, however. The next morning, sp.a decided it no longer wanted to negotiate with MR, as according to them this party was not willing to come to a solution. Open Vld however was still not willing to be separated from MR and wanted to continue under the current constellation, or else Lachaert would return his assignment to the King. Nevertheless, sp.a again joined the meeting that afternoon together with MR, Open Vld, PS, Ecolo, Groen, and CD&V, in an attempt to clear up the problems between the parties. No progress was made, after which the preformationists returned to the King to inform him no consensus had been found on how to continue, and to hand in their resignation. King Philippe however refused to accept their resignation and instead demanded them to continue, giving them until 23 September to restore confidence between the seven parties. That evening Rousseau gave a press conference in which he stated he wanted to continue negotiating, under condition that MR would give a strong internal signal to restore confidence.

On 22 and 23 September the preformationists held further bilateral conversations with the various parties. In the afternoon of 23 September Lachaert and Rousseau came to an agreement concerning some basic guarantees for a new government, with which MR-president Georges-Louis Bouchez could agree. As foreseen, the preformationists reported back to King Philippe with their final report, as their claimed to have restored confidence.

==== Coformationists Alexander De Croo and Paul Magnette (23 September 2020 - 1 October 2020) ====
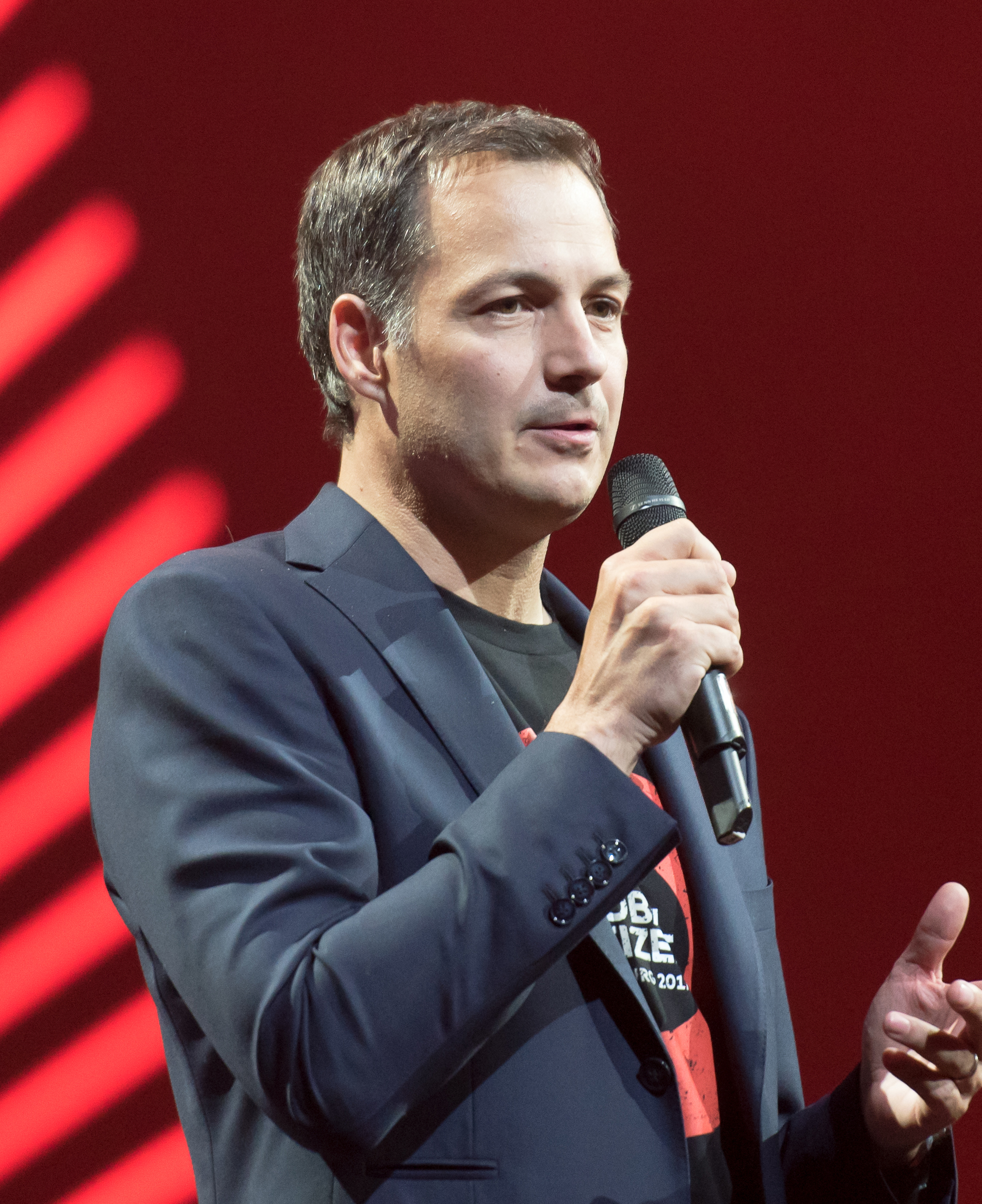
Alexander De Croo became formationist together with Paul Magnette on 23 September 2020.

Rousseau and Lachaert were relieved of their duty after submitting their final report, after which the formation phase was started. King Philippe appointed two coformationists: Alexander De Croo (Open Vld) and Paul Magnette (PS), implicitly making the duo the two prime candidates to become the next prime minister. They were given until 28 September to write a first report, to allow a new government to be created by the due date of 1 October. The choice of King Philippe for Magnette was not approved of by MR, but they were positive towards the choice for De Croo. Some CD&V party members were displeased about the appointment of De Croo.

Nevertheless, the seven parties continued negotiations from 24 September. Firstly the topics of energy, climate, mobility, entrepreneurship, justice, safety, asylum and migration, employment, job market, pensions, a part of taxation, and political renewal were tackled and from Sunday 27 September the budget was treated. On 28 September Magnette and De Croo reported back to King Philippe on the formation progress. As the coalition agreement was not yet complete, King Philippe demanded to submit their final report as soon as possible. That same day and the day after, the negotiators continued working on the budget exercise. On 29 September it was decided that a secretary of state would be appointed who would coordinate the Covid response policy. On 30 September at 6:30 a.m. the negotiators from PS, sp.a, Open Vld, MR, CD&V, Ecolo, and Groen came to a coalition agreement for the formation of a new federal government, with Alexander De Croo being announced as new Prime Minister. The coformationists were received by the palace at noon and informed the king that an agreement had been reached. The parties then spent the afternoon negotiating the distribution of the cabinet positions and associated portfolio's amongst themselves. The coalition agreement was put to a vote and approved by the party congresses of the seven parties that same evening. The next day, 1 October 2020, the new De Croo government was eventually sworn in, with the 15 ministers and 5 state secretaries taking their oath in the presence of king Philippe. De Croo presented his government declaration to the Chamber of Representatives afterwards. Due to the ongoing Covid pandemic, the meeting of the Chamber took place in the larger European parliament building, so that social distancing rules could be respected. The following day, debate in the Chamber continued between government and opposition parties. On 3 October 2020, the new government gained the confidence from the chamber, with 87 of the 148 votes in favor. The independent representative Emir Kir supported the coalition, while opposition parties N-VA, Vlaams Belang and PVDA-PTB voted against the government. Opposition parties CDH and DéFI abstained from the vote.

== Flemish government ==
On 12 August, N-VA released a starting note intended to form the basis of a continued governing coalition of N-VA, CD&V and Open Vld. Jan Jambon will likely become Minister-President. The government was not formed in time for the traditional "September Declaration", when the Minister-President gives a speech to the Flemish Parliament at the start of the parliamentary year.

== Government of the German-speaking Community ==
A few days after the elections, the incumbent coalition of ProDG, SP and PFF agreed to continue governing. Oliver Paasch remained Minister-President. On Monday 17 June 2019, the four ministers took the oath in front of the Parliament of the German-speaking Community and the next day the Minister-President took the oath in front of King Philippe.

== See also ==
- 2019 Belgian federal election
- 2019 Belgian regional elections
