= Stephanie D'Hose =

Belgian politician

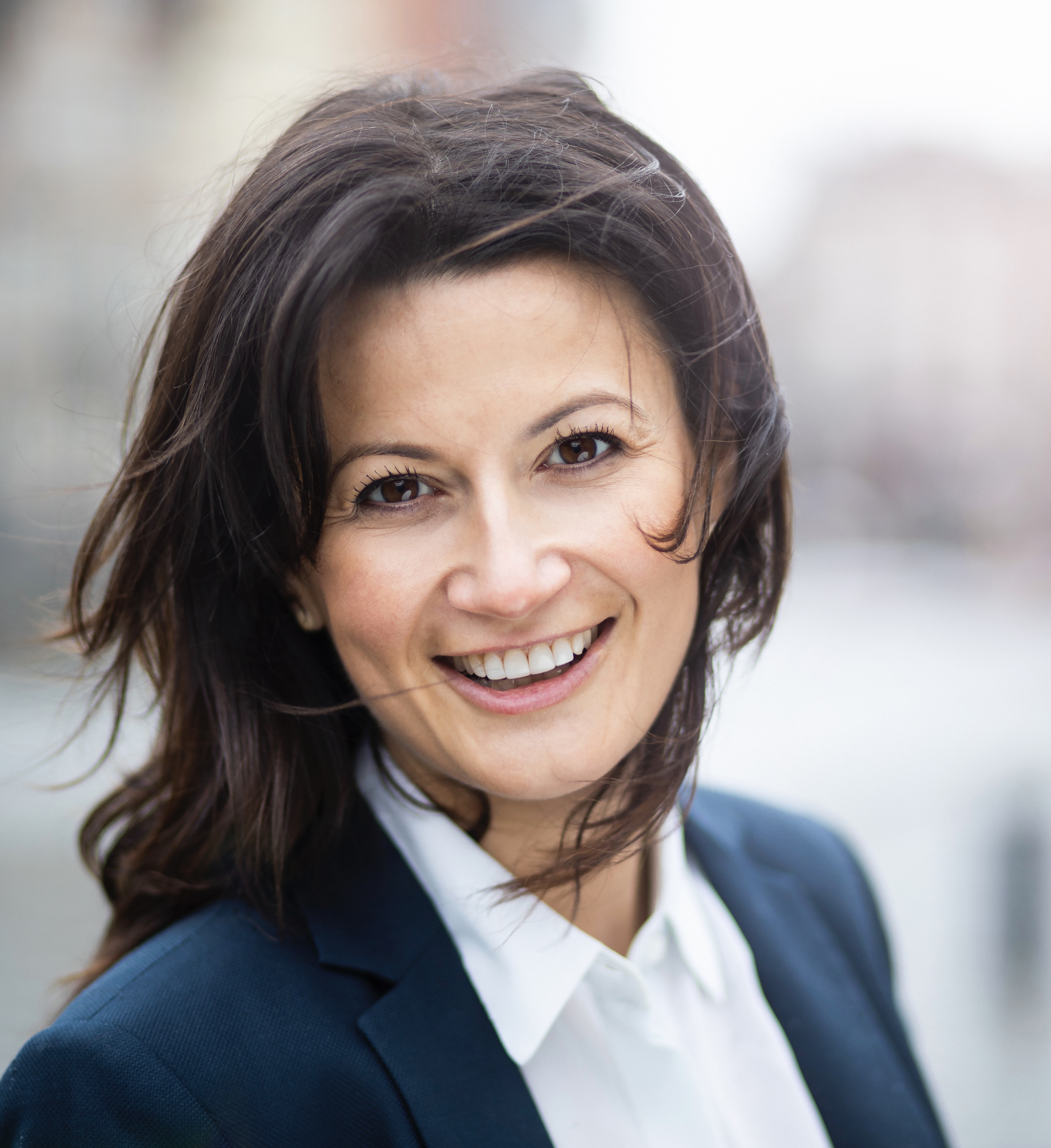
- D'Hose in 2019

President of the Senate of Belgium
- In office 13 October 2020 – 25 July 2024
- Preceded by: Sabine Laruelle
- Succeeded by: Valérie De Bue

Personal details
- Born: 1 June 1981 (age 45) Roeselare, Belgium
- Party: Anders

Stephanie D'Hose (born 1 June 1981) is a Belgian politician for Anders (formerly Open Flemish Liberals and Democrats) who served as President of the Senate from 2020 until 2024.

== Early life and education ==
D'Hose was born in Roeselare on 1 June 1981. Her parents were self employed. She has a licentiate in political science from the University of Ghent.

== Career ==
D'Hose was a parliamentary assistant from 2009–2014 and is Deputy Private Secretary to Sven Gatz.

She has been a City Councillor in Ghent since 2013 and was elected to the Flemish Parliament on 26 May 2019.

D'Hose was appointed to the Belgian Federal Parliament for Open VLD on 4 July 2019, and appointed to the Senate. In the division of powers within the Alexander De Croo government, Open VLD was given the Senate presidency and D'Hose was nominated for the role on 13 October 2020. At 39, she became the youngest person to hold the position. Later that month she became seriously ill with a blood infection and was confined to bed. She tested negative for COVID-19. In January 2022, while she was president of the senate, D'Hose spoke in favour of the abolition of the institution.

== Personal life ==
She lives with her partner Diederik Pauwelijn.

== See also ==
- List of members of the Senate of Belgium, 2019–24

Political offices
| Preceded by Sabine Laruelle | President of the Belgian Senate; 2020–present | Incumbent |
