= Carina Van Cauter =

Belgian politician

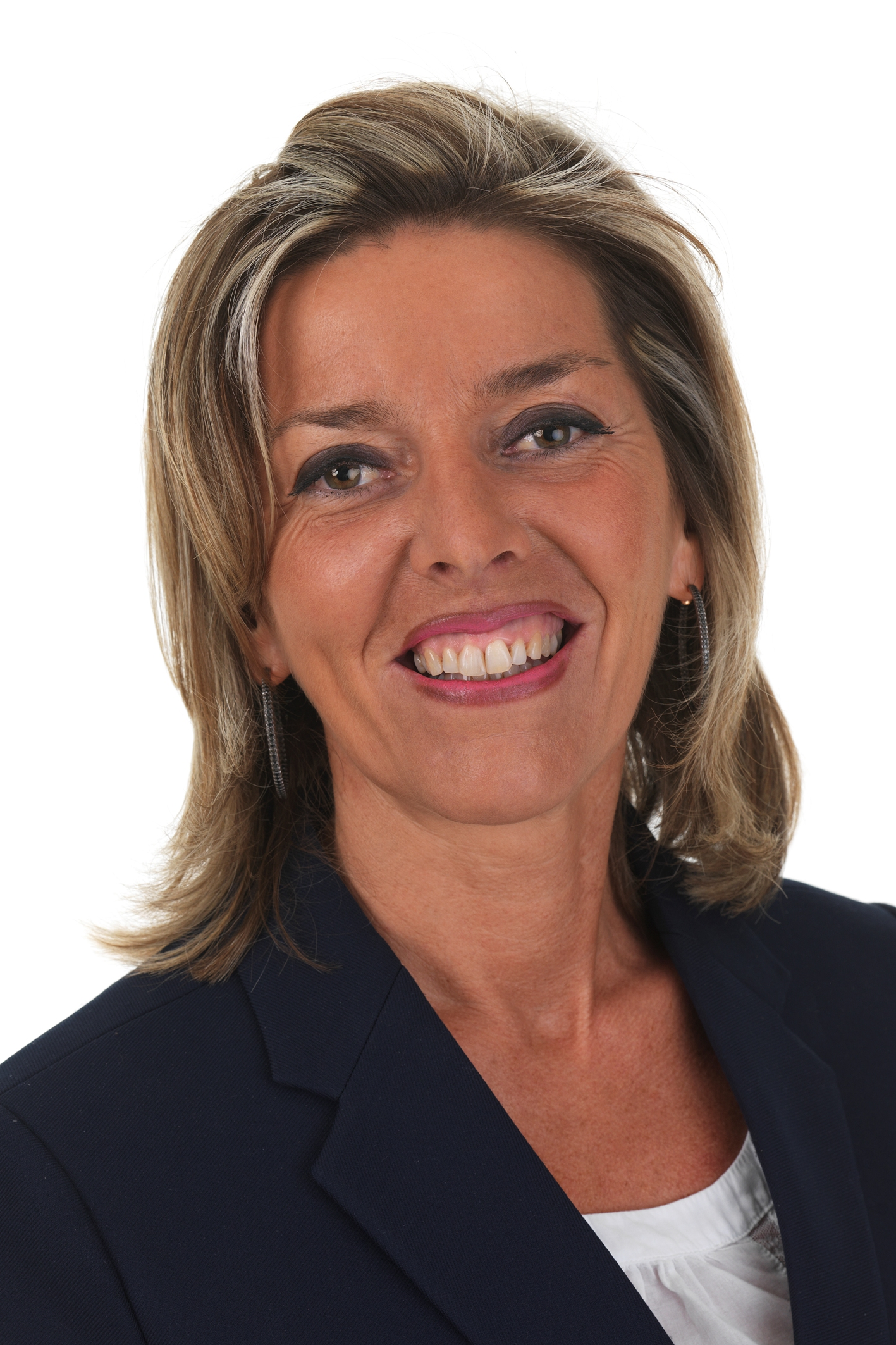
- Carina Van Cauter in 2013

Governor of East Flanders
- Incumbent
- Assumed office 1 September 2020

Member of the Senate of Belgium
- Incumbent
- Assumed office 2007

Personal details
- Born: 27 June 1962 (age 63)
- Party: Open Flemish Liberals and Democrats

Carina EJ Van Tittelboom-Van Cauter (born 27 June 1962) is a Belgian politician from the Open Flemish Liberals and Democrats who has been a member of the Senate of Belgium since 2007. She has been the governor of East Flanders since 1 September 2020.

== See also ==
- List of members of the Senate of Belgium, 2019–24
