= Christine Defraigne =

Belgian politician (born 1962)

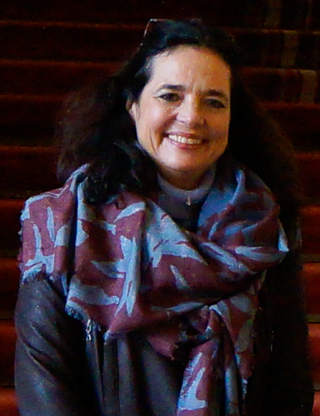
- Defraigne in 2015

President of the Belgian Senate
- In office 14 October 2014 – 3 December 2018
- Preceded by: Sabine de Bethune
- Succeeded by: Jacques Brotchi

Personal details
- Born: 29 April 1962 (age 64) Liège, Belgium
- Party: Reformist Movement
- Parent: Jean Defraigne (father)

Christine Defraigne (French pronunciation: [kʁistin dəfʁɛɲ]; born 1962) is a Belgian politician and a member of the MR. She was the President of the Belgian Senate, in office 2014 to 2018.

== Political views ==
In 2009 Christine Defraigne proposed a nationwide ban of the burqa. She has also called the burkini a "rejection of the freedom of women". Her proposal (together with Joseph Arens) to stop slaughtering animals without anesthesia (like ritual slaughter) resulted in a ban on this practice in Wallonia. She is a feminist.

== Criticism ==
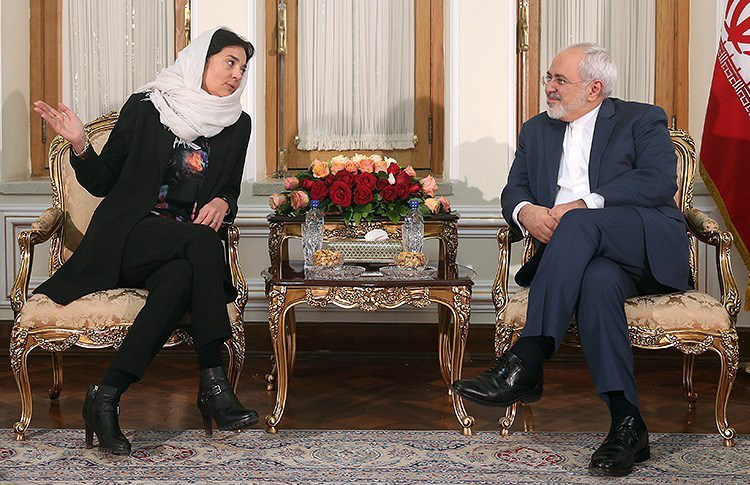
Defraigne in Tehran for a meeting with Iranian Foreign Minister Mohammad Javad Zarif

In 2016 she was criticized for wearing a headscarf while visiting Tehran. Her decision to visit the country and wear a hijab was heavily criticized by Iranian born Belgian activist Darya Safai who accused Defraigne of condoning oppressive policies created by the Iranian government. She defended herself saying she "didn't do anything different from what other western prominent women do".

== Notes ==
Political offices
Preceded by Sabine de Bethune	President of the Belgian Senate; 2014–2018	Succeeded by Jacques Brotchi
