= Danny Pieters =

Belgian politician (born 1956)

President of the Senate of Belgium
- In office 20 July 2010 – 10 October 2011
- Preceded by: Armand De Decker
- Succeeded by: Sabine de Bethune

Personal details
- Born: 13 October 1956 (age 70) Uccle, Belgium
- Party: New Flemish Alliance
- Website: Official website

Danny Pieters (born 13 October 1956) is a Belgian politician and judge.

Pieters was first elected to the Belgian Chamber of Representatives in 1999 as a member of the Volksunie and served until 2003. After the demise of that party he became affiliated to the N-VA. He was elected as a member of the Belgian Senate in 2010. He was the 33rd President of the Belgian Senate from July 2010 until October 2011.

He obtained a doctorate in law in 1985 and is currently a professor of social security law at the KU Leuven.

In 2021 Pieters was appointed as a member of the Constitutional Court of Belgium, on which he served until his mandatory retirement in 2026.

== Notes ==
Political offices
| Preceded by Armand De Decker | President of the Belgian Senate; 2010–2011 | Succeeded by Sabine de Bethune |
