= Emmanuel de Bethune =

Belgian politician (1930–2011)

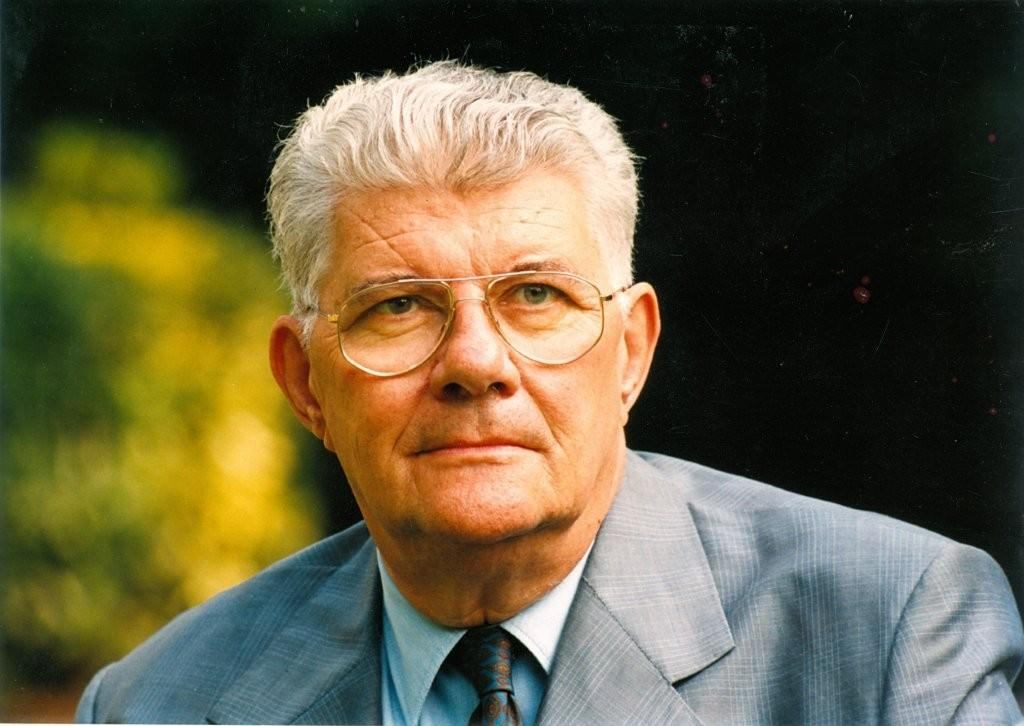

Mayor of Kortrijk

Baron
- In office 1987–1989

Mayor of Kortrijk
- In office 1995–2000

Personal details
- Born: July 18, 1930 Belgium
- Died: November 4, 2011 (aged 81) Belgium
- Children: Sabine de Bethune
- Occupation: Politician
- Known for: Founder of the Bethune Foundation

Baron Emmanuel Pierre Marie Ghislain de Bethune (18 July 1930 – 4 November 2011) was a Belgian politician. He was the Mayor of Kortrijk from 1987 to 1989 and again from 1995 to 2000. He went on to found the Bethune Foundation, a foundation used to preserve the library collections of the Bethune family.

Bethune died on 4 November 2011, aged 81. He is survived by his four children including his daughter, the current Belgian Senate President, Sabine de Bethune.
