= Joachim Coens =

Belgian politician (born 1966)

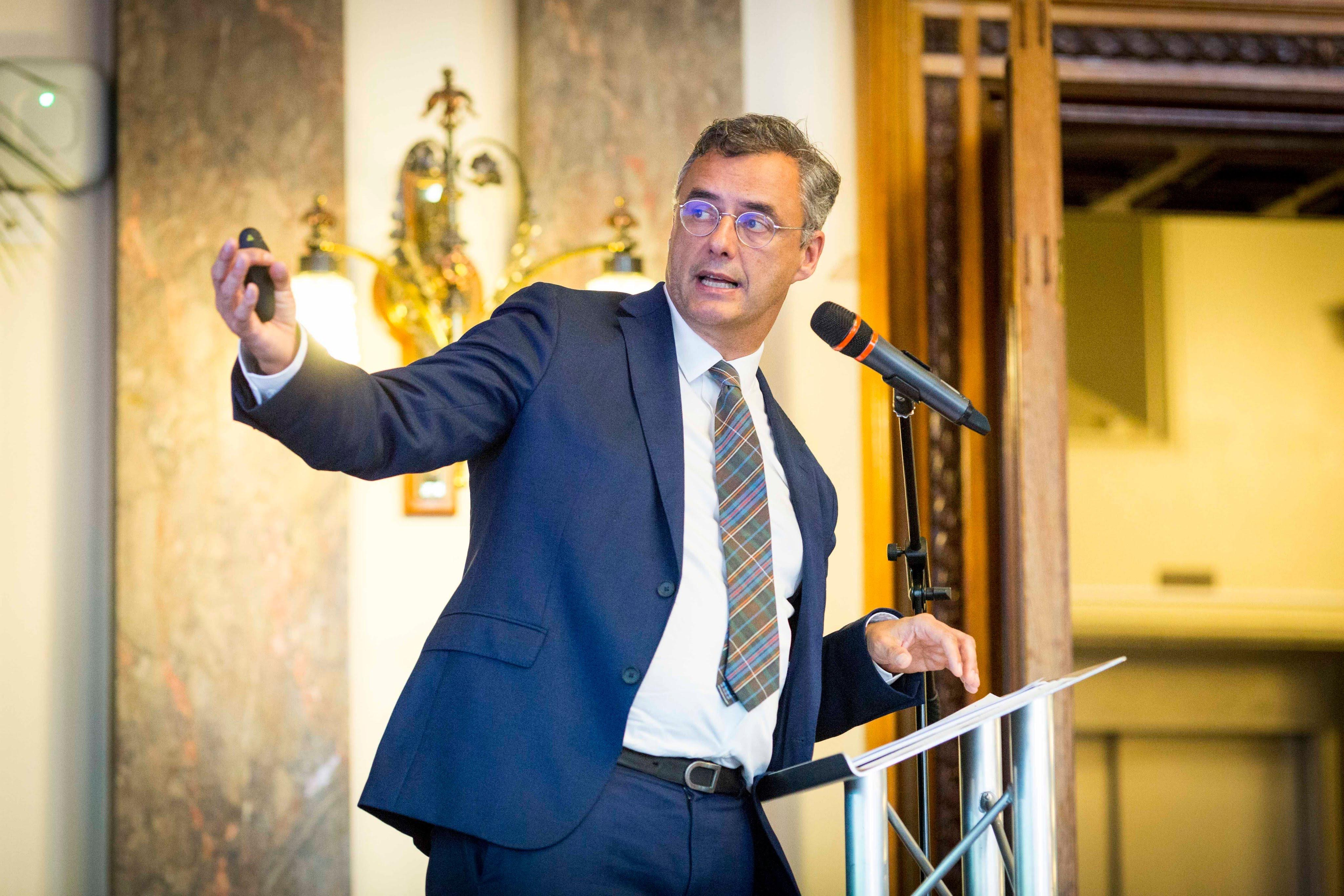
- Joachim Coens in 2019

President of the CD&V
- Incumbent
- Assumed office 6 December 2019
- Preceded by: Cindy Franssen (ad interim); Griet Smaers (ad interim)

Mayor of Damme
- Incumbent
- Assumed office 3 June 2014
- Preceded by: Dirk Bisschop

Personal details
- Born: 6 September 1966 (age 59) Bruges, Belgium
- Party: Christen-Democratisch en Vlaams
- Education: Catholic University Louvain; Delft University of Technology

Joachim Coens (born 6 September 1966) is a Belgian politician and businessman who has served as the leader of Christen-Democratisch en Vlaams, a Christian democratic political party, since December 2019. Before politics, he had been managing director of the holding company for the Port de Bruges-Zeebruges.

== Biography ==
Coens was born in Bruges on 6 September 1966, the son of politician Daniël Coens, who served as a cabinet minister both in Flanders and nationally. Coens studied at the Catholic University of Leuven and Delft University of Technology in the Netherlands and became a civil engineer. From 1990 to 1995, he was an engineer at BESIX and worked on projects in the Middle East and Eastern Europe.

In 1995, Coens ran in the regional elections for the Flemish Parliament in the constituency of Bruges. He was elected, and was re-elected, in the 1999 Belgian regional elections. He resigned his post in March 2001 to become president and director general of the Maatschappij van de Brugse Zeevaartinrichtingen, the company that oversees the Port de Bruges-Zeebruges. He was replaced in the Flemish Parliament by Boudewijn Laloo.

From 1995 to 2014, Coens also served as the échevin of the town of Damme, notably in charge of culture, heritage, libraries, urban development, the local economy, budget, finance and sport portfolios. After the accidental death of mayor Dirk Bisschop in May 2014, Coens became interim mayor while also serving as échevin. On 3 June 2014 he was officially named mayor by a majority of the council. In the 2018 Belgian local elections, he ran under the CD&V list and received an absolute majority.

On 20 October 2019 he announced his candidacy for leadership of CD&V. He faced six other candidates in the first round of leadership elections on 18 November 2019, and ended up with 26% of the vote. He qualified for the second round of elections, where he faced Sammy Mahdi, leader of the youth wing of the party JONGCD&V. He was elected leader on 6 December 2019 with 53.12% of the vote. Upon his election, he resigned his post at the Port of Zeebruges.

After his election, he was named coalition informateur on 10 December 2019 by King Philippe, working in collaboration with the leader of Mouvement réformateur Georges-Louis Bouchez in an attempt to form a Federal government after the 2019 Belgian federal election. The two replace Paul Magnette of the Parti socialiste. Their term as informateur ended on 31 January 2020 without a coalition being formed.

== Personal life ==
Coens is married to Kristin Dewever, a lawyer.
