= Jacques Brotchi =

Belgian politician and professor of neurosurgery

President of the Belgian Senate
- In office 14 December 2018 – 23 May 2019
- Preceded by: Christine Defraigne
- Succeeded by: Sabine Laruelle

Personal details
- Born: 11 August 1942 (age 83) Liège, Belgium
- Party: Reformist Movement

Jacques, Baron Brotchi (French pronunciation: [ʒak bʁɔtʃi]; born 1942) is a Belgian professor of neurosurgery and a politician from the MR. He was elected as a member of the Belgian Senate in 2004. From December 2018 to May 2019, he was President of the Senate of Belgium.

== Biography ==
Jacques Brotchi was born in Liège. His parents Isac and Haia came from Bessarabia and met each other in 1930 at the University of Liège, where they were studying dentistry. They were married in 1936. As a Jewish family, they escaped deportation to the concentration camps by being hidden by a Belgian family in Comblain-au-Pont. After the war, Jacques grew up in Esneux where his parents were dentists. He studied at the Atheneum in Liège. In 1964, he met his future wife Rachel on a holiday in Switzerland.

He graduated as a Doctor of Medicine from the University of Liège in 1967. His chief interest was neurosurgery, which led him to work (already as a student) at the Laboratory for Neuroanatomy and at the Neurosurgical Clinic of the university. He received his PhD for his study of the histochemistry of focal epilepsies.

In 1982, he became a professor at the Université libre de Bruxelles and created the Department of Neurosurgery of Erasmus Hospital. In 1998, this department was nominated as the "First worldwide WHO Collaborating Centre for Research and Training in Neurosurgery" by the WHO.

From 1989 to 1992, he was the head of the Belgian Society for Neurosurgery. Between 1991 and 1994, he presided over the French Language Society for Neurosurgery. Between 1997 and 2001, he became chairman of the Education Committee of the World Federation of Neurosurgical Societies. Since 2003, he is a member of the board of the Francqui Foundation.

Jacques Brotchi became senator in 2004. In 2005, he joined the scientific committee of the Baillet Latour Prize and became chairman of the World Federation of Neurosurgical Societies.

He is a member of the Belgian Royal Academy of Medicine, the American Academy of Neurological Surgery and of the French Academy of Surgery.

In 2000, he was awarded the Joseph Maisin Prize. In 2008, he was one of the two Mensch of the Year of the Centre Communautaire Laïc Juif de Belgique. In May 2007, he was made a baron by King Albert II of Belgium. In November 2008, he received the Scopus Award from the Hebrew University of Jerusalem.

In 2011, he resigned from the board of the Université libre de Bruxelles in protest against the university's failure to address a series of antisemitic incidents on campus.

In 2019, as punishment for visiting Taiwan he received a lifetime ban from entering China.

== Honours ==
=== Belgian Honours ===
- Chevalier, ennobled by King Baudouin of Belgium (1988)
- Baron, by King Albert II of Belgium (Royal decree, 7 May 2007)
- Commandeur of the Order of Leopold since 8 April 1996
  - promoted Grand Officer of the Order of Leopold on 8 December 2010
- Grand Officer of the Order of the Crown since 15 November 2007.

=== Foreign Honours ===
- Denmark : Knight of the Order of the Dannebrog in 1996.
- France : Knight of the Legion of Honour in 1992
- Spain : Grand Commander (Encomienda de Número) of the Order of Civil Merit in 2004

== Bibliography ==
Apart from over 350 articles, 65 of them listed at PubMed , Brotchi also edited:

- Intramedullary spinal cord tumors, by Georges Fischer, Jacques Brotchi, and D. Baleriaux, Thieme Medical Publishers 1996. ISBN 978-3-13-101871-7

== Notes ==
Political offices
Preceded by Christine Defraigne	President of the Belgian Senate; 2018–2019	Succeeded by Sabine Laruelle
