= Georges-Louis Bouchez =

Belgian politician and lawyer (born 1986)

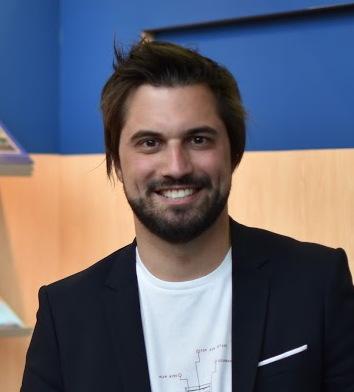
- Bouchez in 2017

President of the Reformist Movement
- Incumbent
- Assumed office 29 November 2019
- Preceded by: Charles Michel

Member of the Chamber of Representatives
- Incumbent
- Assumed office 10 July 2024
- Constituency: Hainaut Province

Member of the Senate
- In office 12 July 2019 – 10 July 2024

Member of the Parliament of Wallonia
- In office 22 October 2014 – 15 April 2016
- Preceded by: Jacqueline Galant
- Succeeded by: Jacqueline Galant

Personal details
- Born: 23 March 1986 (age 40) Frameries, Wallonia, Belgium
- Party: Reformist Movement (MR)
- Domestic partner: Lucie Demaret
- Children: 1
- Education: Université Saint-Louis - Bruxelles; Université libre de Bruxelles
- Occupation: Lawyer • Politician
- Website: https://www.glbouchez.be/

Georges-Louis Bouchez (French pronunciation: [ʒɔʁʒ lwi buʃe]; born 23 March 1986) is a Belgian politician and lawyer. Since 2019 he has served as a Senator and leader of the Reformist Movement, a liberal French-speaking party in Belgium. He is also the owner and chairman of the Challenger Pro League football club Royal Francs Borains.

== Early life ==
Bouchez was born in Frameries on 23 March 1986 to modest, self-employed parents. His grandparents were soldiers and mine workers originally from Italy. He grew up in Colfontaine and Quaregnon, and attended l’École des Cannoniers in Mons from 1992 to 1998 and Collège Saint Stanislas in Mons for his secondary studies, where he graduated in 2004.

Bouchez studied law with a minor in political science at the Université Saint-Louis - Bruxelles from 2004 to 2007 and received his master's in public law from Université libre de Bruxelles two years later. His dissertation, under the guidance of Marc Uyttendaele, was titled Suite à la polémique de l’affaire Fortis : Jusqu’où la nécessité politique peut-elle aller dans la violation des règles de droit ?

== Political career ==
After finishing his graduate studies in 2009, he began to work in the office of Cabinet minister Didier Reynders as an advisor. At the same time, he worked as a legal assistant at the Facultés Universitaires Notre-Dame de la Paix in Namur and later was appointed the law practice officer at UMons.

In December 2011, following the creation of a new government, Bouchez again became an advisor to Reynders, who had been appointed Minister of Foreign Affairs.

=== Local politics ===
At age 20, he ran in his first election, running as a member of the Mouvement Réformateur for local elections in 2006 in the city of Mons. Placed fourth on the party list, he received 397 votes, missing election by a few votes. In the 2010 elections, he was listed 8th on the MR's electoral list for the Senate.

In 2012, Bouchez was chosen by his colleagues in the MR to run at the top of the electoral list for communal elections in Mons. He received 2,550 votes and served as the Échevin for Budget, Finance, Employment and Sustainable Development for the city under Elio Di Rupo's PS-MR coalition.

During the 2014 regional elections Bouchez was listed as a first substitute on the MR list and received 4,535 votes. When Jacqueline Galant became federal minister of mobility, Bouchez became a Member of the Parliament of Wallonia and a member of the Parliament of the French Community of Belgium.

In April 2016, Jacqueline Galant resigned her role in the federal government following several controversies. Because Bouchez was Galant's substitute, he lost his seats in both parliaments following her return. Four days later, as Bouchez was set to return to his role as Échevin, Mons mayor Elio Di Rupo changed his coalition partner from the MR to the cdH, making Bouchez a communal councilor.

In June 2016, Bouchez became more involved in internal party politics. He joined the Centre Jean Gol, a liberal think tank, and worked to organize and brainstorm new policy ideas for the MR. At the Mouvement réformateur's 2016 policy convention, he fought against attempts by Louis Michel to get rid of compulsory voting, advocated for a universal basic income, increased taxation on robots taking peoples jobs, proposed a second round of elections so citizens could choose from possible coalition options, and advocated for the criminalization of those who praise the Nazi occupation of Belgium.

During the 2018 communal elections, rather than run under the Mouvement Reformateur, Bouchez formed a new opposition electoral alliance called « Mons en Mieux ! » (Mons for the Better!). He was joined by members of the cdH (including Opaline Meunier), the PS, Ecolo, and several local members of the FGTB and CSC unions The alliance received 22% of the vote, gaining 11 seats in the local council, with eight of the seats won by people under 35 years old (the most since 1994). Bouchez himself received the third largest number of first preference votes in the city (4,976 votes).

However, the PS and Ecolo decided to form a coalition, shutting Bouchez out of a leadership role locally.

==== Federal politics ====
On 19 March 2019 Charles Michel, leader of the Mouvement Réformateur, named Bouchez as the party's spokesperson during the federal election campaign.

In the 2019 federal elections, Bouchez was placed fourth on the MR electoral list for Hennuyère constituency in Braine-le-Comte, a relatively safe area for the MR electorally. He received 16,522 votes in Hainaut province, the second highest number of first-preference votes. However, he was not elected due to vote transfers within the electoral system. Nevertheless, he became a co-opted Senator for the MR, getting sworn in on 12 July 2019. In the Senate, he worked with his colleagues to increase voting rights for Belgians living abroad in regional elections as well as increasing access to vaccines.

In October 2019, Bouchez was one of five candidates who ran to replace Charles Michel as leader of the Mouvement Réformateur. On 28 November 2019 Bouchez was elected leader of the party, beating rival Denis Ducarme in the second round with 62% of the vote.

On 10 December 2019 Bouchez was appointed Informateur by King Philippe along with Joachim Coens, leader of CD&V, in an attempt to find a workable government coalition following the 2019 federal election. After being unable to find a solution, both men were discharged from their informateur duties on 31 January 2020.

== Criticism and controversy ==
=== Accusations of closeness to the far right ===
On January 8, 2022, Georges-Louis Bouchez declared: "Valérie Pécresse has been a Chiraquienne, a Sarkozyste, a Macroniste, and now she's bringing out the karcher. I have more respect for Zemmour than for Pécresse. I'd rather have someone whose ideas I disagree with, but who at least has consistency in his ideas, than someone who changes his mind all the time according to the poll curve", before adding: "I'd vote for Macron, even though he's disappointed me a lot". This statement was denounced a few days later by Denis Ducarme, who described it as creating deep unease and regretted that the president of his party was "praising the extremist Éric Zemmour". The same is true of the Brussels Ecolo MP Ahmed Mouhssin: "With his outrageous speech questioning Islamophobia and supporting Éric Zemmour, he is polarizing society. This kind of discourse undermines solidarity".

On April 21, 2022, Georges-Louis Bouchez debated the president of the Flemish far-right party Vlaams Belang on VRT's "Ter Zake" program. The debate was intended as a sort of replica of the Macron-Le Pen debate broadcast on French channels the day before the second round of the presidential election. The choice of Georges-Louis Bouchez was immediately criticized as a breach of the media cordon sanitaire against the far right, to which all French-speaking parties in Belgium had subscribed.

According to political scientist Dave Sinardet, its discourse is sometimes similar to that of the N-VA or Vlaams Belang, in that it regularly attacks Vivaldi. This analysis is also shared by the press, as well as its political opponents, who recognize the "extreme-ritization" of the MR's (and its president's) discourse and proposals. A joint analysis by UCLouvain and the University of Antwerp confirms these views.

=== Accused of apology for terrorism ===
On September 24, 2024, during an appearance on Radio Judaïca, he described as a "stroke of genius" the beeper and walkie-talkie explosions in Lebanon on September 17 and 18, attributed to Israel and resulting in the deaths of 42 people and over 3,458 injuries.

I think this attack, on the contrary, is a stroke of genius. It's an extremely intelligent method. From the moment they had the beacons, it's clear that these people are part of the organization. What's more, this attack had another virtue. It completely revealed Hezbollah's organization chart [...] To say that this is a terrorist attack... Who are we talking about? At some point, people have the right to defend themselves against terrorists.

Georges-Louis Bouchez, September 24, 2024

This statement was the subject of a current affairs question in the plenary session of the House of Representatives. Georges-Louis Bouchez caused a scandal by violating the rules of the House while the speakers were speaking, to the point of going up to the Speaker's rostrum without authorization.

Following this statement, Brussels town councillor Mourad Maimouni lodged a complaint against Georges-Louis Bouchez for apologie for terrorism.

=== Infringement of press freedom and implications for the sports betting lobby ===
In April 2024, the newspaper Le Vif wrote that Georges-Louis Bouchez had had an article suppressed from Moustique (IPM group), headlined Une enquête pointe les liens entre Georges-Louis Bouchez et les sociétés de paris sportifs. The depublication of this article was considered a "serious attack on press freedom" by Ecolo MP Gilles Vanden Burre.

The article in question is a French translation of the Humo investigation, which, through the testimony of leading figures from the OpenVLD, MR and Vooruit parties, demonstrates that Georges-Louis Bouchez has close links with several sports betting companies, including Ladbrokes. Groen MP Stefaan Van Hecke points out that Georges-Louis Bouchez is "sponsored by Ladbrokes as a rally driver", while Melissa Depraetere, president of Vooruit, highlights the existence of "links between the MR and the boards of certain gambling companies".

On the other hand, Georges-Louis Bouchez is also accused of using his role as president of the MR to minimize the measures set out in the draft Royal Decree on the severe limitation of gambling advertising. Melissa Depraetere describes this decision as "highly questionable", given the exemption of amateur soccer clubs from these measures, such as Royal Francs-Borains, also sponsored by LadBrokes, of which Georges-Louis Bouchez is chairman.

=== Illegal overlapping of mandates ===
In January 2022, the newspaper Le Vif pointed out that Georges-Louis Bouchez had been in an illegal situation since the summer of 2019 by combining his position as president of the SparkOH! science discovery park with his position as senator. While Georges-Louis Bouchez declares that "there are dozens of officials who felt it wasn't a problem", it turns out that, according to the Senate website, it's normally up to elected officials to check that their situation complies with the law. What's more, during his campaign for the MR presidency, GLB promised that he would step down from his position as co-opted senator if he were elected, something he has not done since.

On January 24, 2022, Georges-Louis Bouchez decided to resign as President of SparkOH! in order to remain a co-opted senator. While this illegal accumulation of mandates is not described as the "affair of the century", it does reflect the tensions generated around Georges-Louis Bouchez's actions. PS provincial deputy Pascal Lafosse declared that Georges-Louis Bouchez "unacceptably places himself above the law and gives the impression that the law should only apply to others, not to him".

=== Comments on the Traveller community ===
In November 2021, a statement by Georges-Louis Bouchez concerning the presence of travellers in Harmignies led to a seizure by Unia. In August 2024, he again targeted travellers as part of the campaign for local elections. According to Unia, these new remarks contribute to the stigmatization of this community.

=== Ministerial casting incident in 2020 ===
To sit in the new De Croo government, Georges-Louis Bouchez proposed two ministers: Sophie Wilmès – former Prime Minister – and David Clarinval, former Minister for the Civil Service, as well as a Secretary of State, Mathieu Michel, President of the Provincial College of Walloon Brabant, son of Louis Michel and brother of Charles Michel. He also appointed Denis Ducarme as minister to replace Valérie De Bue in the Walloon government, but quickly had to backtrack as an internal rule required at least a third of ministers to be women.

A number of female MR members show their support for Valérie De Bue. This episode created unease within the MR, with some party executives criticizing the lack of consultation and collegiality surrounding the appointments. On October 6, 2020, Georges-Louis Bouchez apologized in a video posted on social networks. To put an end to the internal crisis, the party's executives decide to set up a "G11", the aim of which is to create a forum for discussing decisions and ensuring a better exchange of information between the various players in the Mouvement Réformateur. Willy Borsu declared that "this is Georges-Louis Bouchez's last chance".

=== Poor knowledge of Dutch ===
French-speaking Georges-Louis Bouchez is criticized for his poor understanding and use of Dutch, one of his country's official languages. In his opinion, the Walloon education system is to blame for the fact that he doesn't speak Dutch when he leaves school.

=== Product placement ===
In August 2024, Georges-Louis Bouchez was singled out by the press following a product placement posted on his social networks. The "new sponsor of the Francs-Borains" raises questions not only about the ethics and transparency that an elected official should adopt, but also about the link between the MR president and the sponsor's founder, Fabien Debecq, cited by the Panama Papers for owning accounts and shell companies in numerous tax havens.

=== Self-promotion on Wikipedia ===
At the end of August 2024, Georges-Louis Bouchez's Wikipedia page became the subject of suspicions of self-promotion, in violation of Wikipedia's terms of use. These suspicions concern the modifications of a user whose eponymous linkedin page states that he has been a "SEO consultant" since January 2024 at Onlyne, the company that handles Georges-Louis Bouchez's communications. On September 3, 2024, Georges-Louis Bouchez's spokesman admitted to the newspaper Het Laatste Nieuws that there had been a desire to modify the page, stating "you can see that the page is not complete".

=== Public perception ===
In September 2020, the daily Het Belang van Limburg described him as a "master saboteur, the Sarkozy of the Rue de la Loi who sees himself as greater than he is".

On January 15, 2022, Belgian Federal Justice Minister Vincent Van Quickenborne declared in the Flemish newspaper Het Laatste Niews that "Georges-Louis Bouchez barks while we act:. He described Georges-Louis Bouchez as someone who "always returns to the past", and said of the MR that "it is not the Mouvement réformateur, but rather the Mouvement réactionnaire".

On March 6, 2022, at an MR event in Namur, Georges-Louis Bouchez was "flogged" by Gilets Jaunes activists.

In 2023, he appeared on the reality show "Special Forces: qui ose gagne" on the Flemish channel VTM. As part of the show, several celebrities travelled to Morocco to take part in the Special Forces military training program, reputed to be the toughest in the world. In it, an initial assessment of the candidates is made, and concerning the MR president, it is stated that he "thinks of himself first, not the team". "You're dead weight. It's one thing for you to mean nothing to the team. But the fact that you're hurting it on top of that, that's unacceptable," he is quoted as saying. He left the show after two episodes.

In September 2023, Georges-Louis Bouchez was pied in the face at a book signing at the Fnac in Liège.

=== Disabled Parking (PMR) Card and threat against a journalist ===
On July 30, 2025, RTBF published an article based on reporting by Le Vif, questioning the legitimacy of a "PMR card" (handicapped parking) associated with Georges-Louis Bouchez's official driver. The article noted that Bouchez and his partner had also reportedly benefited from the fraudulently used card. Shortly after publication, Bouchez called an RTBF radio journalist in an angry tone. Although the journalist clarified that she wasn't the author of the written article and even offered to help correct inaccuracies, Bouchez continued to lash out aggressively.

Significantly, Bouchez warned:

I swear he [article author] will be very well received… and he may very well need a card afterwards.

Journalists present interpreted this as a physical threat suggesting the journalist's colleague might end up requiring a "PMR card" due to physical harm. A spokesperson for Bouchez later claimed he had been misunderstood, and that he meant a "press card," not a PMR card, but the journalist and her editors considered the comment unequivocal and menacing.

== Business career ==
Apart from his political career, Bouchez is the owner and chairman of Challenger Pro League Boussu football club Francs Borains.

== Books ==
- G.-L. Bouchez, L'aurore d'un monde nouveau, Éditions du CEP, 2017. ISBN 978-2390070313
