= Sabine de Bethune =

Belgian politician

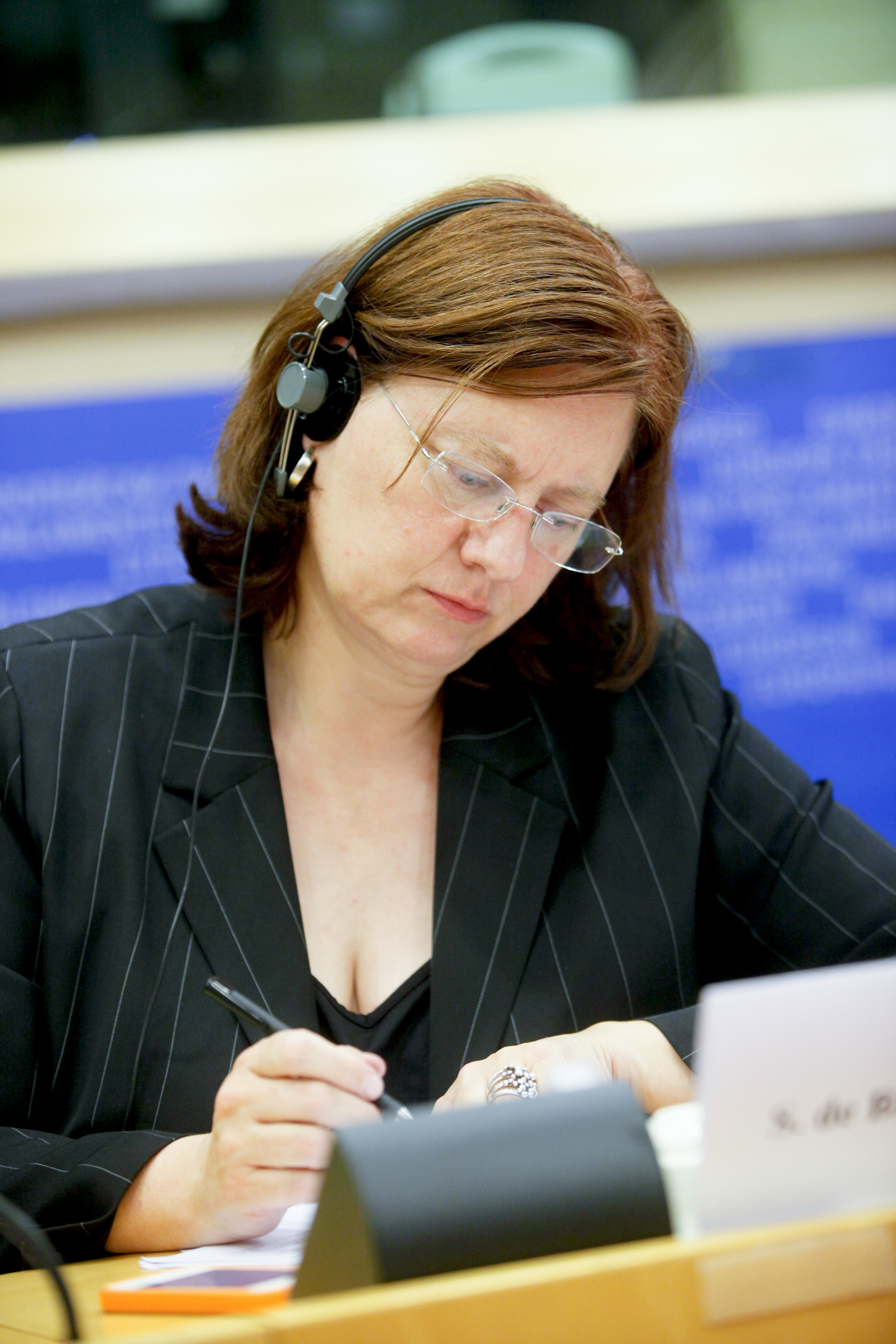
- Sabine de Bethune in 2011

President of the Senate
- In office 11 October 2011 – 14 October 2014
- Preceded by: Danny Pieters
- Succeeded by: Christine Defraigne

Personal details
- Born: 16 July 1958 (age 68) Leopoldstad, Belgian Congo (now Kinshasa, Congo-Kinshasa)
- Party: Christian Democratic and Flemish
- Education: Catholic University of Leuven
- Website: Official website

Baroness Sabine de Bethune (born 16 July 1958) is a Belgian politician and a member of the Christian Democratic and Flemish party. Since June 2021 she has been appointed as a judge on the Constitutional Court.

The daughter of former Kortrijk mayor, Emmanuel de Bethune, she belongs to a baronial family of the Belgian nobility, in right of which she is properly styled baroness. Sabine de Bethune. She holds a Master of Laws from the Katholieke Universiteit Leuven.

She was elected as a member of the Belgian Senate in 1995. Sabine is also a member of the AWEPA Governing Council. She was vice-president of the Senate between 1999 and 2003, and became the 34th President of the Belgian Senate on 11 October 2011. She became an Officer in the Order of Leopold on 6 June 2010 and a Grand Officer on 21 May 2014.

== Notes ==
Political offices
Preceded by Danny Pieters	President of the Senate; 2011–2014	Succeeded by Christine Defraigne
