= Sabine Laruelle =

Belgian politician (born 1965)

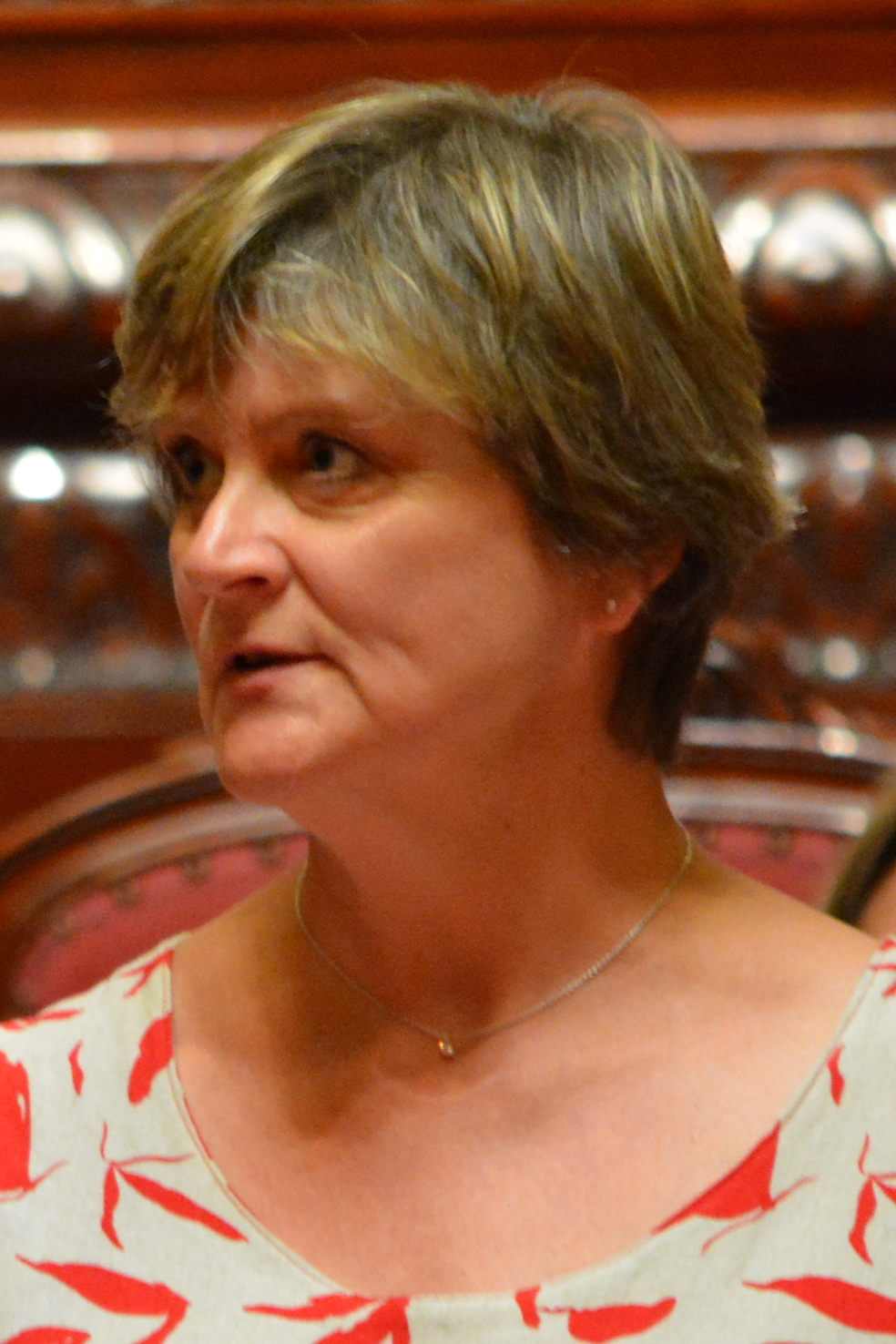
- Laruelle in 2019

President of the Belgian Senate
- In office 18 July 2019 – 13 October 2020
- Preceded by: Jacques Brotchi
- Succeeded by: Stephanie D'Hose

Personal details
- Born: 2 June 1965 (age 61) Huy, Belgium
- Party: Reformist Movement

Sabine Laruelle (French pronunciation: [sabin laʁɥɛl]; born 2 June 1965) is a Belgian politician and a member of the liberal party Mouvement Réformateur.

She has been federal minister for the Self-employed and Agriculture (2003-2008), federal minister for the Self-employed, Agriculture and Science Policy (2008-2011). Sabine Laruelle sit again in the Federal Government from December 2011 to October 2014 as Minister of the Self-employed, SME's and Agriculture. She is also member of the Municipal council of Gembloux, where she lives nowadays.

Sabine Laruelle is an Agronomist engineer and environment advisor with a Certificate in administrative management.

Political offices
Preceded by Jacques Brotchi	President of the Belgian Senate; 2019–2020	Succeeded by Stephanie D'Hose
