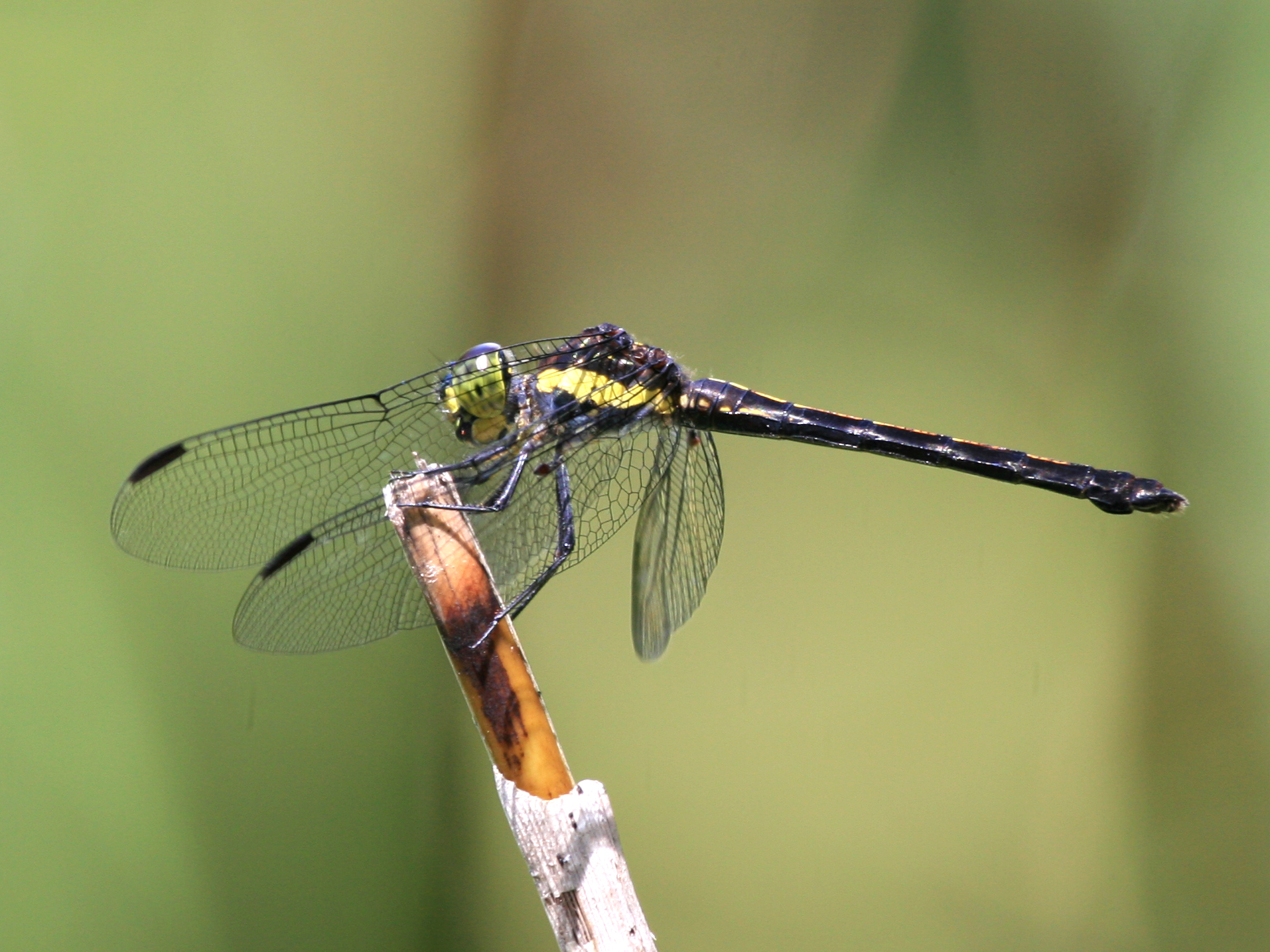
- Female
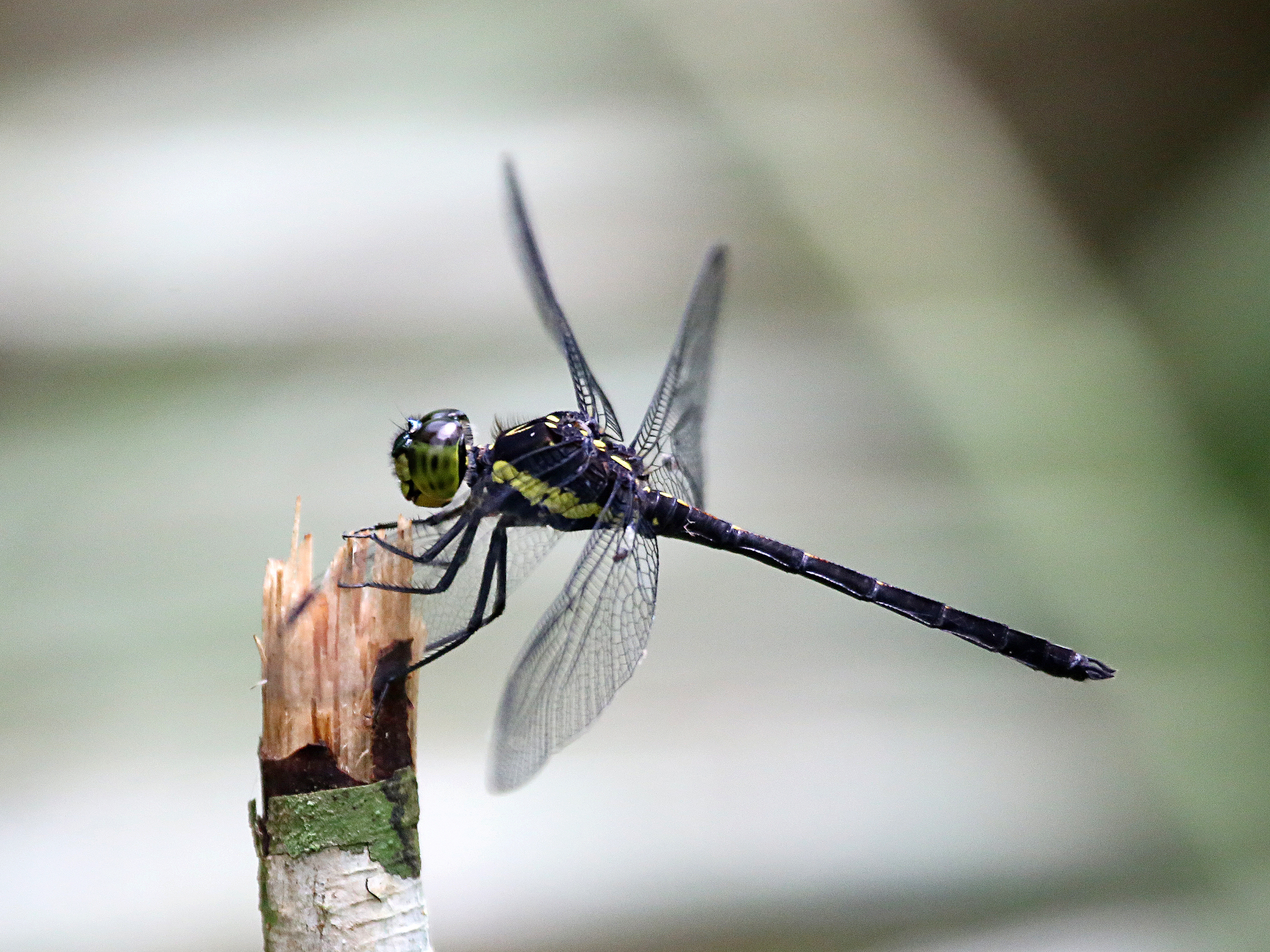
- Male

Scientific classification
- Kingdom: Animalia
- Phylum: Arthropoda
- Clade: Pancrustacea
- Class: Insecta
- Order: Odonata
- Suborder: Anisoptera
- Superfamily: Libelluloidea
- Family: Libellulidae
- Genus: Agrionoptera
- Species: A. longitudinalis
- Subspecies: A. l. biserialis

Trinomial name
- Agrionoptera longitudinalis biserialis Selys, 1879

Synonyms
- Agrionoptera regalis Tillyard, 1908

= Agrionoptera longitudinalis biserialis =

Striped swampdragon

Subspecies of dragonfly

Agrionoptera longitudinalis biserialis known as the striped swampdragon is a subspecies of dragonfly in the family Libellulidae. It is found in Australia and New Guinea. Its usual habitat is in the vicinity of shaded pools and tree holes.

Agrionoptera longitudinalis biserialis is a large dragonfly (wingspan 100mm, length 55mm), with a prominent yellow stripe on its synthorax, and yellow markings on a dark abdomen. The frons is a bright metallic green. Its range in Australia is from the tip of Cape York Peninsula to around Rockhampton on the central Queensland coast. The species has not yet been assessed in the IUCN Red List, but is listed in the Catalog of Life

== Etymology ==
The genus name Agrionoptera combines Agrion, a genus name derived from the Greek ἄγριος (agrios, "wild"), with the Greek –πτερος (pteros, "winged"), referring to the similarity of the wings to those of Agrion.

The species name longitudinalis is derived from the Latin longitudo ("length"), referring to the distinct yellow band running along the length of the thorax.

The subspecies name biserialis is derived from the Latin bi- ("two") and series ("row"), with the suffix -alis ("relating to"), referring to the row of two cells in the wing that differs from Agrionoptera longitudinalis of the Moluccas.

== Gallery ==
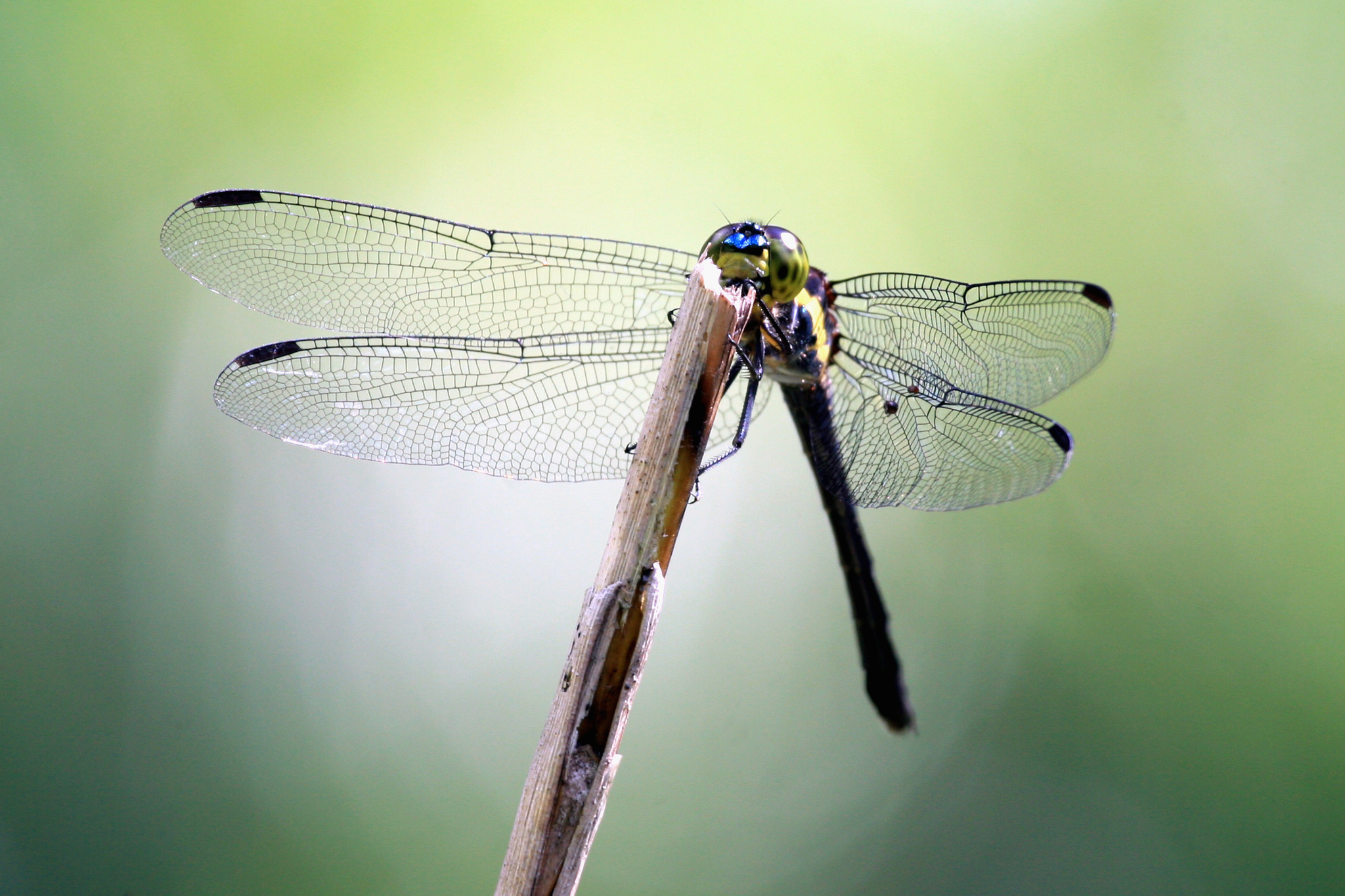
Female face on

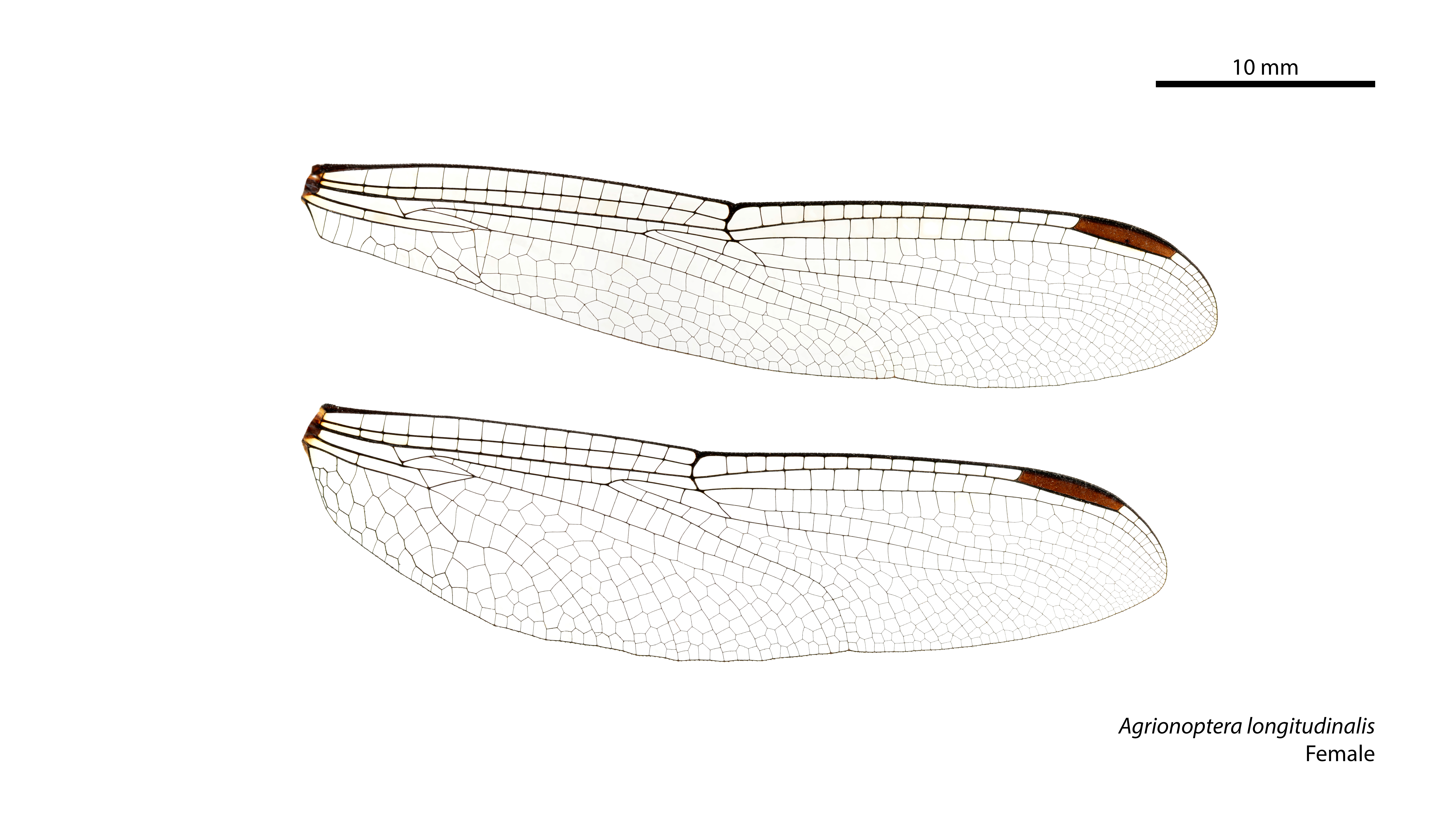
Female wings

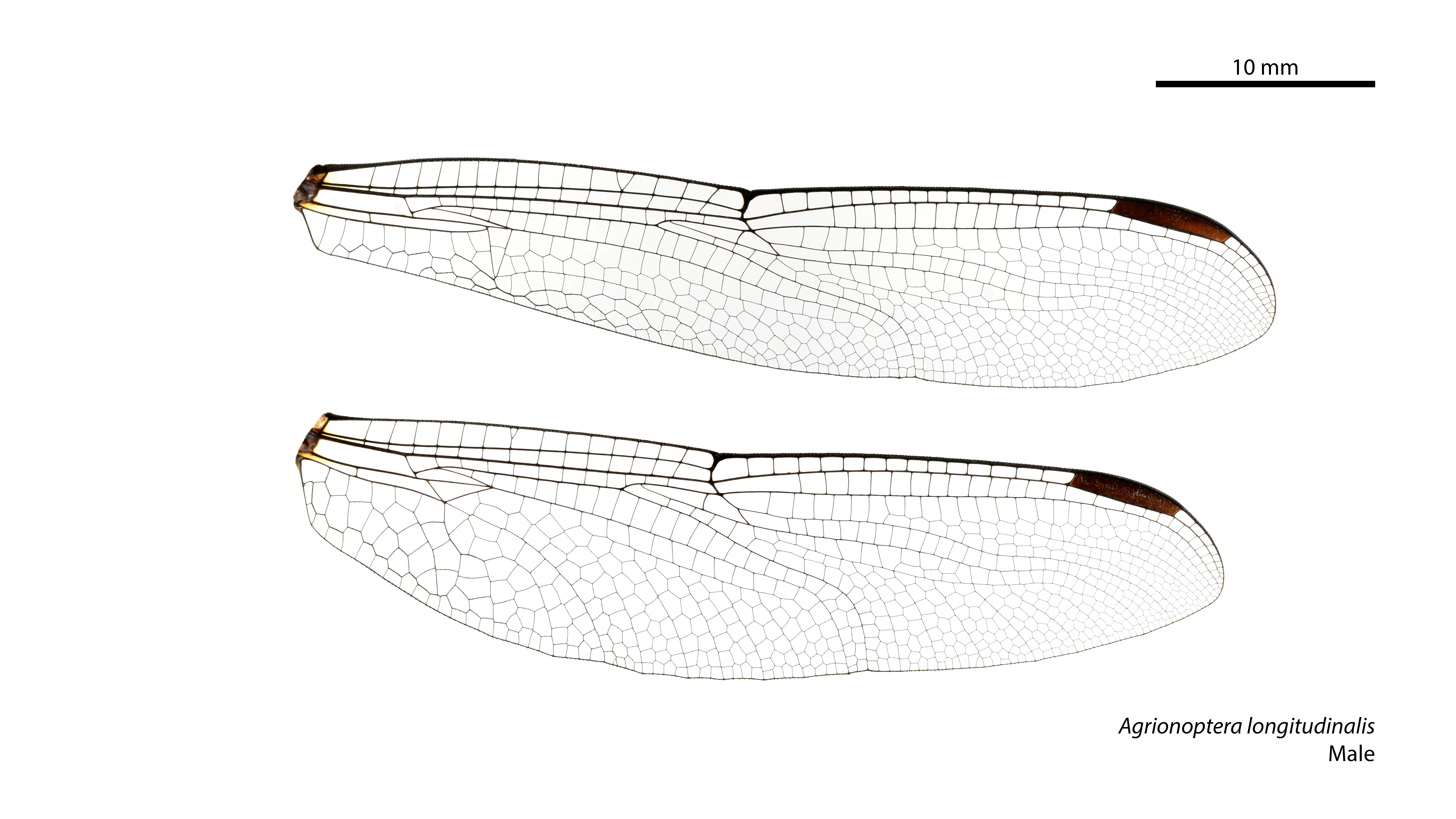
Male wings

== See also ==
- List of Odonata species of Australia
