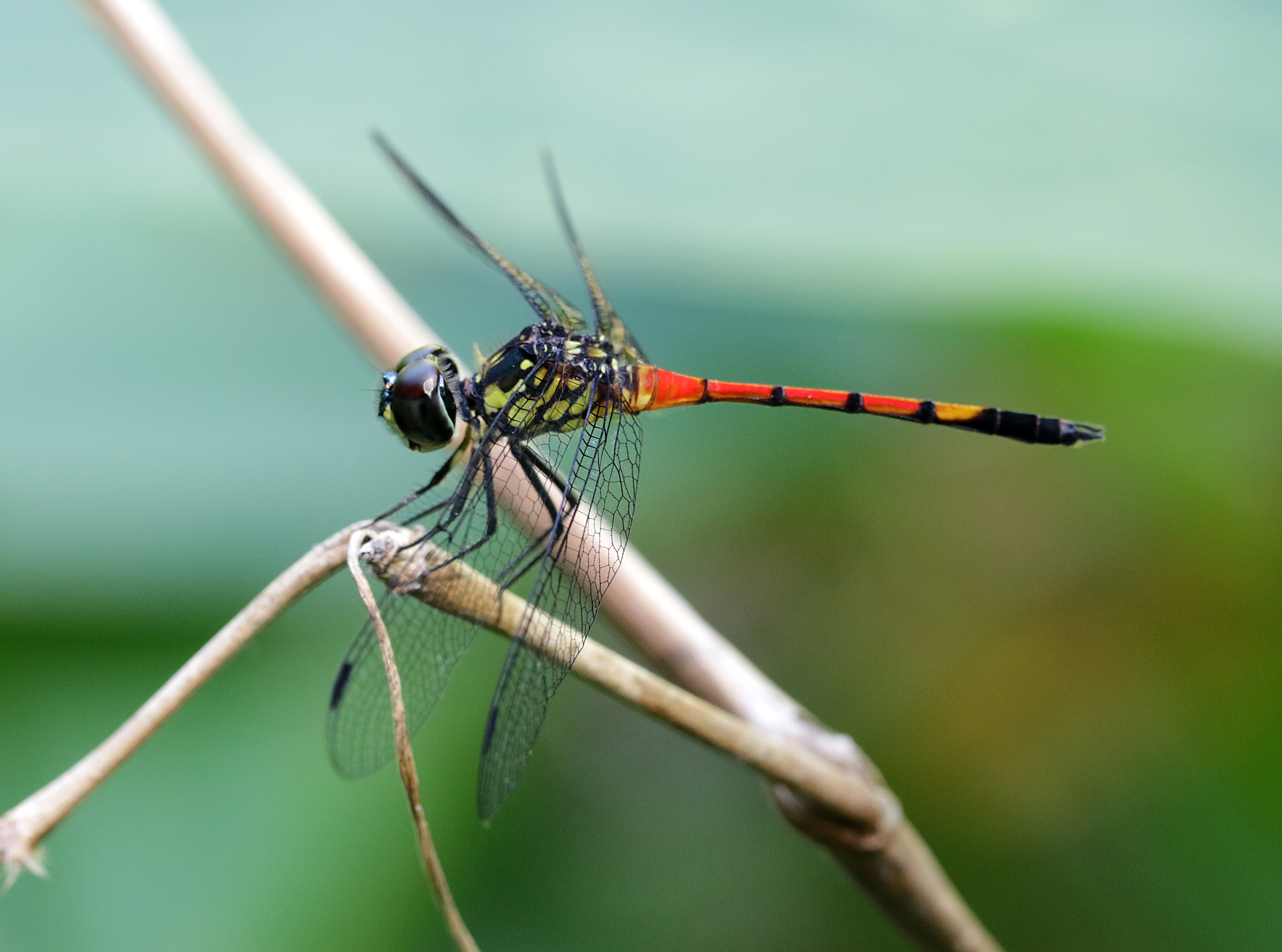
- Male
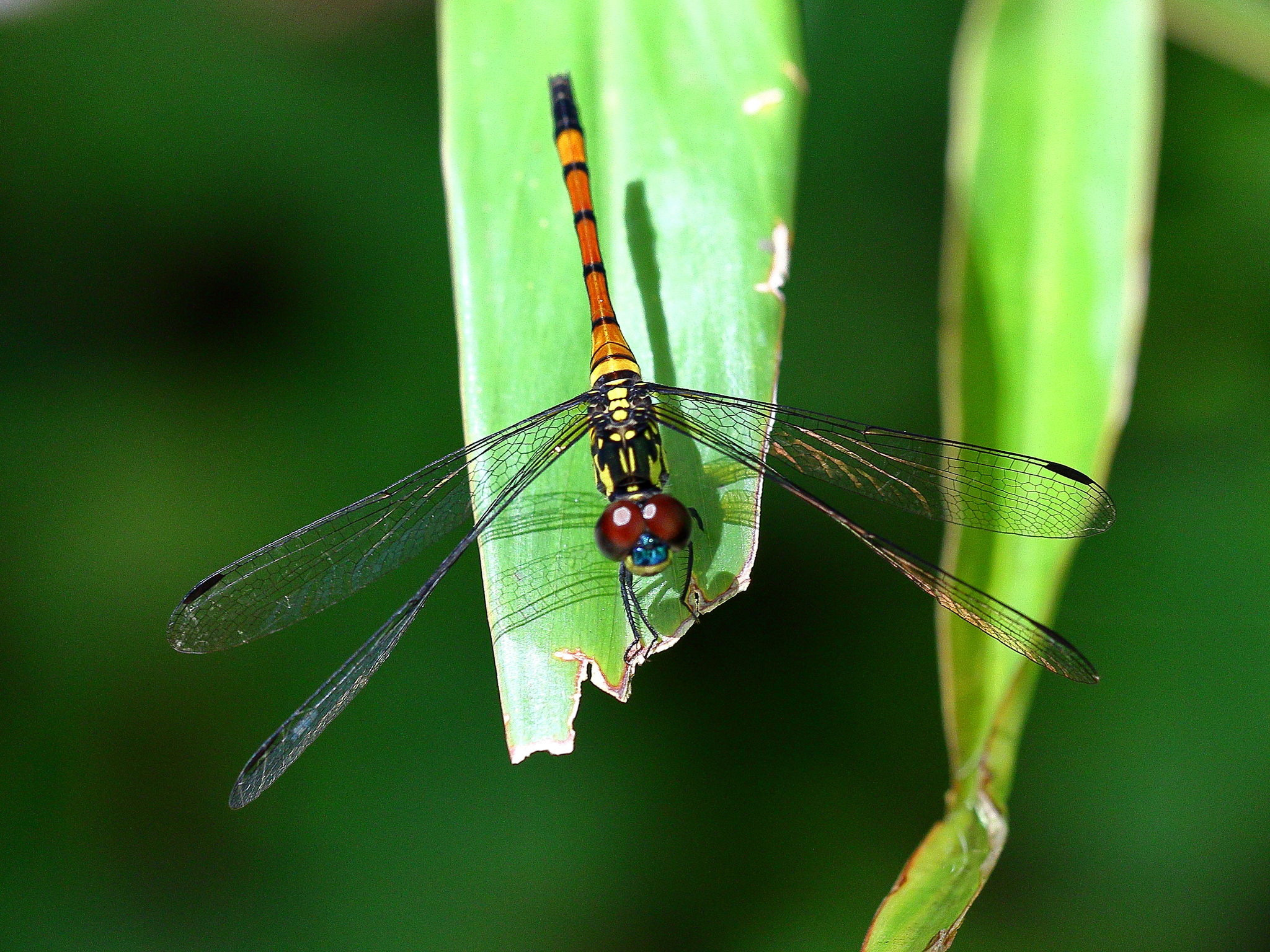
- Female

Conservation status
- Least Concern (IUCN 3.1)

Scientific classification
- Kingdom: Animalia
- Phylum: Arthropoda
- Clade: Pancrustacea
- Class: Insecta
- Order: Odonata
- Infraorder: Anisoptera
- Family: Libellulidae
- Genus: Agrionoptera
- Species: A. insignis
- Subspecies: A. i. allogenes

Trinomial name
- Agrionoptera insignis allogenes Tillyard, 1908

= Agrionoptera insignis allogenes =

Red Swampdragon

Subspecies of dragonfly

Agrionoptera insignis allogenes known as the red swampdragon is a subspecies of dragonfly in the family Libellulidae. It is found in Australia, New Guinea, the Solomon Islands and possibly New Caledonia.

The usual habitat of Agrionoptera insignis allogenes is in the vicinity of shaded ponds, creeks and swamps. It is of medium size (wingspan 70mm, length 40mm), with prominent yellow and black markings on its synthorax, and a reddish or orange abdomen with a black tip. The frons is a bright metallic green. Its range in Australia is from the top end of the Northern Territory, across northern Australia to midway down the east coast of New South Wales. The species has been assessed for the IUCN Red List as Least Concern.

== Etymology ==
The genus name Agrionoptera combines Agrion, a genus name derived from the Greek ἄγριος (agrios, "wild"), with the Greek –πτερος (pteros, "winged"), referring to the similarity of the wings to those of Agrion.

The species name insignis is Latin for "remarkable", referring to the narrow base of the hindwings.

The subspecies name allogenes is derived from the Greek ἄλλος (allos, "another" or "different") and γένεσις (genesis, "origin"), referring to the subspecies being distinctly different from those found in Java.

== Gallery ==
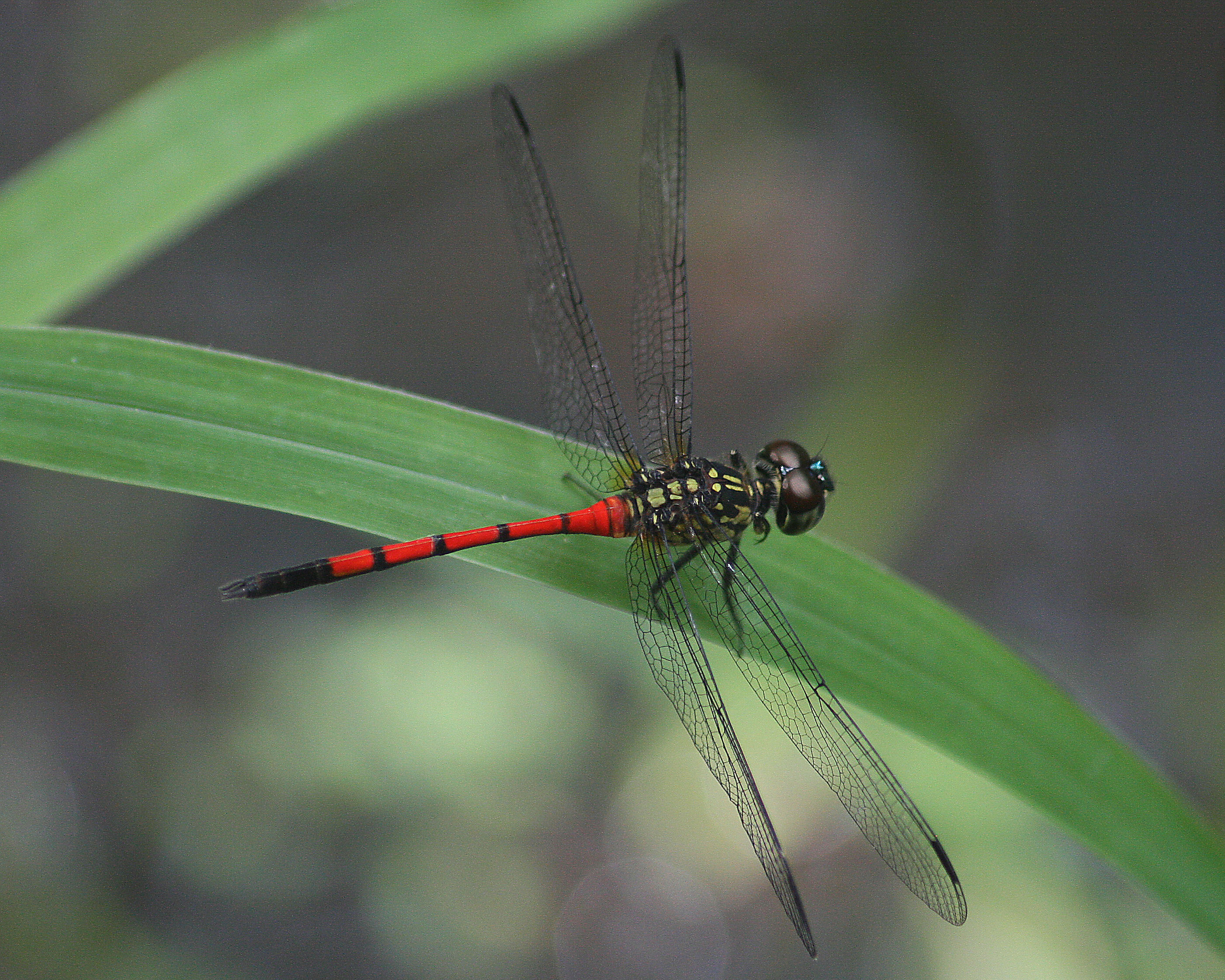
Male from above

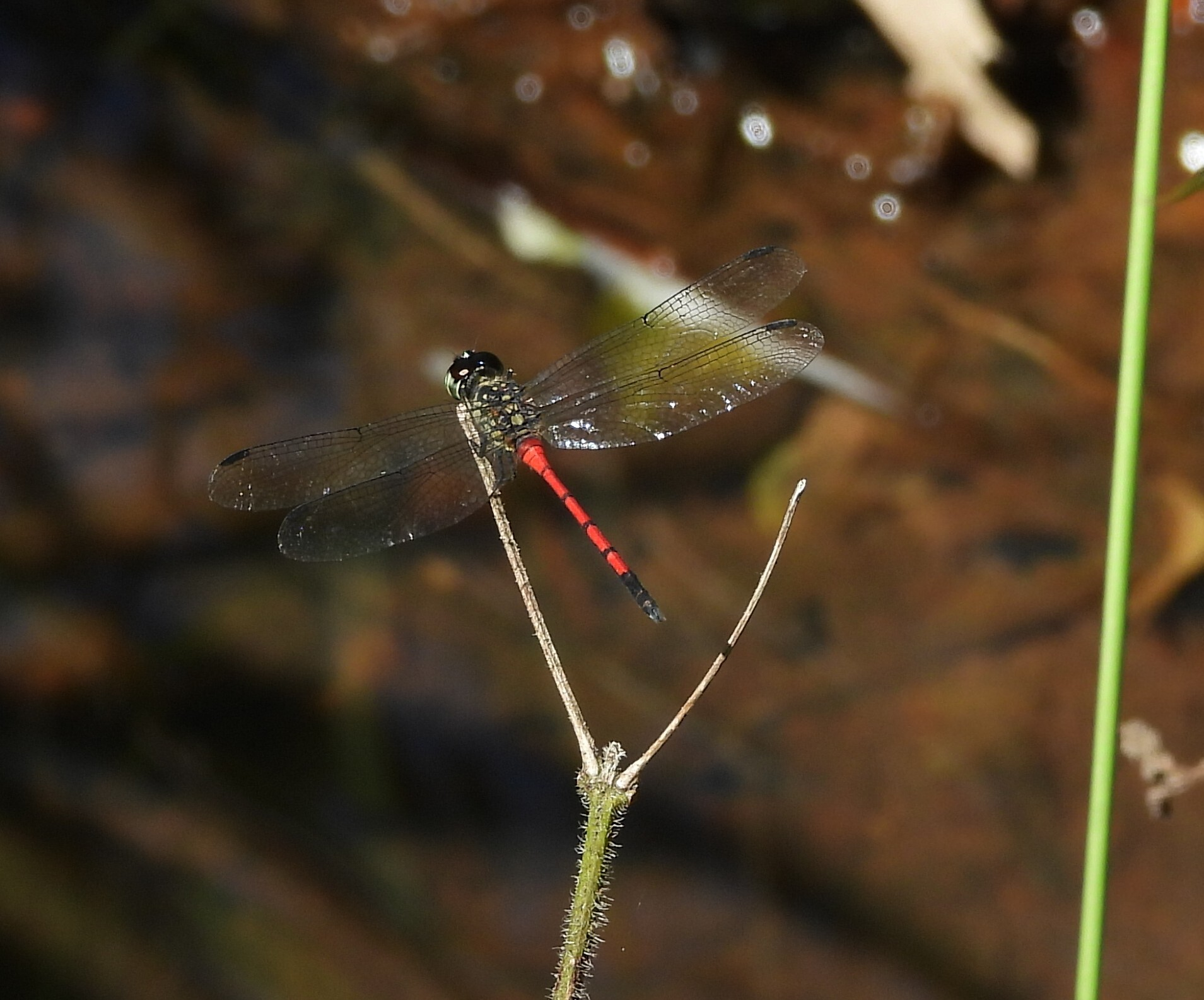
Male

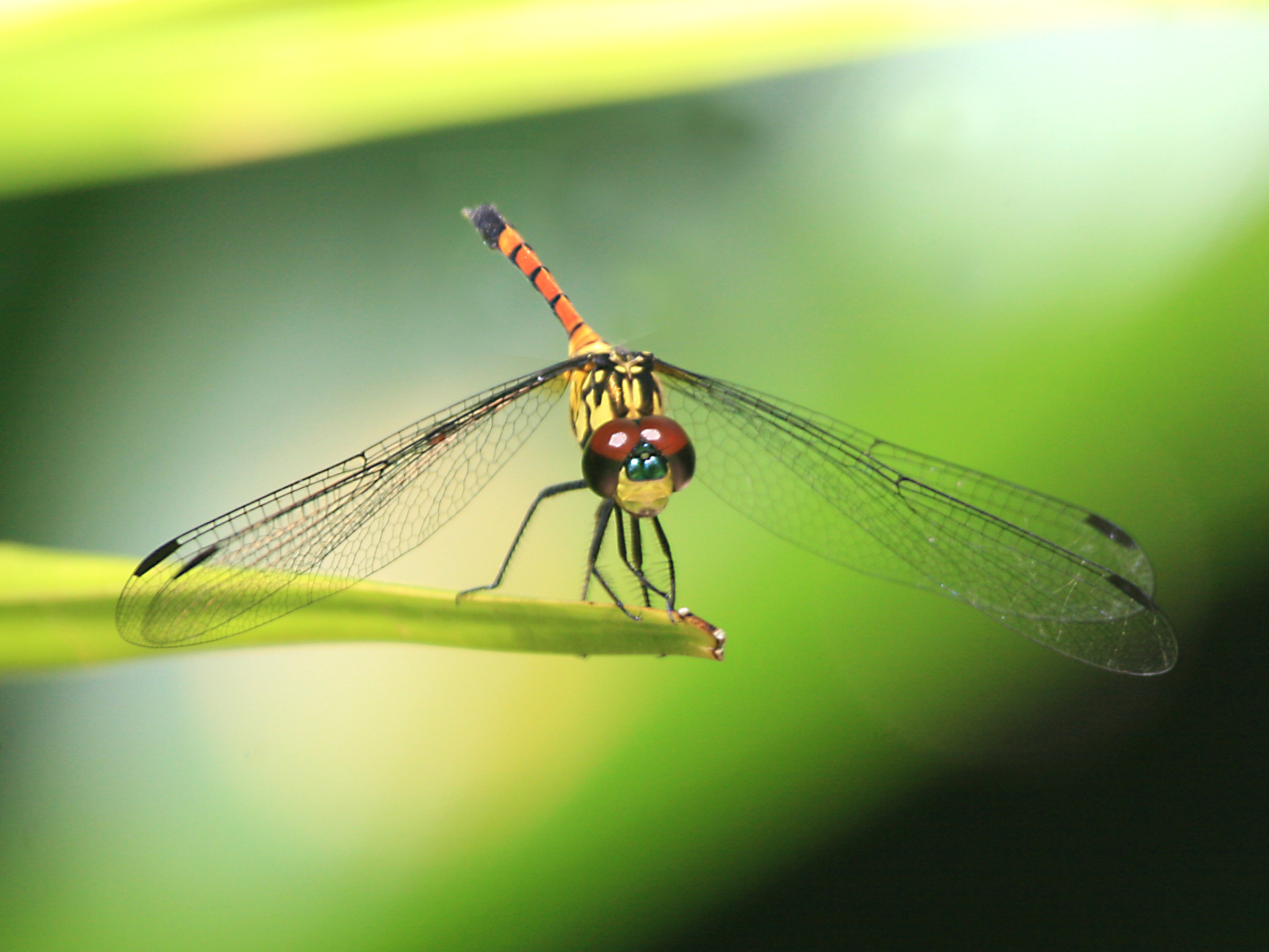
Female face on

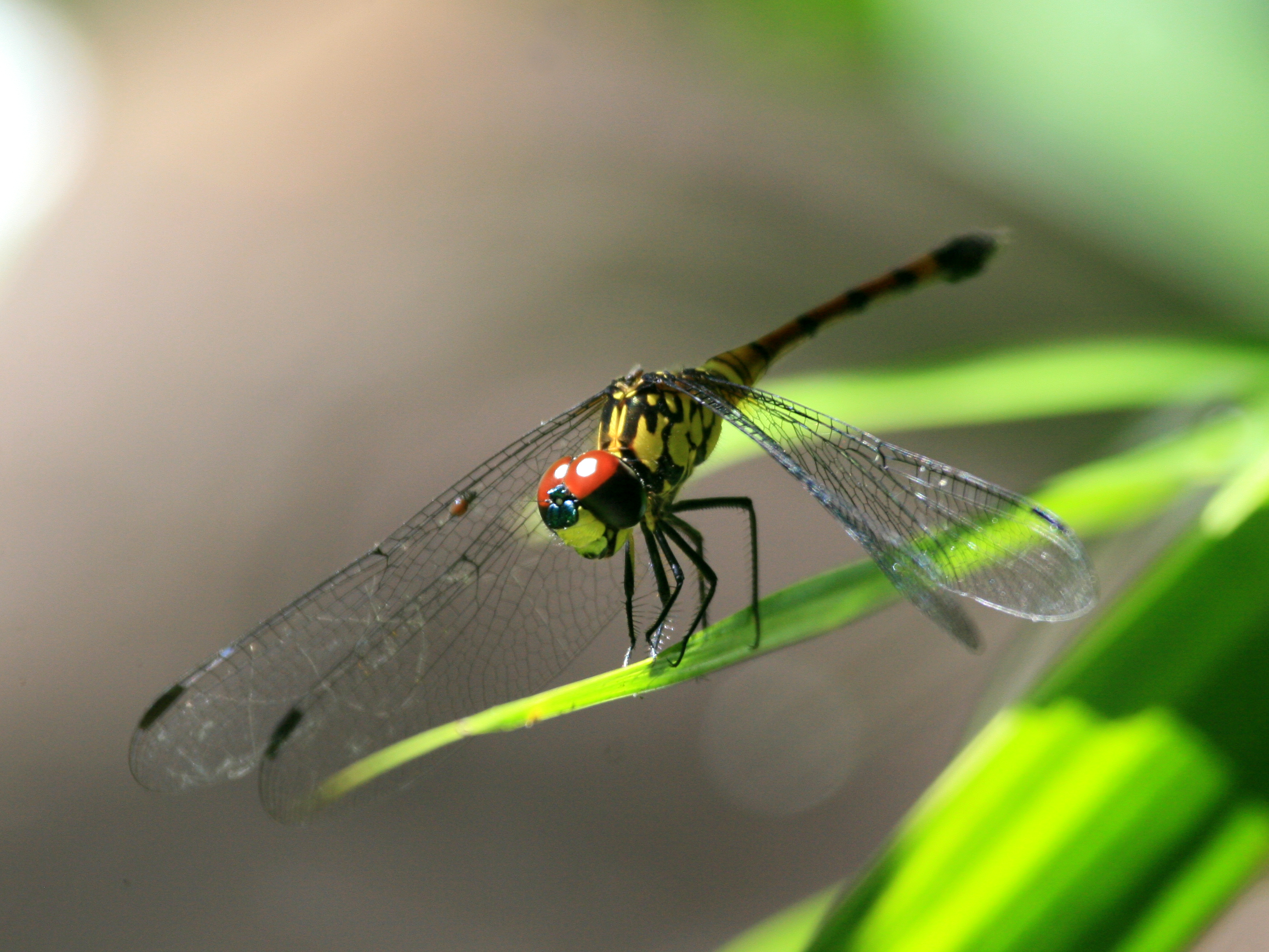
Yellow mouth parts

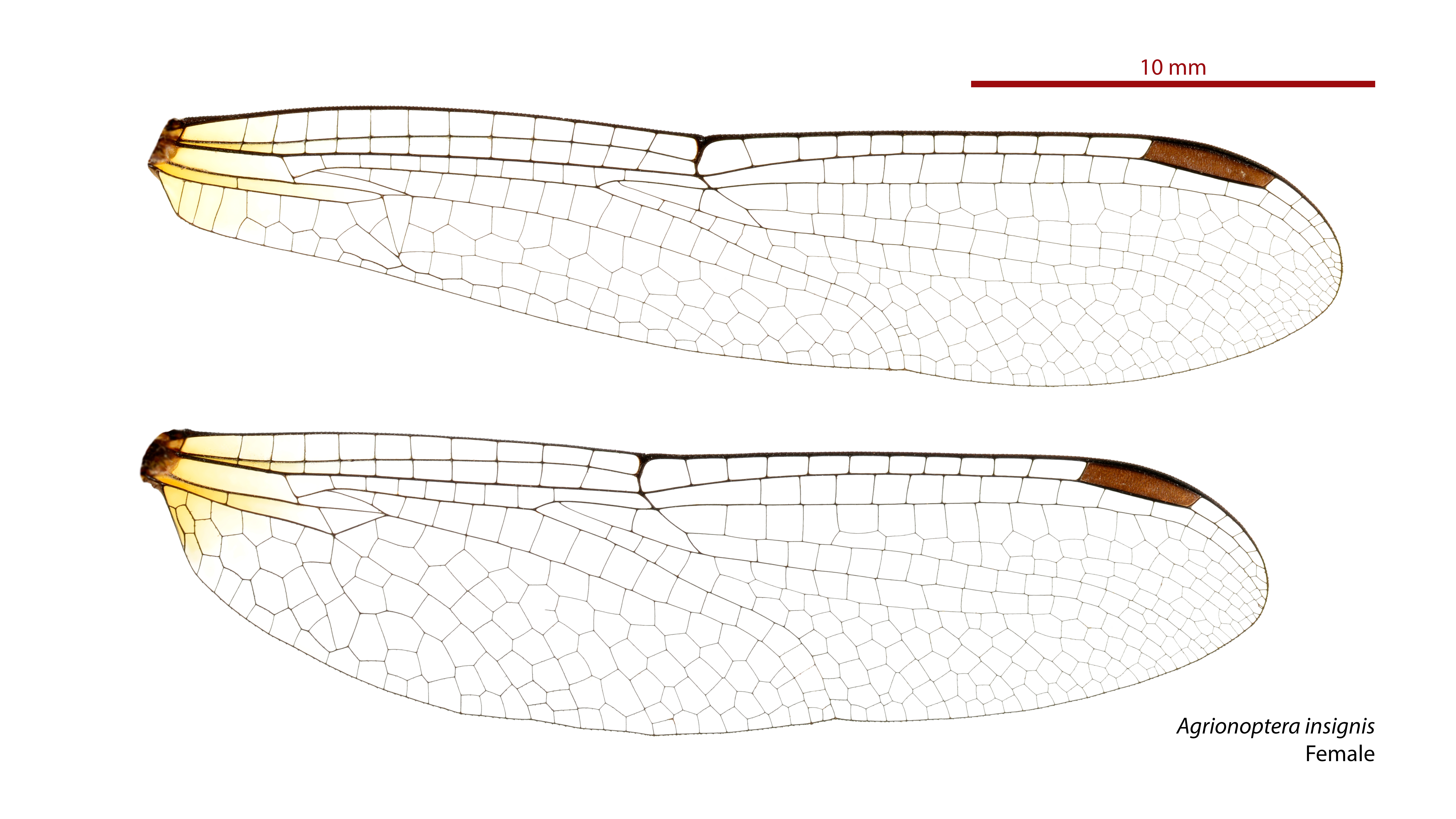
Female wings

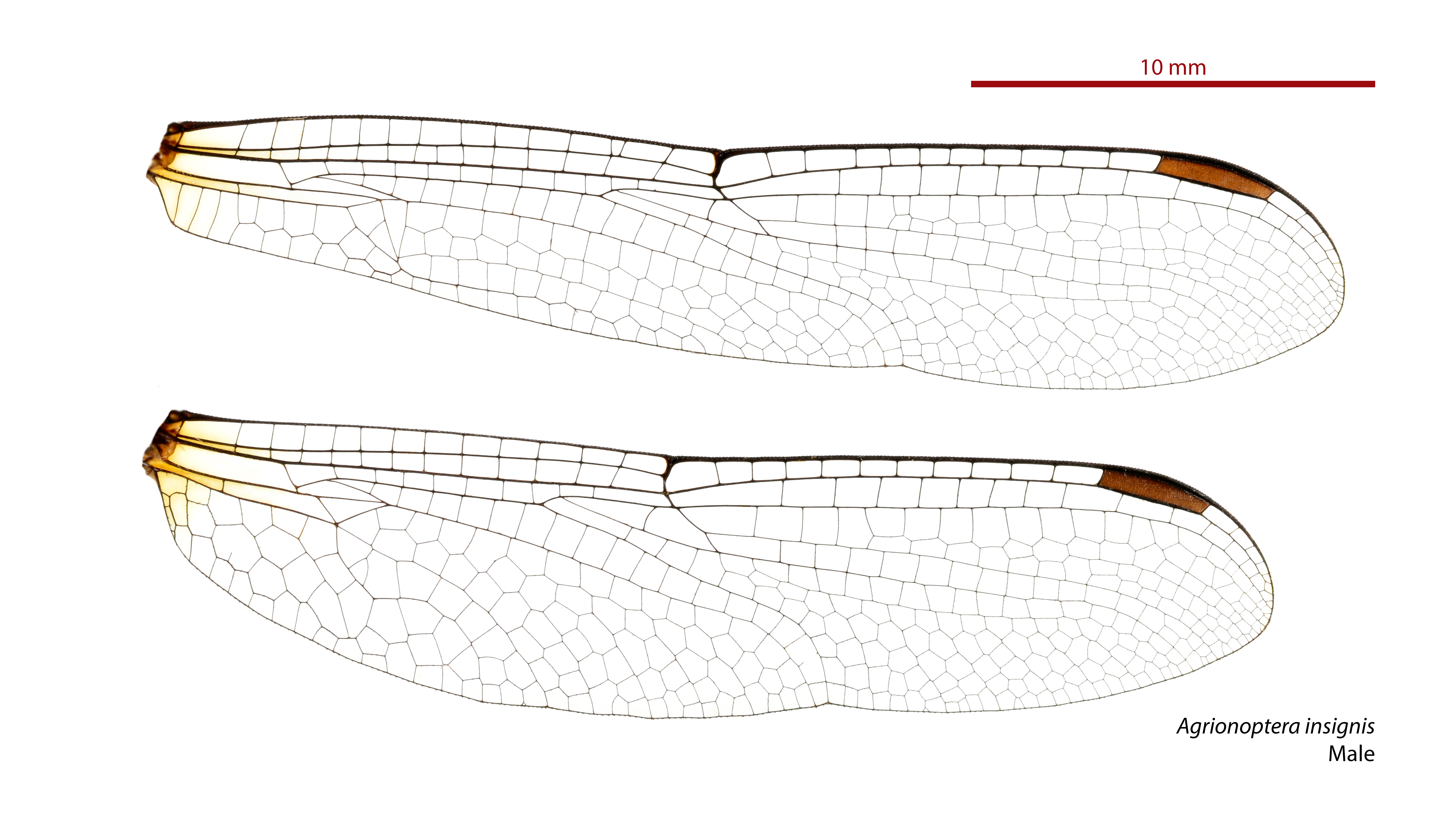
Male wings

== See also ==
- List of Odonata species of Australia
