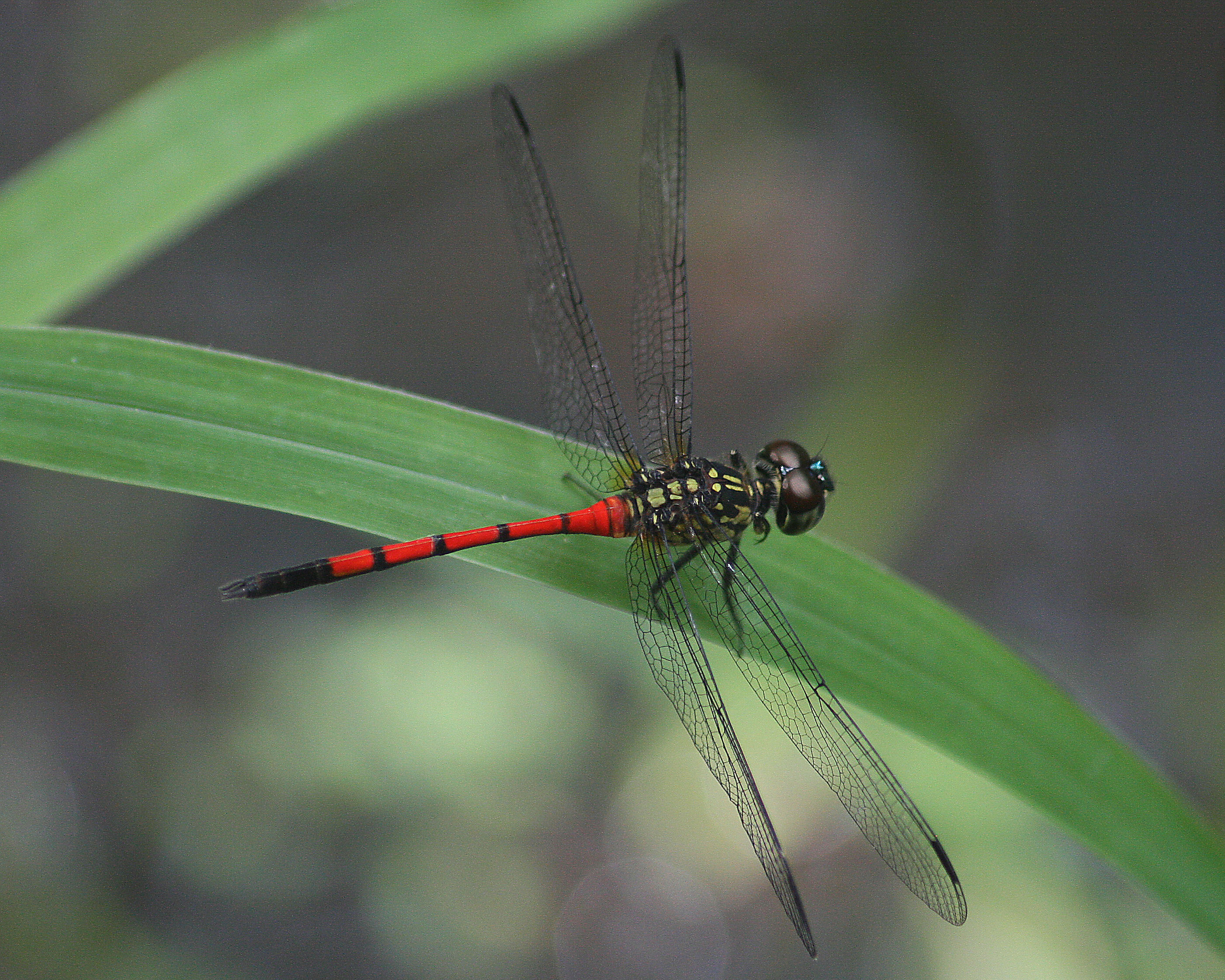
- Red swampdragon

Scientific classification
- Kingdom: Animalia
- Phylum: Arthropoda
- Clade: Pancrustacea
- Class: Insecta
- Order: Odonata
- Infraorder: Anisoptera
- Family: Libellulidae
- Subfamily: Libellulinae
- Genus: Agrionoptera; Brauer, 1864

= Agrionoptera =

Genus of dragonflies

Agrionoptera is a genus of dragonflies in the family Libellulidae. Species of Agrionoptera are found across India, Southeast Asia and the Pacific.

== Species ==
The genus Agrionoptera includes the following species:

- Agrionoptera cardinalis Lieftinck, 1962
- Agrionoptera insignis (Rambur, 1842) – red swampdragon

- subspecies Agrionoptera insignis allogenes (Tillyard, 1908) – red swampdragon

- Agrionoptera longitudinalis Selys, 1878

- subspecies Agrionoptera longitudinalis biserialis (Selys, 1879) – striped swampdragon

- Agrionoptera sanguinolenta Lieftinck, 1962
- Agrionoptera sexlineata Selys, 1879

== Etymology ==
The genus name Agrionoptera combines Agrion, a genus name derived from the Greek ἄγριος (agrios, "wild"), with the Greek –πτερος (pteros, "winged"), referring to the similarity of the wings to those of Agrion.
