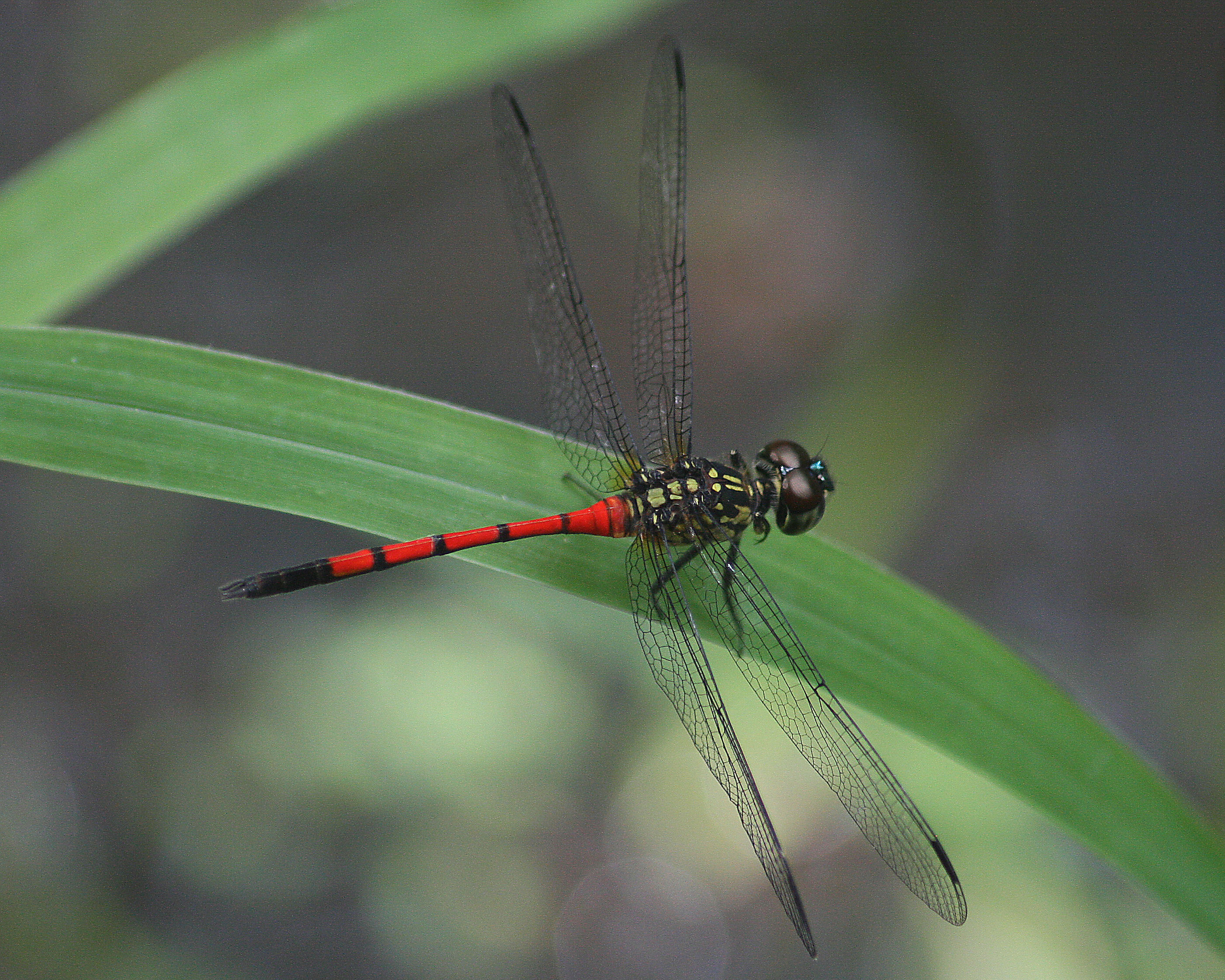
- Red swampdragon Agrionoptera insignis allogenes

Conservation status
- Least Concern (IUCN 3.1)

Scientific classification
- Kingdom: Animalia
- Phylum: Arthropoda
- Clade: Pancrustacea
- Class: Insecta
- Order: Odonata
- Infraorder: Anisoptera
- Family: Libellulidae
- Genus: Agrionoptera
- Species: A. insignis

Binomial name
- Agrionoptera insignis (Rambur, 1842)

Synonyms
- Libellula insignis Rambur, 1842; Agrionoptera nicobarica Brauer, 1865; Agrionoptera quatuornotata Brauer, 1867; Agrionoptera papuensis Selys, 1879; Agrionoptera insularis Kirby, 1889; Agrionoptera karschi Förster, 1898; Agrionoptera salomonis Förster, 1898; Agrionoptera variabilis Krüger, 1902; Agrionoptera guamensis Lieftinck, 1962

= Agrionoptera insignis =

Species of dragonfly

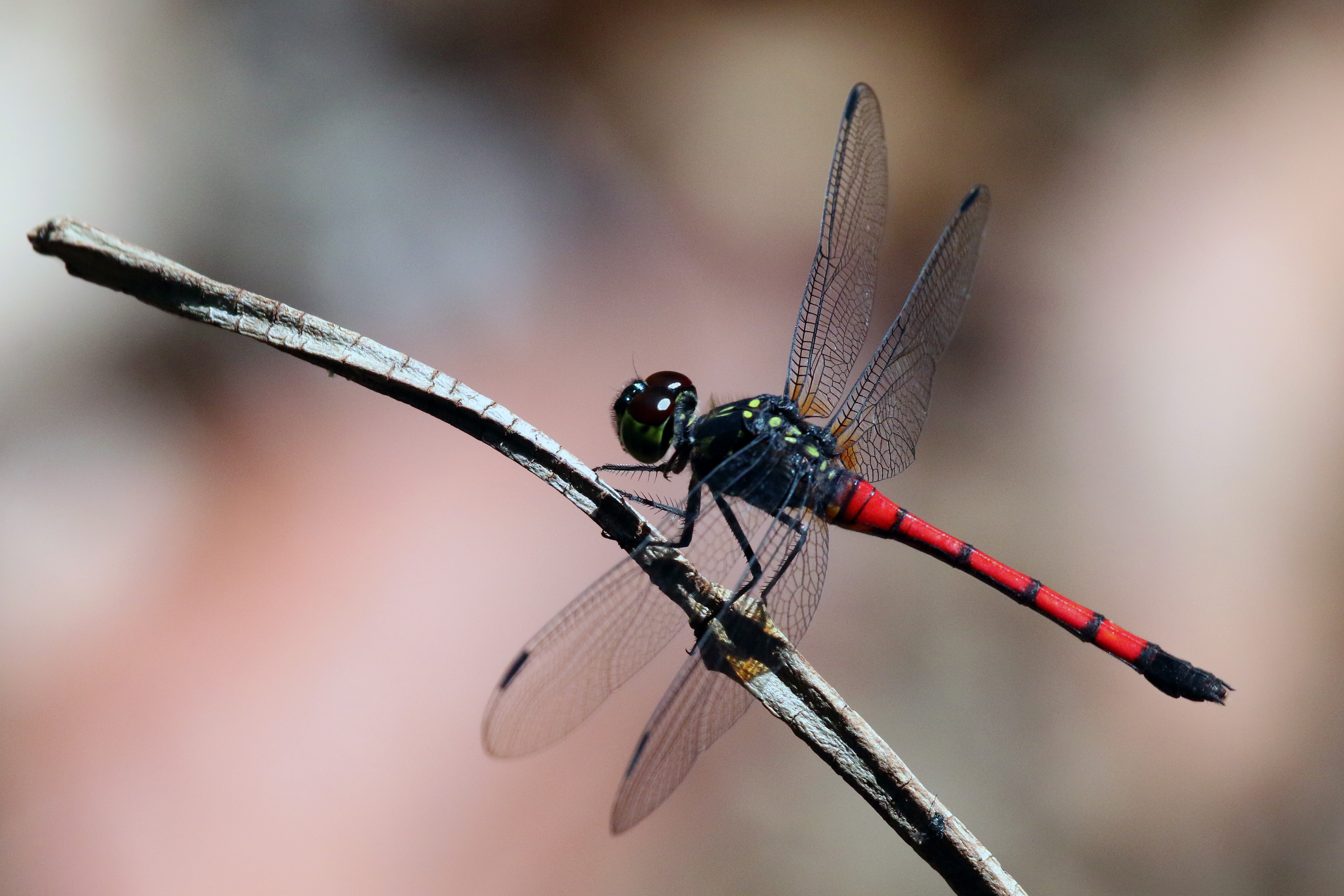
Grenadier Agrionoptera insignis insignis Sabah, Borneo

Agrionoptera insignis is a species of dragonfly in the family Libellulidae. It is native to much of eastern Asia and Oceania, occurring as far north as Japan and as far south as Australia. It is common in most of its range. The circumscription of the species is not entirely clear, so if the species is redescribed, its status may change. Common names include grenadier.

The male of this species is generally 37 to 41 millimeters long, the hindwing about 28 to 30 millimeters long. The thorax is metallic green with yellow mottling. The eyes are brown and yellow. The abdomen is mostly red with a black tip. The abdomen of the female is duller in color.

This species lives in swampy areas, including disturbed habitat.

== Subspecies ==
There are several subspecies, not all of which are thought to be valid taxa.

Subspecies include:

- Agrionoptera insignis allogenes – red swampdragon; Australia, New Guinea, Solomon Islands, possibly New Caledonia
- Agrionoptera insignis chalcochiton – Indonesia
- Agrionoptera insignis insignis – Southeast Asia and Sundaland - Grenadier
- Agrionoptera insignis insularis – Solomon Islands
- Agrionoptera insignis lifuana – New Caledonia
- Agrionoptera insignis nereis – Enggano Island
- Agrionoptera insignis nicobarica – Nicobar Islands
- Agrionoptera insignis papuensis – New Guinea
- Agrionoptera insignis similis – Orchid Island, Taiwan

== Etymology ==
The genus name Agrionoptera combines Agrion, a genus name derived from the Greek ἄγριος (agrios, "wild"), with the Greek –πτερος (pteros, "winged"), referring to the similarity of the wings to those of Agrion.

The species name insignis is Latin for "remarkable", referring to the narrow base of the hindwings.

== See also ==
- List of Odonata species of Australia
