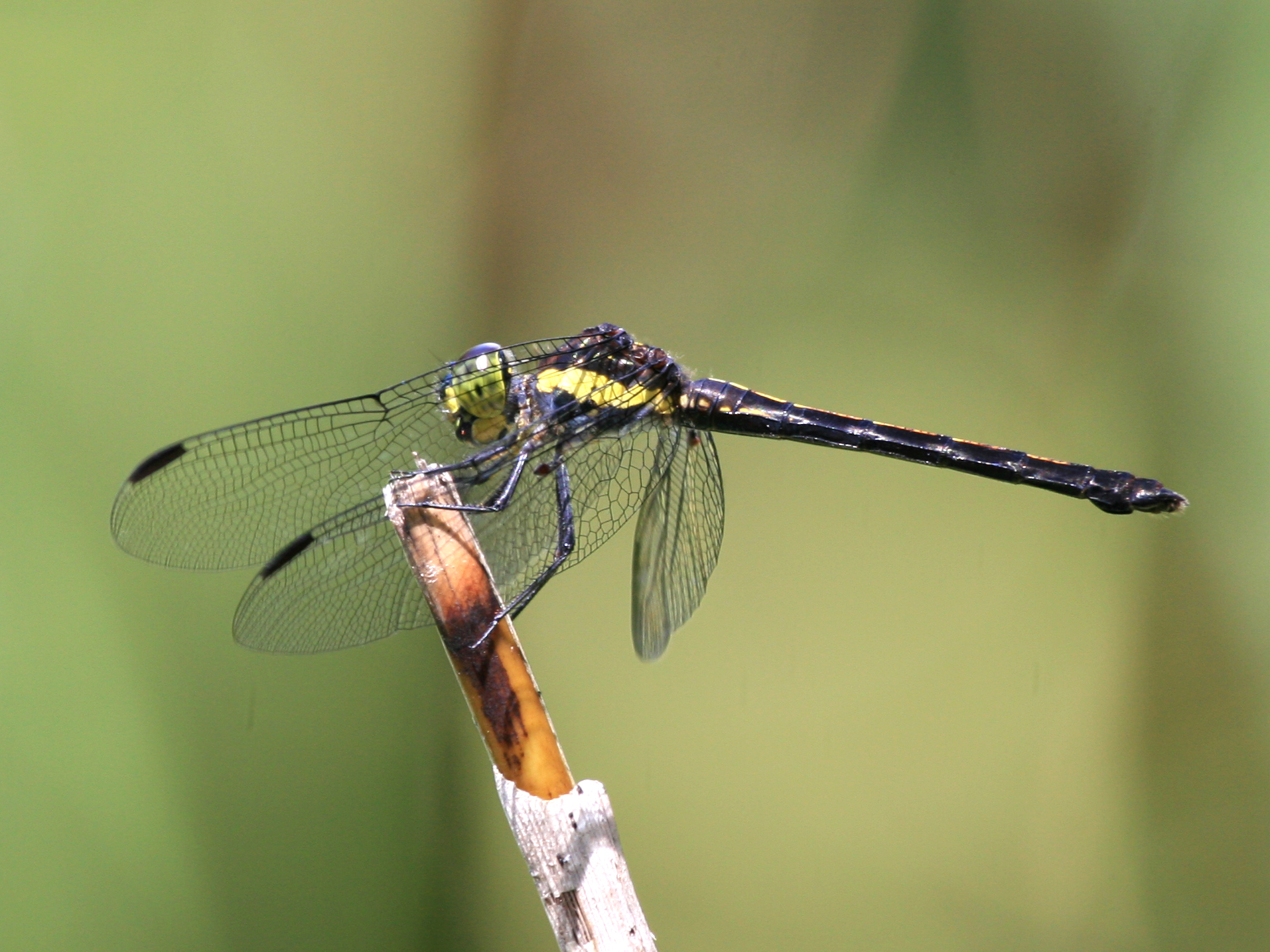
- Striped Swampdragon; Agrionoptera longitudinalis biserialis

Conservation status
- Least Concern (IUCN 3.1)

Scientific classification
- Kingdom: Animalia
- Phylum: Arthropoda
- Clade: Pancrustacea
- Class: Insecta
- Order: Odonata
- Infraorder: Anisoptera
- Family: Libellulidae
- Genus: Agrionoptera
- Species: A. longitudinalis

Binomial name
- Agrionoptera longitudinalis Selys, 1878

Synonyms
- Agrionoptera biserialis Selys, 1879; Agrionoptera regalis Tillyard, 1908

= Agrionoptera longitudinalis =

Species of dragonfly

Agrionoptera longitudinalis is a species of dragonfly in the family Libellulidae.

It is native to Indonesia, Papua New Guinea, and Queensland in Australia. It is common, even abundant in some areas.

This species can be found in most any type of standing water, including pools and tree holes. It is adaptable to disturbed habitat and can live and breed in artificial aquatic habitat types.

== Subspecies ==
Subspecies include:

- Agrionoptera longitudinalis biserialis - striped swampdragon
- Agrionoptera longitudinalis dissoluta
- Agrionoptera longitudinalis longitudinalis

== Etymology ==
The genus name Agrionoptera combines Agrion, a genus name derived from the Greek ἄγριος (agrios, "wild"), with the Greek –πτερος (pteros, "winged"), referring to the similarity of the wings to those of Agrion.

The species name longitudinalis is derived from the Latin longitudo ("length"), referring to the distinct yellow band running along the length of the thorax.
