= Austrogomphus pusillus =

Tiny hunter

Conservation status
- Data Deficient (IUCN 3.1)

Scientific classification
- Kingdom: Animalia
- Phylum: Arthropoda
- Clade: Pancrustacea
- Class: Insecta
- Order: Odonata
- Suborder: Anisoptera
- Family: Gomphidae
- Genus: Austrogomphus
- Subgenus: Austrogomphus
- Species: A. pusillus

Binomial name
- Austrogomphus pusillus Sjöstedt, 1917

Species of dragonfly

Austrogomphus pusillus, also known as Austrogomphus (Austrogomphus) pusillus, is a species of dragonfly of the family Gomphidae, commonly known as the tiny hunter. It is only known from one location, inhabiting a river in the Kimberley region, Western Australia.

Austrogomphus pusillus is a tiny, black and yellow dragonfly.

== Etymology ==
The genus name Austrogomphus combines the prefix austro- (from Latin auster, meaning “south wind”, hence “southern”) with Gomphus, a genus name derived from Greek γόμφος (gomphos, “peg” or “nail”), alluding to the clubbed shape of the abdomen in males.

In 1917, Sjöstedt named this species pusillus, Latin for "very small", referring to the small size of the gomphids in this area.

== See also ==
- List of Odonata species of Australia
