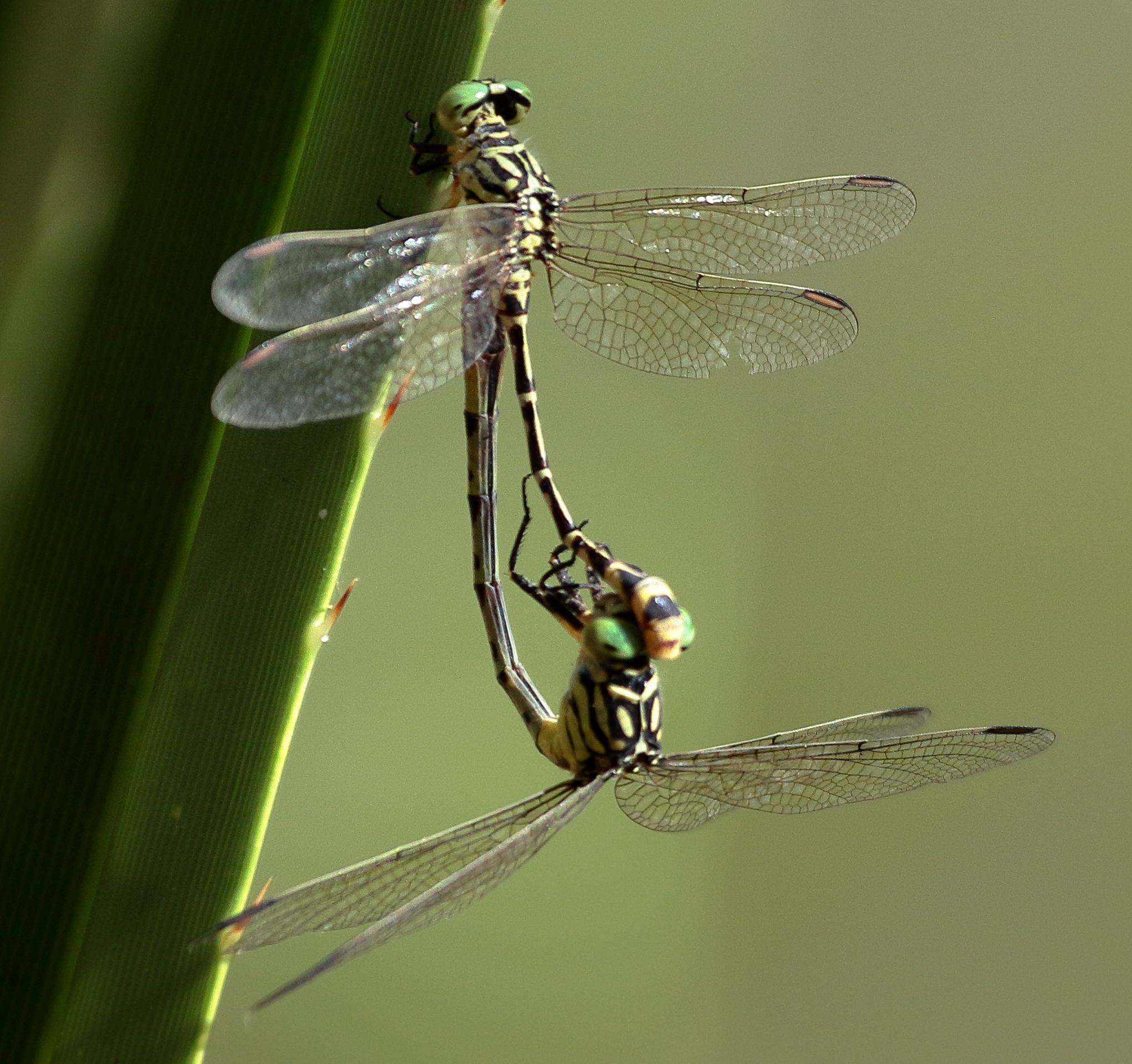
- Mating pair Gregory River, Queensland

Conservation status
- Least Concern (IUCN 3.1)

Scientific classification
- Kingdom: Animalia
- Phylum: Arthropoda
- Clade: Pancrustacea
- Class: Insecta
- Order: Odonata
- Suborder: Anisoptera
- Family: Gomphidae
- Genus: Austrogomphus
- Subgenus: Austrogomphus
- Species: A. mjobergi

Binomial name
- Austrogomphus mjobergi Sjöstedt, 1917

= Austrogomphus mjobergi =

Pimple-headed hunter

Species of dragonfly

Austrogomphus mjobergi, also known as Austrogomphus (Austrogomphus) mjobergi, is a species of dragonfly of the family Gomphidae, commonly known as the pimple-headed hunter. It inhabits rivers and pools across northern Australia.

Austrogomphus mjobergi is a very small, black and yellow dragonfly.

== Etymology ==
The genus name Austrogomphus combines the prefix austro- (from Latin auster, meaning “south wind”, hence “southern”) with Gomphus, a genus name derived from Greek γόμφος (gomphos, “peg” or “nail”), alluding to the clubbed shape of the abdomen in males.

In 1917, Sjöstedt named this species mjobergi, an eponym honouring Eric Mjöberg (1882-1938), a Swedish zoologist and ethnographer who led early Swedish scientific expeditions to Australia.

== Gallery ==
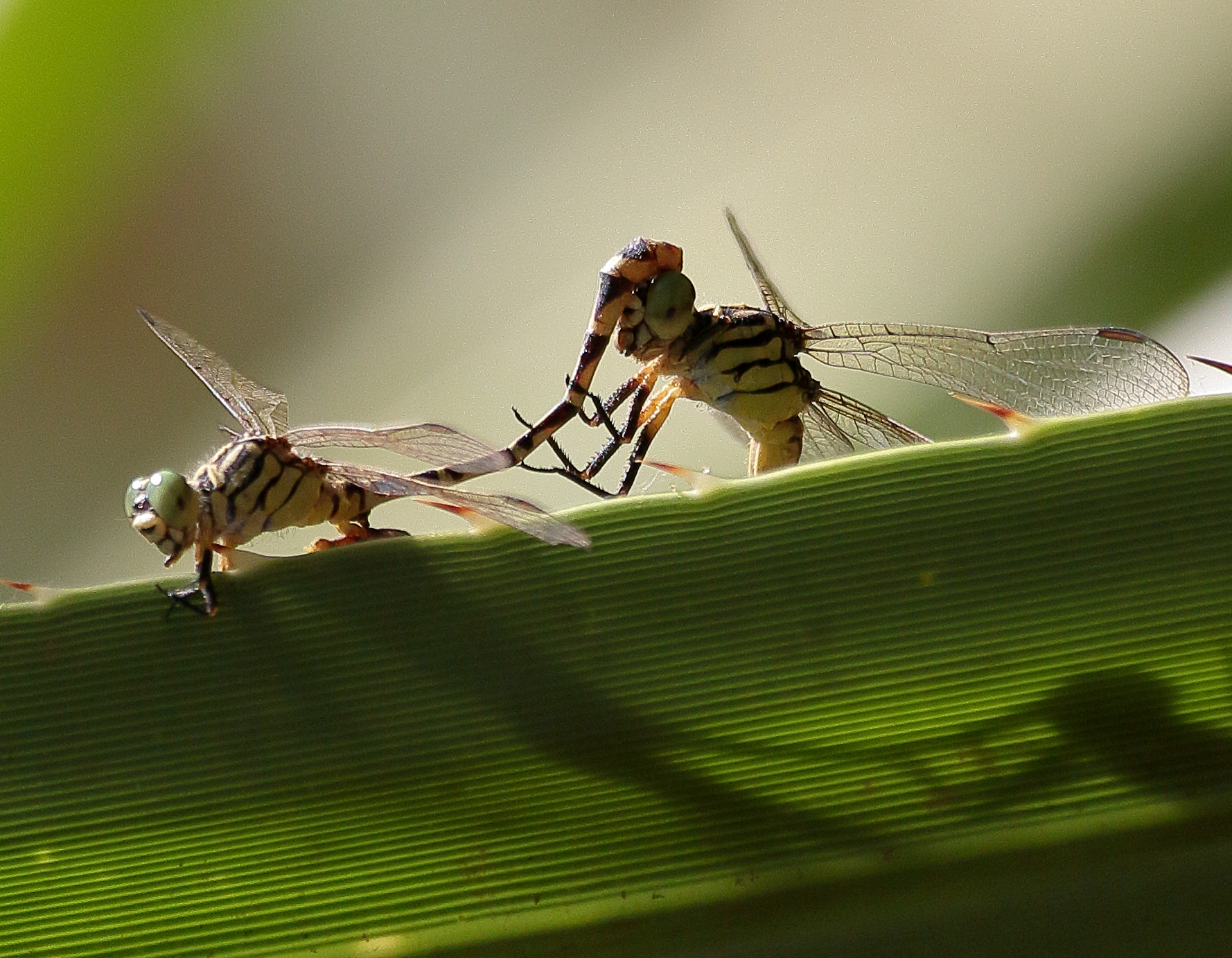
Mating pair (image rotated 90 deg) male on the left.

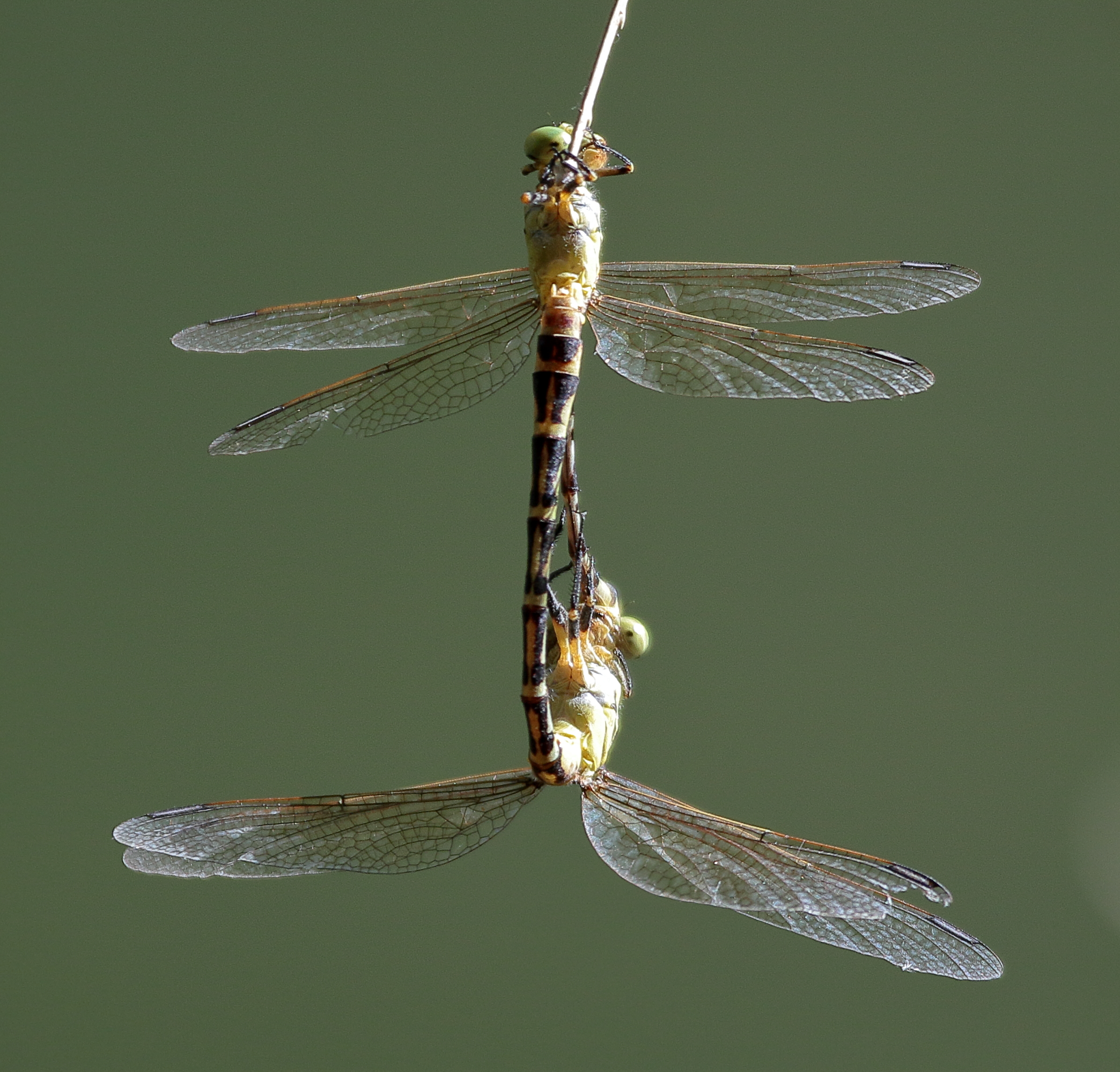
View of surface patterns on female abdomen and underside of male.

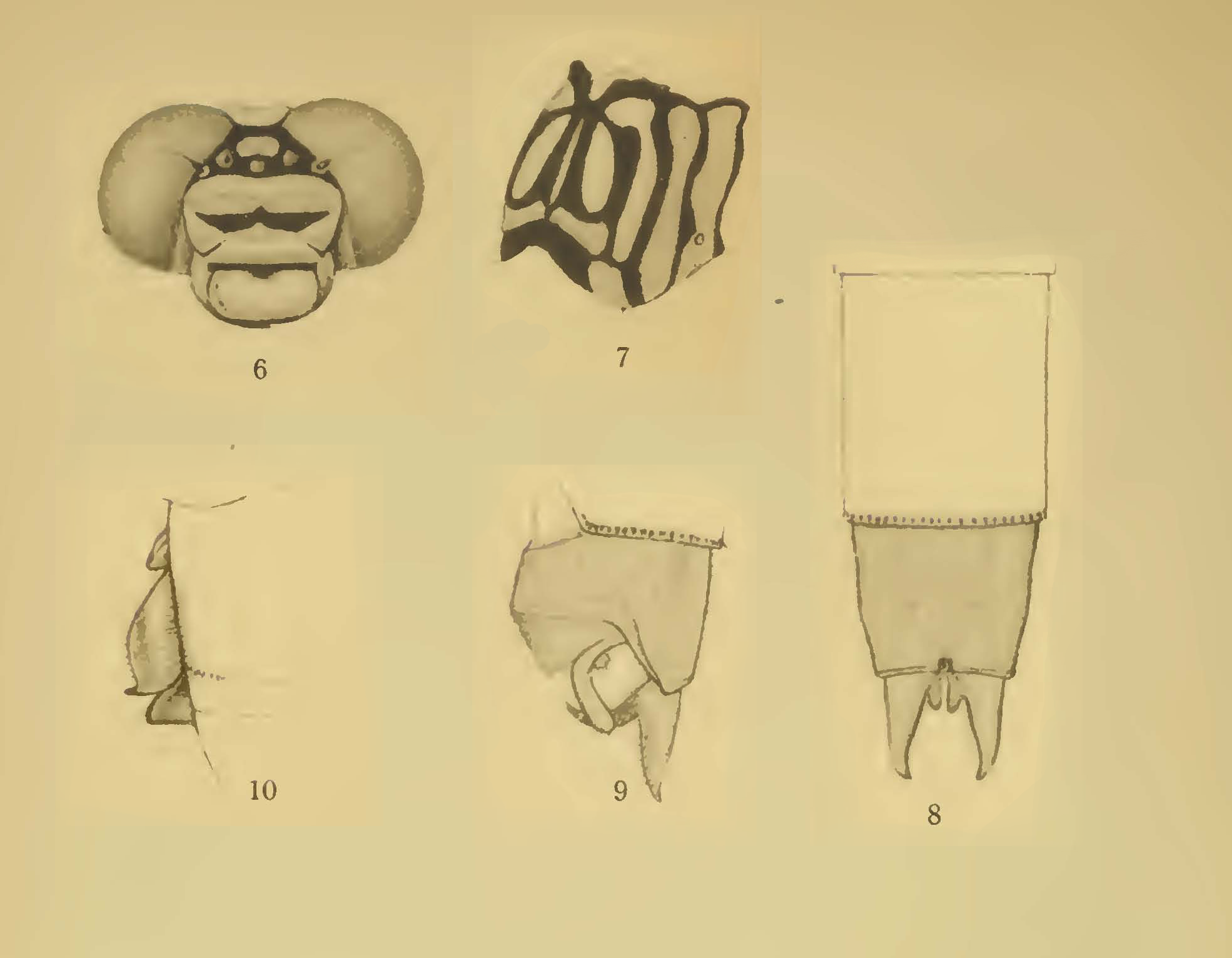
Original illustrations 6.Face 7.Thorax 8,9.Male tail tip 10.Male genitalia

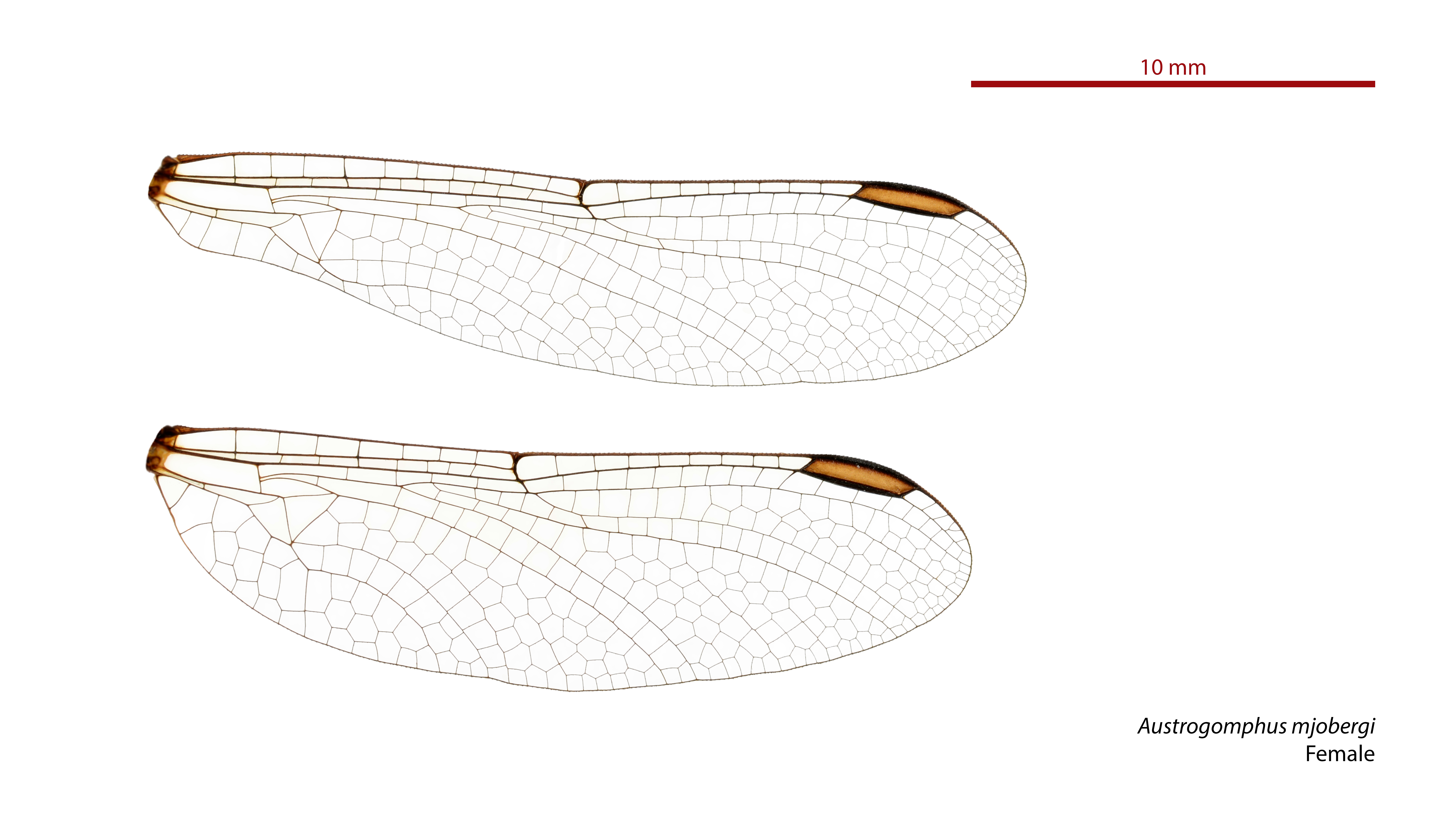
Female wings

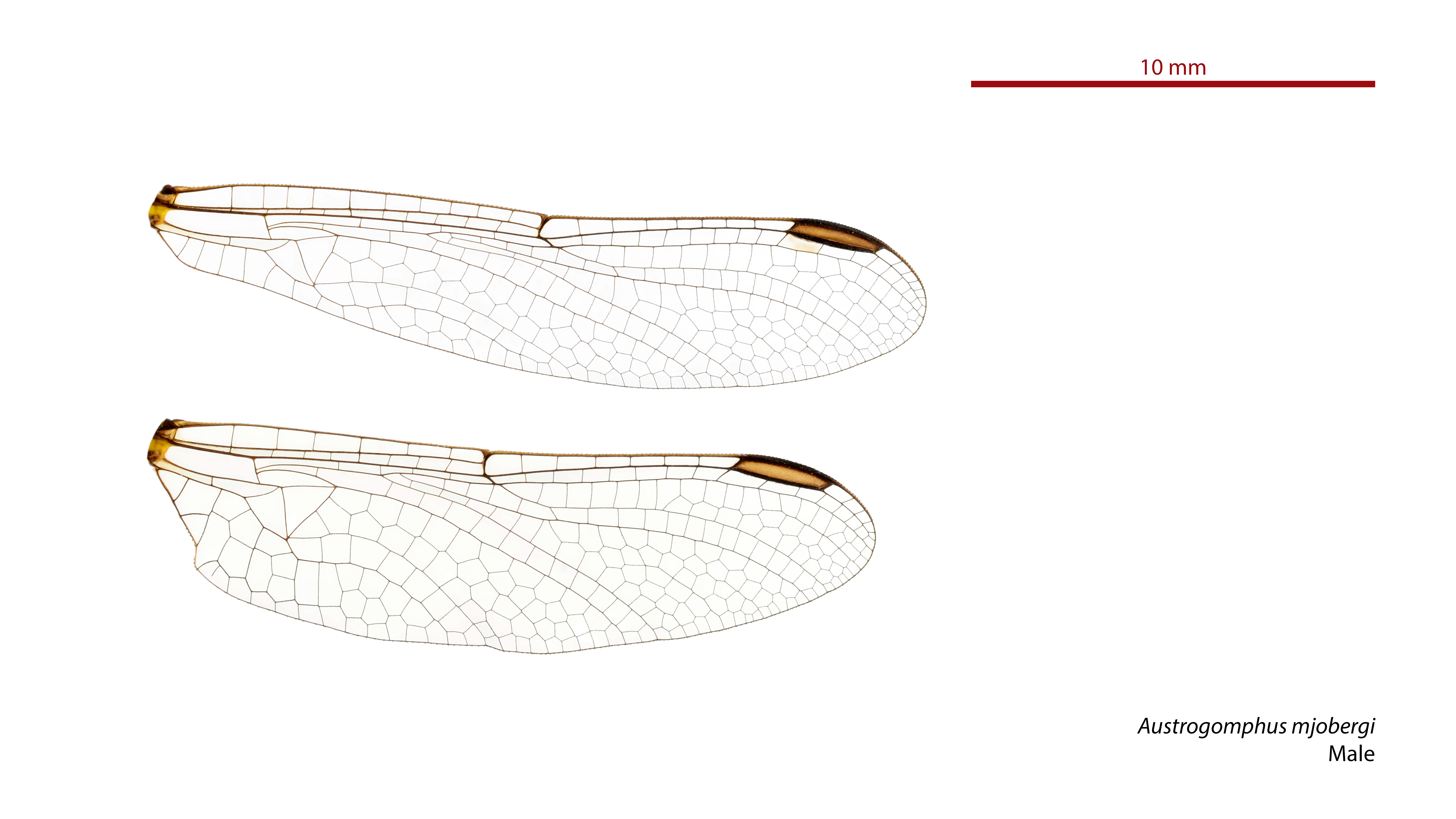
Male wings

== See also ==
- List of Odonata species of Australia
