= Unicorn hunter =

Unicorn hunter may refer to:

- Austrogomphus cornutus, a species of dragonfly, commonly known as the unicorn hunter
- Unicorn hunting, the practice of seeking a third partner for a heterosexual relationship
- Unicorn Hunters, a 2021 reality television series on investing
