= Austrogomphus angelorum =

Murray River hunter

Conservation status
- Vulnerable (IUCN 3.1)

Scientific classification
- Kingdom: Animalia
- Phylum: Arthropoda
- Clade: Pancrustacea
- Class: Insecta
- Order: Odonata
- Suborder: Anisoptera
- Family: Gomphidae
- Genus: Austrogomphus
- Subgenus: Austrogomphus
- Species: A. angelorum

Binomial name
- Austrogomphus angelorum Tillyard, 1913

Species of dragonfly

Austrogomphus angelorum, also known as Austrogomphus (Austrogomphus) angelorum, and originally named as Austrogomphus angeli, is a species of dragonfly of the family Gomphidae, commonly known as the Murray River hunter. It inhabits slow-flowing parts of the Murray River in South Australia and on the border of New South Wales and Victoria.

Austrogomphus angelorum is a tiny to medium-sized, black and yellow dragonfly.

== Etymology ==
The genus name Austrogomphus combines the prefix austro- (from Latin auster, meaning “south wind”, hence “southern”) with Gomphus, a genus name derived from Greek γόμφος (gomphos, “peg” or “nail”), alluding to the clubbed shape of the abdomen in males. The name refers to a southern representative of that group.

The species name angelorum is an eponym honouring the brothers Frank Milton Angel and Sydney Angel, who collected the original specimens. In 1913, Tillyard originally named the species angeli, which was later amended to angelorum to reflect that it honoured two people.

== Gallery ==
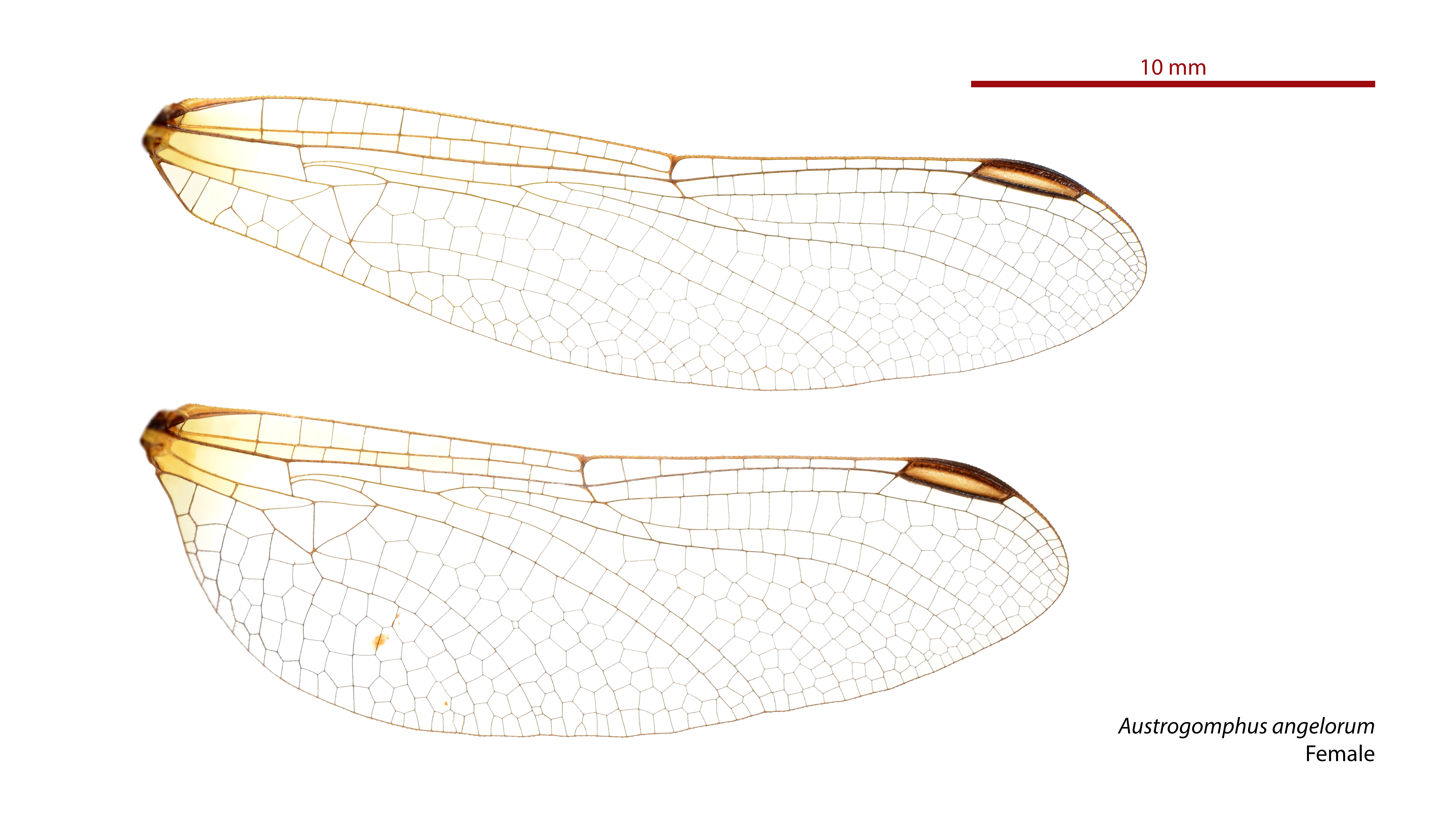
Female wings

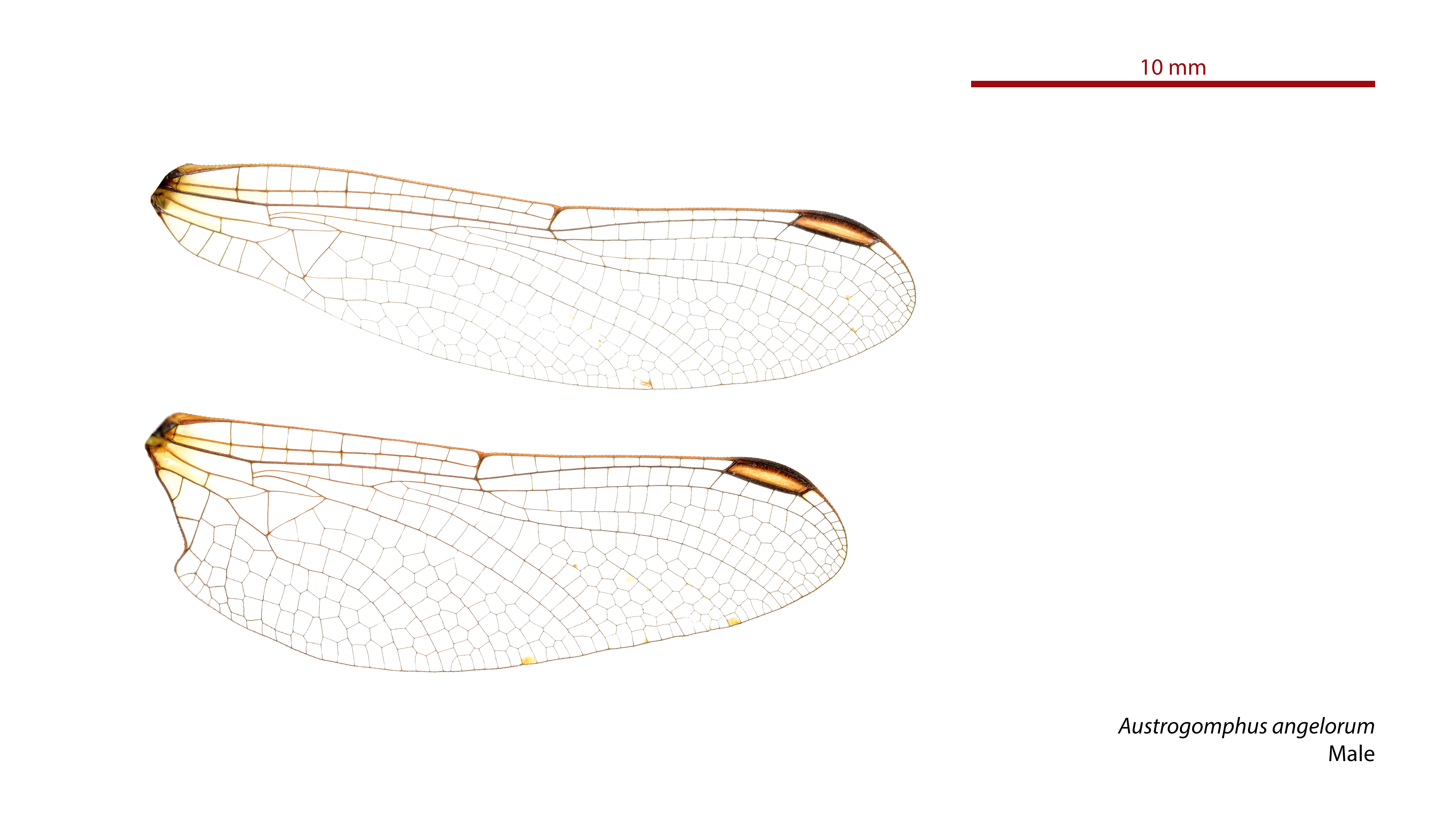
Male wings

== See also ==
- List of Odonata species of Australia
