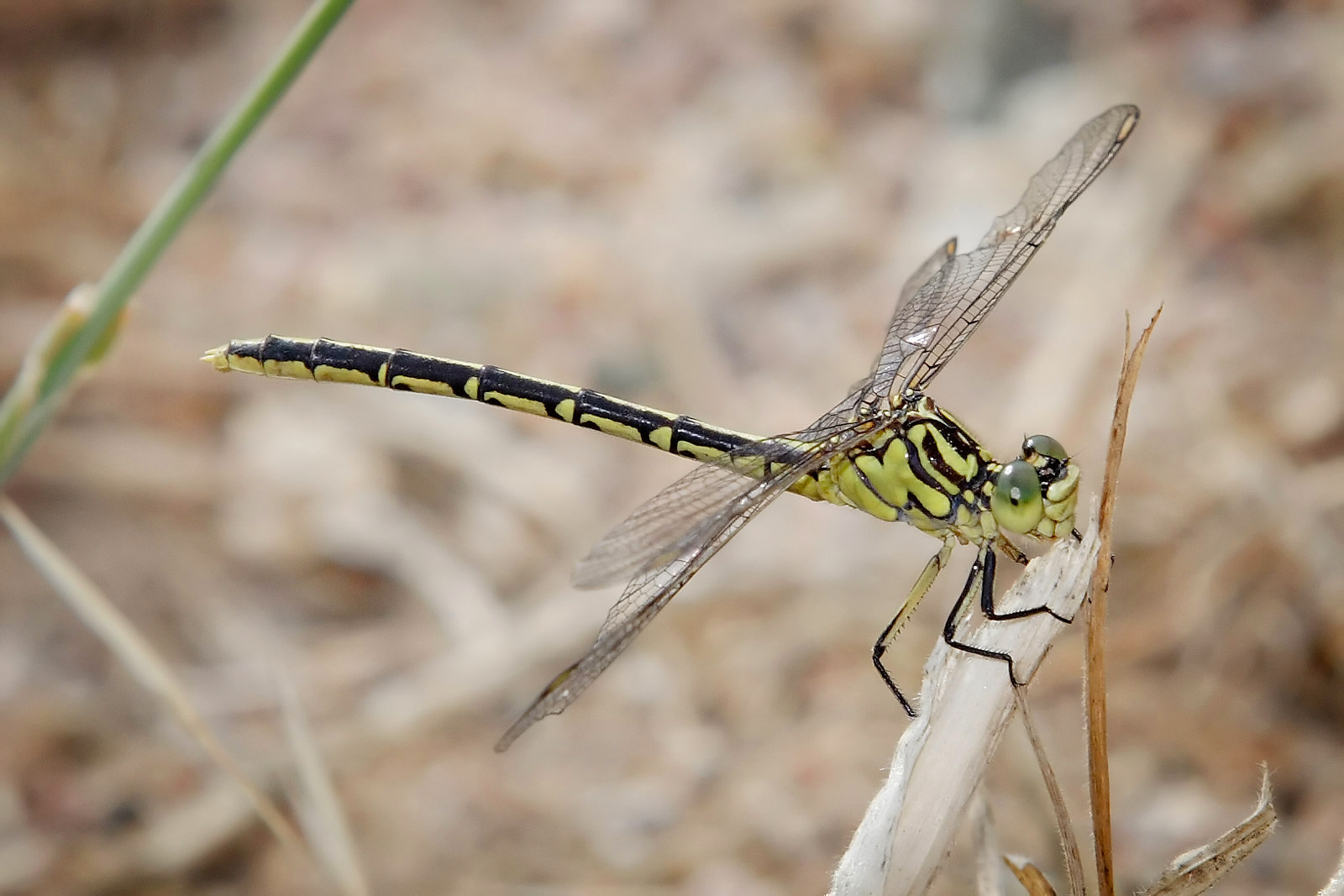
- Austrogomphus guerini

Scientific classification
- Kingdom: Animalia
- Phylum: Arthropoda
- Clade: Pancrustacea
- Class: Insecta
- Order: Odonata
- Suborder: Anisoptera
- Family: Gomphidae
- Genus: Austrogomphus; Selys, 1854

Subgenera
- Austrogomphus (Austrogomphus) Selys, 1854; Austrogomphus (Pleiogomphus) Watson, 1991

= Austrogomphus =

Genus of dragonflies

Austrogomphus is a genus of dragonflies in the family Gomphidae, endemic to Australia. Species of Austrogomphus are tiny to medium-sized dragonflies, black in colour with yellowish markings. They are commonly known as hunters.

== Species ==
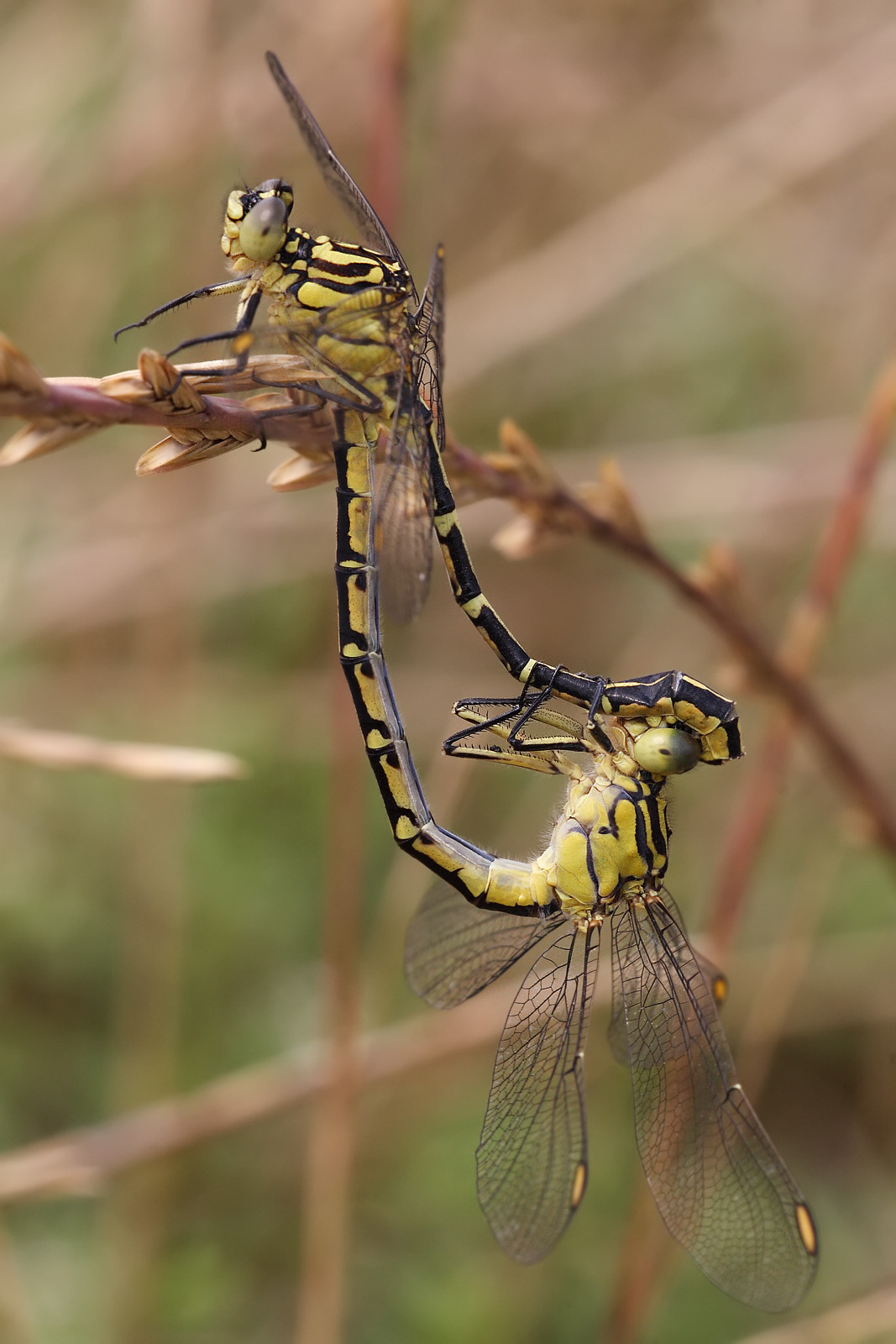
Pair of Austrogomphus guerini mating

The genus Austrogomphus includes the following species in two subgenera:

Subgenus Austrogomphus

- Austrogomphus angelorum Tillyard, 1913 - Murray River hunter
- Austrogomphus arbustorum Tillyard, 1906 - toothed hunter
- Austrogomphus australis Dale in Selys, 1854 - inland hunter
- Austrogomphus collaris Hagen in Selys, 1854 - western inland hunter
- Austrogomphus cornutus Watson, 1991 - unicorn hunter
- Austrogomphus doddi Tillyard, 1909 - northern river hunter
- Austrogomphus guerini (Rambur, 1842) - yellow-striped hunter
- Austrogomphus mjobergi Sjöstedt, 1917 - pimple-headed hunter
- Austrogomphus mouldsorum Theischinger, 1999 - Kimberley hunter
- Austrogomphus ochraceus (Selys, 1869) - jade hunter
- Austrogomphus pusillus Sjöstedt, 1917 - tiny hunter

Subgenus Pleiogomphus

- Austrogomphus (Pleiogomphus) amphiclitus (Selys, 1873) - pale hunter
- Austrogomphus (Pleiogomphus) bifurcatus Tillyard, 1909 - dark hunter
- Austrogomphus (Pleiogomphus) divaricatus Watson, 1991 - fork hunter
- Austrogomphus (Pleiogomphus) prasinus Tillyard, 1906 - lemon-tipped hunter

Recently the following species were moved from the genus Austrogomphus to Austroepigomphus:

- Austroepigomphus praeruptus (Selys, 1857) - twinspot hunter
- Austroepigomphus gordoni Watson, 1962 - western red hunter
- Austroepigomphus turneri Martin, 1901 - flame-tipped hunter

== Etymology ==
The genus name Austrogomphus combines the prefix austro- (from Latin auster, meaning “south wind”, hence “southern”) with Gomphus, a genus name derived from Greek γόμφος (gomphos, “peg” or “nail”), alluding to the clubbed shape of the abdomen in males. The name refers to a southern representative of that group.

== See also ==
- List of Odonata species of Australia
