= Austrogomphus mouldsorum =

Kimberley hunter

Conservation status
- Data Deficient (IUCN 3.1)

Scientific classification
- Kingdom: Animalia
- Phylum: Arthropoda
- Clade: Pancrustacea
- Class: Insecta
- Order: Odonata
- Suborder: Anisoptera
- Family: Gomphidae
- Genus: Austrogomphus
- Subgenus: Austrogomphus
- Species: A. mouldsorum

Binomial name
- Austrogomphus mouldsorum Theischinger, 1999

Species of dragonfly

Austrogomphus mouldsorum, also known as Austrogomphus (Austrogomphus) mouldsorum, is a species of dragonfly of the family Gomphidae, commonly known as the Kimberley hunter. It is only known from one location, in the Kimberley region of Western Australia.

Austrogomphus mouldsorum is a medium-sized, black and yellow dragonfly.

== Etymology ==
The genus name Austrogomphus combines the prefix austro- (from Latin auster, meaning “south wind”, hence “southern”) with Gomphus, a genus name derived from Greek γόμφος (gomphos, “peg” or “nail”), alluding to the clubbed shape of the abdomen in males.

In 1999, Theischinger named this species mouldsorum, an eponym honouring the collectors Max Moulds and Barbara J. Moulds.

== Gallery ==
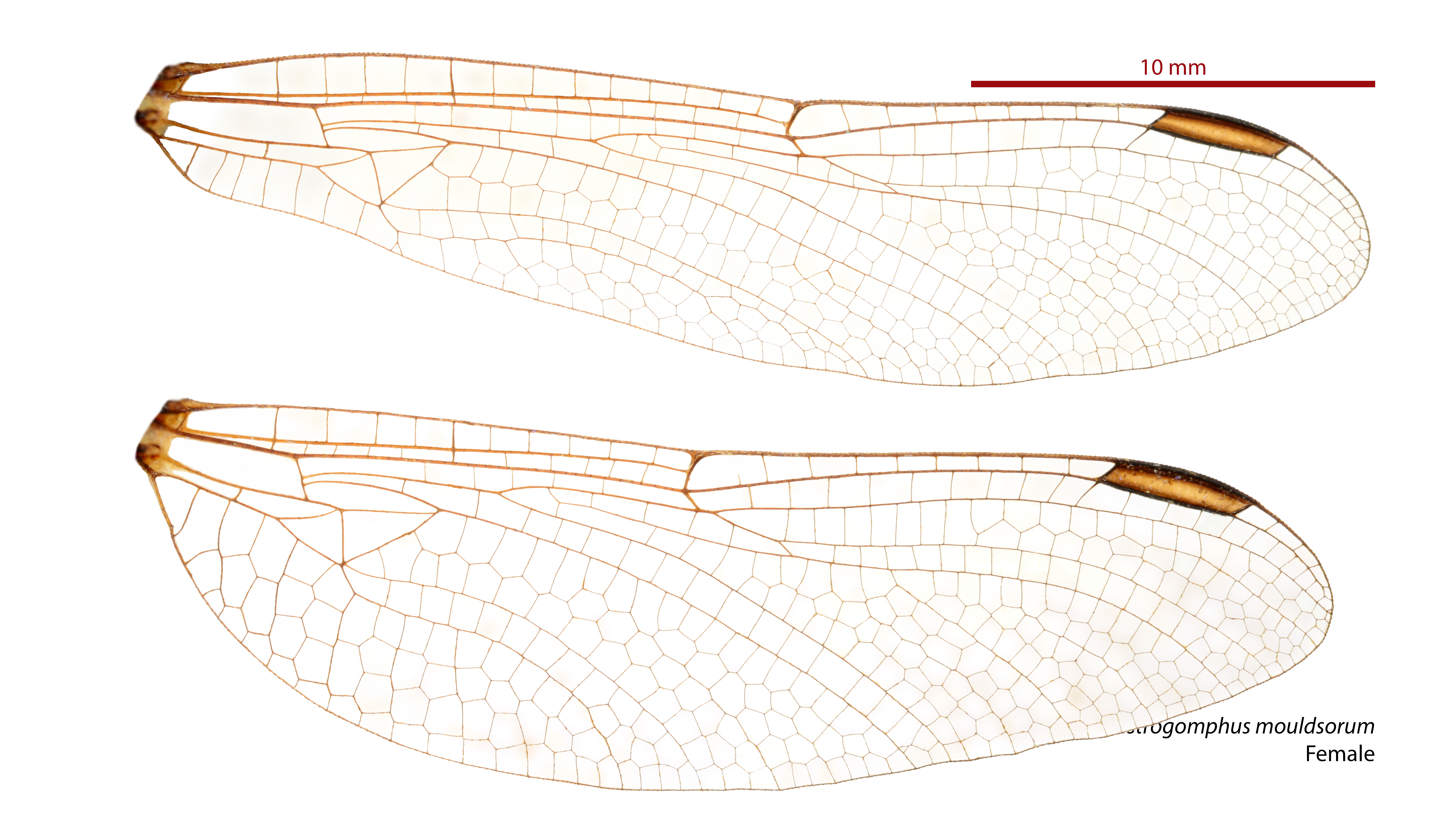
Female wings

== See also ==
- List of Odonata species of Australia
