= Austrogomphus collaris =

Western inland hunter

Conservation status
- Least Concern (IUCN 3.1)

Scientific classification
- Kingdom: Animalia
- Phylum: Arthropoda
- Clade: Pancrustacea
- Class: Insecta
- Order: Odonata
- Suborder: Anisoptera
- Family: Gomphidae
- Genus: Austrogomphus
- Subgenus: Austrogomphus
- Species: A. collaris

Binomial name
- Austrogomphus collaris Hagen, 1854

Species of dragonfly

Austrogomphus collaris, also known as Austrogomphus (Austrogomphus) collaris, is a species of dragonfly of the family Gomphidae, commonly known as the western inland hunter. It inhabits streams, rivers and pools in south-western Australia.

Austrogomphus collaris is a tiny to medium-sized, black and yellow dragonfly.

== Etymology ==
The genus name Austrogomphus combines the prefix austro- (from Latin auster, meaning “south wind”, hence “southern”) with Gomphus, a genus name derived from Greek γόμφος (gomphos, “peg” or “nail”), alluding to the clubbed shape of the abdomen in males.

The species name collaris is Latin for "pertaining to the neck", likely referring to a tooth on the rear of the female head.

== Gallery ==
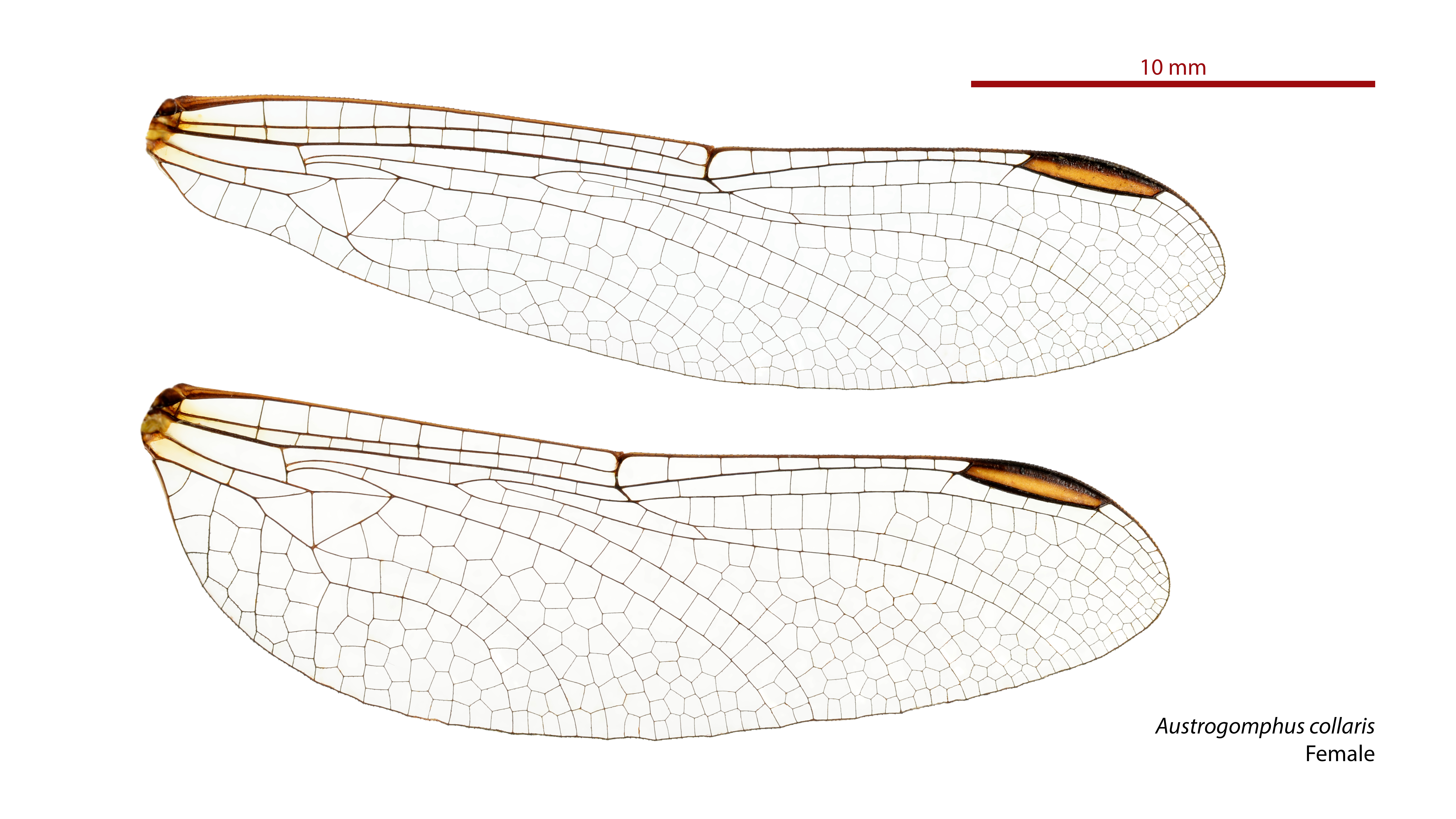
Female wings

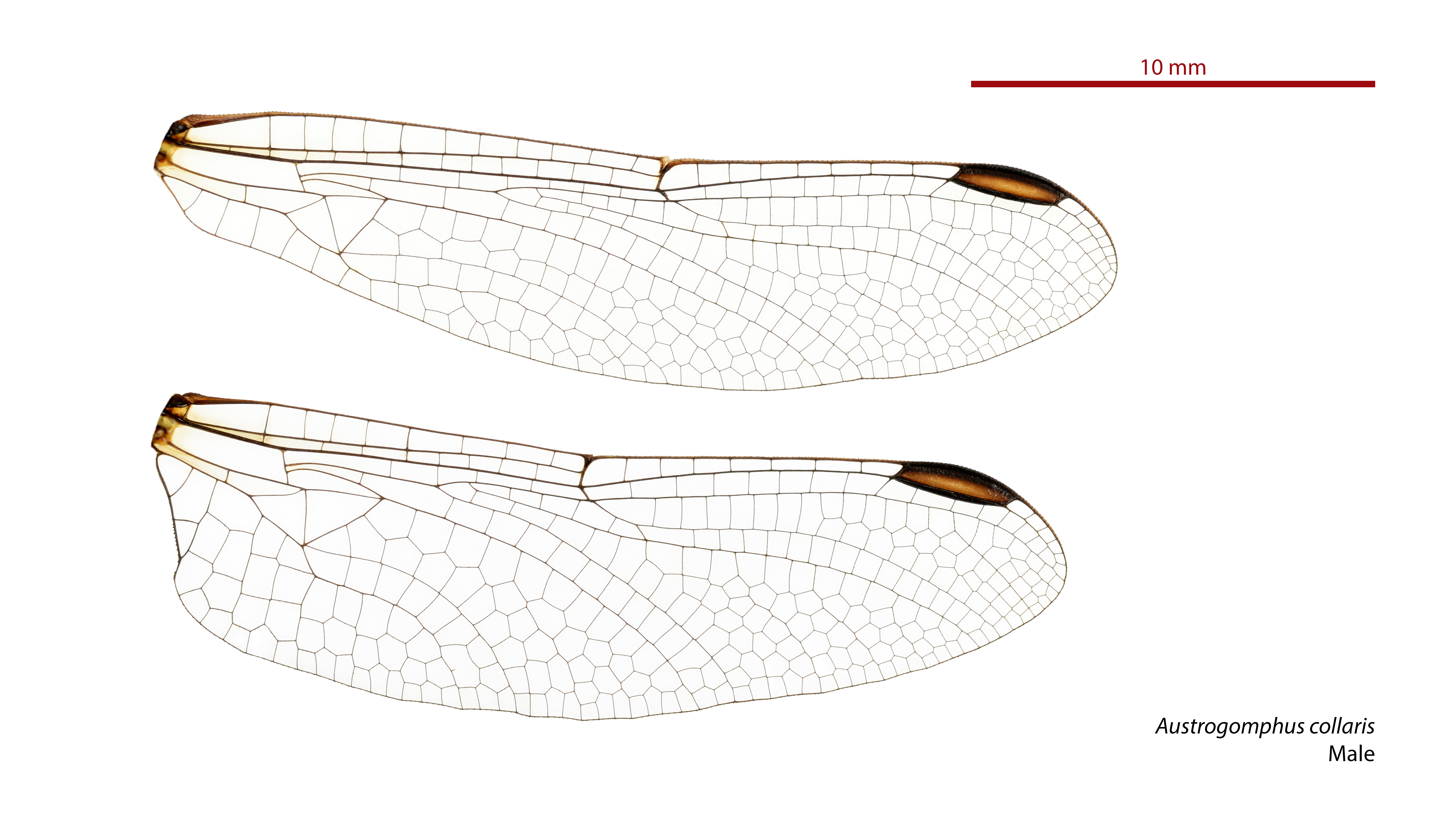
Male wings

== See also ==
- List of Odonata species of Australia
