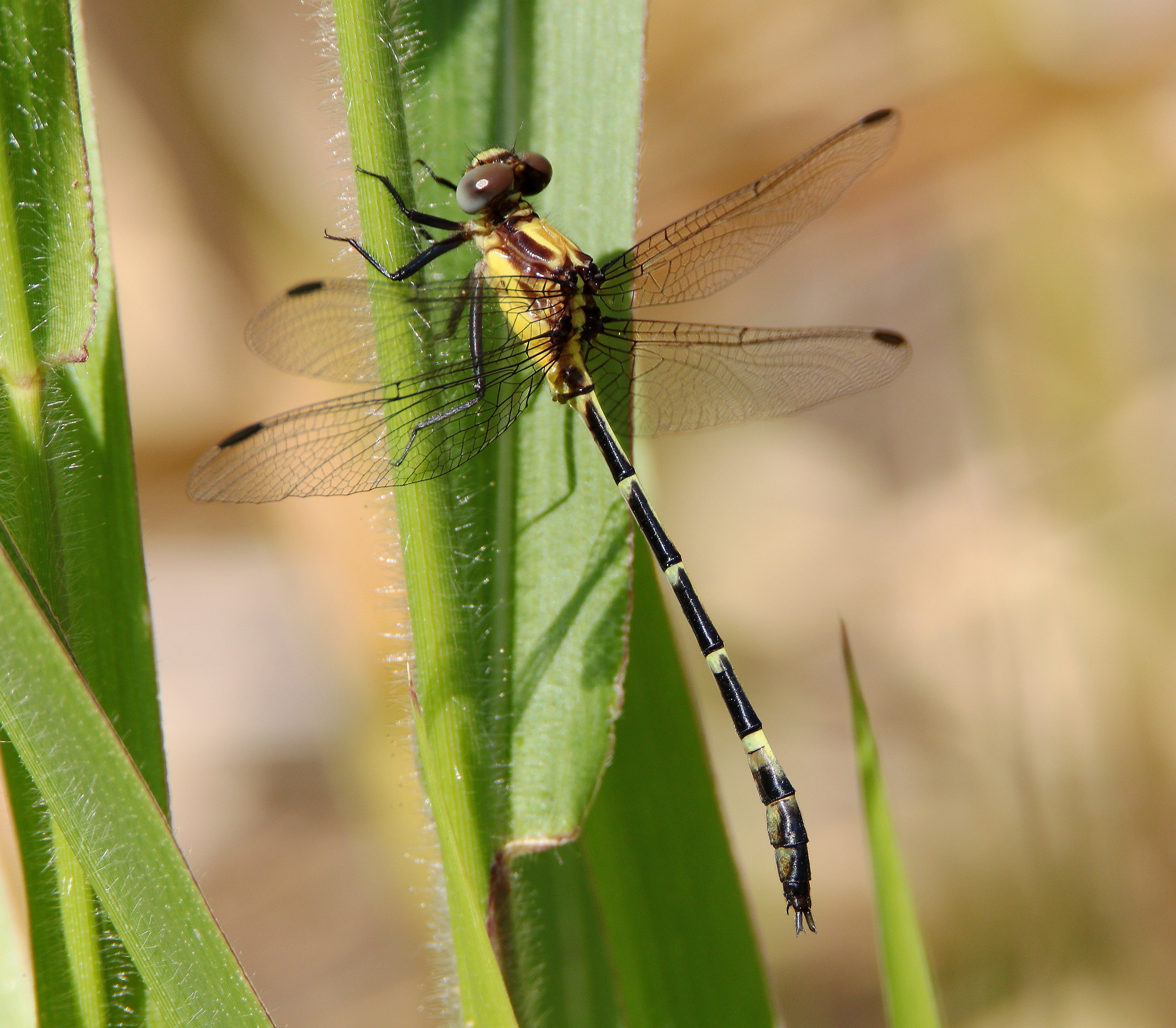
- Male, Queensland

Conservation status
- Near Threatened (IUCN 3.1)

Scientific classification
- Kingdom: Animalia
- Phylum: Arthropoda
- Clade: Pancrustacea
- Class: Insecta
- Order: Odonata
- Suborder: Anisoptera
- Family: Gomphidae
- Genus: Austrogomphus
- Subgenus: Pleiogomphus
- Species: A. divaricatus

Binomial name
- Austrogomphus divaricatus Watson, 1991

= Austrogomphus divaricatus =

Fork hunter

Species of dragonfly

Austrogomphus divaricatus, also known as Austrogomphus (Pleiogomphus) divaricatus, is a species of dragonfly of the family Gomphidae, commonly known as the fork hunter. It inhabits streams and rivers in northern Queensland, Australia.

Austrogomphus divaricatus is a medium-sized, black and yellow dragonfly.

== Etymology ==
The genus name Austrogomphus combines the prefix austro- (from Latin auster, meaning “south wind”, hence “southern”) with Gomphus, a genus name derived from Greek γόμφος (gomphos, “peg” or “nail”), alluding to the clubbed shape of the abdomen in males.

The species name divaricatus is Latin for "spread apart", referring to the male appendages and emphasising its similarity to Austrogomphus bifurcatus.

== Gallery ==
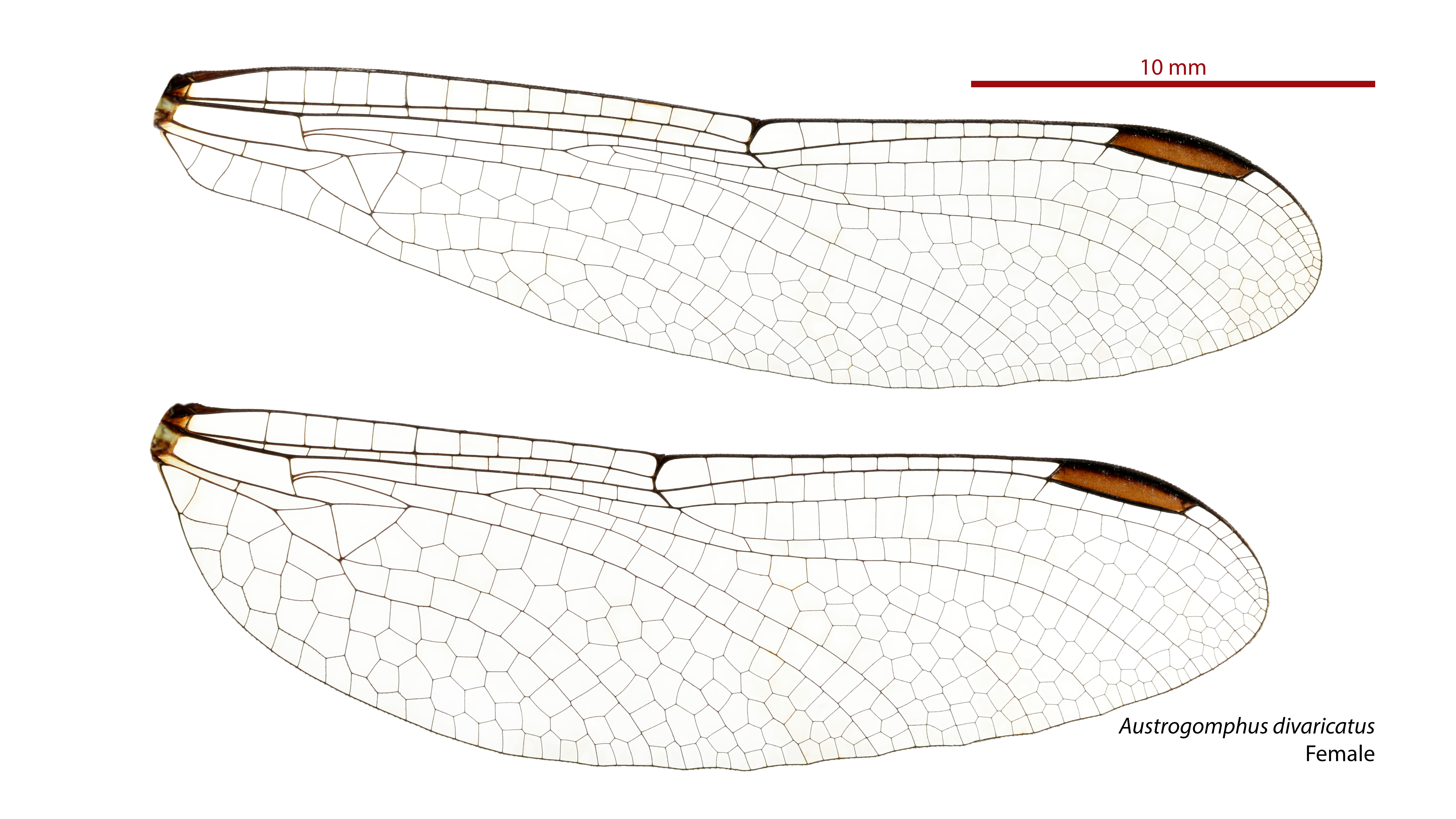
Female wings

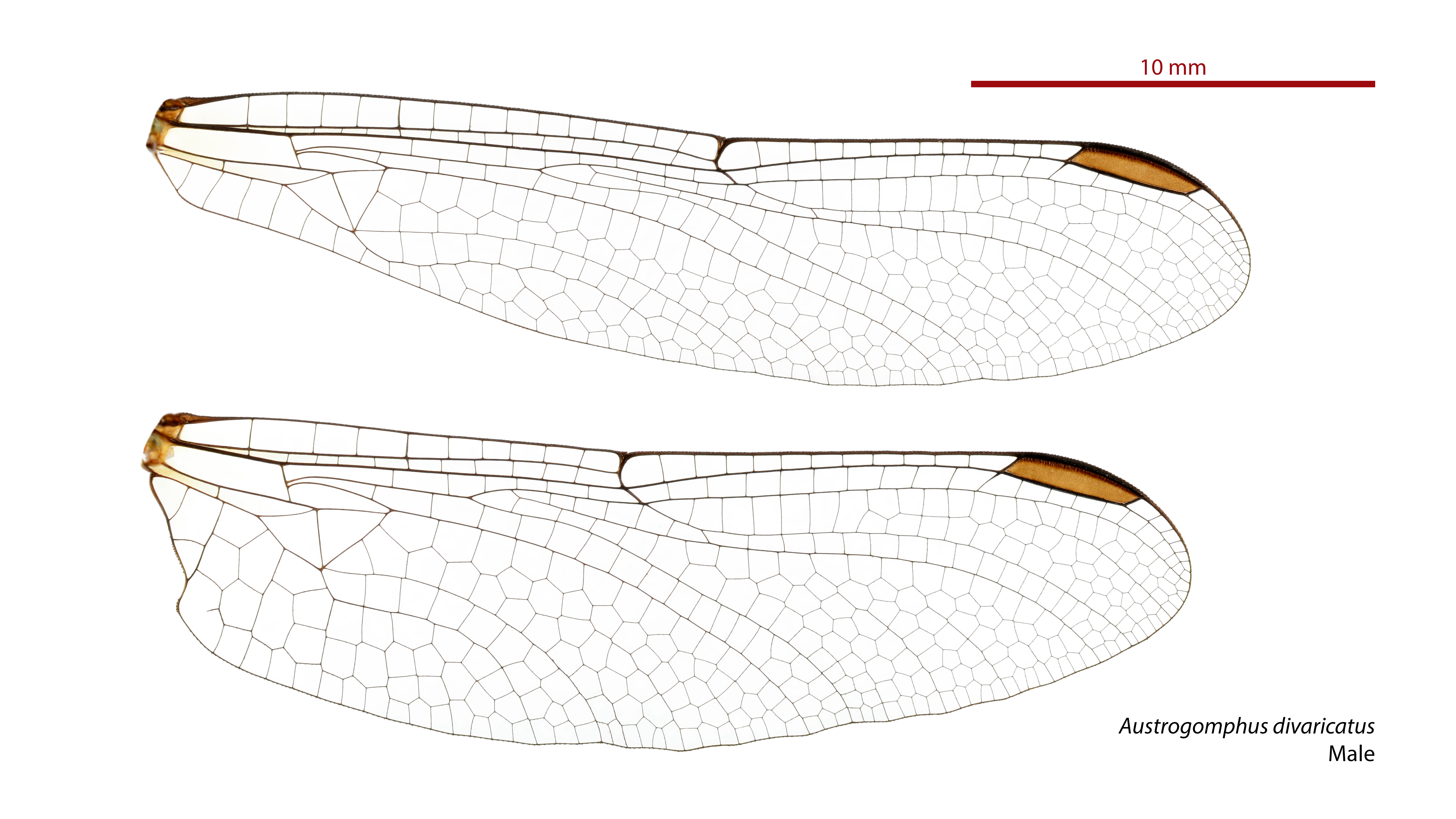
Male wings

== See also ==
- List of Odonata species of Australia
