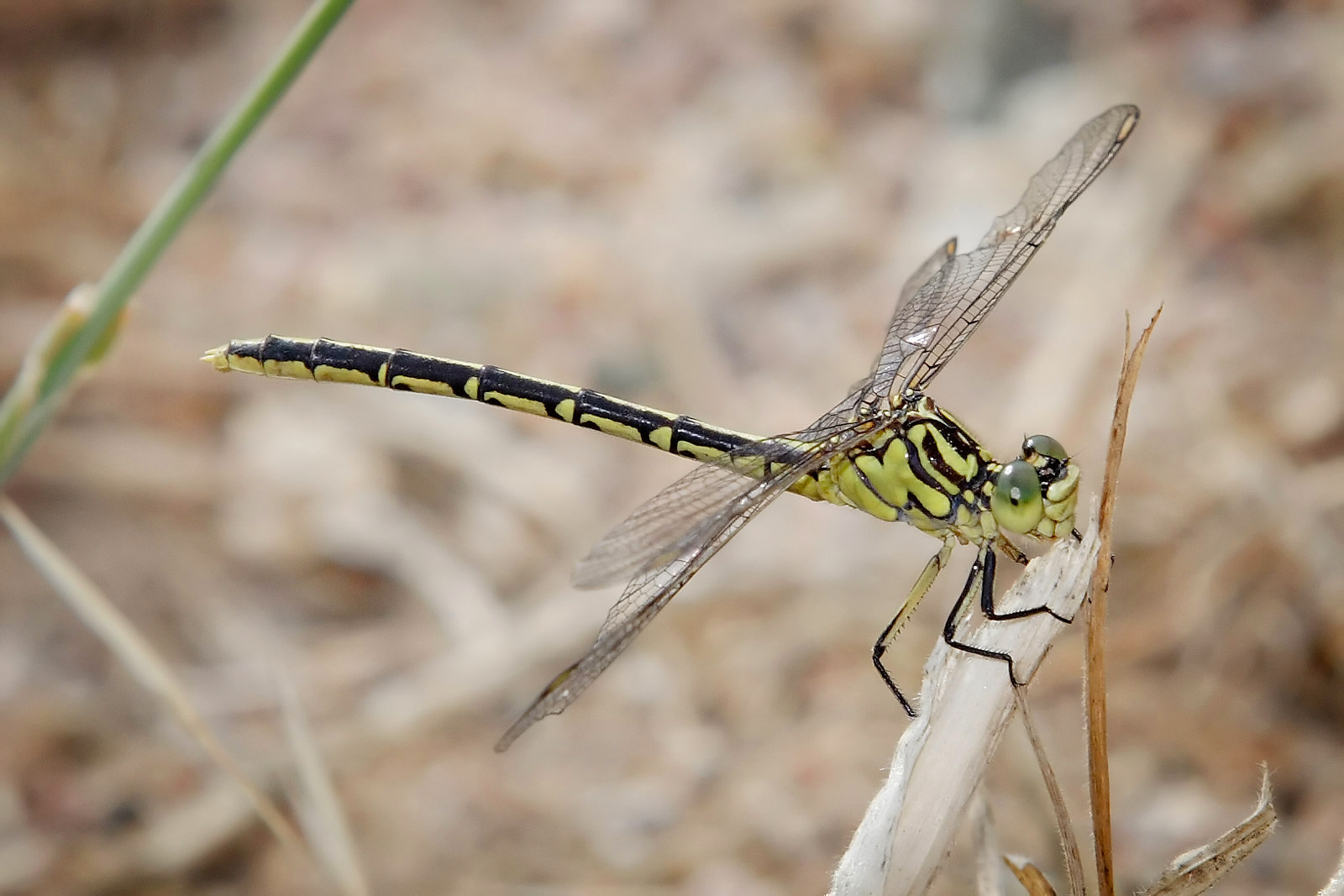
- Female
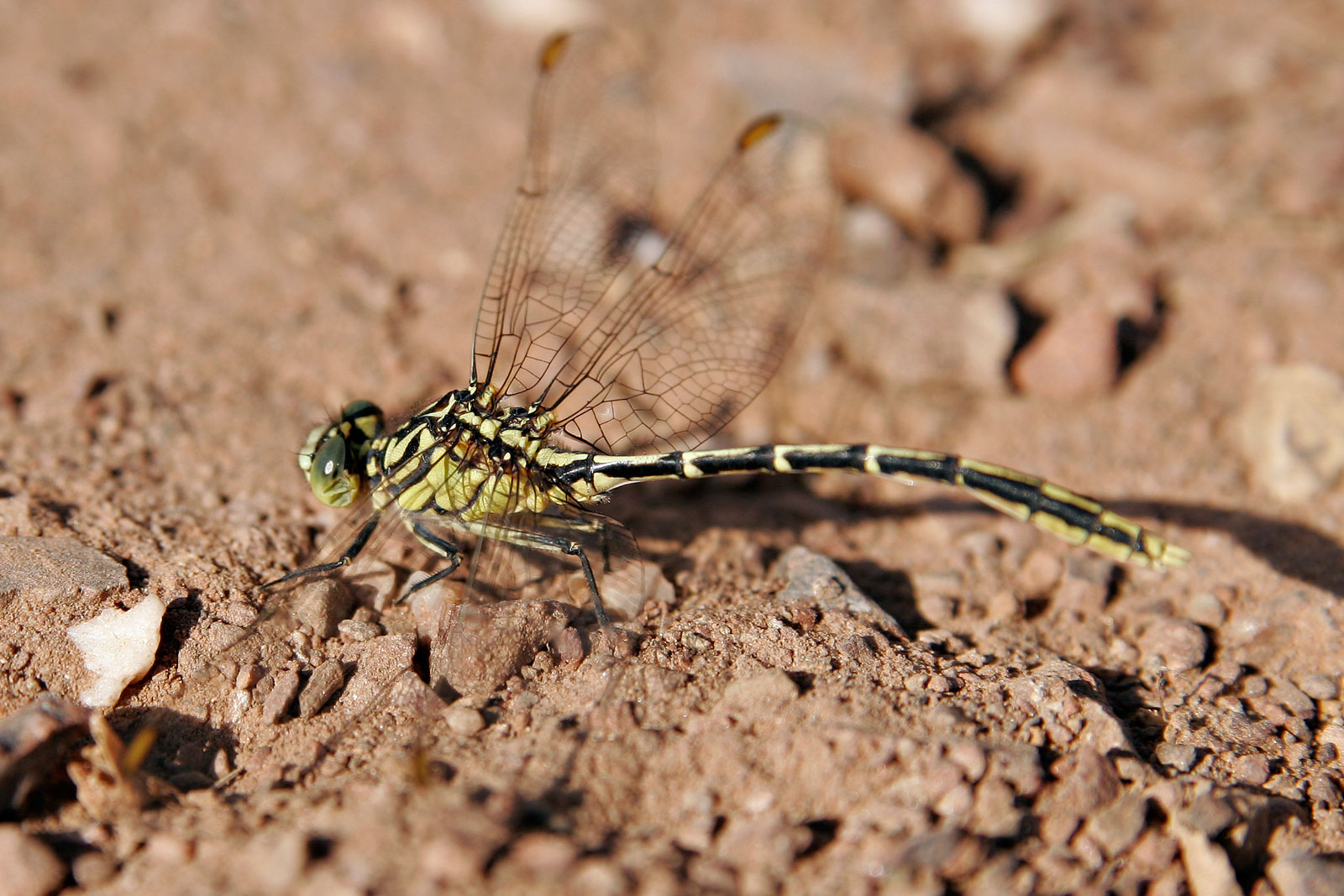
- Male

Conservation status
- Least Concern (IUCN 3.1)

Scientific classification
- Kingdom: Animalia
- Phylum: Arthropoda
- Clade: Pancrustacea
- Class: Insecta
- Order: Odonata
- Suborder: Anisoptera
- Family: Gomphidae
- Genus: Austrogomphus
- Subgenus: Austrogomphus
- Species: A. guerini

Binomial name
- Austrogomphus guerini (Rambur, 1842)

Synonyms
- Gomphus guerini Rambur, 1842

= Austrogomphus guerini =

Yellow-striped hunter

Species of dragonfly

Austrogomphus guerini, also known as Austrogomphus (Austrogomphus) guerini, is a species of dragonfly of the family Gomphidae, commonly known as the yellow-striped hunter. It inhabits streams, rivers and lakes in eastern New South Wales, Victoria and Tasmania, Australia.

Austrogomphus guerini is a tiny to medium-sized, black and yellow dragonfly.

== Etymology ==
The genus name Austrogomphus combines the prefix austro- (from Latin auster, meaning “south wind”, hence “southern”) with Gomphus, a genus name derived from Greek γόμφος (gomphos, “peg” or “nail”), alluding to the clubbed shape of the abdomen in males.

The species name guerini is likely an eponym honouring Félix Édouard Guérin-Méneville (1799-1874), who provided Rambur with dragonfly specimens collected by J.S.C. Dumont d’Urville during the voyage of the Coquille.

== Gallery ==
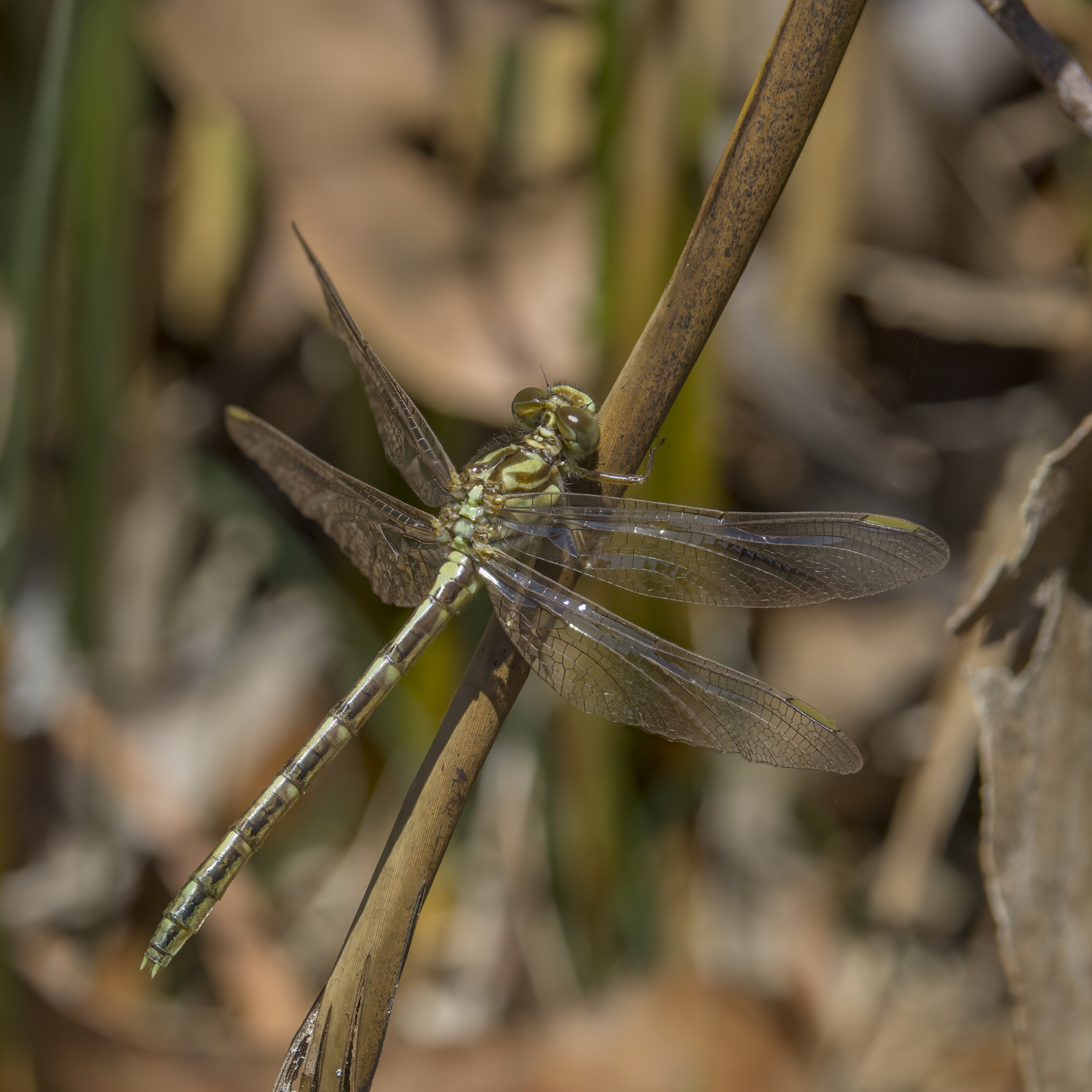
Teneral male

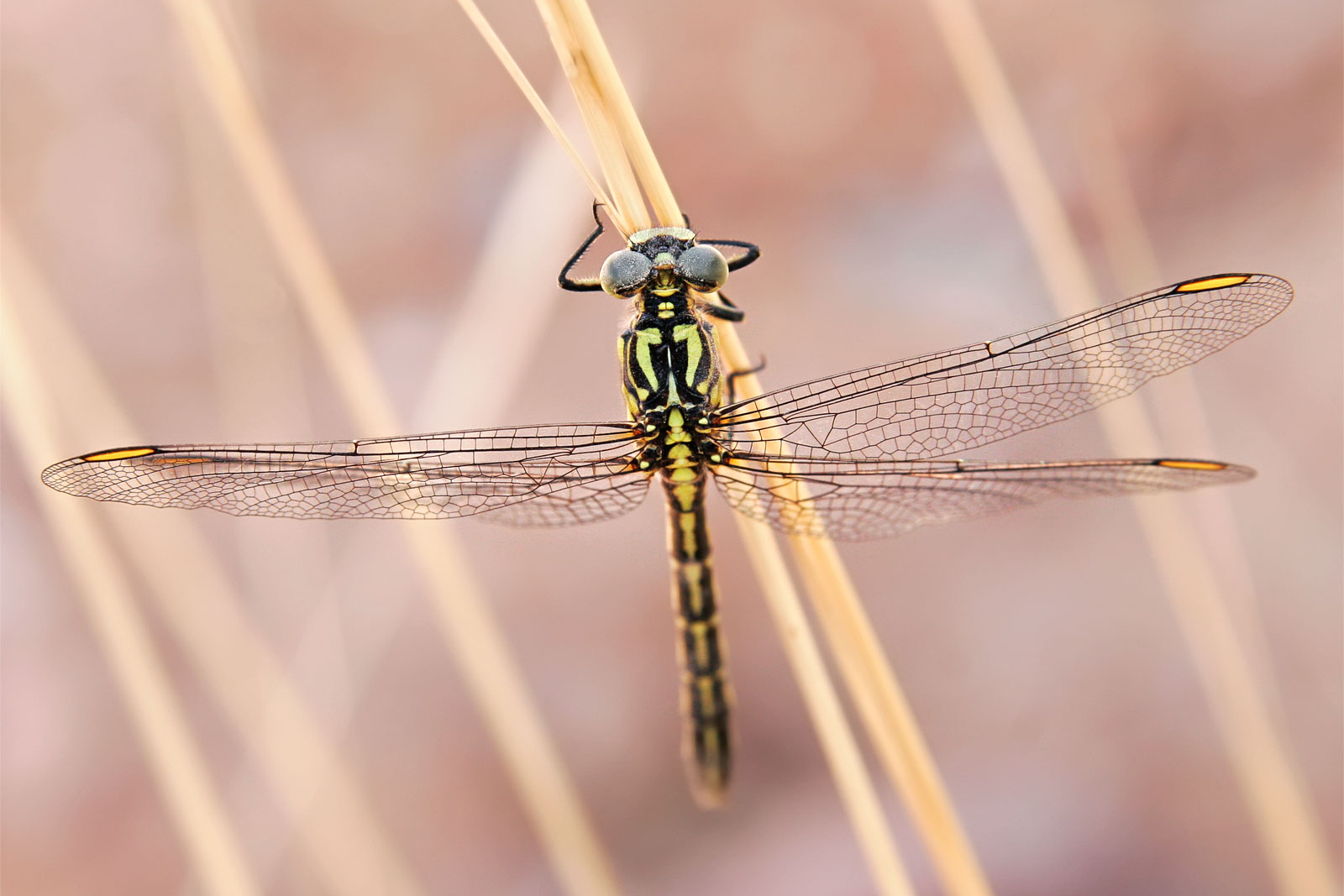
Female dorsal view

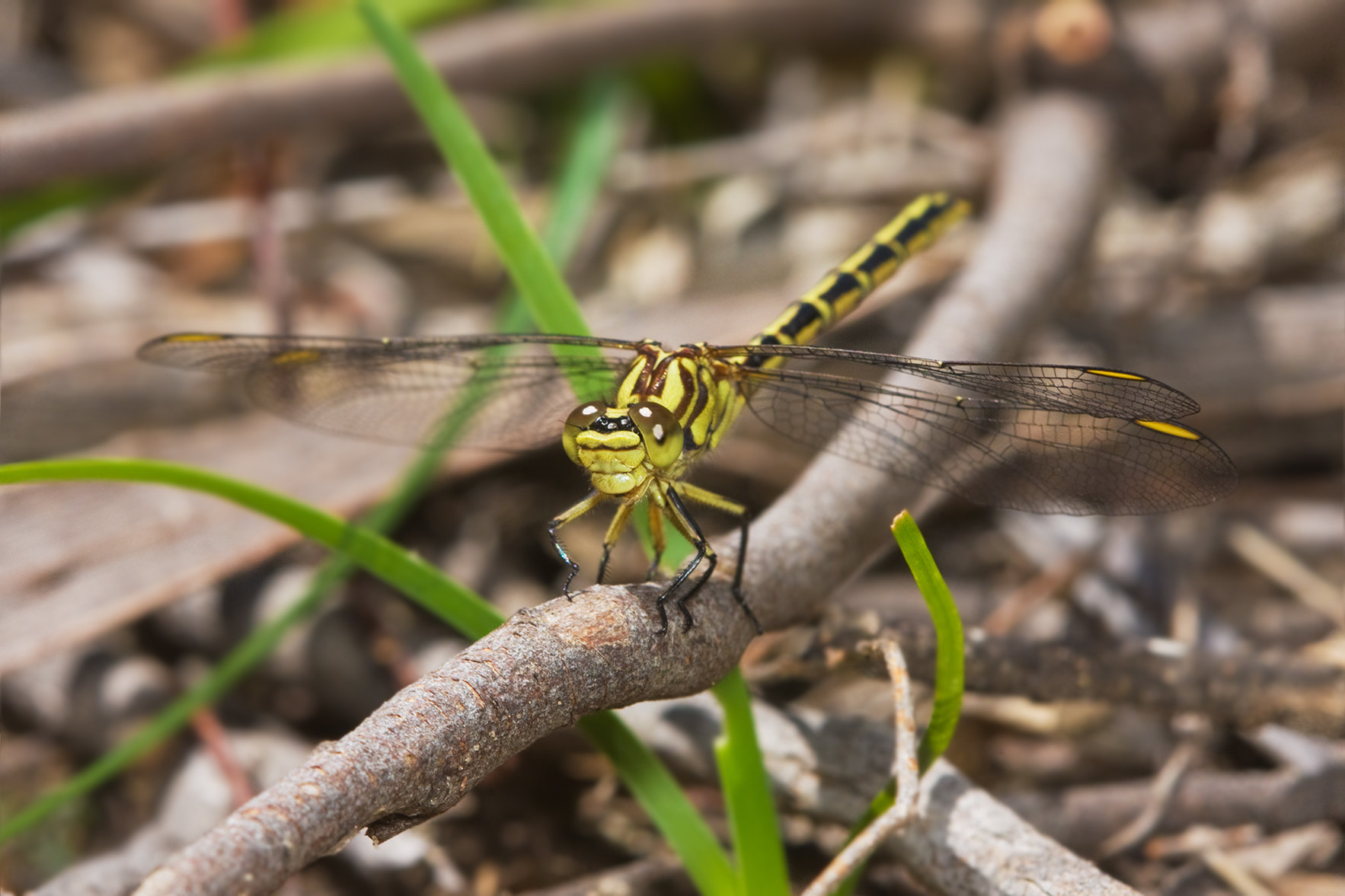
Female face on

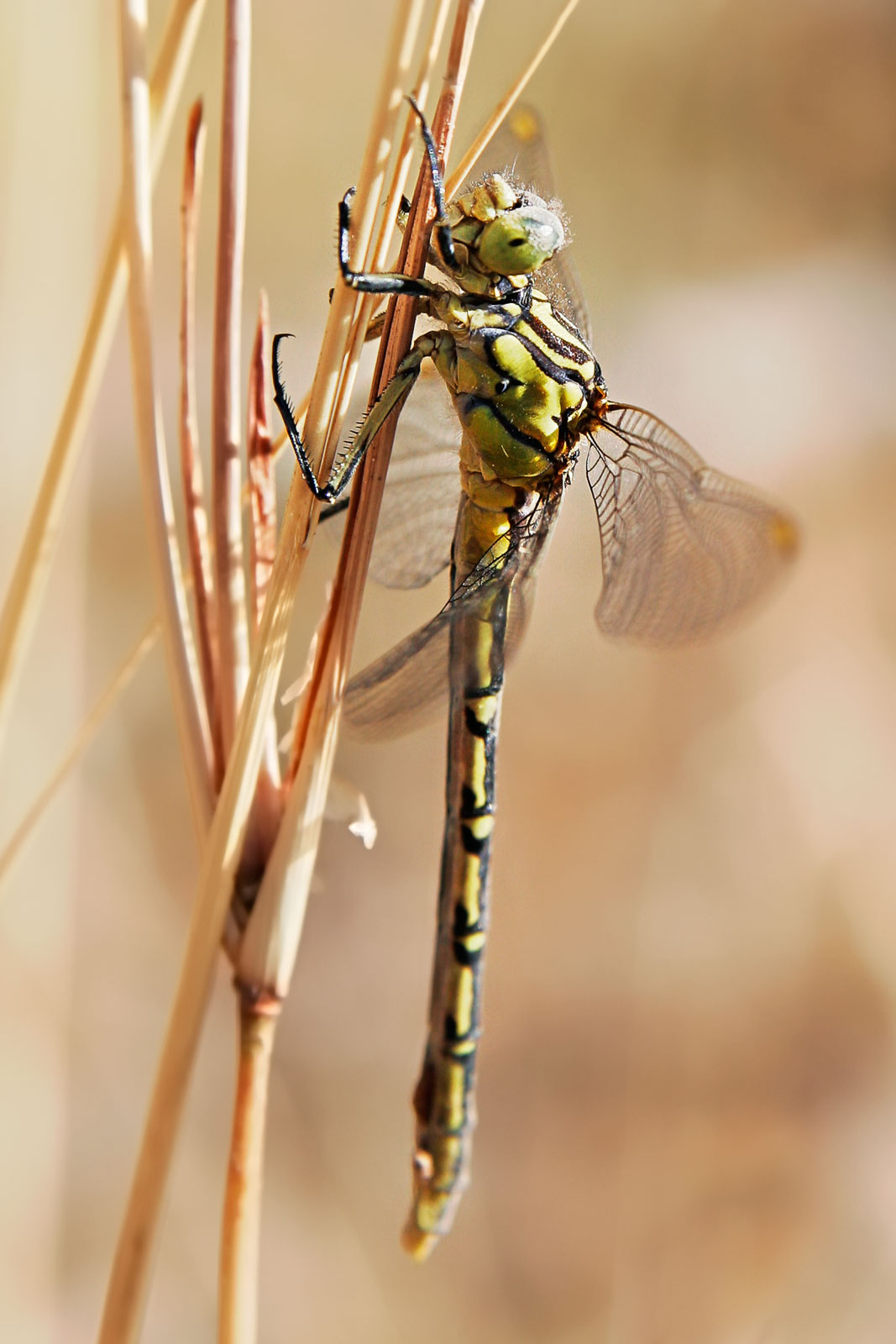
Female lateral view

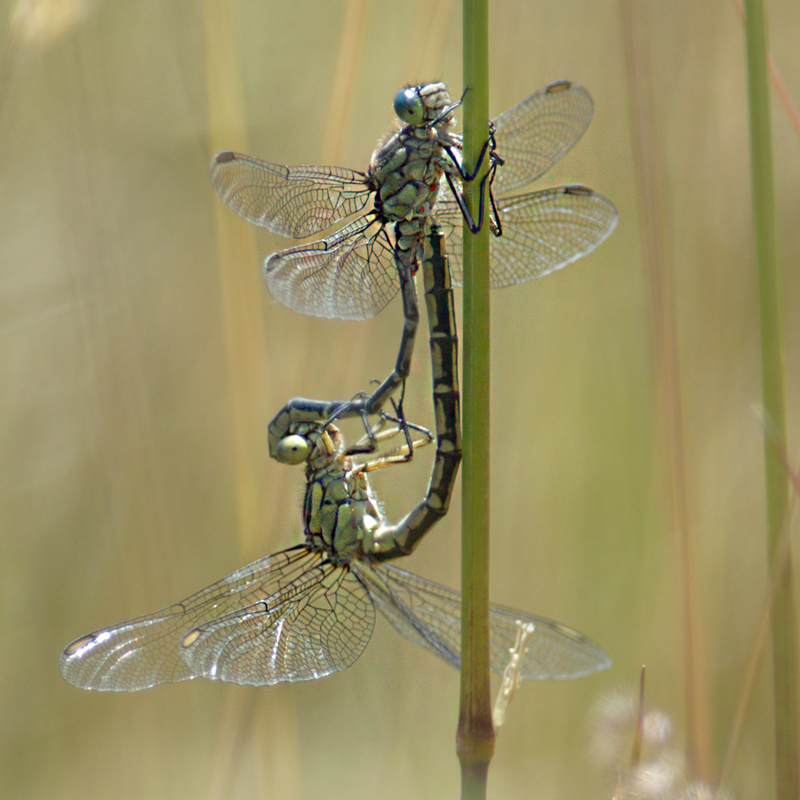
Mating pair, male is above

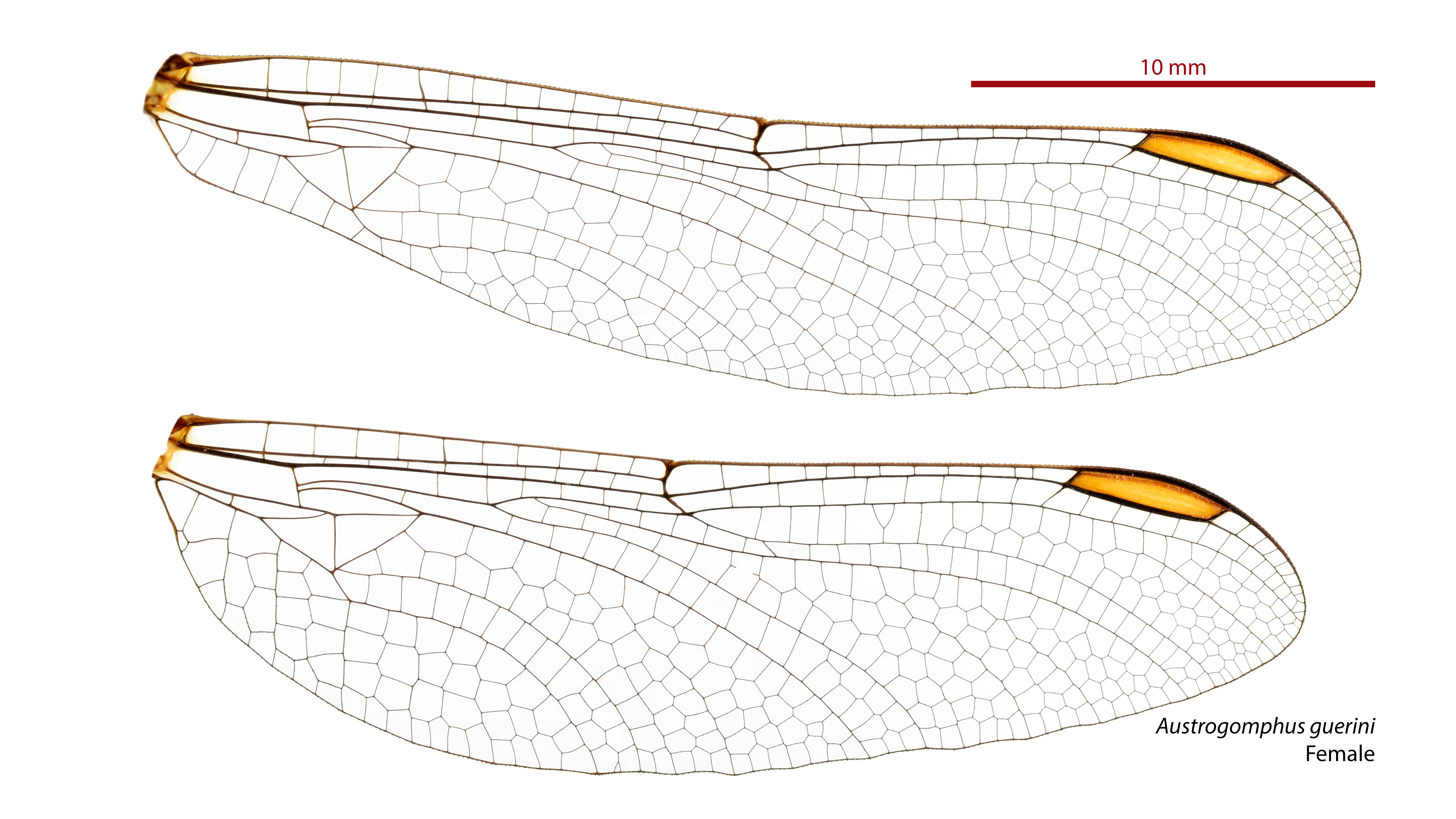
Female wings

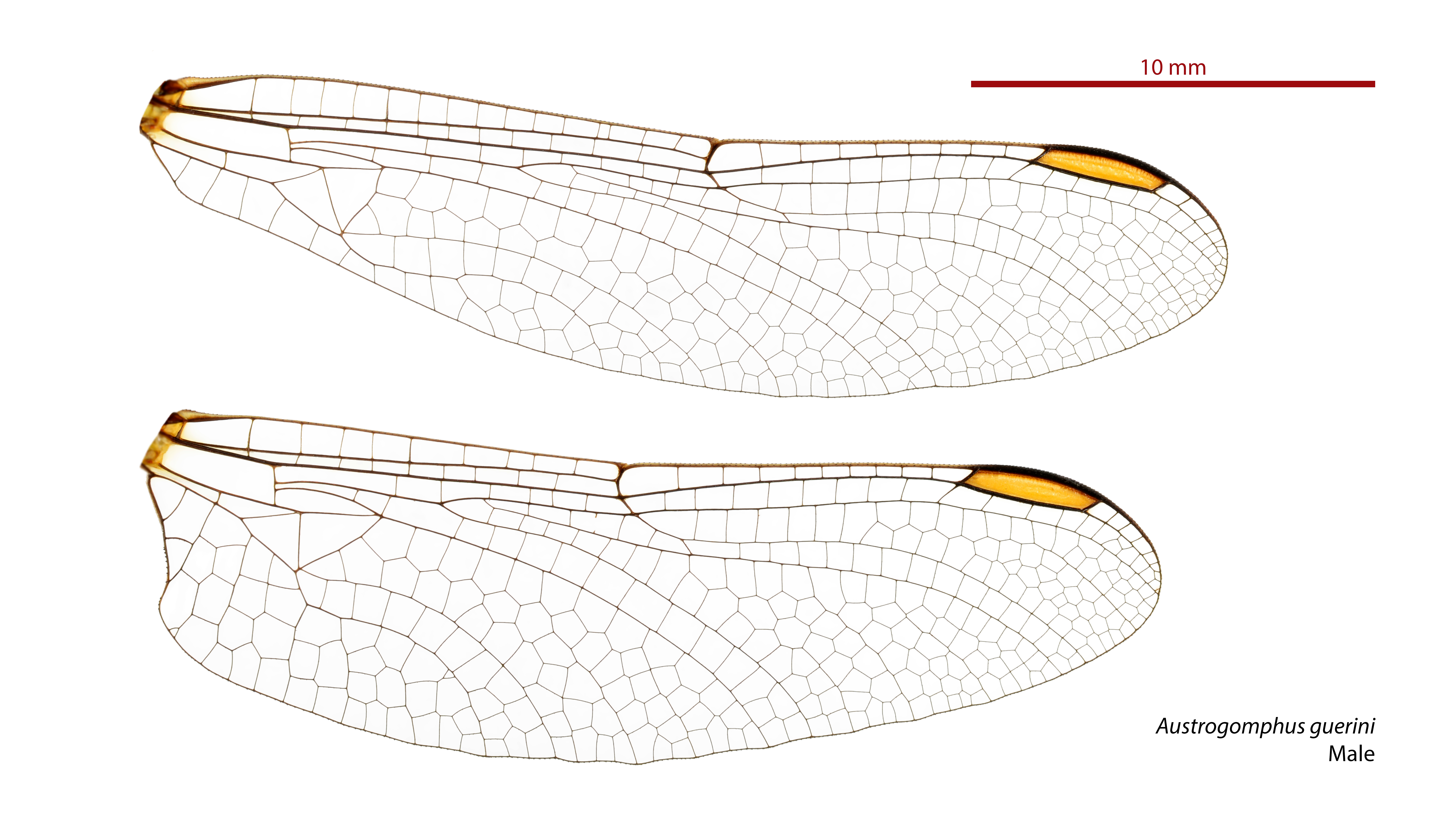
Male wings

== See also ==
- List of Odonata species of Australia
