= Austrogomphus australis =

Inland hunter

Conservation status
- Least Concern (IUCN 3.1)

Scientific classification
- Kingdom: Animalia
- Phylum: Arthropoda
- Clade: Pancrustacea
- Class: Insecta
- Order: Odonata
- Suborder: Anisoptera
- Family: Gomphidae
- Genus: Austrogomphus
- Subgenus: Austrogomphus
- Species: A. australis

Binomial name
- Austrogomphus australis Dale, 1854

Species of dragonfly

Austrogomphus australis, also known as Austrogomphus (Austrogomphus) australis, is a species of dragonfly of the family Gomphidae, commonly known as the inland hunter. It is widespread and common, inhabiting rivers and pools in inland eastern Australia.

Austrogomphus australis is a tiny to medium-sized, black and yellow dragonfly.

== Etymology ==
The genus name Austrogomphus combines the prefix austro- (from Latin auster, meaning “south wind”, hence “southern”) with Gomphus, a genus name derived from Greek γόμφος (gomphos, “peg” or “nail”), alluding to the clubbed shape of the abdomen in males.

The species name australis is Latin for "southern", referring to its occurrence in Australia.

== Gallery ==
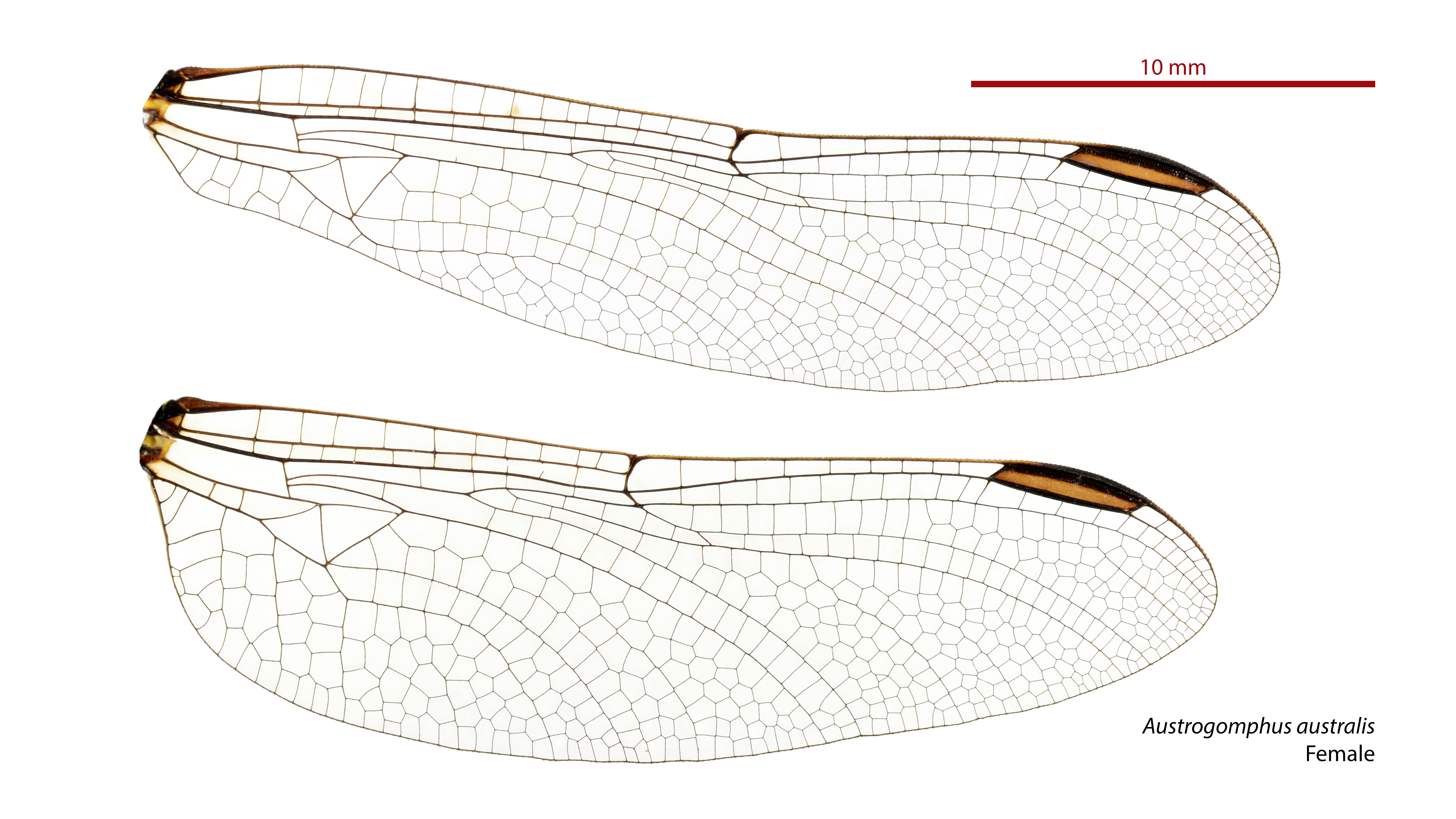
Female wings

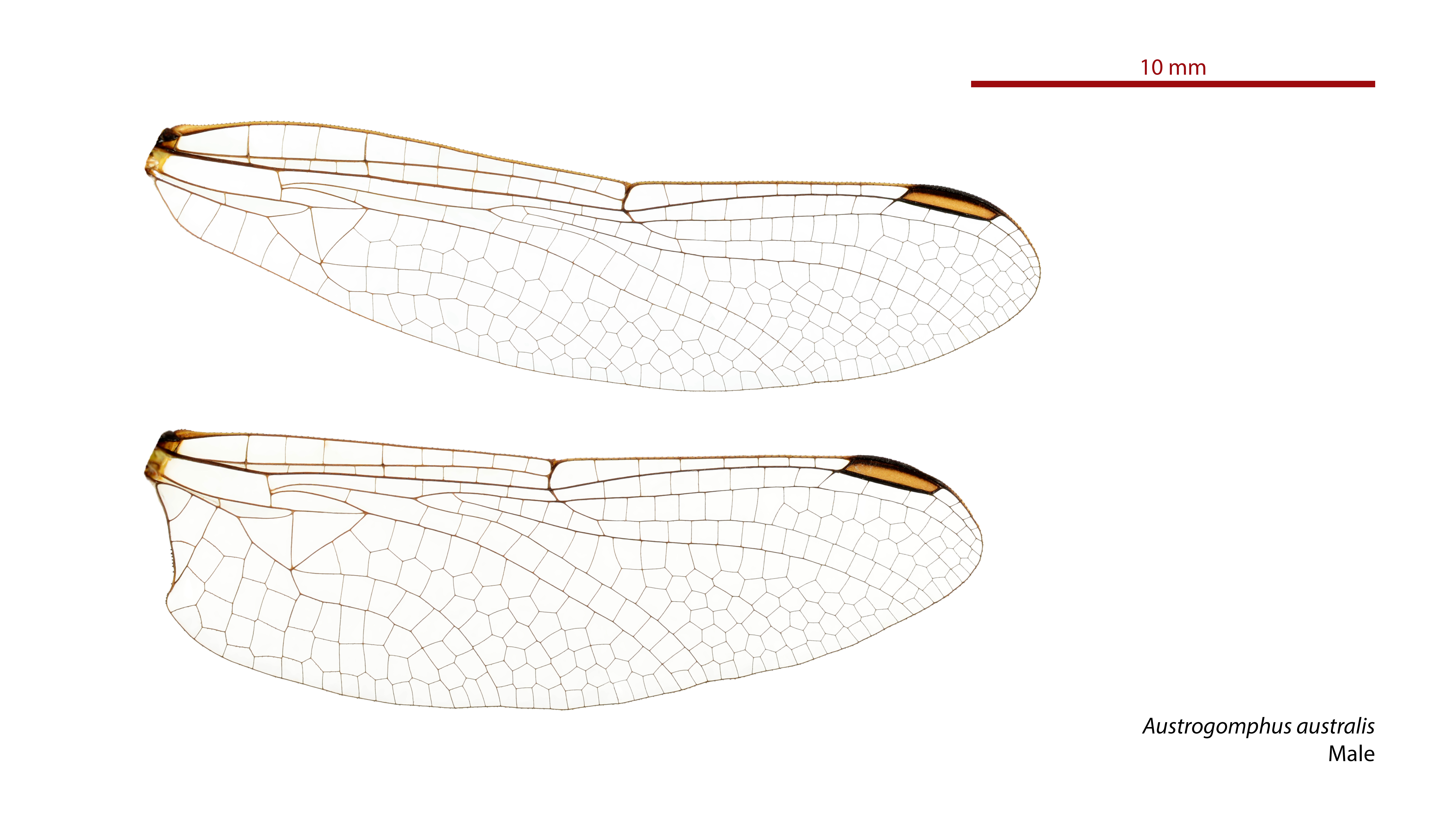
Male wings

== See also ==
- List of Odonata species of Australia
