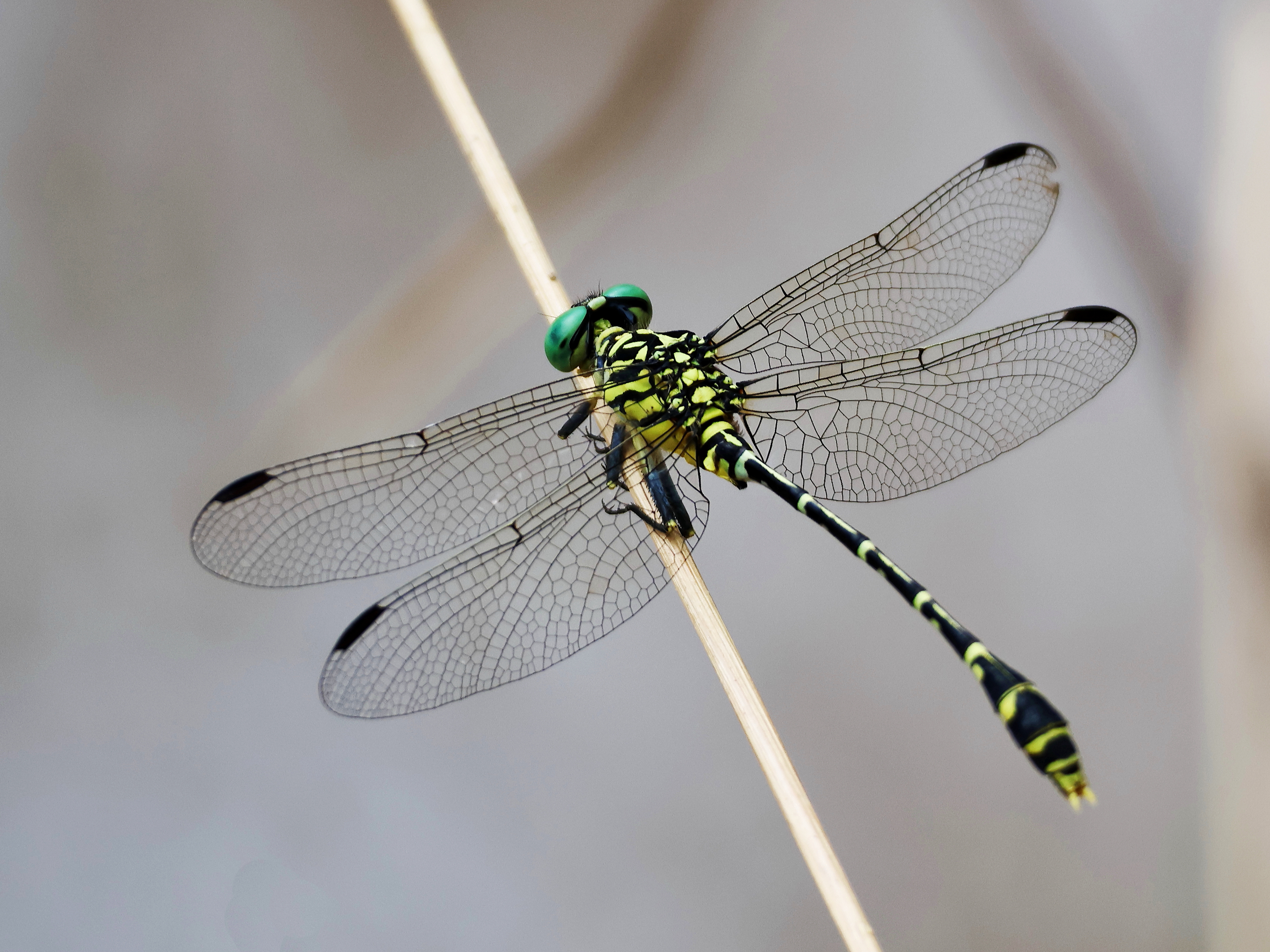
- Male, Innot Hot Springs, Queensland

Conservation status
- Least Concern (IUCN 3.1)

Scientific classification
- Kingdom: Animalia
- Phylum: Arthropoda
- Clade: Pancrustacea
- Class: Insecta
- Order: Odonata
- Suborder: Anisoptera
- Family: Gomphidae
- Genus: Austrogomphus
- Subgenus: Austrogomphus
- Species: A. arbustorum

Binomial name
- Austrogomphus arbustorum Tillyard, 1906

= Austrogomphus arbustorum =

Toothed hunter

Species of dragonfly

Austrogomphus arbustorum, also known as Austrogomphus (Austrogomphus) arbustorum, is a species of very small dragonfly of the family Gomphidae, commonly known as the toothed hunter. It inhabits rivers and pools in northern Queensland, Australia.

Austrogomphus arbustorum is a black and yellow dragonfly.

== Etymology ==
The genus name Austrogomphus combines the prefix austro- (from Latin auster, meaning “south wind”, hence “southern”) with Gomphus, a genus name derived from Greek γόμφος (gomphos, “peg” or “nail”), alluding to the clubbed shape of the abdomen in males.

The species name arbustorum is derived from the Latin arbustum ("planted with trees"). In 1906, Tillyard noted that "it is also fond of flying in and out about the trees on warm, still days."

== Gallery ==
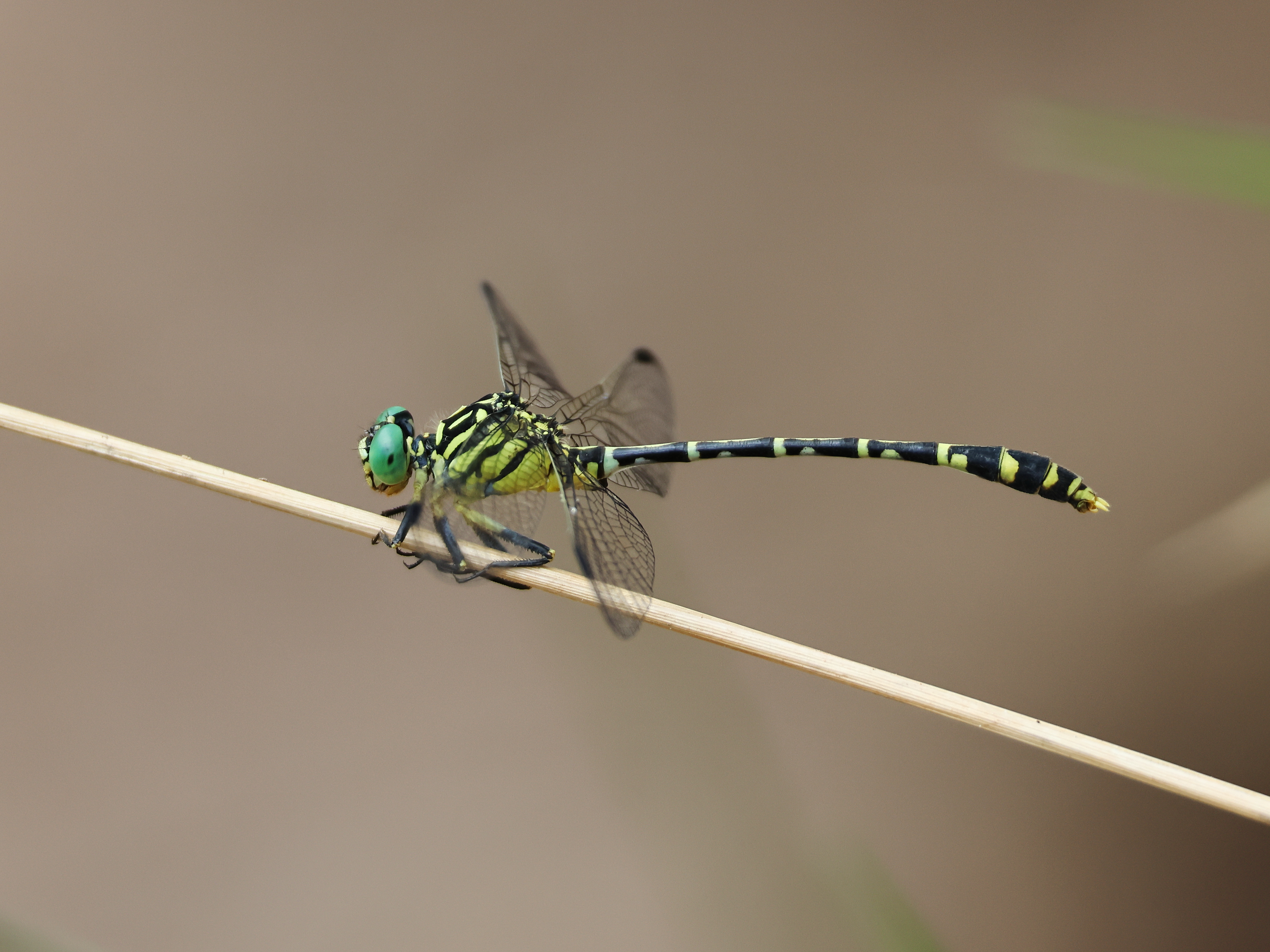
Male, side view

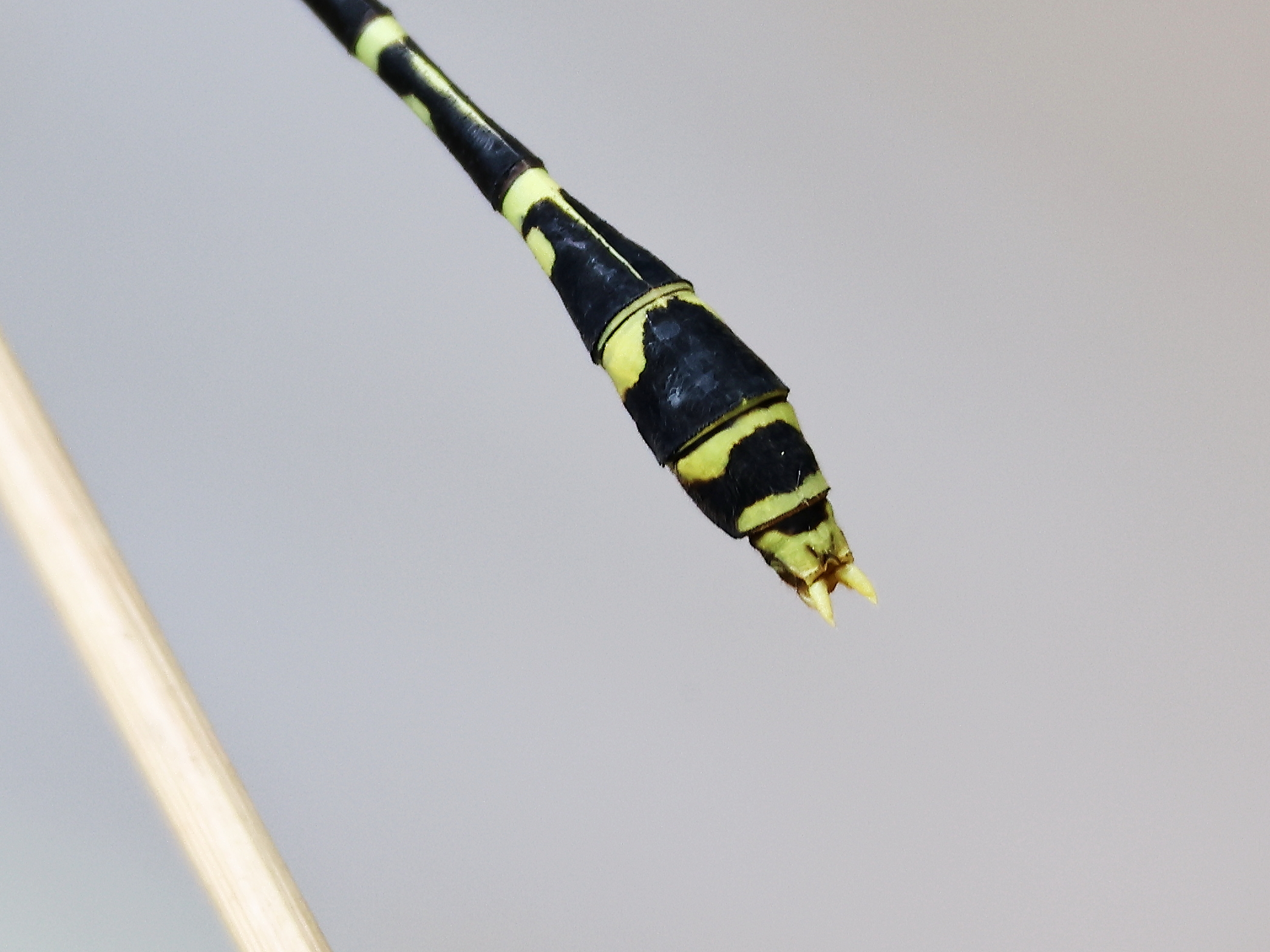
Tip of male abdomen

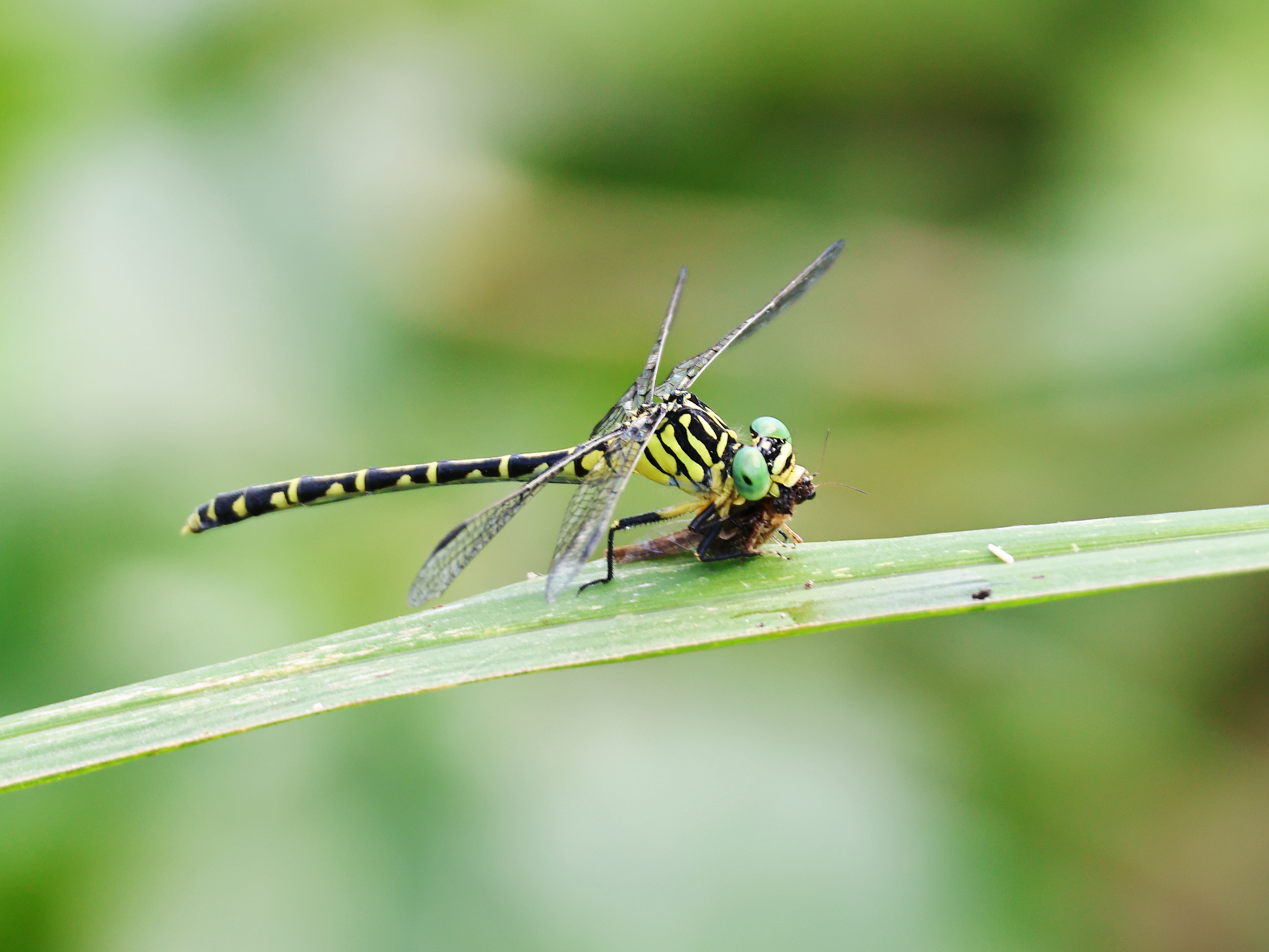
female

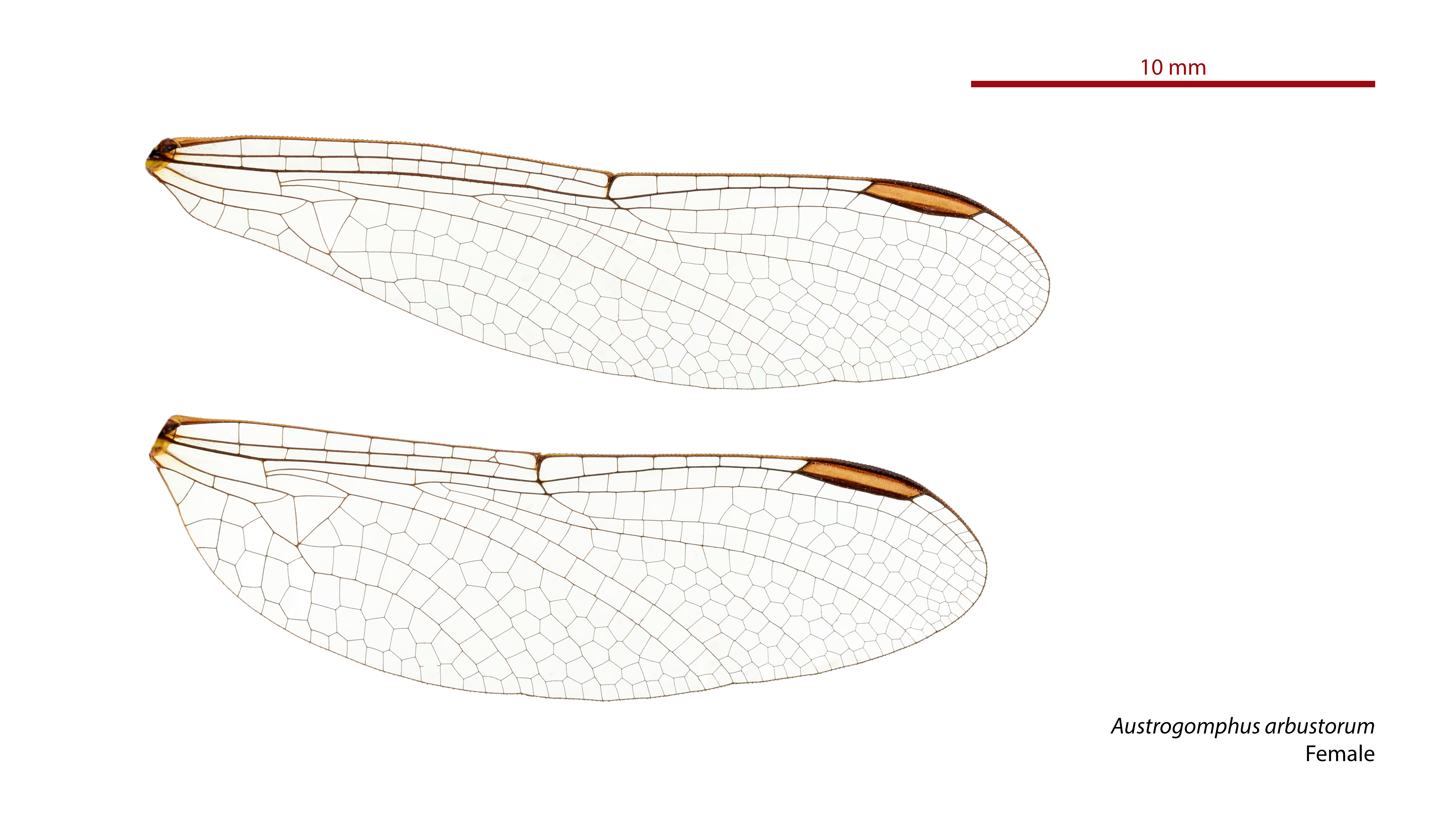
Female wings

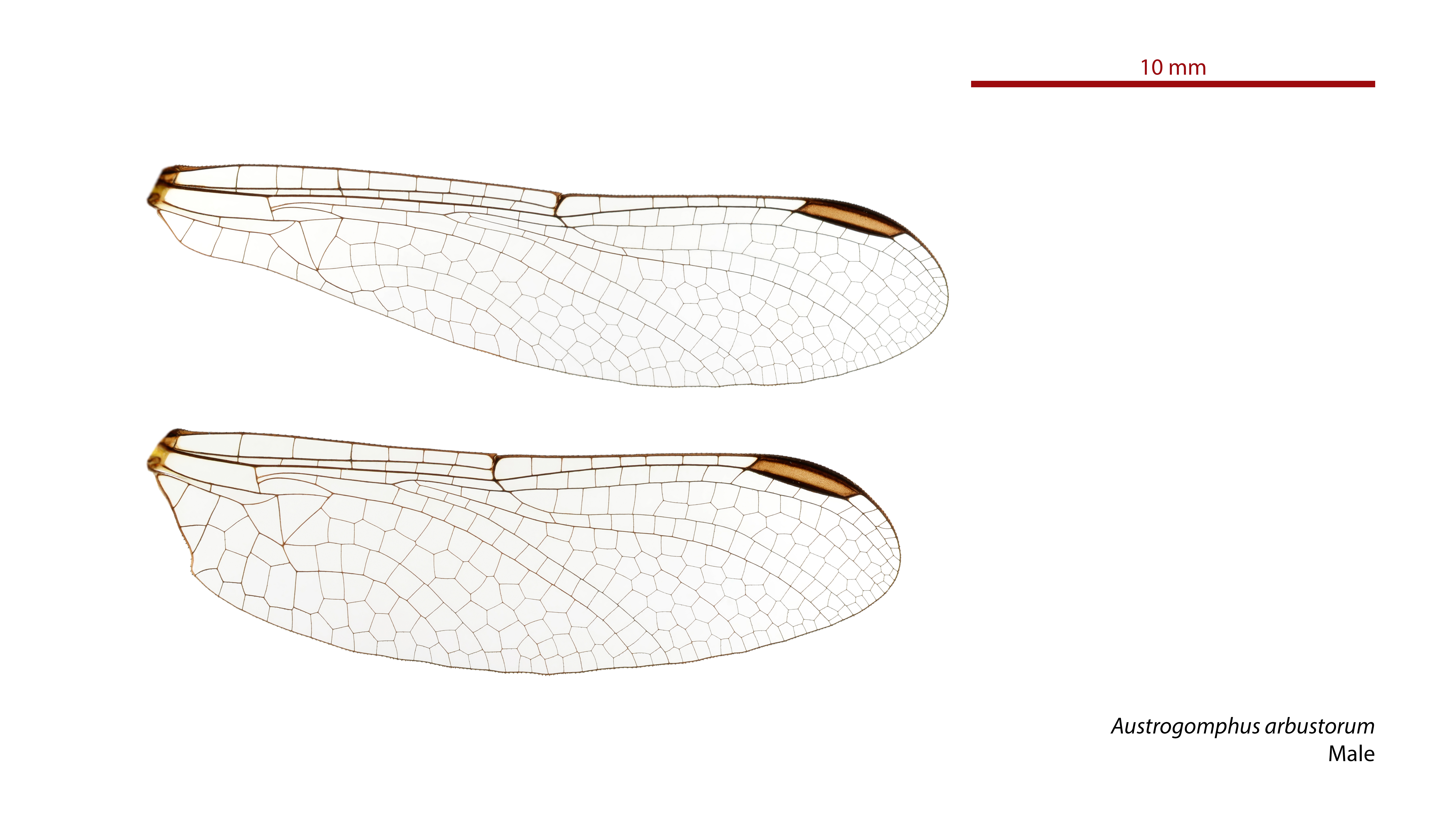
Male wings

== See also ==
- List of Odonata species of Australia
