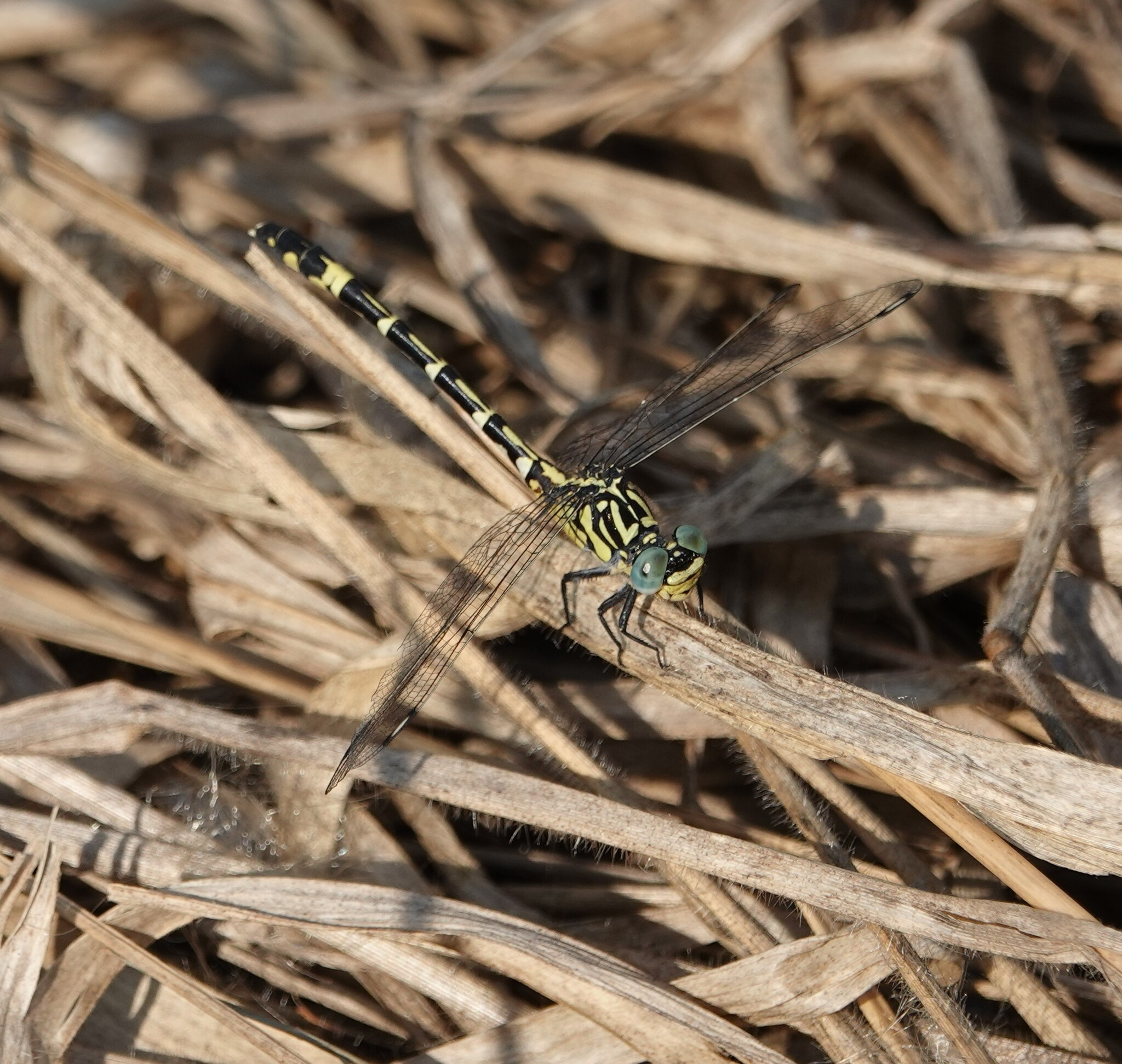
- Female

Conservation status
- Least Concern (IUCN 3.1)

Scientific classification
- Kingdom: Animalia
- Phylum: Arthropoda
- Clade: Pancrustacea
- Class: Insecta
- Order: Odonata
- Suborder: Anisoptera
- Family: Gomphidae
- Genus: Austrogomphus
- Subgenus: Austrogomphus
- Species: A. cornutus

Binomial name
- Austrogomphus cornutus Watson, 1991

= Austrogomphus cornutus =

Unicorn hunter

Species of dragonfly

Austrogomphus cornutus, also known as Austrogomphus (Austrogomphus) cornutus, is a species of dragonfly of the family Gomphidae, commonly known as the unicorn hunter. It inhabits streams and rivers in eastern Australia.

Austrogomphus cornutus is a tiny to medium-sized, black and yellow dragonfly.

== Etymology ==
The genus name Austrogomphus combines the prefix austro- (from Latin auster, meaning “south wind”, hence “southern”) with Gomphus, a genus name derived from Greek γόμφος (gomphos, “peg” or “nail”), alluding to the clubbed shape of the abdomen in males.

The species name cornutus is Latin for "horned", referring to a horn on the rear of the male head.

== Gallery ==
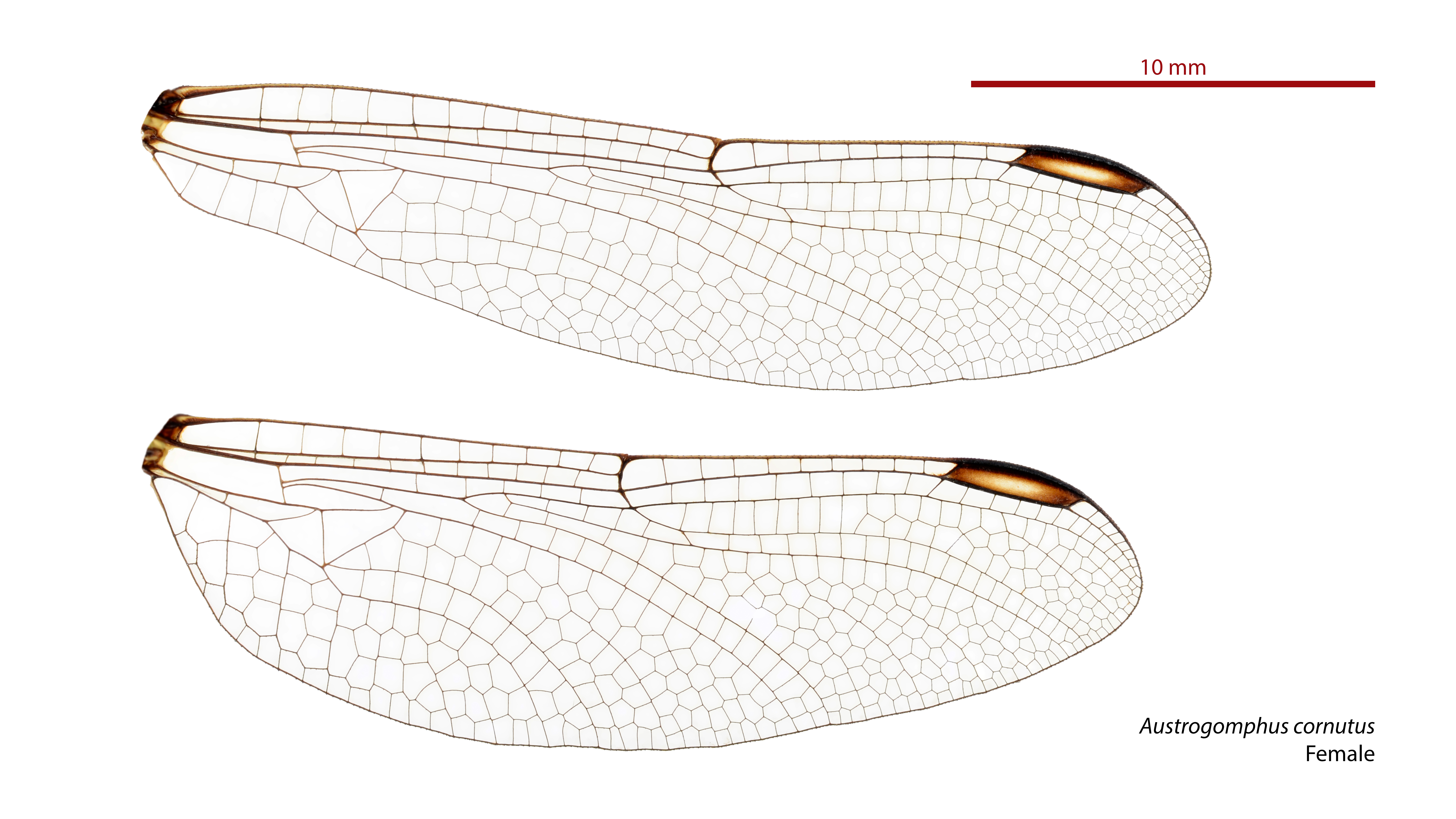
Female wings

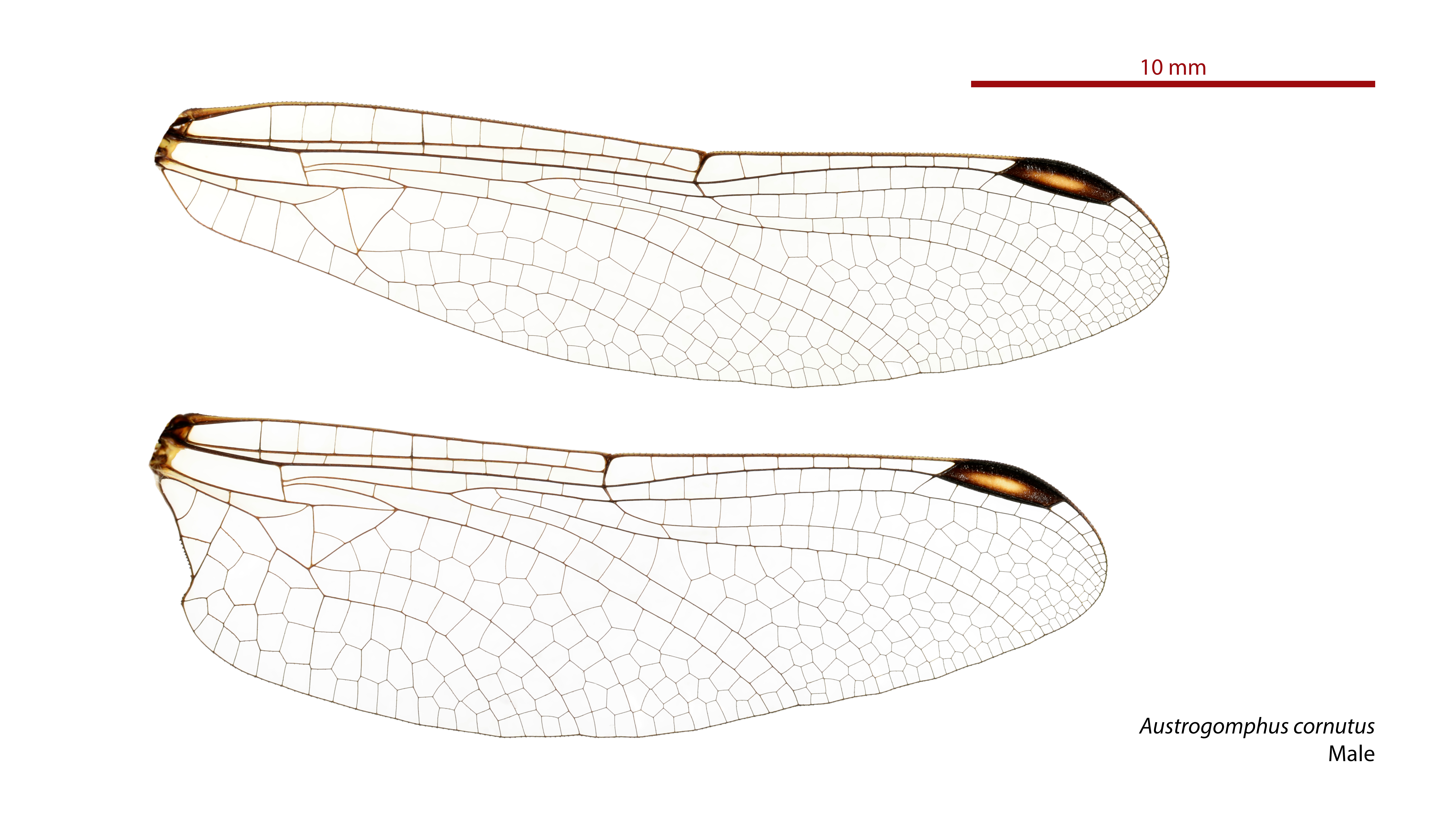
Male wings

== See also ==
- List of Odonata species of Australia
