= Bror Yngve Sjöstedt =

Swedish naturalist (1866–1948)

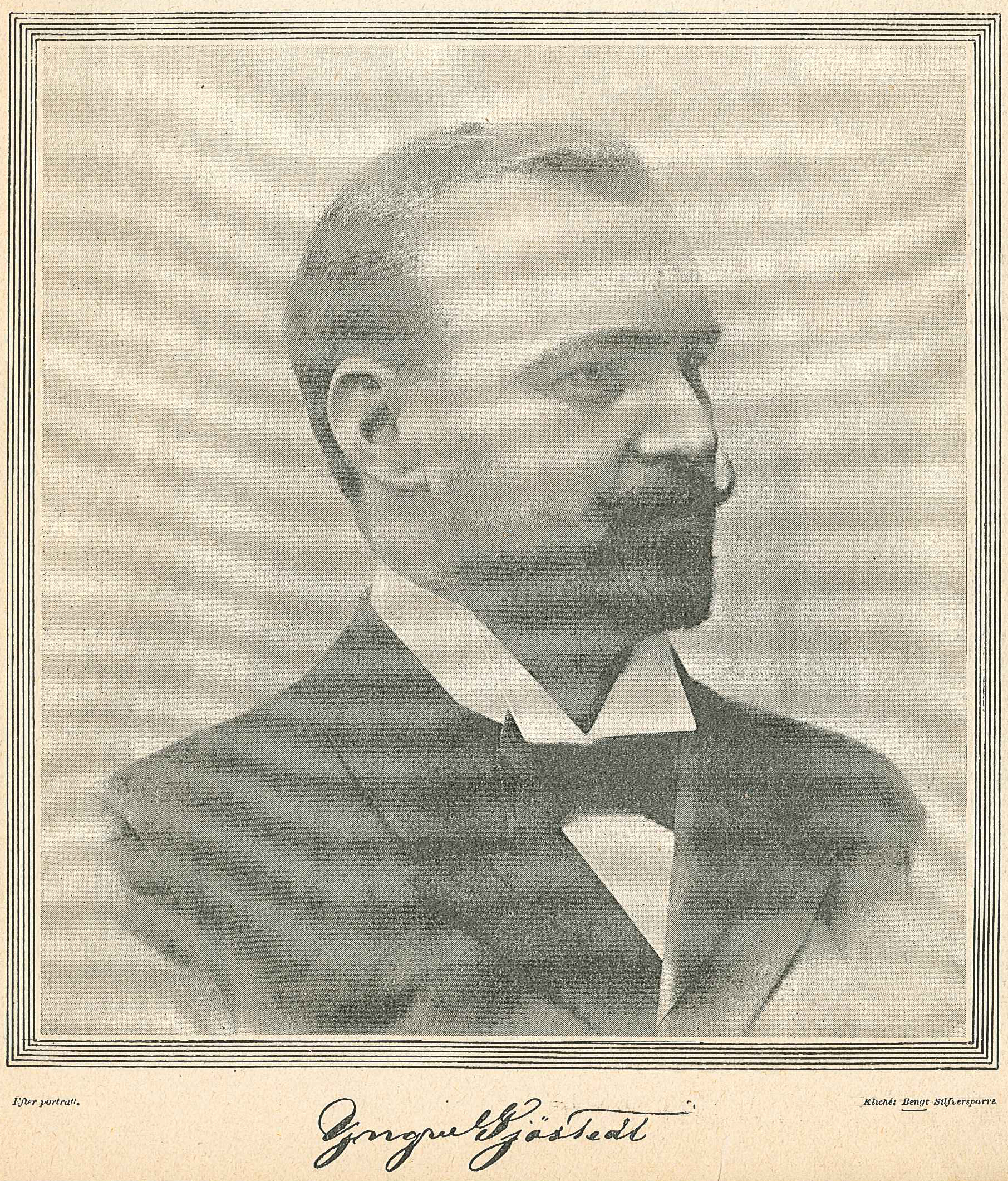
Bror Yngve Sjöstedt

Bror Yngve Sjöstedt (August 3, 1866, Hjo – 1948) was a Swedish naturalist.

Sjöstedt gained his degree and his doctorate in 1896 at the University of Uppsala. He worked as an assistant in Statens Entomologiska Anstalt from 1897 to 1902, becoming a Professor and a Curator in the Swedish Museum of Natural History. He made several expeditions to the west and east of Africa, including Kilimanjaro and edited Wissenschaftliche Ergebnisse der Schwedischen Zoologischen Expedition nach dem Kilimandjaro, dem Meru und umgebenden Massaisteppen Deutsch-Osatafrikas 1905–1906. 2 Band, Abt. 8. Stockholm: K. Schwed. Akad.(1907–1910)
