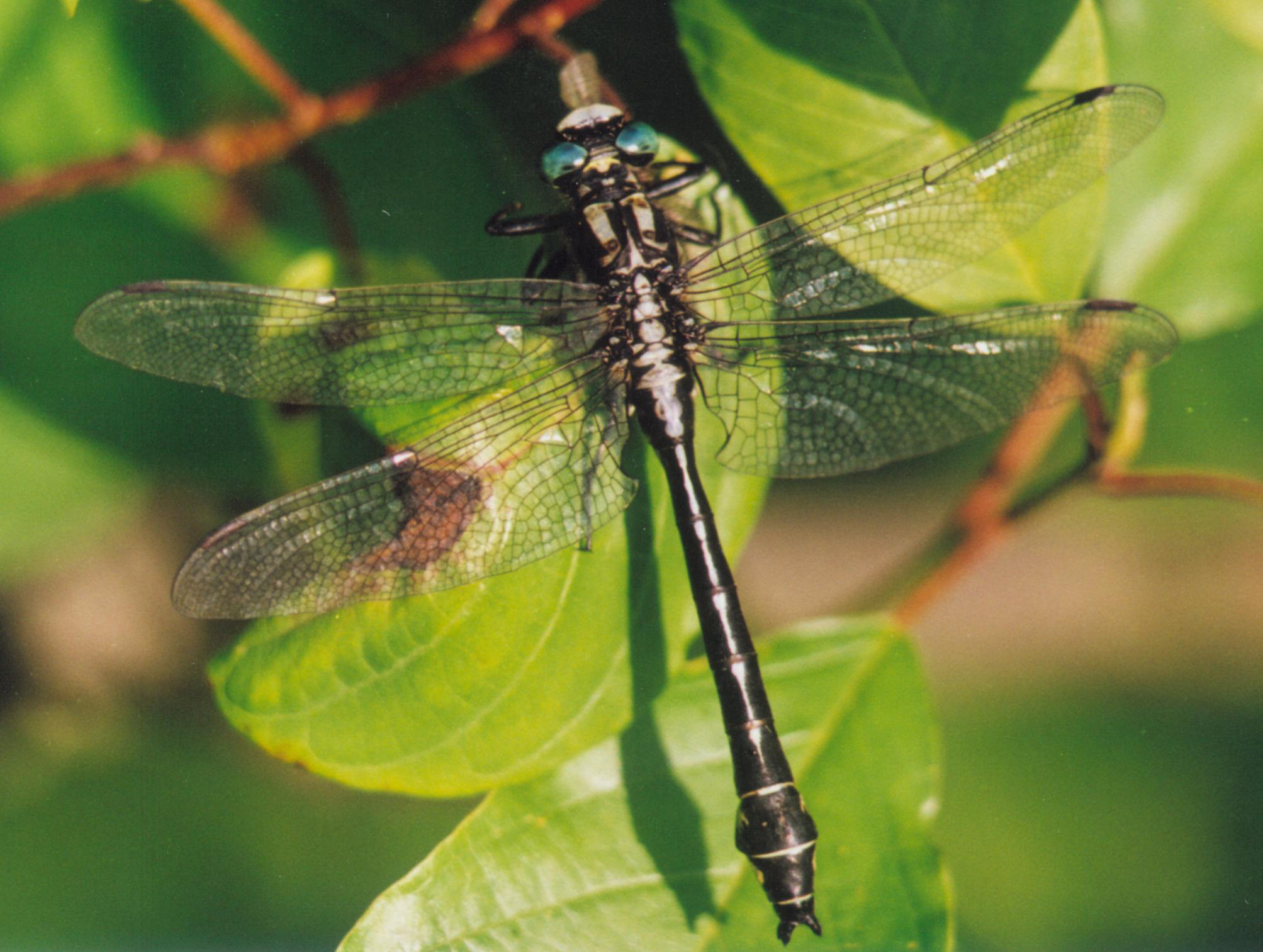
- Gomphus vulgatissimus

Scientific classification
- Kingdom: Animalia
- Phylum: Arthropoda
- Clade: Pancrustacea
- Class: Insecta
- Order: Odonata
- Infraorder: Anisoptera
- Family: Gomphidae
- Genus: Gomphus; Leach, 1815

= Gomphus (dragonfly) =

Genus of dragonflies

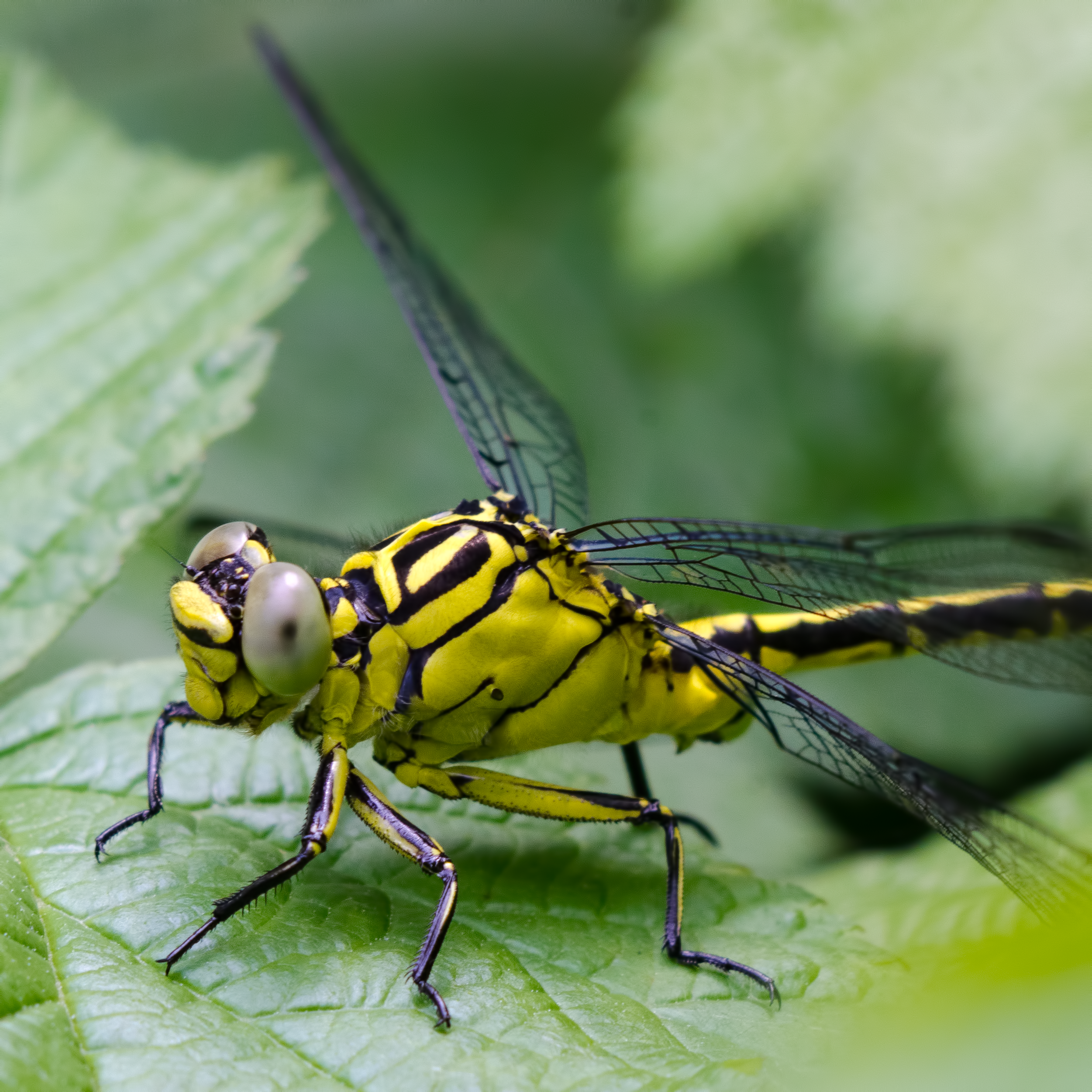
Gomphus flavipes

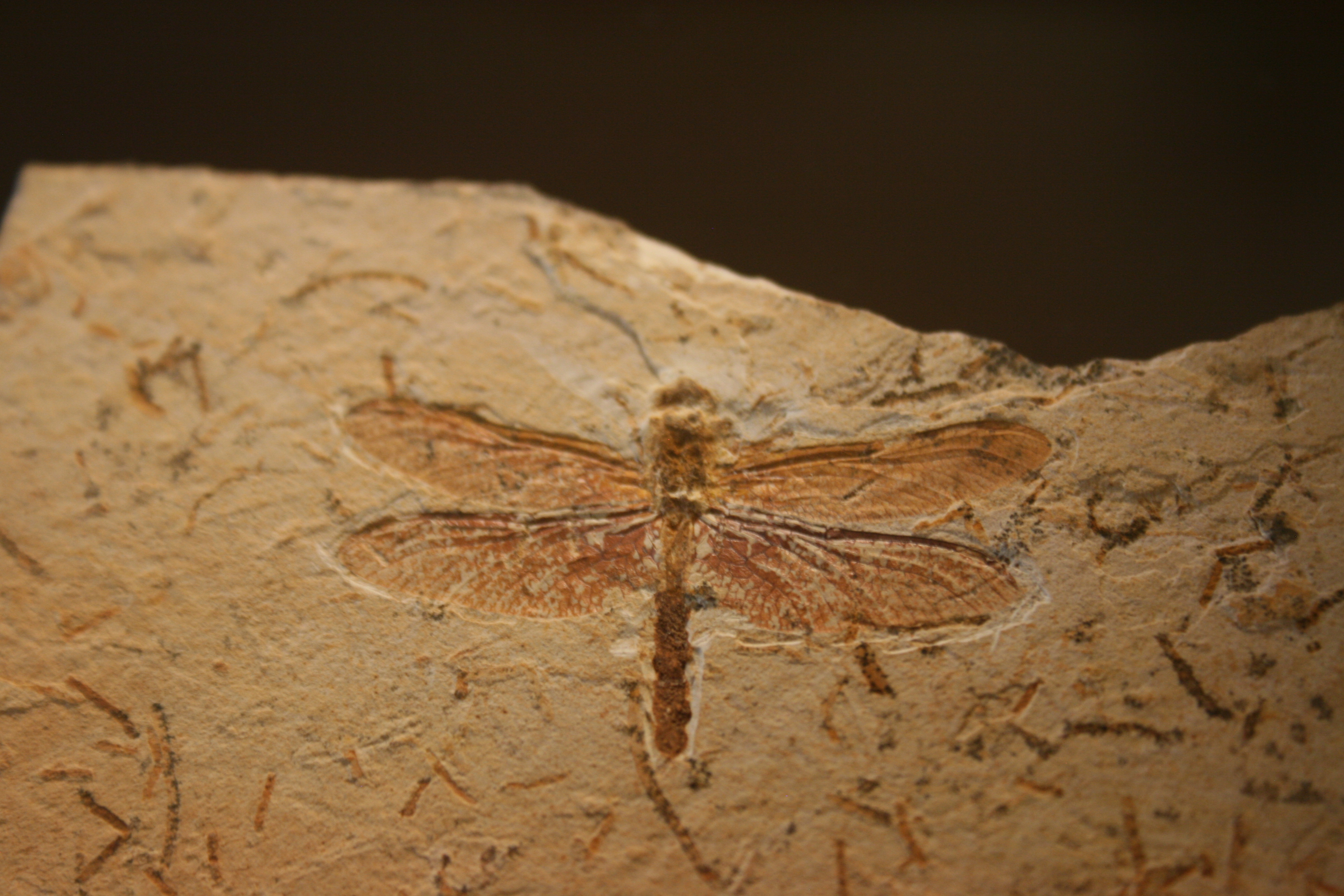
a fossil of a G. tuberculatus of Brazil in the Naturhistorisches Museum (Vienna)

Gomphus is a genus of clubtail dragonflies in the family Gomphidae.

As a result of phylogenetic studies, Gomphus subgenera Gomphurus, Hylogomphus, Phanogomphus, and Stenogomphurus were elevated in rank to genus in 2017. With the removal of their member species, Gomphus ended up with 11 of its previous 54 species, none of which are found in the Western Hemisphere.

== Species ==
These 11 species belong to the genus Gomphus:

Male	Female	Scientific name	Common name	Distribution
		Gomphus davidi Selys, 1887		Israel, Jordan, Lebanon, Syria, and Turkey.
		Gomphus epophtalmus Selys, 1872		Russia
		Gomphus flavipes (Charpentier, 1825)	yellow-legged clubtail, river clubtail	France to eastern Siberia.
		Gomphus graslinii Rambur, 1842	pronged clubtail	France, Portugal, and Spain
		Gomphus kinzelbachi Schneider, 1984		Iran and Iraq.
		Gomphus lucasii Lucas, 1849		Algeria and Tunisia.
		Gomphus pulchellus Selys, 1840	western clubtail	Western Europe
		Gomphus schneiderii Selys, 1850	Turkish clubtail	Europe
		Gomphus simillimus Selys, 1840	yellow clubtail	western Europe and the Maghreb
		Gomphus vulgatissimus (Linnaeus, 1758)	common clubtail, club-tailed dragonfly	Europe

These species formerly belonged to the genus Gomphus:

- Gomphurus crassus (Hagen in Selys, 1878) (handsome clubtail)
- Gomphurus dilatatus (Rambur, 1842) (blackwater clubtail)
- Gomphurus externus (Hagen in Selys, 1858) (plains clubtail)
- Gomphurus fraternus (Say, 1840) (midland clubtail)
- Gomphurus gonzalezi (Dunkle, 1992) (tamaulipan clubtail)
- Gomphurus hybridus (Williamson, 1902) (cocoa clubtail)
- Gomphurus lineatifrons (Calvert, 1921) (splendid clubtail)
- Gomphurus lynnae (Paulson, 1983) (Columbia clubtail)
- Gomphurus modestus (Needham, 1942) (gulf coast clubtail)
- Gomphurus ozarkensis (Westfall, 1975) (Ozark clubtail)
- Gomphurus septima (Westfall, 1956) (Septima's clubtail)
- Gomphurus vastus (Walsh, 1862) (cobra clubtail)
- Gomphurus ventricosus (Walsh, 1863) (skillet clubtail)
- Hylogomphus abbreviatus (Hagen in Selys, 1878) (spine-crowned clubtail)
- Hylogomphus adelphus (Selys, 1858) (mustached clubtail)
- Hylogomphus apomyius (Donnelly, 1966) (banner clubtail)
- Hylogomphus geminatus (Carle, 1979) (twin-striped clubtail)
- Hylogomphus parvidens (Currie, 1917) (Piedmont clubtail)
- Hylogomphus viridifrons (Hine, 1901) (green-faced clubtail)
- Phanogomphus australis (Needham, 1897) (clearlake clubtail)
- Phanogomphus borealis (Needham, 1901) (beaverpond clubtail)
- Phanogomphus cavillaris (Needham, 1902) (sandhill clubtail)
- Phanogomphus descriptus (Banks, 1896) (harpoon clubtail)
- Phanogomphus diminutus (Needham, 1950) (diminutive clubtail)
- Phanogomphus exilis (Selys, 1854) (lancet clubtail)
- Phanogomphus graslinellus (Walsh, 1862) (pronghorn clubtail)
- Phanogomphus hodgesi (Needham, 1950) (Hodges' clubtail)
- Phanogomphus kurilis (Hagen in Selys, 1858) (Pacific clubtail)
- Phanogomphus lividus (Selys, 1854) (ashy clubtail)
- Phanogomphus militaris (Hagen in Selys, 1858) (sulphur-tipped clubtail)
- Phanogomphus minutus (Rambur, 1842) (cypress clubtail)
- Phanogomphus oklahomensis (Pritchard, 1935) (Oklahoma clubtail)
- Phanogomphus quadricolor (Walsh, 1863) (rapids clubtail)
- Phanogomphus sandrius (Tennessen, 1983) (Tennessee clubtail)
- Phanogomphus spicatus (Hagen in Selys, 1854) (dusky clubtail)
- Phanogomphus westfalli (Carle & May, 1987) (Westfall's clubtail)
- Stenogomphurus consanguis (Selys, 1879) (Cherokee clubtail)
- Stenogomphurus rogersi (Gloyd, 1936) (sable clubtail)

== Etymology ==
The genus name Gomphus is derived from the Greek γόμφος (gomphos, "bolt" or "nail"), referring to the shape of the abdomen, likened to a bolt used in shipbuilding.
