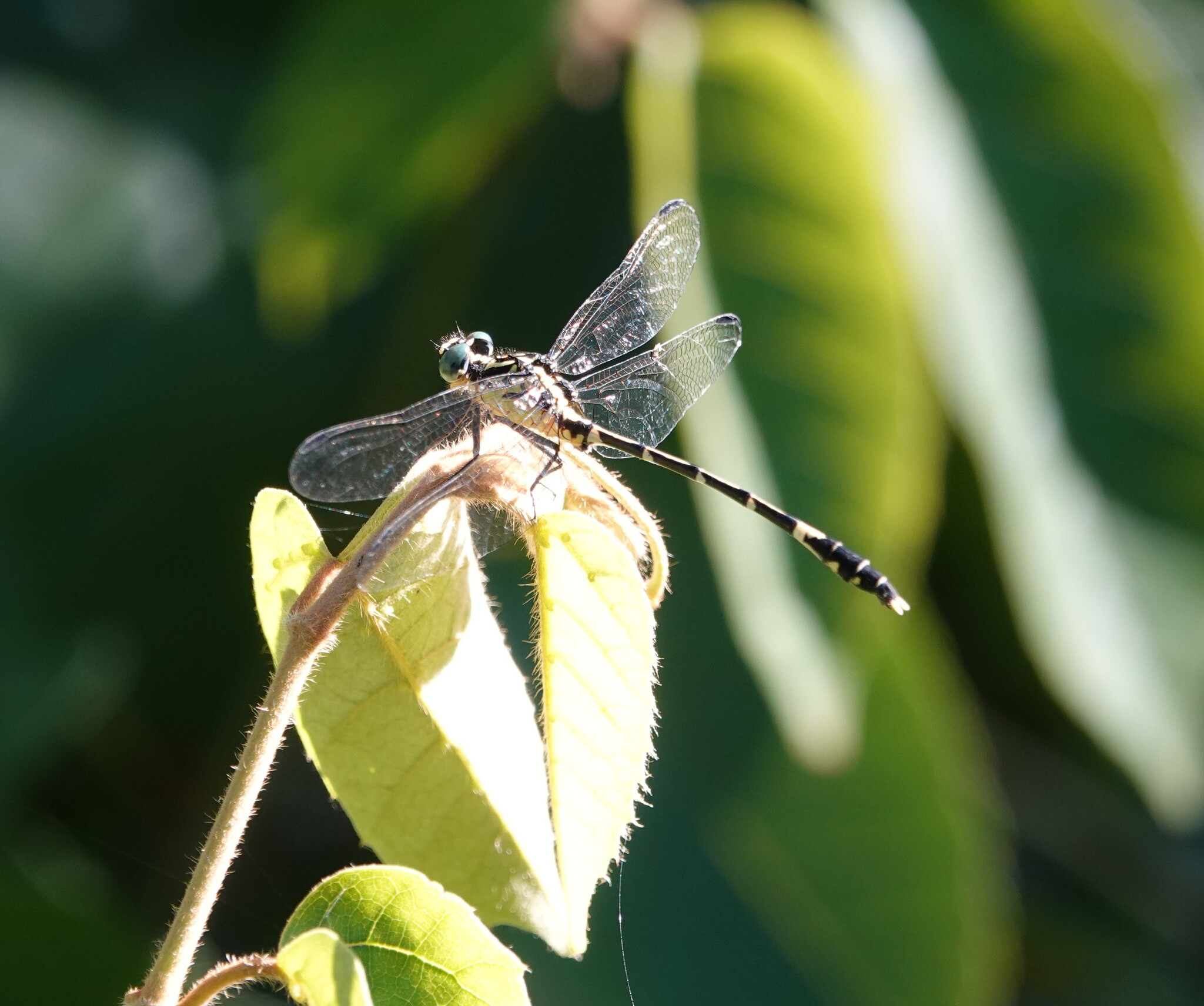
- Male
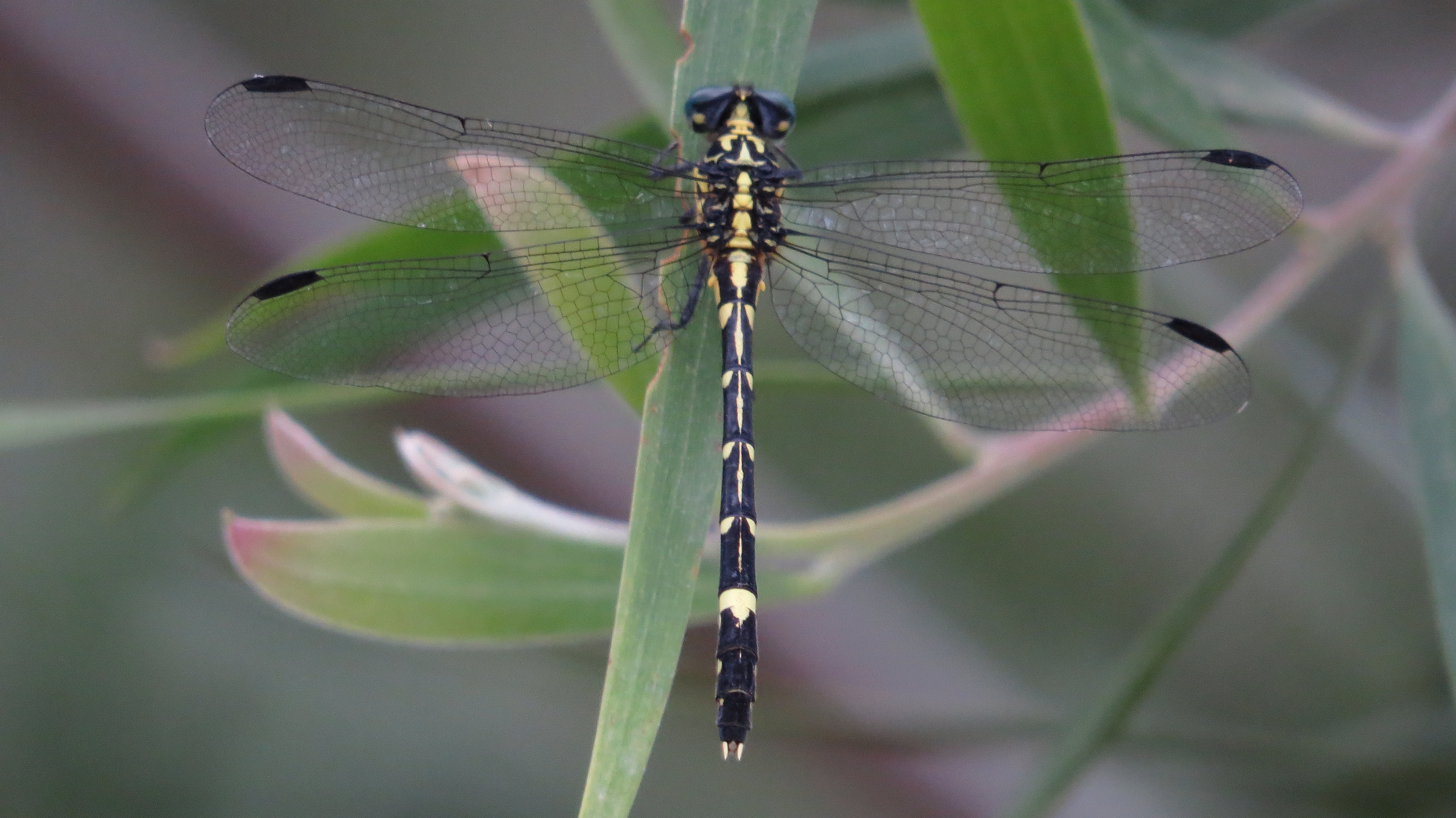
- Female

Conservation status
- Least Concern (IUCN 3.1)

Scientific classification
- Kingdom: Animalia
- Phylum: Arthropoda
- Clade: Pancrustacea
- Class: Insecta
- Order: Odonata
- Suborder: Anisoptera
- Family: Gomphidae
- Genus: Austrogomphus
- Subgenus: Pleiogomphus
- Species: A. amphiclitus

Binomial name
- Austrogomphus amphiclitus (Selys, 1873)

Synonyms
- Hemigomphus amphiclitus Selys, 1873; Austrogomphus risi Martin, 1901

= Austrogomphus amphiclitus =

Pale hunter

Species of dragonfly

Austrogomphus amphiclitus, also known as Austrogomphus (Pleiogomphus) amphiclitus, is a species of dragonfly of the family Gomphidae, commonly known as the pale hunter. It inhabits streams and rivers in eastern Australia.

Austrogomphus amphiclitus is a medium-sized, black and yellow dragonfly.

== Etymology ==
The genus name Austrogomphus combines the prefix austro- (from Latin auster, meaning “south wind”, hence “southern”) with Gomphus, a genus name derived from Greek γόμφος (gomphos, “peg” or “nail”), alluding to the clubbed shape of the abdomen in males.

The species name amphiclitus is derived from Greek ἀμφί (amphi, "on both sides") and κλιτός (klitos, "sloping"), hence "sloping on both sides", likely referring to a deformity of the original specimen's abdomen not present in live specimens.

== Gallery ==
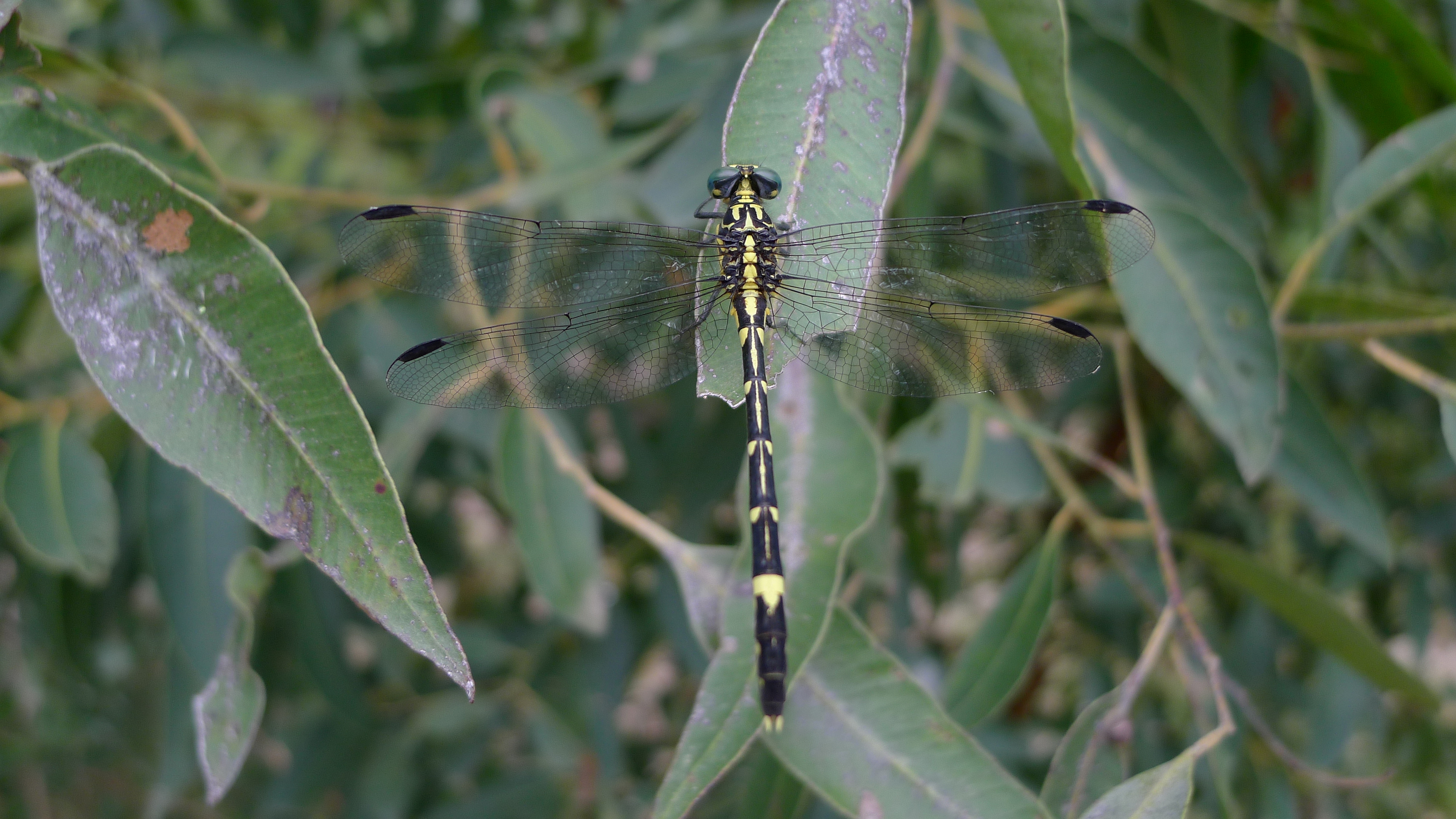
Female showing rounded inboard edge of hindwing

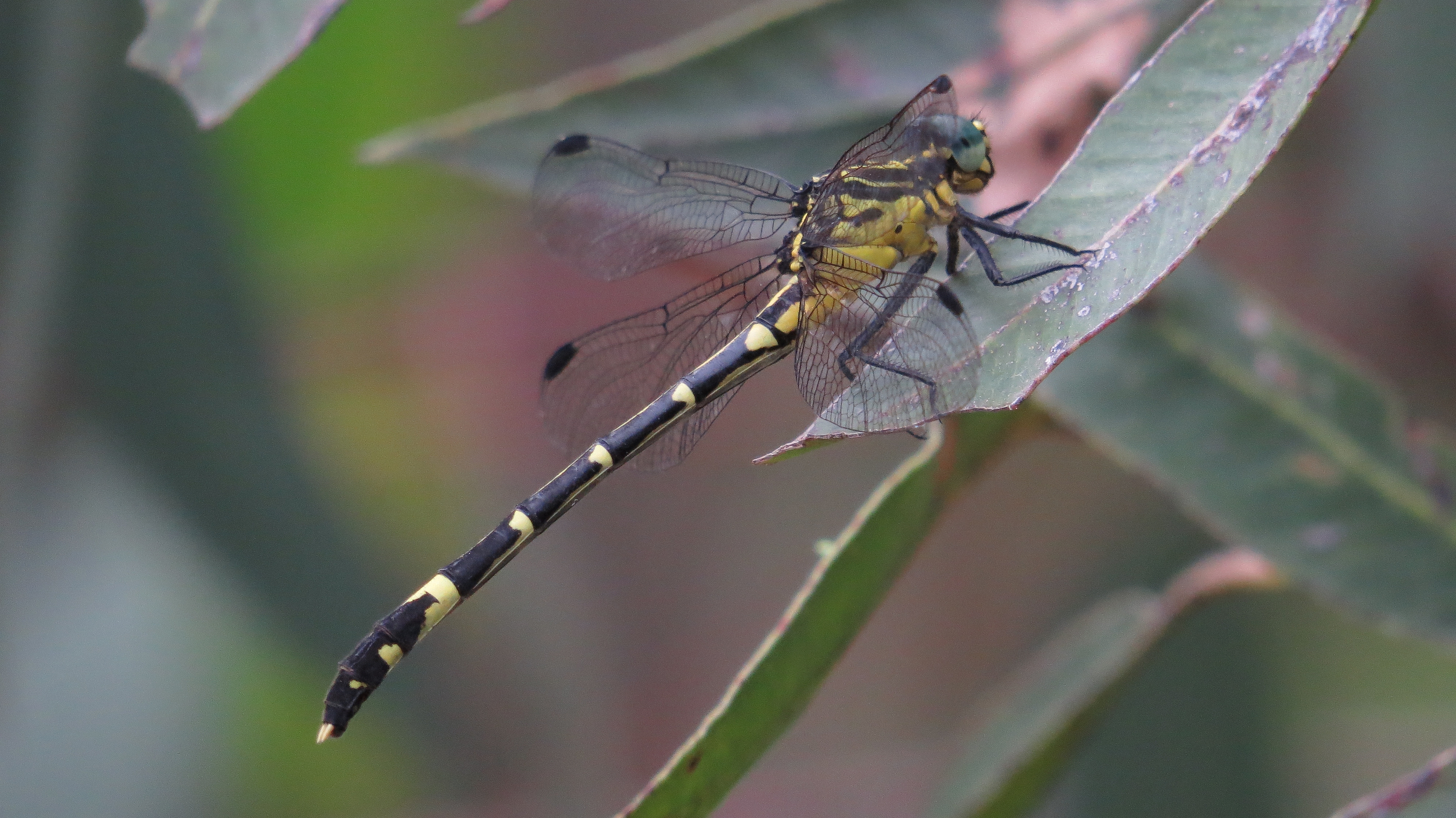
Side view of female

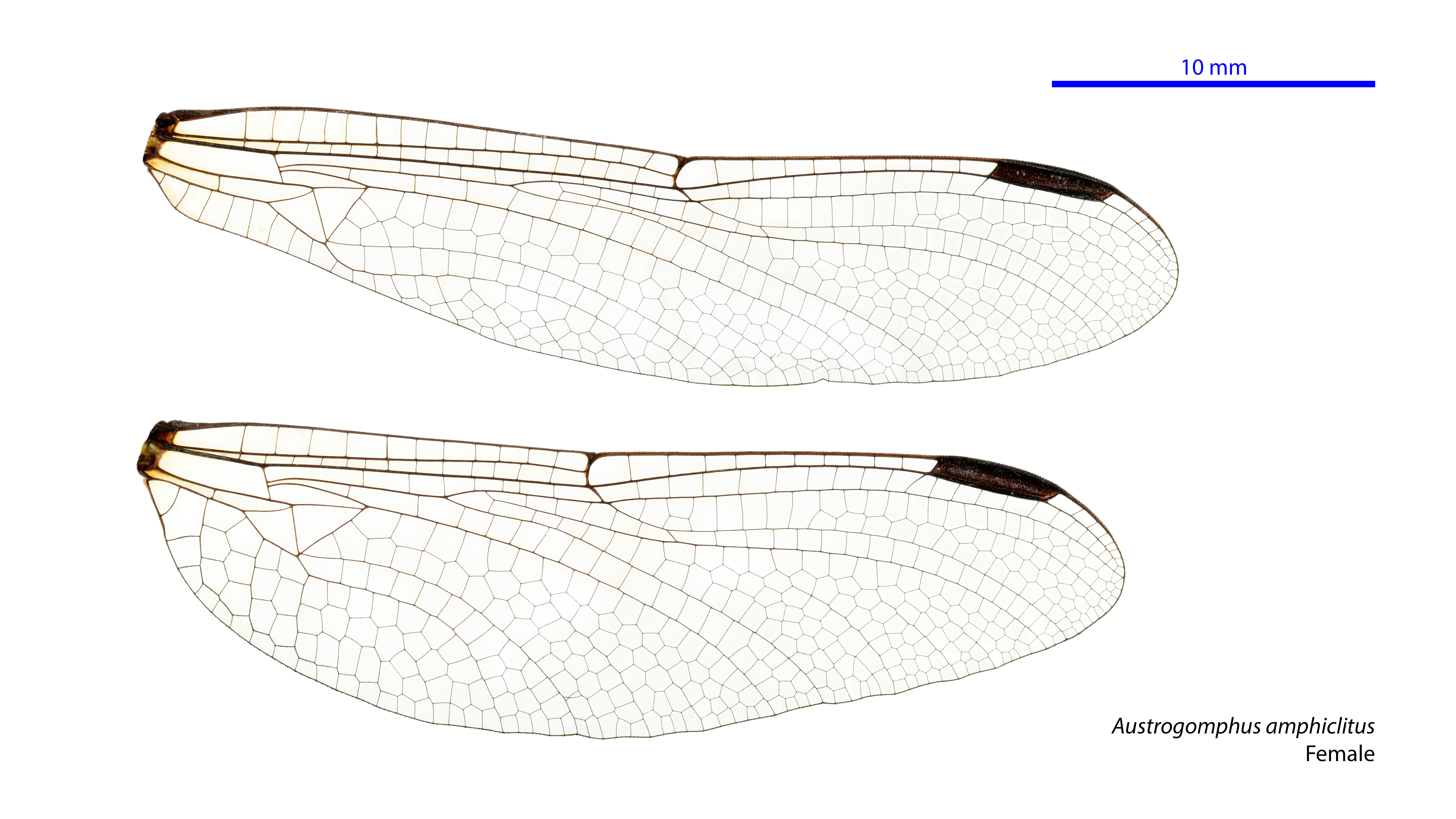
Female wings

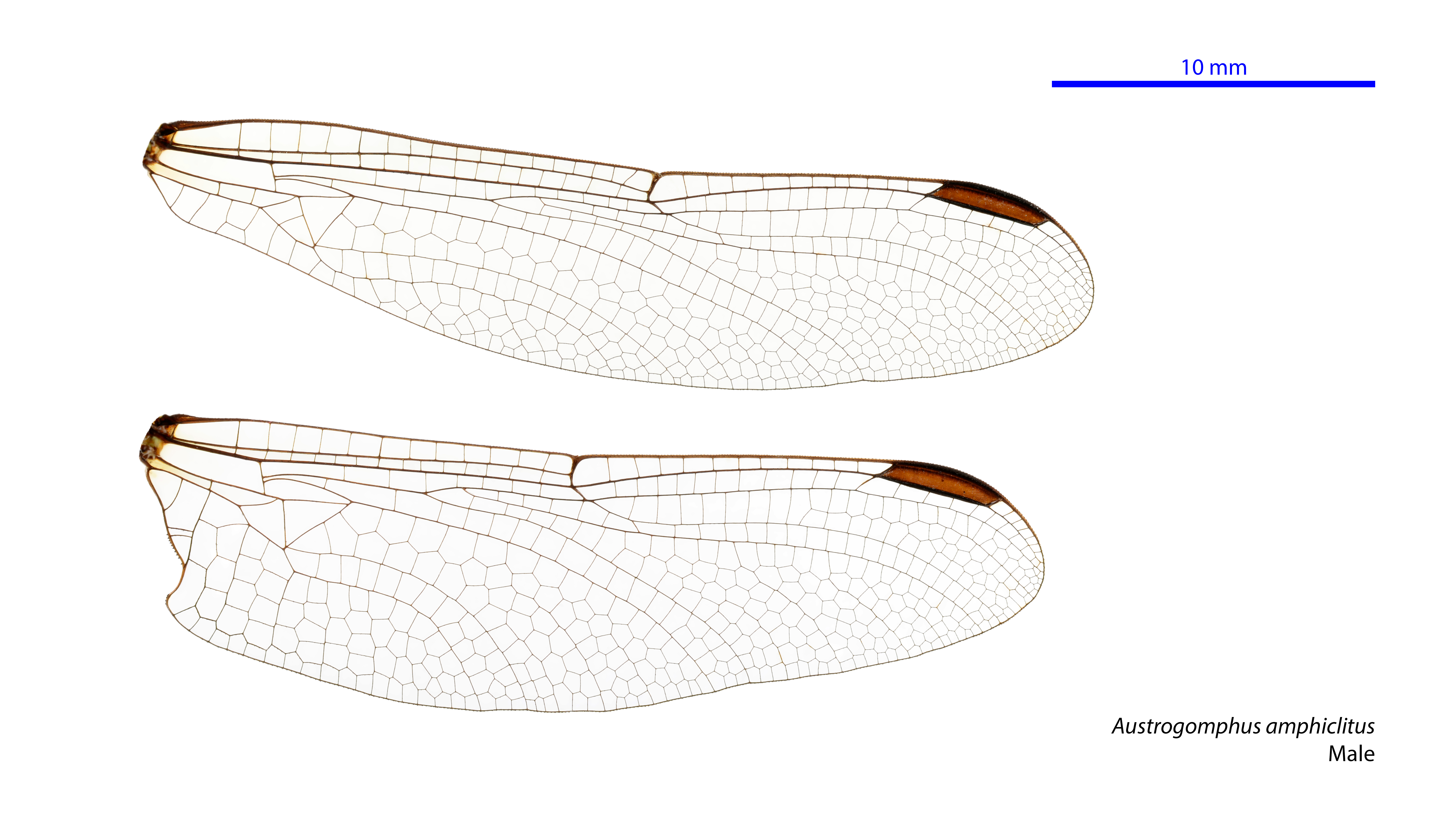
Male wings

== See also ==
- List of Odonata species of Australia
