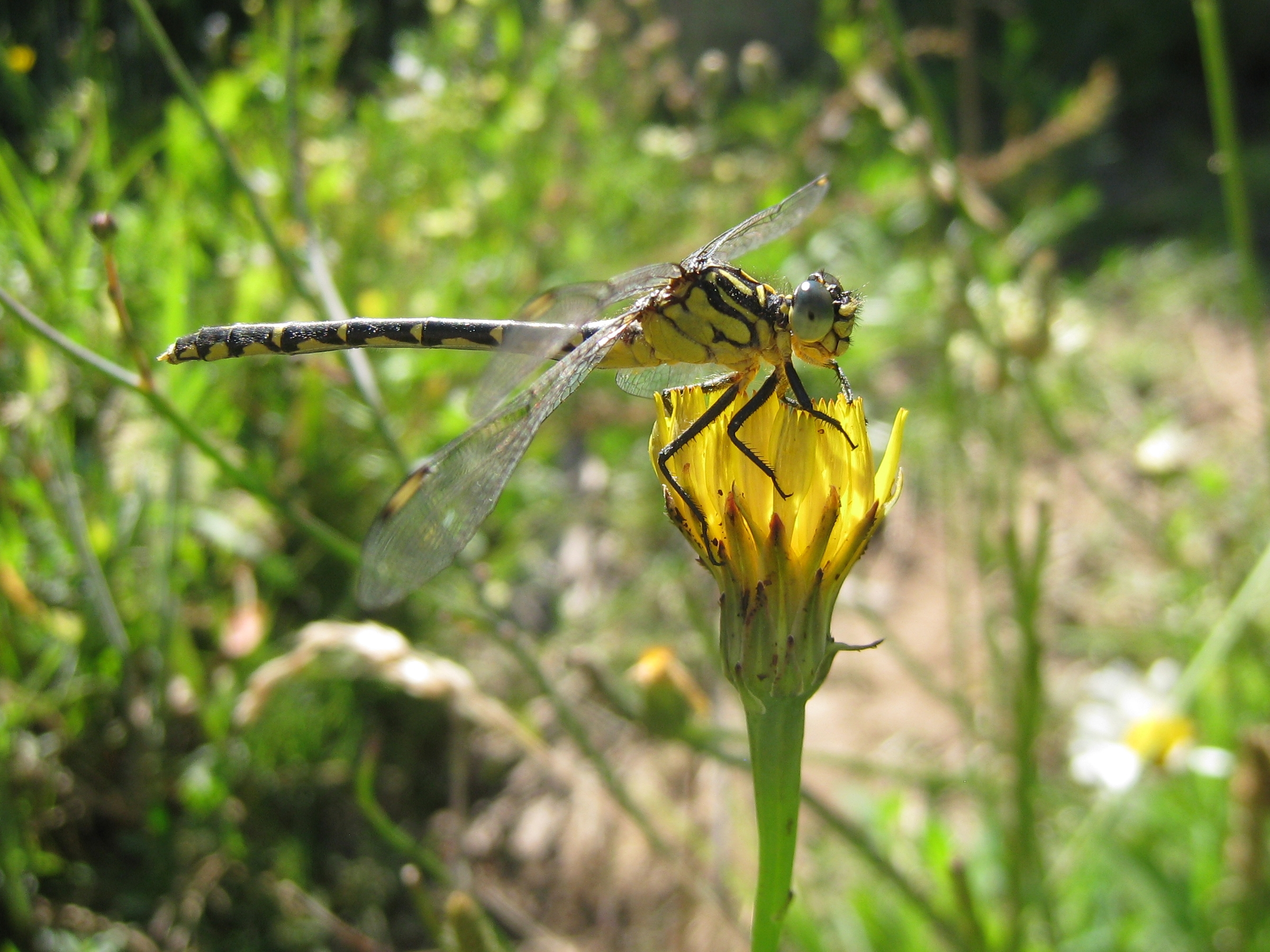
- Female
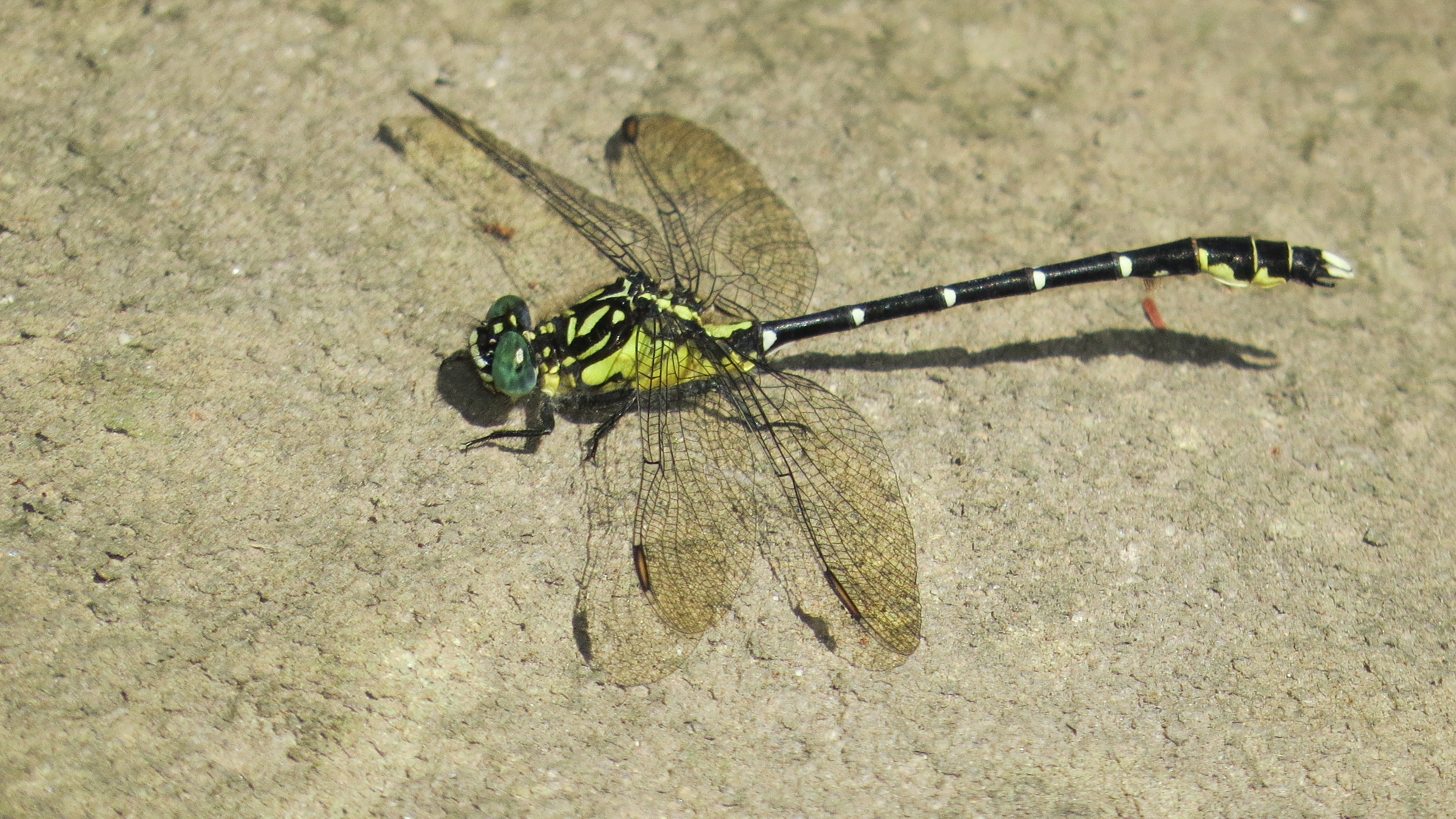
- Male

Conservation status
- Least Concern (IUCN 3.1)

Scientific classification
- Kingdom: Animalia
- Phylum: Arthropoda
- Clade: Pancrustacea
- Class: Insecta
- Order: Odonata
- Suborder: Anisoptera
- Family: Gomphidae
- Genus: Austrogomphus
- Subgenus: Austrogomphus
- Species: A. ochraceus

Binomial name
- Austrogomphus ochraceus (Selys, 1869)

Synonyms
- Hemigomphus ochraceus Selys, 1869

= Austrogomphus ochraceus =

Jade hunter

Species of dragonfly

Austrogomphus ochraceus, also known as Austrogomphus (Austrogomphus) ochraceus, is a species of dragonfly in the family Gomphidae, commonly known as the jade hunter. It inhabits streams, rivers and lakes in eastern Australia from north of Brisbane through New South Wales to Victoria.

Austrogomphus ochraceus is a tiny to medium-sized, black and yellow dragonfly.

== Etymology ==
The genus name Austrogomphus combines the prefix austro- (from Latin auster, meaning “south wind”, hence “southern”) with Gomphus, a genus name derived from Greek γόμφος (gomphos, “peg” or “nail”), alluding to the clubbed shape of the abdomen in males.

The species name ochraceus is derived from Greek ὤχρα (ōchra, "yellow ochre"), likely referring to the yellow markings on the thorax, legs, and abdomen.

== Gallery ==
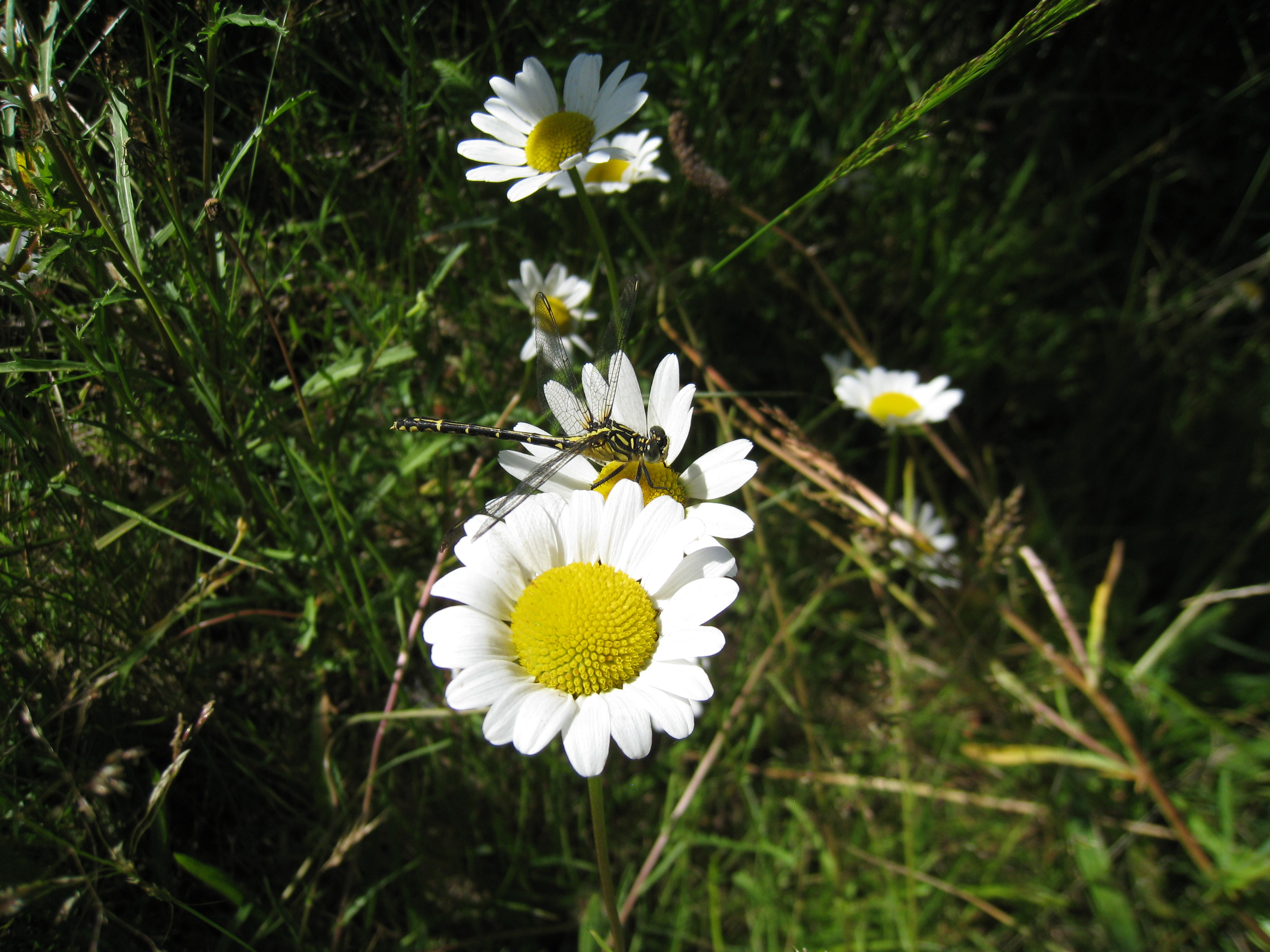
Female on daisy

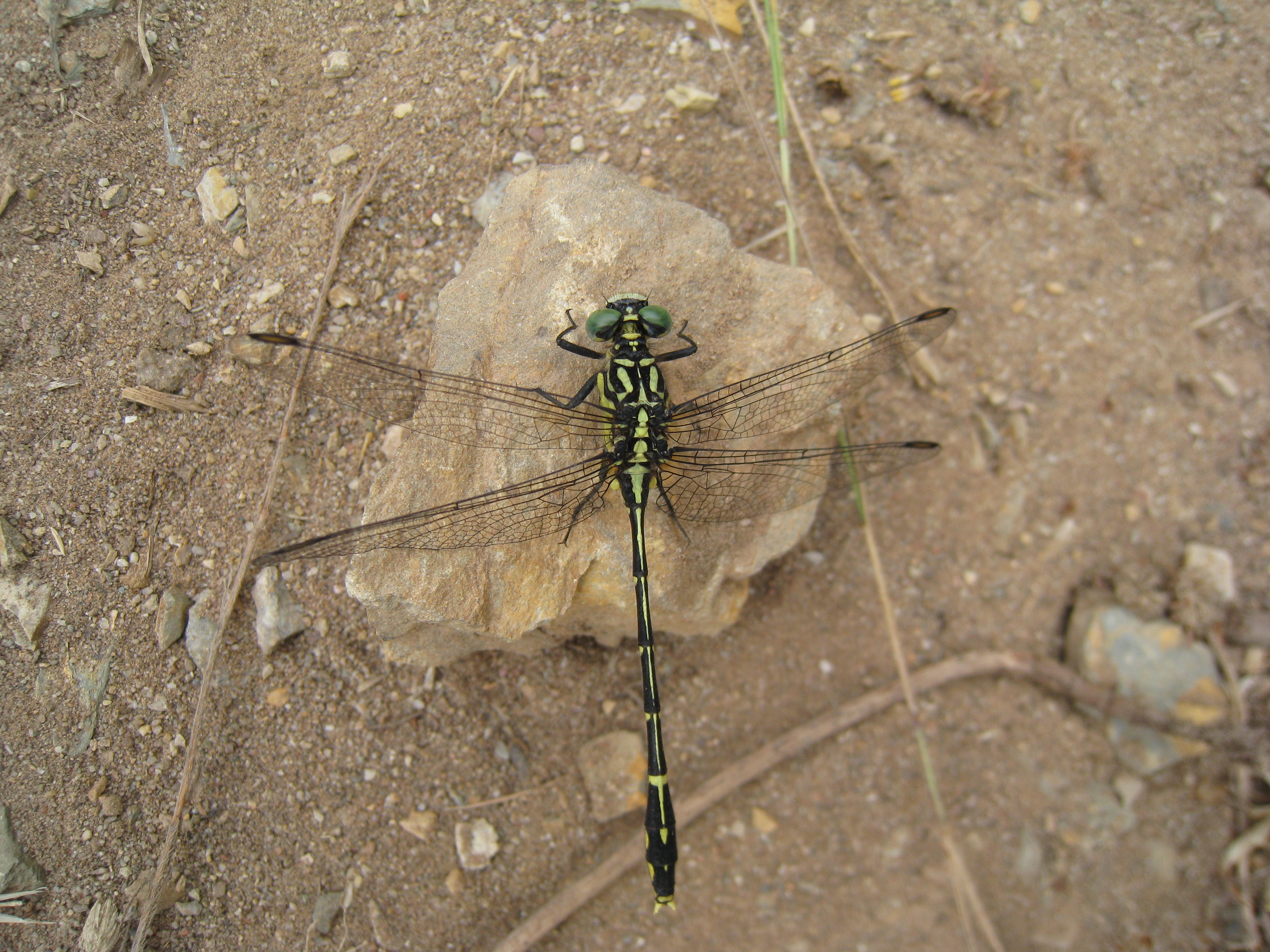
Male

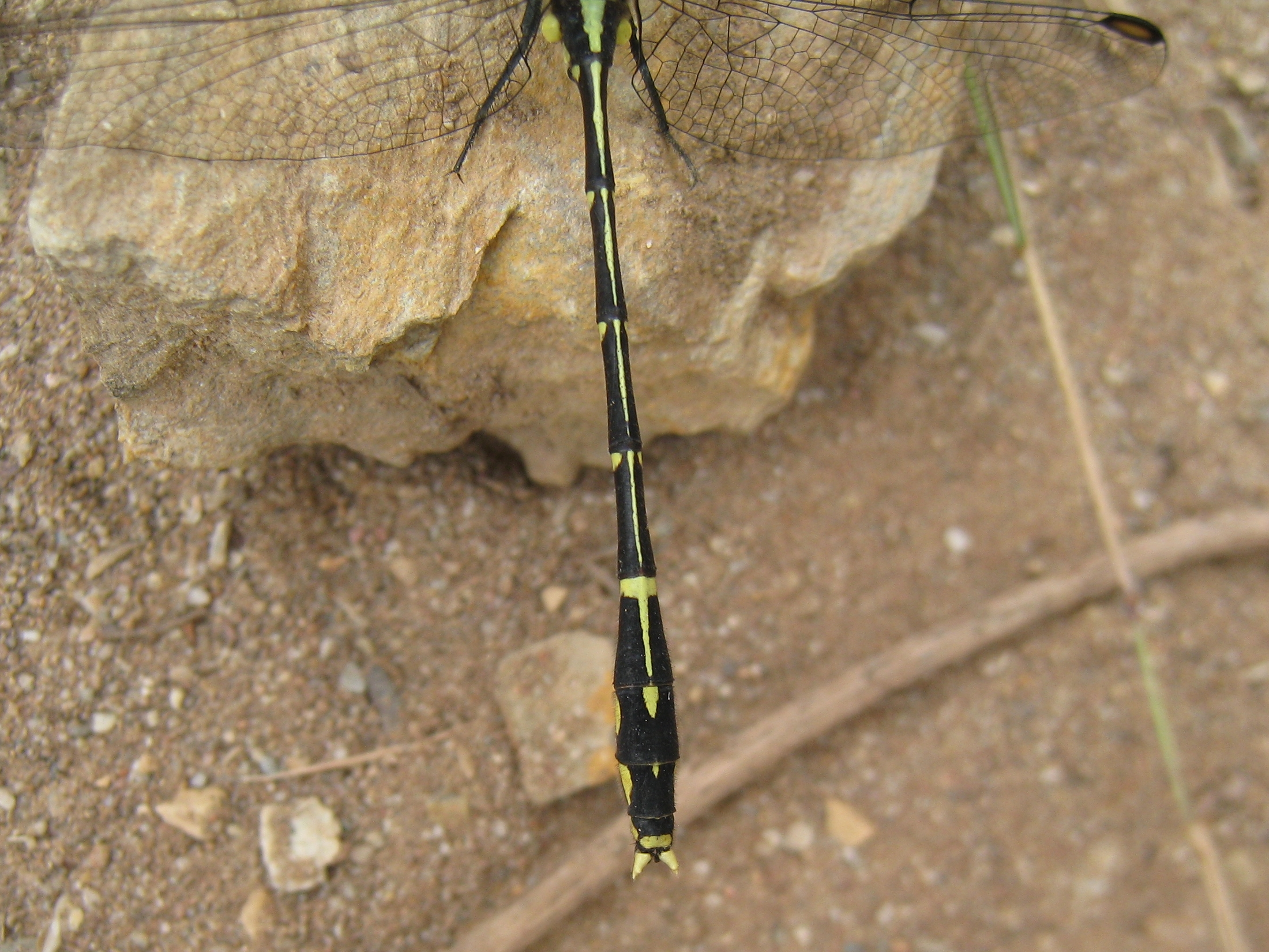
Male abdomen showing appendages

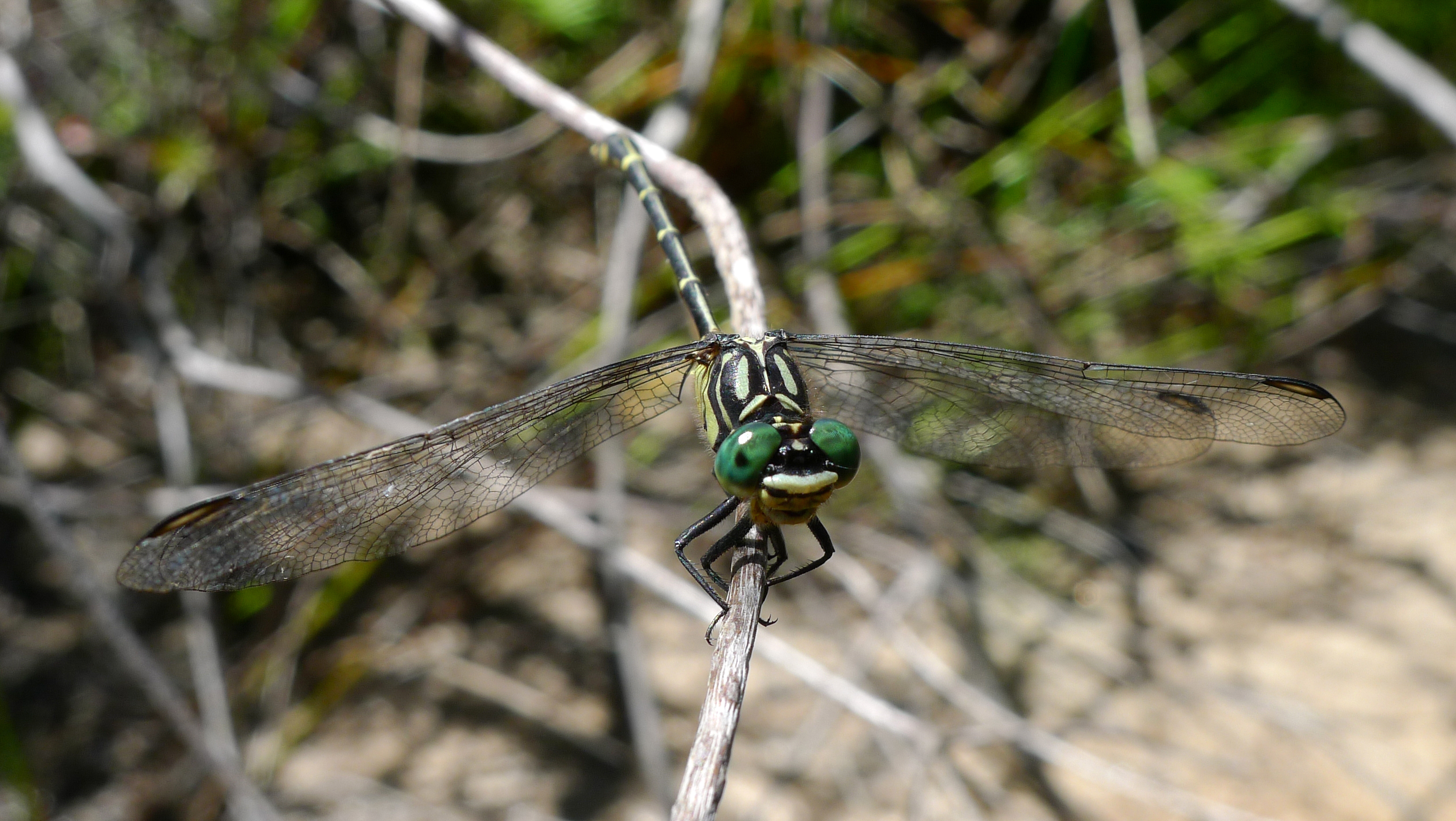
Face

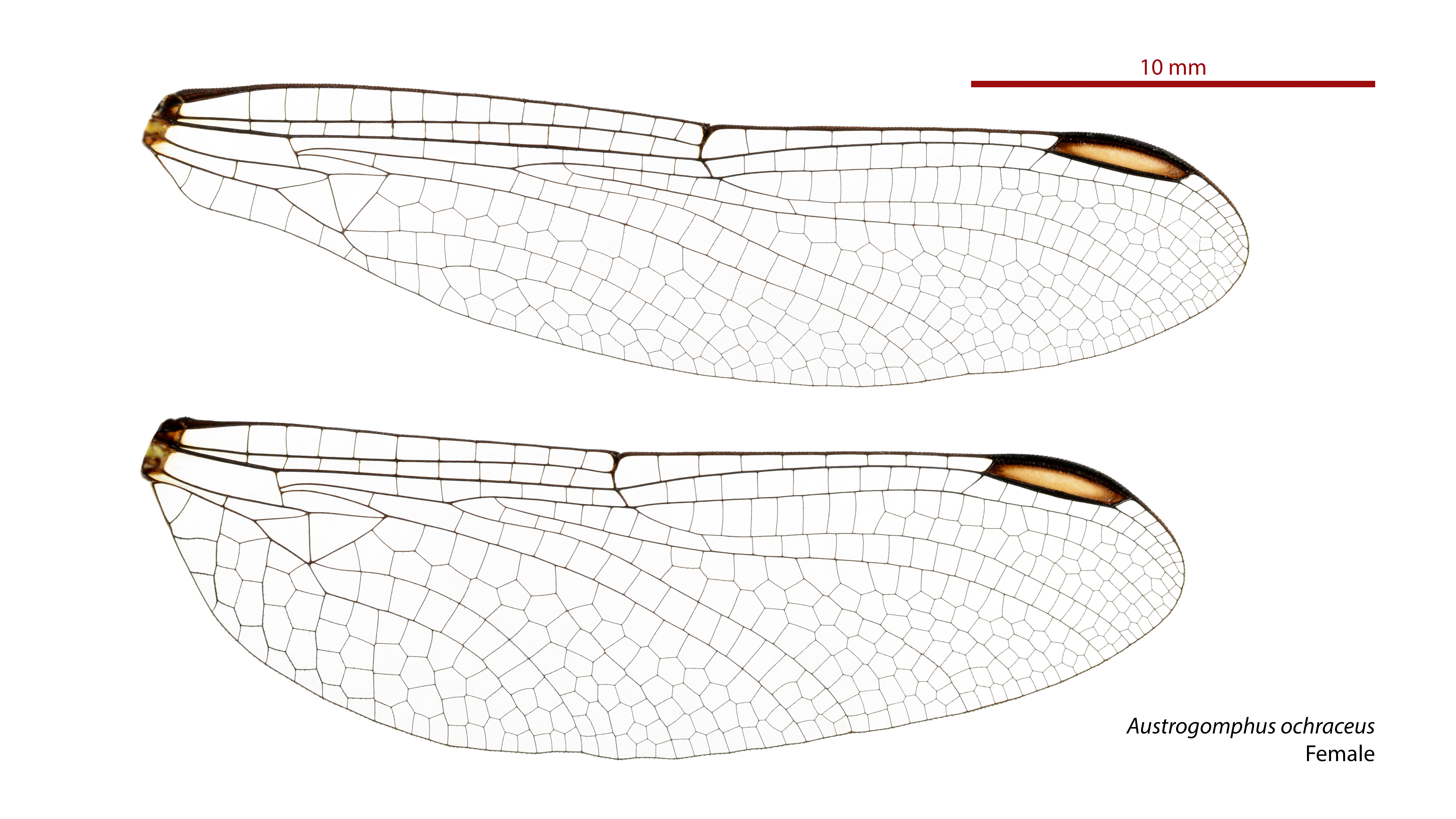
Female wings

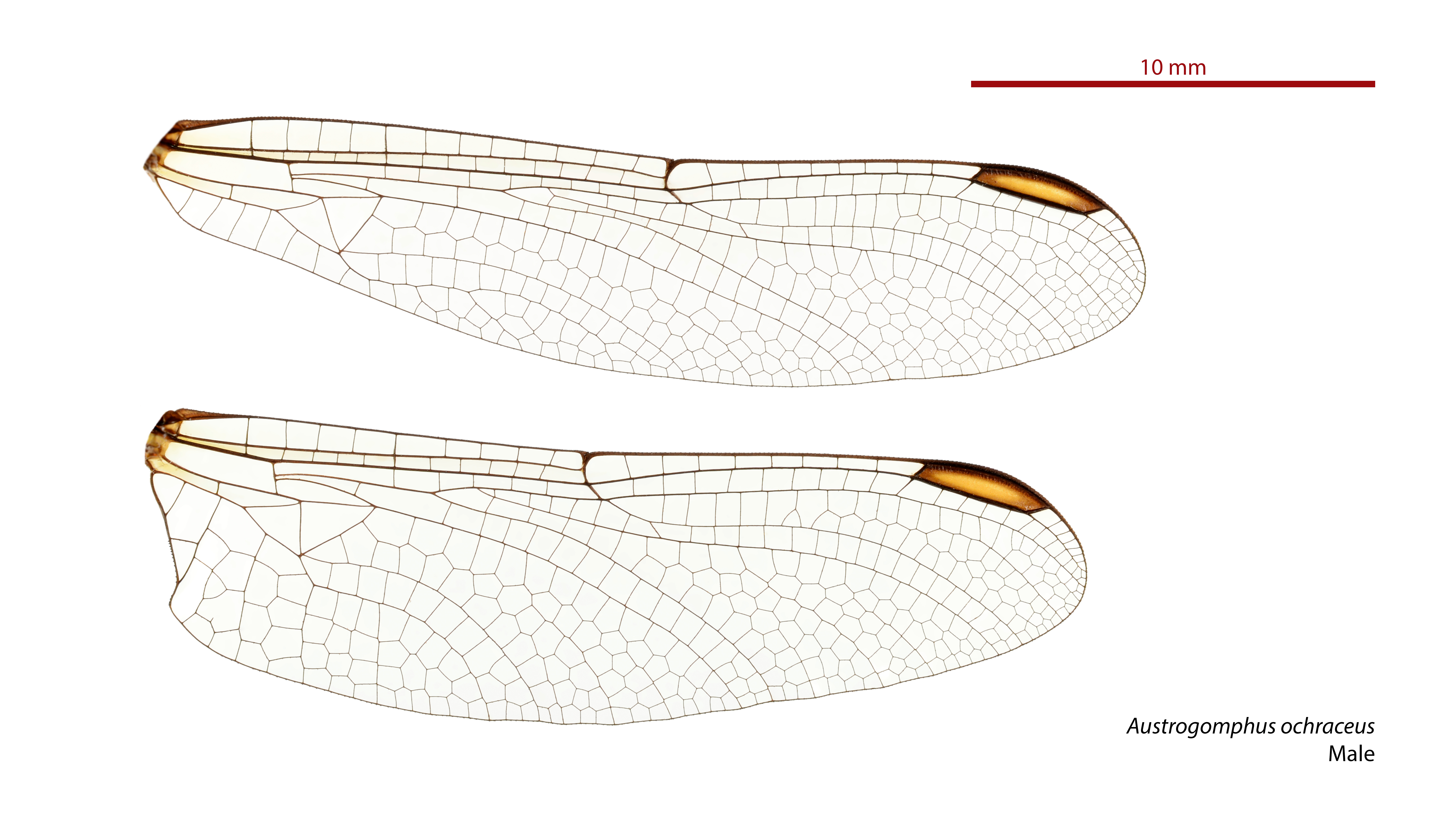
Male wings

== See also ==
- List of Odonata species of Australia
