= Phanogomphus sandrius =

Conservation status
- Vulnerable (IUCN 3.1)

Scientific classification
- Kingdom: Animalia
- Phylum: Arthropoda
- Class: Insecta
- Order: Odonata
- Infraorder: Anisoptera
- Family: Gomphidae
- Genus: Phanogomphus
- Species: P. sandrius

Binomial name
- Phanogomphus sandrius (Tennessen, 1983)

Species of dragonfly

Phanogomphus sandrius, the Tennessee clubtail, is a species of clubtail dragonflies in the family Gomphidae. It is found in the United States, in nine locations of central Tennessee.

The IUCN conservation status of Phanogomphus sandrius is "VU", vulnerable. The species faces a high risk of endangerment in the medium term, with a decreasing population. The IUCN status was reviewed in 2018. Phanogomphus sandrius was assessed as "endangered" in 1996 and "vulnerable" in 2007.

Phanogomphus sandrius was recently considered a member of the genus Gomphus, but in 2017 it became a member of the genus Phanogomphus when Phanogomphus was elevated from subgenus to genus rank.
