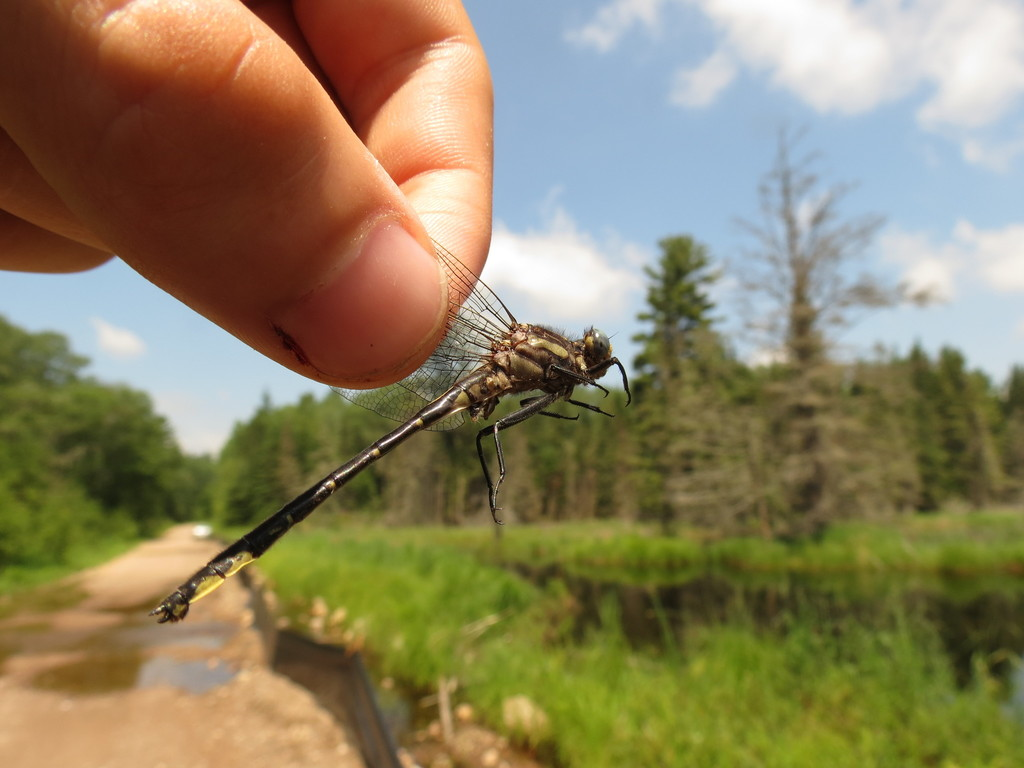

Scientific classification
- Kingdom: Animalia
- Phylum: Arthropoda
- Class: Insecta
- Order: Odonata
- Infraorder: Anisoptera
- Family: Gomphidae
- Genus: Phanogomphus
- Species: P. borealis

Binomial name
- Phanogomphus borealis (Needham, 1901)

= Phanogomphus borealis =

Species of dragonfly

Phanogomphus borealis, the beaverpond clubtail, is a species of clubtail dragonfly in the family Gomphidae. It is found in the northeastern United States and southeastern Canada.

Phanogomphus was formerly considered to be a subgenus of Gomphus, but phylogenetic studies have resulted in its promotion to genus rank.
