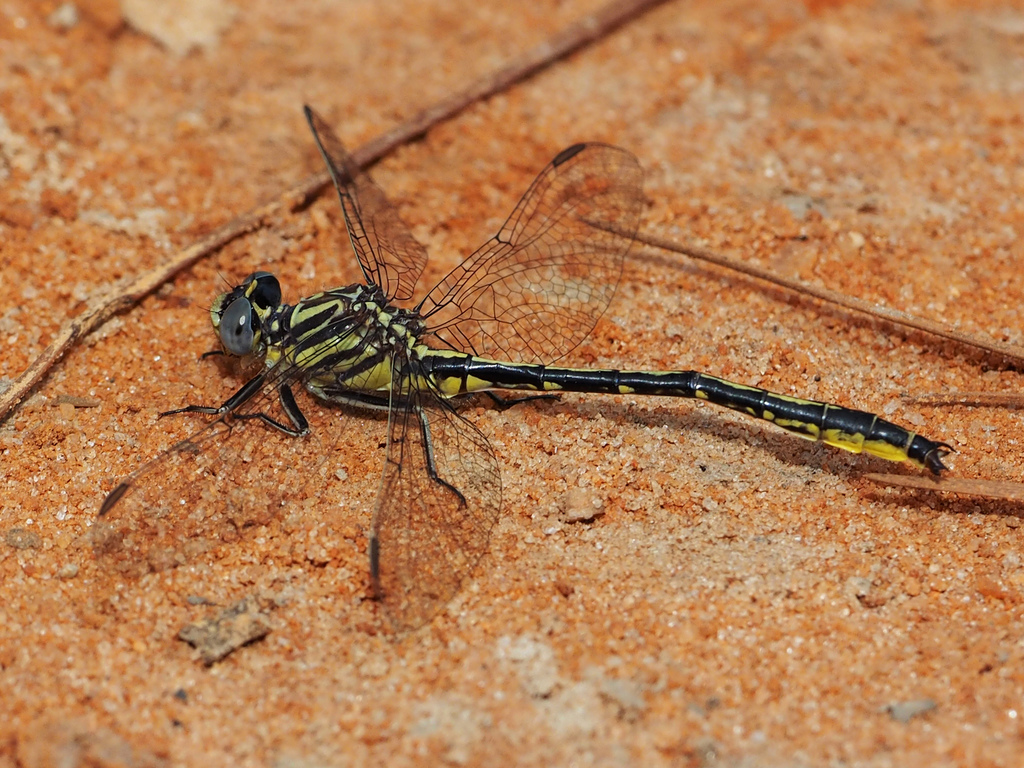

Conservation status
- Near Threatened (IUCN 3.1)

Scientific classification
- Kingdom: Animalia
- Phylum: Arthropoda
- Class: Insecta
- Order: Odonata
- Infraorder: Anisoptera
- Family: Gomphidae
- Genus: Phanogomphus
- Species: P. hodgesi

Binomial name
- Phanogomphus hodgesi (Needham, 1950)

= Phanogomphus hodgesi =

Species of dragonfly

Phanogomphus hodgesi, the Hodges' clubtail, is a species of clubtail in the family of dragonflies known as Gomphidae. It is found in Alabama, Florida, Louisiana, and Mississippi along the gulf coast of the United States.

Phanogomphus hodgesi was recently considered a member of the genus Gomphus, but in 2017 it became a member of the genus Phanogomphus when Phanogomphus was elevated from subgenus to genus rank.

The IUCN conservation status of Phanogomphus hodgesi is "NT", near threatened. The species may be considered threatened in the near future. The population is stable. The IUCN status was reviewed in 2018.

== Records ==
Extensive information and records regarding the Phanogomphus hodgesi are not currently available to the public. Dr. John Abott at the University of Alabama has received a $2.25 million dollar grant from the National Science Foundation to perform a four-year study alongside partners at University of Florida, Brigham Young University, the American Museum of Natural History and the Naturalis Biodiversity Center in Leiden, Netherlands to curate an extensive and complete database of information surrounding dragonflies and damselflies. Phanogomphus hodgesi will be a part of the GEODE (Genealogy and Ecology of Odonata) project, and hopefully in the future there will be public access to these records so more people can inquire about the evolution of Odonata species, their sensitivity to chemicals and water pollutants, wing shape, hunting behavior, and much more.

== Conservation status and actions ==
Phanogomphus hodgesi was labeled a "Species of Greatest Conservation Need" in Louisiana as of 2015. It is listed as "Near Threatened" in all other states it is found. These states have developed in depth plans regarding the conservation of the Phanogomphus hodgesi and similar species. The Alabama Department of Conservation and Natural Resources Division of Wildlife and Freshwater Fisheries had an action plan developed for the years 2015-2025 that included detailed information about statewide conservation issues and threats, conservation actions, the watch list, and much more. The action plan listed the five most common general threats as "habitat loss and fragmentation, loss of natural community integrity, impacts from disturbance, impacts from exotic species, and lack of adequate protection or information". These action plans will help states conserve the Phanogomphus hodgesi. Studies regarding shifts in dragonfly species richness across Europe have shown many large-scale changes An example of these changes is an overall decline in local diversity. There are currently no available studies on the impacts of environmental contaminants and habitat degradation on Phanogomphus hodgesi, but the studies done in Southern Europe and other parts of the world suggest this is a possibility for Phanogomphus hodgesi.
