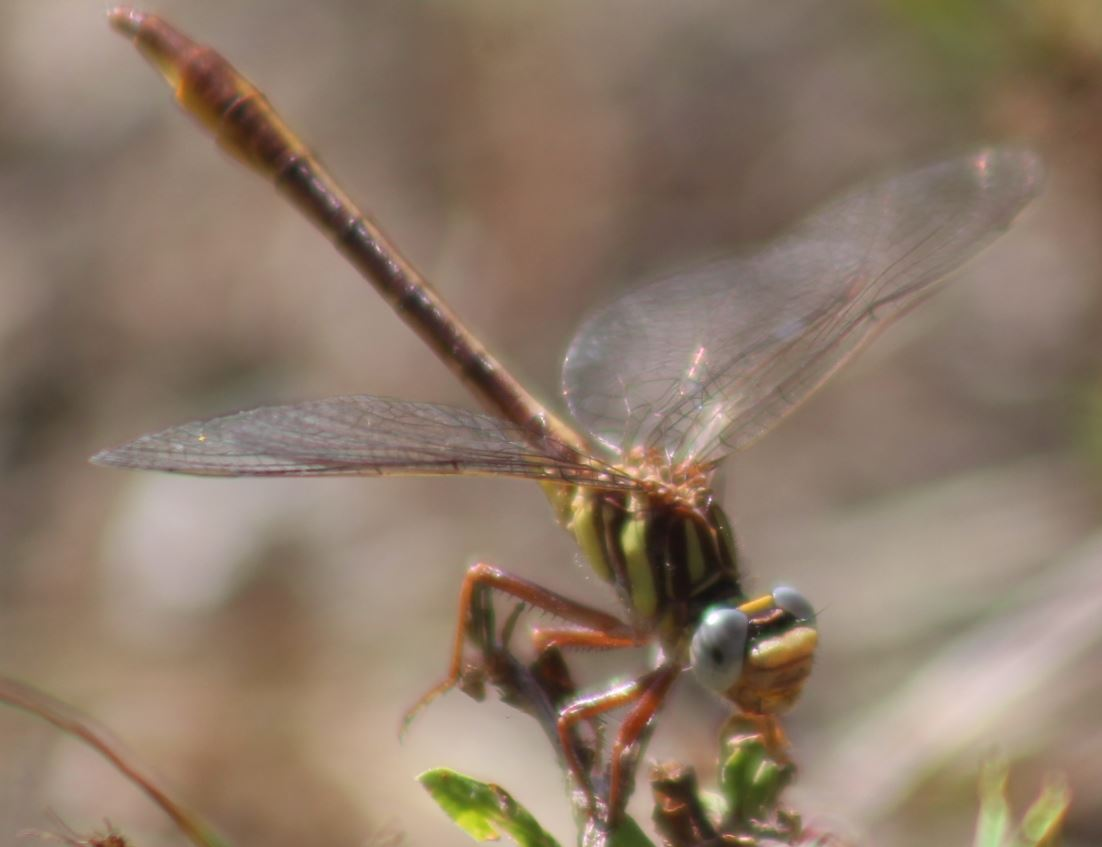
- A sandhill clubtail (subspecies P. c. cavillaris) in West Palm Beach, FL

Scientific classification
- Kingdom: Animalia
- Phylum: Arthropoda
- Class: Insecta
- Order: Odonata
- Infraorder: Anisoptera
- Family: Gomphidae
- Genus: Phanogomphus
- Species: P. cavillaris

Binomial name
- Phanogomphus cavillaris (Needham, 1902)

= Phanogomphus cavillaris =

Species of dragonfly

Phanogomphus cavillaris, the sandhill clubtail, is a species of clubtail dragonfly endemic to the Southeastern United States, found from Central Peninsular Florida to Southern Alabama as well as some of North Carolina. Adult individuals are found in scrub-like or other dry, sandy, lightly vegetated habitats located near a stream or lake. Just like most other gomphids, the sandhill clubtail has an enlarged end of the abdomen as well as eyes located farther apart than the average Anisoptera.

== Description and identification ==
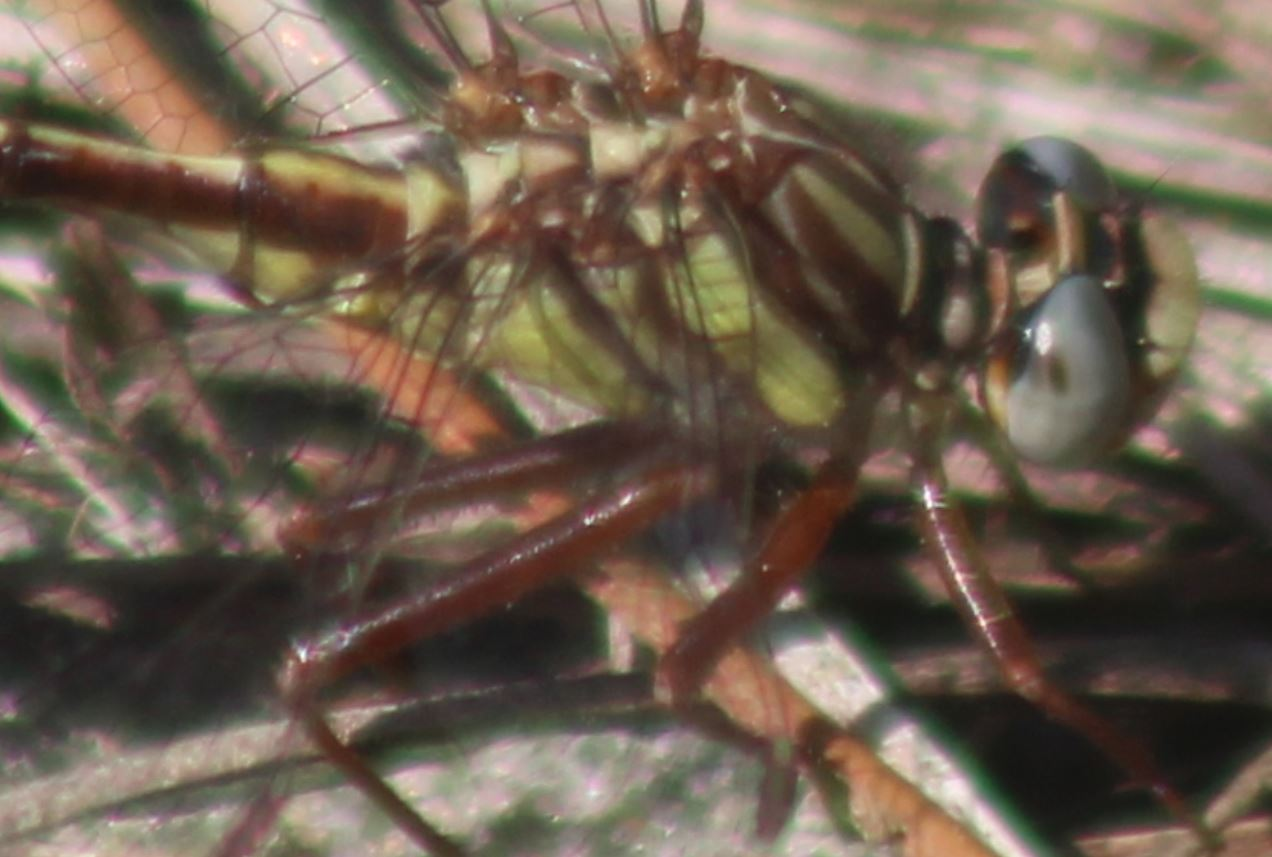
This photo shows the straight line between the eyes, rather than a curved and lobed one.

Overall, the sandhill clubtail has a very similar coloration to most other phanogomphids, a combination of yellow and dark patterning. The general patterning, as well as habitat preference, is nearly identical to the cypress clubtail (P. minutus). P. cavillaris has a straight occiput line (the line in between the eyes near the back of the head) and a dark band across the face, whereas P. minutus has a slightly curved occiput line that is lobed on the sides and an entirely pale yellowish face. While there are other morphological and microanatomical differences between the two, the shape of the occiput line is most useful in the field.

== Subspecies ==
There are two subspecies of sandhill clubtail, both of which are found in Southeastern North America.

- Phanogomphus cavillaris cavillaris - The type subspecies. Found in Peninsular Florida north of Lake Okeechobee as well as one slightly isolated population in West Palm Beach. Roughly the same shade of yellow throughout the body and the color on the tip of the abdomen being a dull yellowish or brownish color.
- Phanogomphus cavillaris brimleyi - Brimley's clubtail - Found in Florida Panhandle, Southern Alabama, as well as an extremely isolated population in Bladen County, North Carolina. Yellow on the tail much brighter and more noticeable than on the rest of the body.
