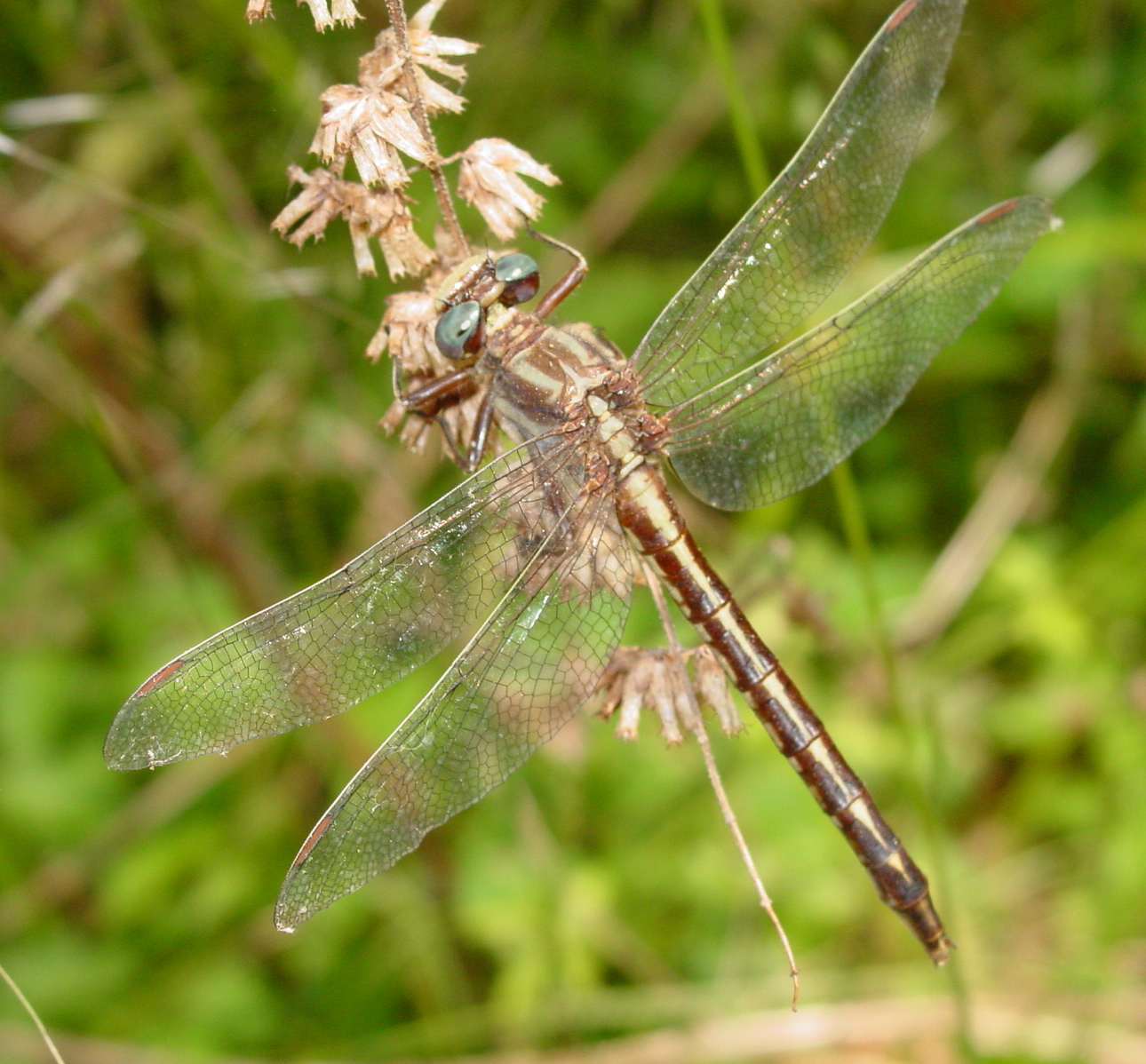
- Phanogomphus lividus

Scientific classification
- Kingdom: Animalia
- Phylum: Arthropoda
- Class: Insecta
- Order: Odonata
- Infraorder: Anisoptera
- Family: Gomphidae
- Genus: Phanogomphus; Carle, 1986

= Phanogomphus =

Genus of dragonflies

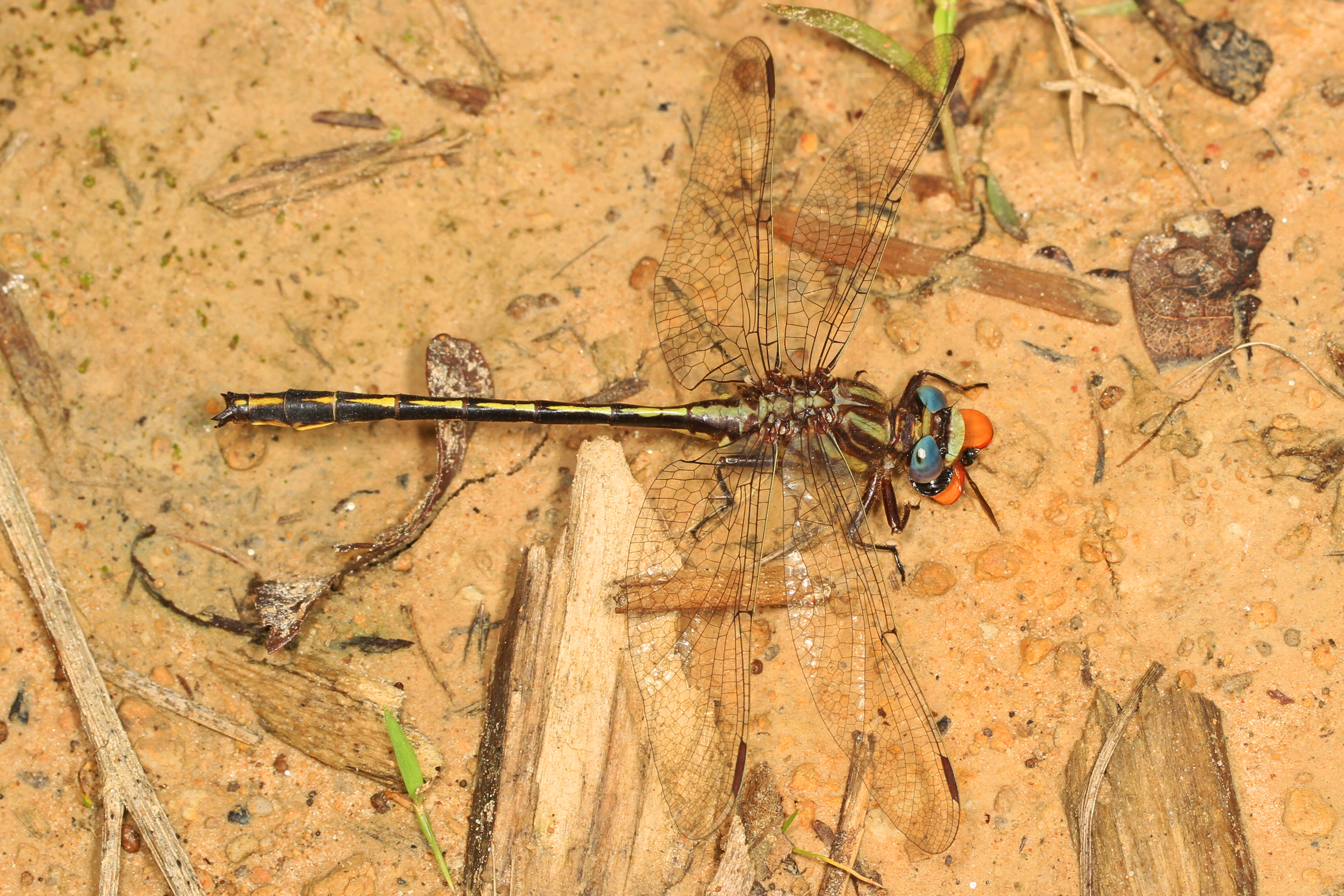
Phanogomphus oklahomensis

Phanogomphus is a genus of clubtails in the family Gomphidae found in North America. There are about 17 described species in Phanogomphus.

Phanogomphus was formerly considered a subgenus of Gomphus, but has recently been promoted to genus rank along with Stenogomphurus, Gomphurus and Hylogomphus.

== Species ==
These 17 species are members of the genus Phanogomphus.

=== Why is Phanogomphus different ===
The reason why this is Phanogomphus is because of its genetic lineage, its habitat (Clear fast running river, and bodies of water.) and its abnormal tail (This tail being club like).

- Phanogomphus australis (Needham, 1897) (clearlake clubtail)
- Phanogomphus borealis (Needham, 1901) (beaverpond clubtail)
- Phanogomphus cavillaris (Needham, 1902) (sandhill clubtail)
- Phanogomphus descriptus (Banks, 1896) (harpoon clubtail)
- Phanogomphus diminutus (Needham, 1950) (diminutive clubtail)
- Phanogomphus exilis (Selys, 1854) (lancet clubtail)
- Phanogomphus graslinellus (Walsh, 1862) (pronghorn clubtail)
- Phanogomphus hodgesi (Needham, 1950) (Hodges' clubtail)
- Phanogomphus kurilis (Hagen in Selys, 1858) (Pacific clubtail)
- Phanogomphus lividus (Selys, 1854) (ashy clubtail)
- Phanogomphus militaris (Hagen in Selys, 1858) (sulphur-tipped clubtail)
- Phanogomphus minutus (Rambur, 1842) (cypress clubtail)
- Phanogomphus oklahomensis (Pritchard, 1935) (Oklahoma clubtail)
- Phanogomphus quadricolor (Walsh, 1863) (rapids clubtail)
- Phanogomphus sandrius (Tennessen, 1983) (Tennessee clubtail)
- Phanogomphus spicatus (Hagen in Selys, 1854) (dusky clubtail)
- Phanogomphus westfalli (Carle & May, 1987) (Westfall's clubtail)
