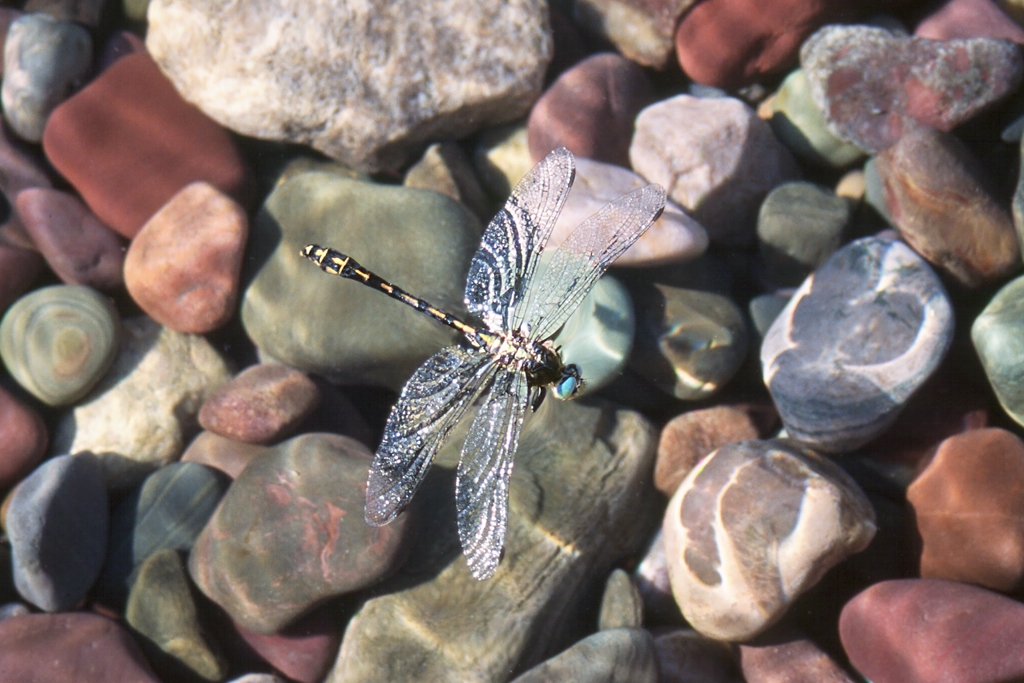

Scientific classification
- Kingdom: Animalia
- Phylum: Arthropoda
- Clade: Pancrustacea
- Class: Insecta
- Order: Odonata
- Infraorder: Anisoptera
- Family: Gomphidae
- Genus: Phanogomphus
- Species: P. graslinellus

Binomial name
- Phanogomphus graslinellus (Walsh, 1862)

= Phanogomphus graslinellus =

Pronghorn clubtail

Species of dragonfly

Phanogomphus graslinellus is a species of dragonfly in the family Gomphidae. This species is commonly known as the pronghorn clubtail.

Phanogomphus graslinellus was recently considered a member of the genus Gomphus, but in 2017 it became a member of the genus Phanogomphus when Phanogomphus was elevated from subgenus to genus rank.

== Characteristics ==
=== Adult ===
The pronghorn clubtail is a medium-sized dragonfly with a length of 1 7/8 to 2 1/8 inches (47 to 54 mm). Its face and its thorax are olive green, with the thorax marked with dark brown stripes. Its abdomen is dark brown to black and is marked along the top with a line of elongated, triangular-shaped marks varying in color from greenish to yellow. On the underside of the tip of its abdomen is marked with yellow and is swollen as in other clubtail species.

=== Nymph ===
The nymph of the pronghorn clubtail is large in size with a length of 1 1/8 inches (29 mm). Its abdomen is the widest at segment five. On the top of each abdominal segment two through nine has a curved hook, and there is a single, rear-facing spine on every side of abdominal segments seven through nine.

== Geographical range ==
- United States: (Arkansas • Colorado • Iowa • Idaho • Illinois • Indiana • Kansas • Kentucky • Michigan • Minnesota • Missouri • Montana • Nebraska • North Dakota • Nevada • Ohio • Oklahoma • South Dakota • Texas • Washington • Wisconsin)
- Canada: (Alberta • British Columbia • Manitoba • Ontario • Saskatchewan)

== Habitat ==
Pronghorn clubtails can be found near lakes, ponds and large or small slow streams.

== Flight season ==
The pronghorn clubtail is most active through early June to August. In Iowa this species has a flight season of late May to August.

== Diet ==
=== Adult ===
Pronghorn clubtails will feed on almost any soft-bodied flying insect such mosquitoes, flies, butterflies, moths, mayflies, and flying ants or termites.

=== Nymph ===
The nymph of this species feeds on a wide variety of aquatic insects, including mosquito larvae, other aquatic fly larvae, mayfly larvae, and freshwater shrimp. They will sometimes eat small fish and tadpoles.

== Ecology ==
Pronghorn clubtail nymphs can be very selective in their habitat choice and will often occur only in certain stretches of a particular stream, lake, or pond. They burrow into the sand or mud, leaving the upturned tip of their abdomen exposed. This process will allow them to breathe while buried by pumping water in and out of the tip of its abdomen. Nymphs will emerge as adults at the edge of the water just before sunrise. Although records of this species are sparse, adults are believed to fly from early June to August. Pronghorn clubtails can't tolerate cooler temperatures and they are rarely seen flying on cool or cloudy days. The hunting will occur from rocks or twigs where it will perch.

== Reproduction ==
After both genders are one mating, the female flies singly, without the male attached, to lay her eggs by dipping the tip of her abdomen in rivers, lakes, or slow streams while hovering above it.

== Similar species ==
The plains clubtail is similar to the pronghorn clubtail and may not always be reliably separated. Some plains clubtails are distinguished by the largely fused antehumeral and humeral stripes. the male plains clubtail has a cerci that lacks teeth laterally. The Ozark clubtail has segment 9 black dorsally or with at most a small pale yellow spot. The sulphur-tipped clubtail is more paler, its yellow laterally on segment 7 and has pale yellow on segment 9 is only narrowly separated dorsally and laterally.

== Conservation ==
Pronghorn clubtail populations are widespread, abundant, and secure.
