= Gomphus lucasii =

Conservation status
- Vulnerable (IUCN 3.1)

Scientific classification
- Kingdom: Animalia
- Phylum: Arthropoda
- Class: Insecta
- Order: Odonata
- Infraorder: Anisoptera
- Family: Gomphidae
- Genus: Gomphus
- Species: G. lucasii

Binomial name
- Gomphus lucasii Selys, 1849

Species of dragonfly

Gomphus lucasii is a species of dragonfly in the family Gomphidae. It is found in Algeria and Tunisia. Its natural habitat is rivers. It is threatened by habitat loss.
