= Stenogomphurus =

Scientific classification
- Kingdom: Animalia
- Phylum: Arthropoda
- Class: Insecta
- Order: Odonata
- Infraorder: Anisoptera
- Family: Gomphidae
- Genus: Stenogomphurus; Carle, 1986

Genus of dragonflies

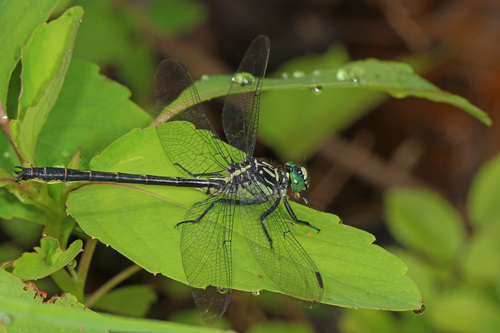
Stegnomphurus rogersi

Stenogomphurus is a genus of clubtails in the family of dragonflies known as Gomphidae. There are at least two described species in Stenogomphurus, both found in North America.

Stenogomphurus was formerly considered a subgenus of Gomphus, but has recently been promoted to genus rank along with Phanogomphus, Gomphurus and Hylogomphus.

== Species ==
These two species belong to the genus Stenogomphurus:

- Stenogomphurus consanguis (Selys, 1879) (Cherokee clubtail)
- Stenogomphurus rogersi (Gloyd, 1936) (sable clubtail)
