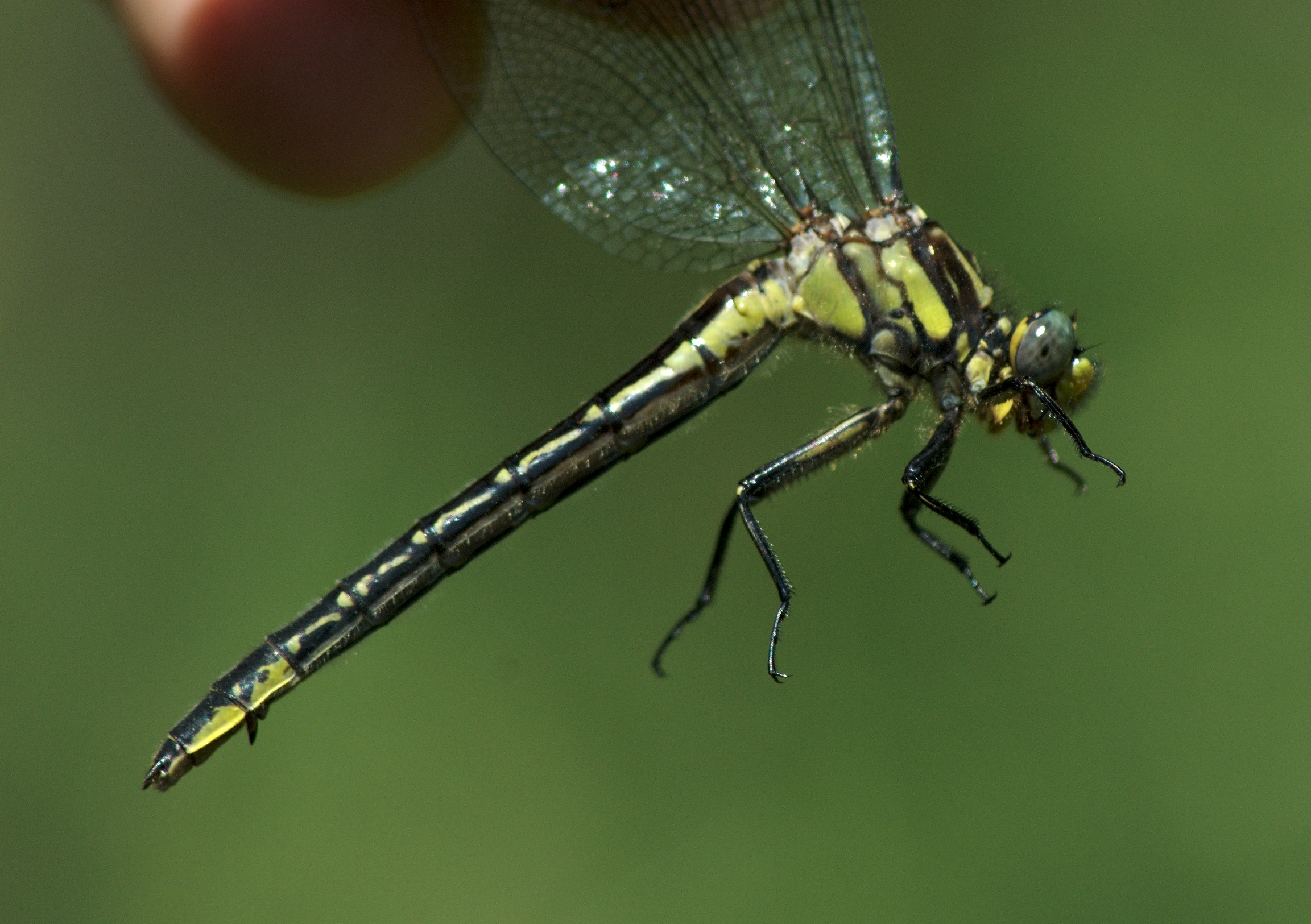

Scientific classification
- Kingdom: Animalia
- Phylum: Arthropoda
- Class: Insecta
- Order: Odonata
- Infraorder: Anisoptera
- Family: Gomphidae
- Genus: Phanogomphus
- Species: P. descriptus

Binomial name
- Phanogomphus descriptus (Banks, 1896)

= Phanogomphus descriptus =

Species of dragonfly

Phanogomphus descriptus, the harpoon clubtail, is a species of clubtail dragonfly in the family Gomphidae. It is found in eastern North America.

Phanogomphus was formerly considered to be a subgenus of Gomphus, but phylogenetic studies have resulted in its promotion to genus rank.
