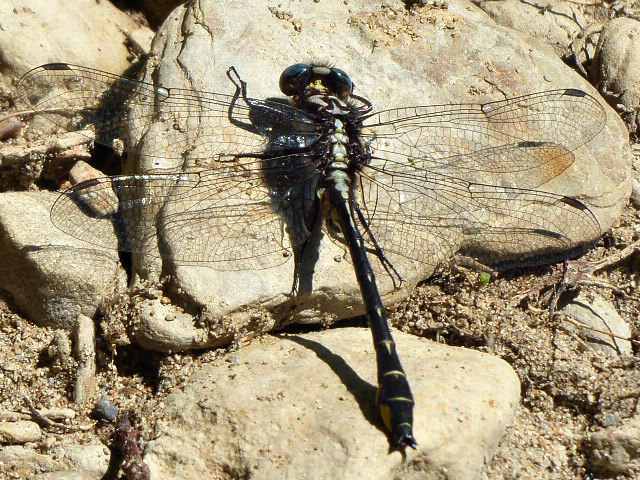

Conservation status
- Least Concern (IUCN 3.1)

Scientific classification
- Kingdom: Animalia
- Phylum: Arthropoda
- Class: Insecta
- Order: Odonata
- Infraorder: Anisoptera
- Family: Gomphidae
- Genus: Phanogomphus
- Species: P. quadricolor

Binomial name
- Phanogomphus quadricolor (Walsh, 1863)

Synonyms
- Gomphus quadricolor

= Phanogomphus quadricolor =

Species of dragonfly

Phanogomphus quadricolor, the rapids clubtail, is a species of dragonfly in the family Gomphidae. It is found in eastern North America. Its natural habitat is medium to large rivers. It is threatened by degrading habitat quality.

The name Rapids clubtail, comes from its look and habitats. rap·id /ˈrapəd/ means a fast-flowing and turbulent part of the course of a river. The Club tail comes from there tail looking like a club

This is a small dragonfly: 1.6 to 1.8 inches (41 to 46 mm) in length. Adults have bluish-green eyes on a yellowish-green face. The body has brownish-black and yellowish-green stripes and its wings are transparent.

Adults feed on small flying insects.

The aquatic larvae hatch in slow-moving pools.

Phanogomphus quadricolor was recently considered a member of the genus Gomphus, but in 2017 it became a member of the genus Phanogomphus when Phanogomphus was elevated from subgenus to genus rank.
