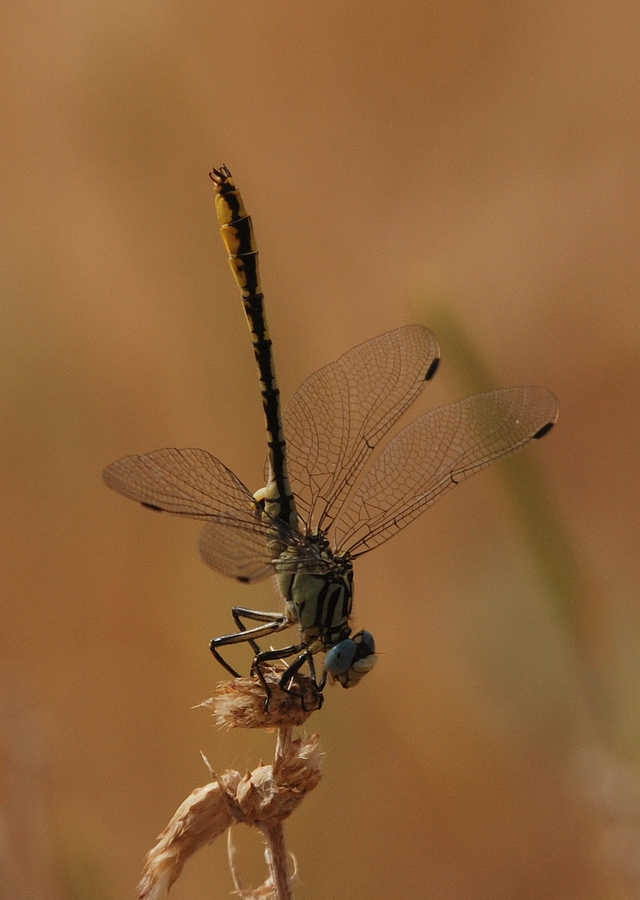

Conservation status
- Least Concern (IUCN 3.1)

Scientific classification
- Kingdom: Animalia
- Phylum: Arthropoda
- Class: Insecta
- Order: Odonata
- Infraorder: Anisoptera
- Family: Gomphidae
- Genus: Gomphus
- Species: G. schneiderii

Binomial name
- Gomphus schneiderii Selys, 1850

= Gomphus schneiderii =

Species of dragonfly

Gomphus schneiderii, the Turkish clubtail, is a species of dragonfly. It is closely related to the Common Clubtail (Gomphus vulgatissimus) and has sometimes been treated as a subspecies of vulgatissimus. It is distributed in the southern Balkan Peninsula, Turkey and Iran overlapping with vulgatissimus in eastern Transcaucasia. The two can be distinguished by examination of the male genitalia.
