= Stenogomphurus consanguis =

Conservation status
- Least Concern (IUCN 3.1)

Scientific classification
- Kingdom: Animalia
- Phylum: Arthropoda
- Class: Insecta
- Order: Odonata
- Infraorder: Anisoptera
- Family: Gomphidae
- Genus: Stenogomphurus
- Species: S. consanguis

Binomial name
- Stenogomphurus consanguis (Selys, 1879)

Synonyms
- Gomphus consanguis Selys, 1879; Gomphurus consanguis (Selys, 1879)

Species of dragonfly

Stenogomphurus consanguis, the Cherokee clubtail, is a species of clubtail dragonfly in the family Gomphidae. It is endemic to the southeastern United States, found in small rivers and streams.

The IUCN conservation status of Stenogomphurus consanguis is "LC", least concern, with no immediate threat to the species' survival. The IUCN status was reviewed in 2018. The species had a Red List assessment of "rare" from 1986 to 1994, "vulnerable" in 1996, and "endangered" in 2007. There are about 30 known populations of Stenogomphurus consanguis in the southeastern United States, most with fewer than 50 adults.
