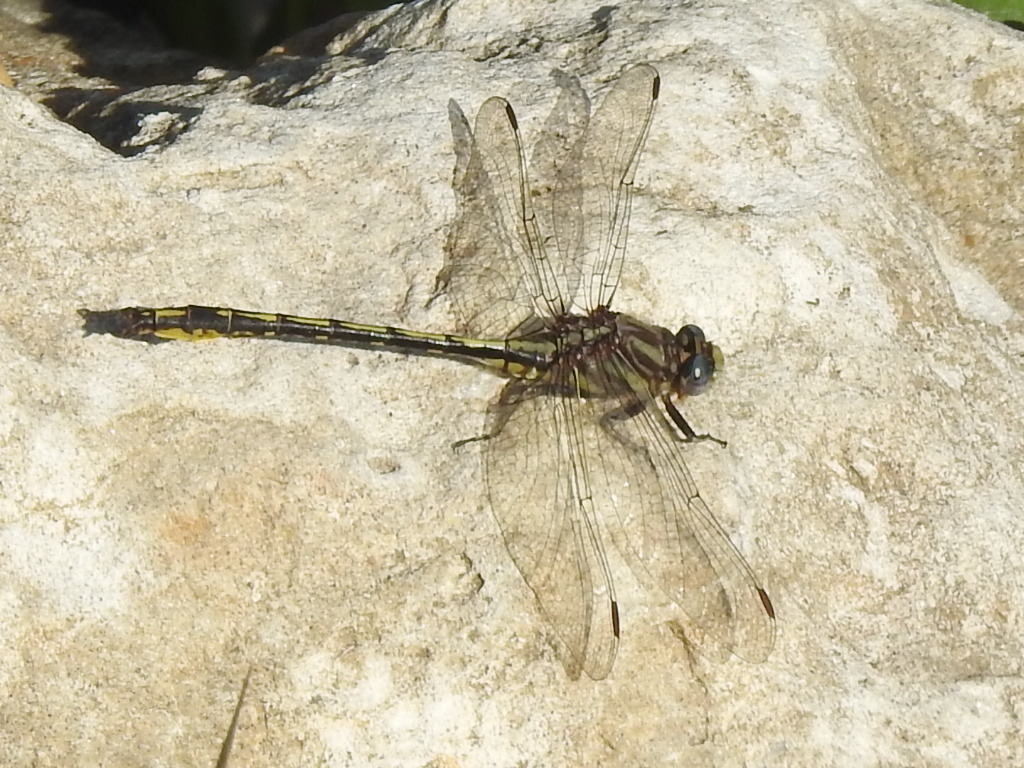
- Phanogomphus oklahomensis, Oklahoma clubtail, Texas

Conservation status
- Least Concern (IUCN 3.1)

Scientific classification
- Kingdom: Animalia
- Phylum: Arthropoda
- Clade: Pancrustacea
- Class: Insecta
- Order: Odonata
- Suborder: Anisoptera
- Family: Gomphidae
- Genus: Phanogomphus
- Species: P. oklahomensis

Binomial name
- Phanogomphus oklahomensis (Pritchad, 1935)

= Phanogomphus oklahomensis =

Species of clubtail

Phanogomphus oklahomensis, the Oklahoma clubtail, is a species of clubtail in the dragonfly family Gomphidae. It is found in the south central United States.

The IUCN conservation status of Phanogomphus oklahomensis is "LC", least concern, with no immediate threat to the species' survival. The IUCN status was assessed in 2016.
