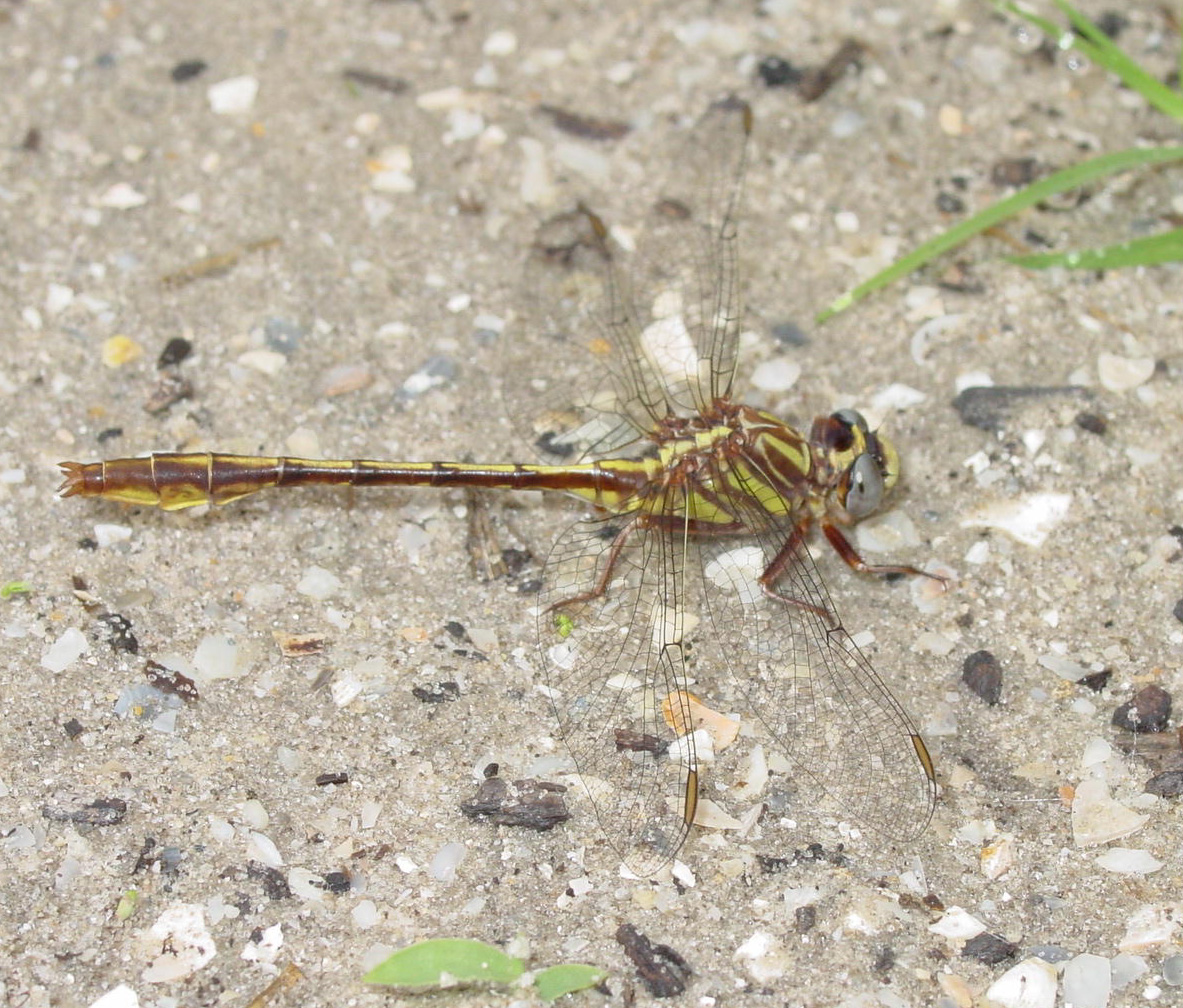

Scientific classification
- Domain: Eukaryota
- Kingdom: Animalia
- Phylum: Arthropoda
- Class: Insecta
- Order: Odonata
- Infraorder: Anisoptera
- Family: Gomphidae
- Genus: Phanogomphus
- Species: P. minutus

Binomial name
- Phanogomphus minutus (Rambur, 1842)

= Phanogomphus minutus =

Species of dragonfly

Phanogomphus minutus, the cypress clubtail, is a species of clubtail dragonfly in the family Gomphidae. It is found in North America.

Phanogomphus was formerly considered to be a subgenus of Gomphus, but phylogenetic studies have resulted in its promotion to genus rank.
