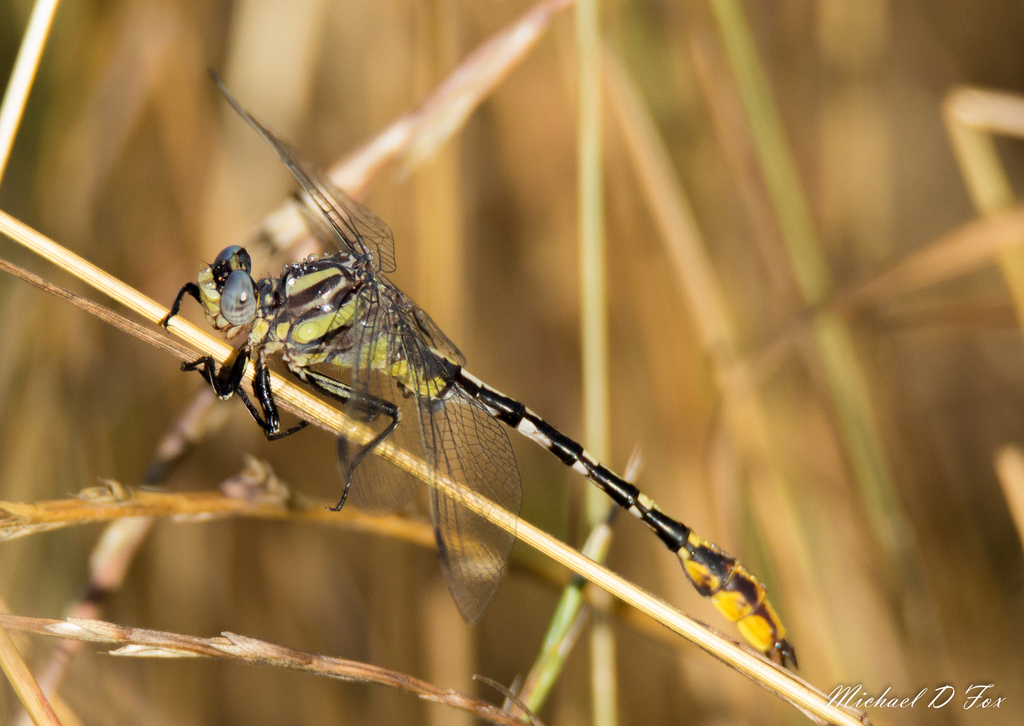

Conservation status
- Least Concern (IUCN 3.1)

Scientific classification
- Kingdom: Animalia
- Phylum: Arthropoda
- Class: Insecta
- Order: Odonata
- Infraorder: Anisoptera
- Family: Gomphidae
- Genus: Phanogomphus
- Species: P. militaris

Binomial name
- Phanogomphus militaris (Hagen in Selys, 1858)

= Phanogomphus militaris =

Species of dragonfly

Phanogomphus militaris, the sulphur-tipped clubtail, is a species of clubtail dragonfly in the family Gomphidae. It is found in central North America.

Phanogomphus militaris was recently considered a member of the genus Gomphus, but in 2017 it became a member of the genus Phanogomphus when Phanogomphus was elevated from subgenus to genus rank.

The IUCN conservation status of Phanogomphus militaris is "LC", least concern, with no immediate threat to the species' survival. The population is stable. The IUCN status was reviewed in 2018.

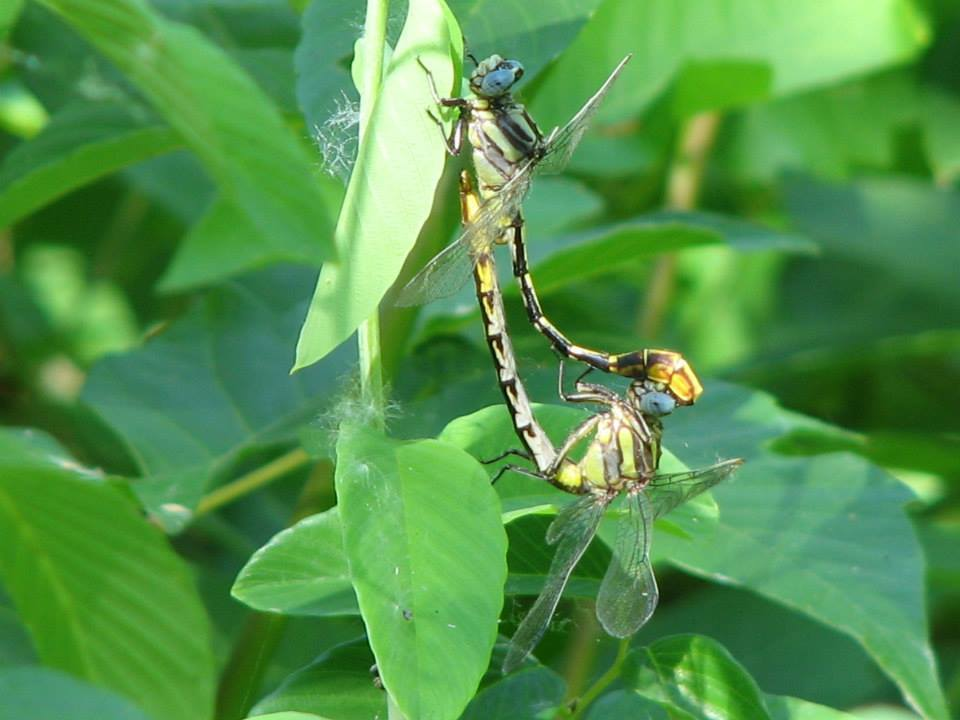
pair copulating
