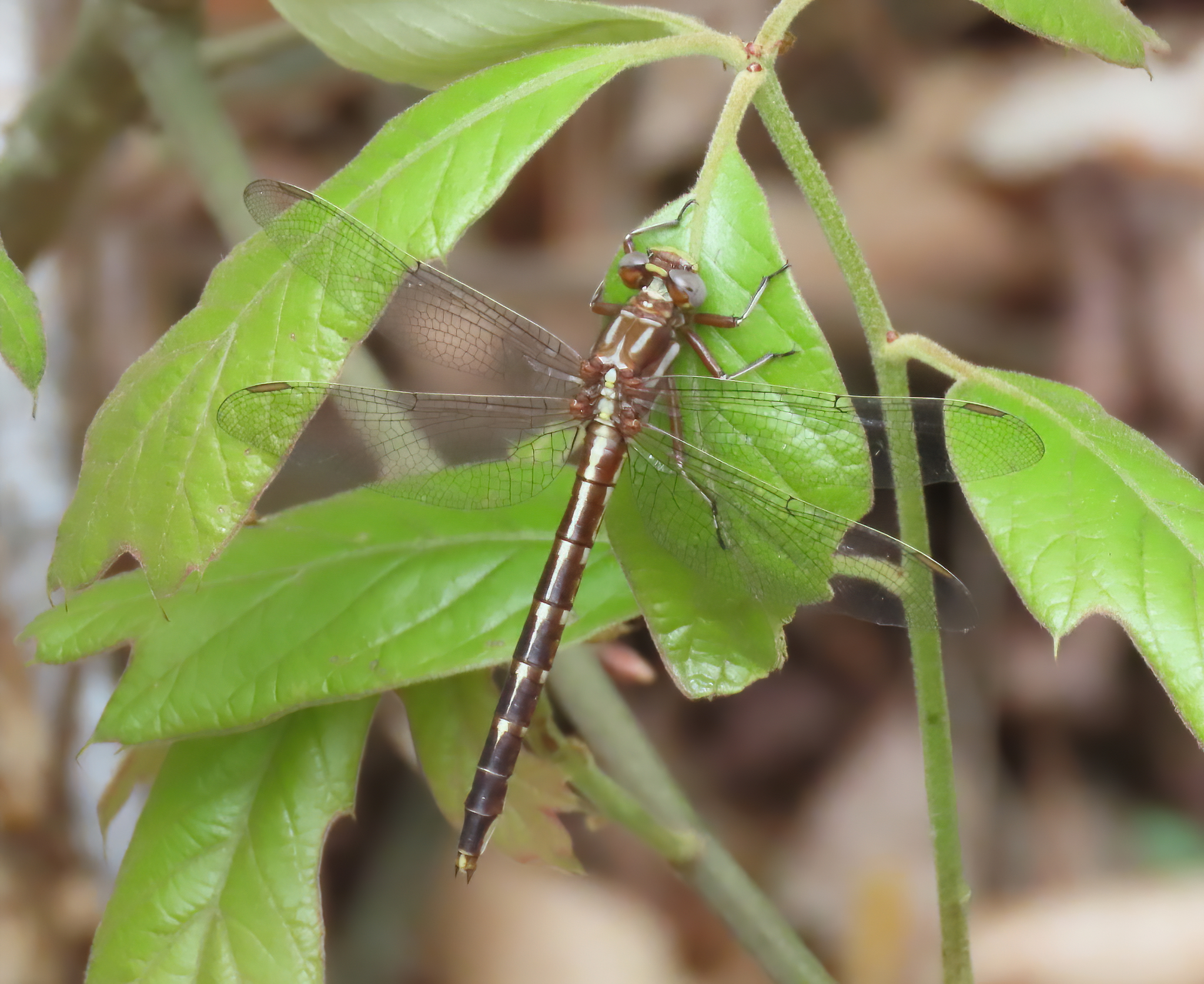
- Phanogomphus lividus, Virginia

Conservation status
- Least Concern (IUCN 3.1)

Scientific classification
- Kingdom: Animalia
- Phylum: Arthropoda
- Class: Insecta
- Order: Odonata
- Infraorder: Anisoptera
- Family: Gomphidae
- Genus: Phanogomphus
- Species: P. lividus

Binomial name
- Phanogomphus lividus (Selys, 1854)

= Phanogomphus lividus =

Species of dragonfly

Phanogomphus lividus, the ashy clubtail, is a species of clubtail in the dragonfly family Gomphidae.

The IUCN conservation status of Phanogomphus lividus is "LC", least concern, with no immediate threat to the species' survival. The IUCN status was assessed in 2014.
