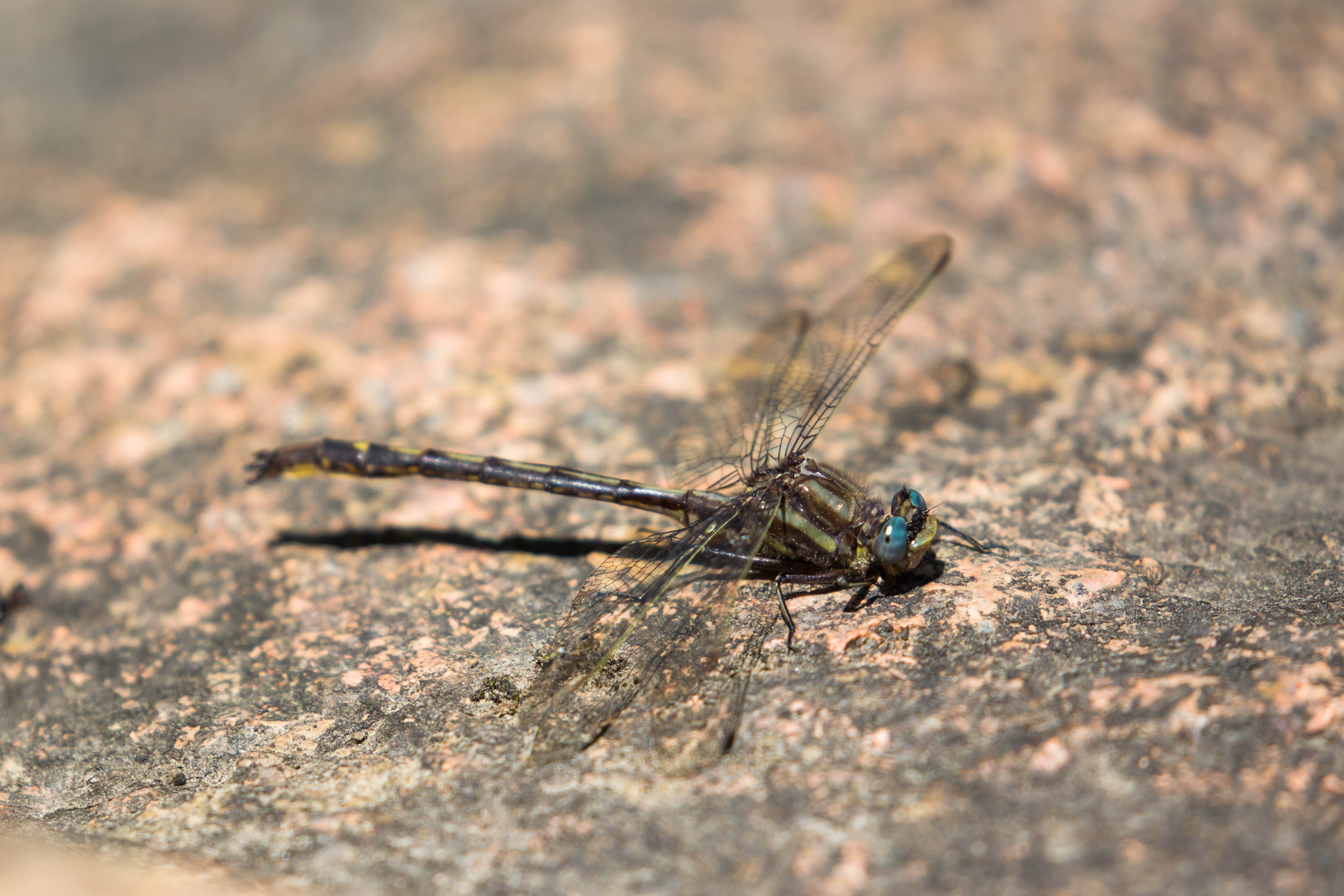

Conservation status
- Least Concern (IUCN 3.1)

Scientific classification
- Kingdom: Animalia
- Phylum: Arthropoda
- Class: Insecta
- Order: Odonata
- Infraorder: Anisoptera
- Family: Gomphidae
- Genus: Phanogomphus
- Species: P. spicatus

Binomial name
- Phanogomphus spicatus (Hagen in Selys, 1854)

= Phanogomphus spicatus =

Dusky clubtail

Species of dragonfly

Phanogomphus spicatus, the dusky clubtail, is a species of clubtail in the dragonfly family Gomphidae.

The IUCN conservation status of Phanogomphus spicatus is "LC", least concern, with no immediate threat to the species' survival. The IUCN status was assessed in 2014.
