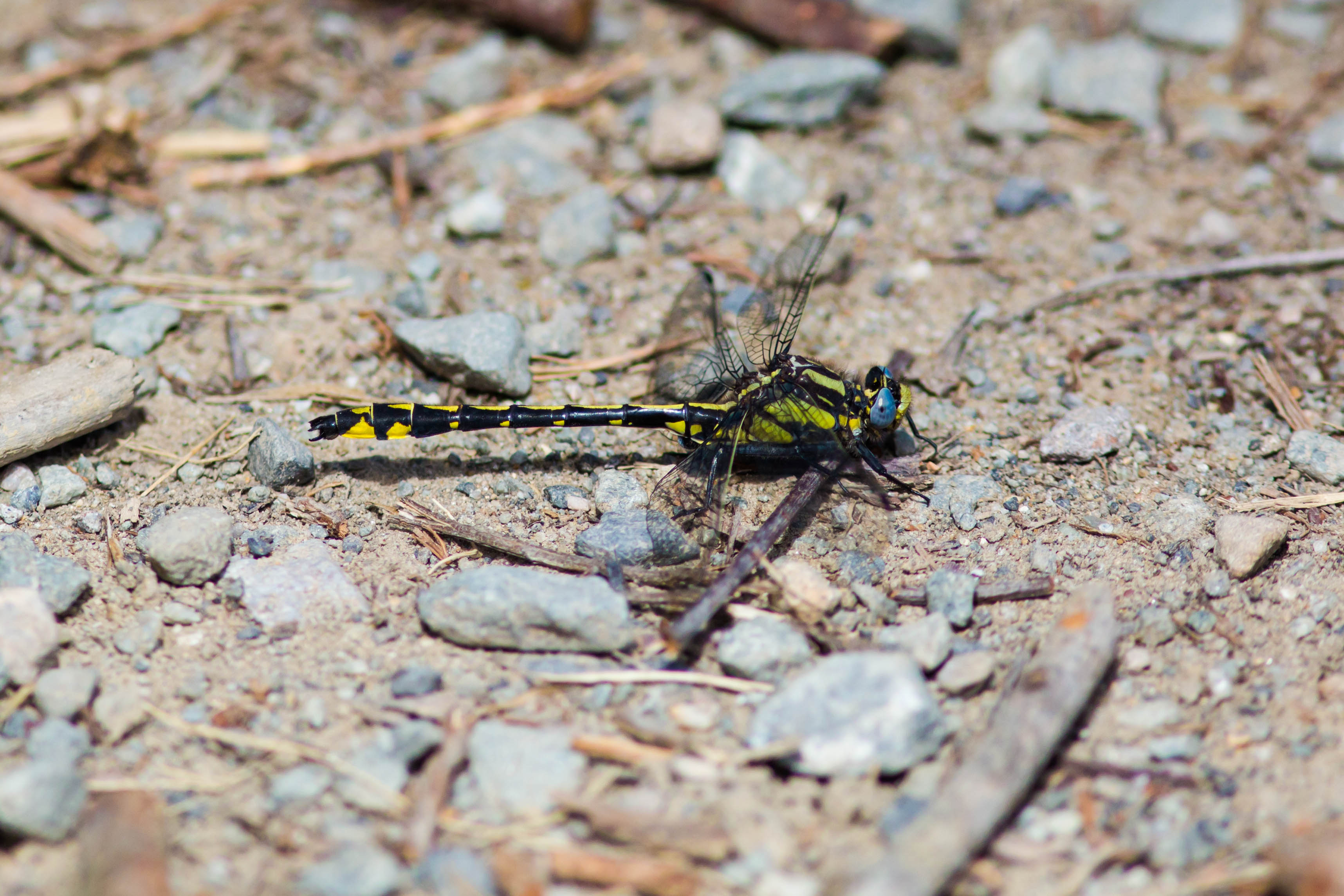
- Phanogomphus kurilis, Pacific clubtail, California

Conservation status
- Least Concern (IUCN 3.1)

Scientific classification
- Kingdom: Animalia
- Phylum: Arthropoda
- Clade: Pancrustacea
- Class: Insecta
- Order: Odonata
- Suborder: Anisoptera
- Family: Gomphidae
- Genus: Phanogomphus
- Species: P. kurilis

Binomial name
- Phanogomphus kurilis (Hagen in Selys, 1858)

= Phanogomphus kurilis =

Species of dragonfly

Phanogomphus kurilis, the Pacific clubtail, is a species of clubtail in the dragonfly family Gomphidae. It is found in the western United States.

The IUCN conservation status of Phanogomphus kurilis is "LC", least concern, with no immediate threat to the species' survival. The IUCN status was assessed in 2016.
