= Phanogomphus diminutus =

Conservation status
- Least Concern (IUCN 3.1)

Scientific classification
- Kingdom: Animalia
- Phylum: Arthropoda
- Class: Insecta
- Order: Odonata
- Infraorder: Anisoptera
- Family: Gomphidae
- Genus: Phanogomphus
- Species: P. diminutus

Binomial name
- Phanogomphus diminutus (Needham, 1950)

Species of dragonfly

Phanogomphus diminutus, the diminutive clubtail, is a species of clubtail dragonfly in the family Gomphidae. It is endemic to the southeastern United States. Its natural habitats are boggy trickles and slow, small streams and lakes, all with part sand, part silt bottoms, and Sphagnum moss margins.

The IUCN conservation status of Phanogomphus diminutus is "LC", least concern, with no immediate threat to the species' survival. The IUCN status was reviewed in 2018. The species had a Red List assessment of "rare" from 1986 to 1994, "lower risk/near threatened" in 1996, and "near threatened" in 2007. There are about 18 known populations of Phanogomphus diminutus, in Georgia, North Carolina, and South Carolina. Each has an apparently stable population of around 1000.
