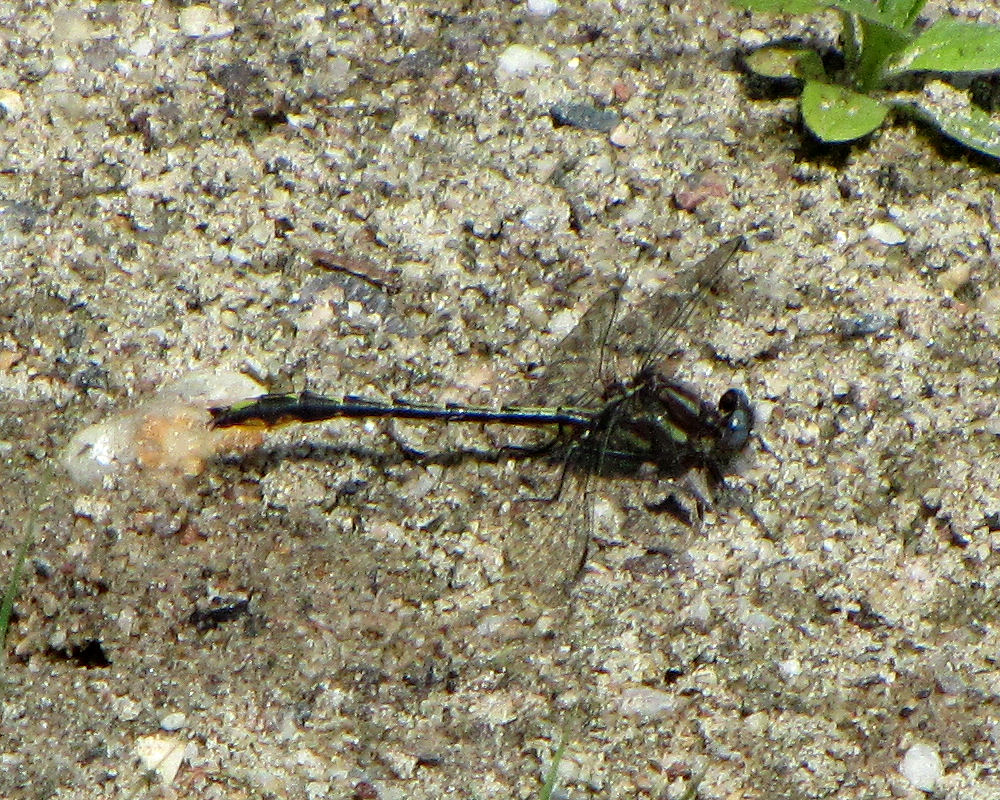
- female

Conservation status
- Least Concern (IUCN 3.1)

Scientific classification
- Kingdom: Animalia
- Phylum: Arthropoda
- Class: Insecta
- Order: Odonata
- Infraorder: Anisoptera
- Family: Gomphidae
- Genus: Phanogomphus
- Species: P. exilis

Binomial name
- Phanogomphus exilis (Selys, 1854)

= Phanogomphus exilis =

Species of dragonfly

Phanogomphus exilis, the lancet clubtail, is a species of dragonfly in the family Gomphidae widespread and common throughout southern Manitoba, Ontario, and the northeastern United States.

The adults are approximately 4.3 cm (1.7 in) long. The males claspers are 'lancet' shaped, hence the common name. The body is black with green stripes on the thorax and green triangles on the abdomen. The last two abdominal segments have yellow patches on the outer edges.

Their flight period is from June to July.

The IUCN conservation status of Phanogomphus exilis is "LC", least concern, with no immediate threat to the species' survival. The population is stable. The IUCN status was reviewed in 2018.
