= Dark hunter =

Dark hunter may refer to:

- Austrogomphus bifurcatus, a species of dragonfly, native to northern Australia
- Dark-Hunter, a paranormal romance novel series by Sherrilyn Kenyon
- Dark-Hunter Universe, a fictional world in which multiple interlocking series by Sherrilyn Kenyon come together, see The Dark-Hunter, Dream-Hunter, Were-Hunter and Hellchaser Universe
- Dark HunTor may refer to Operation Dark HunTor a U.S. law enforcement operation regarding The Onion Browser (TOR) a.k.a. the dark web.
