= Alethea Kontis =

American author (born 1976)

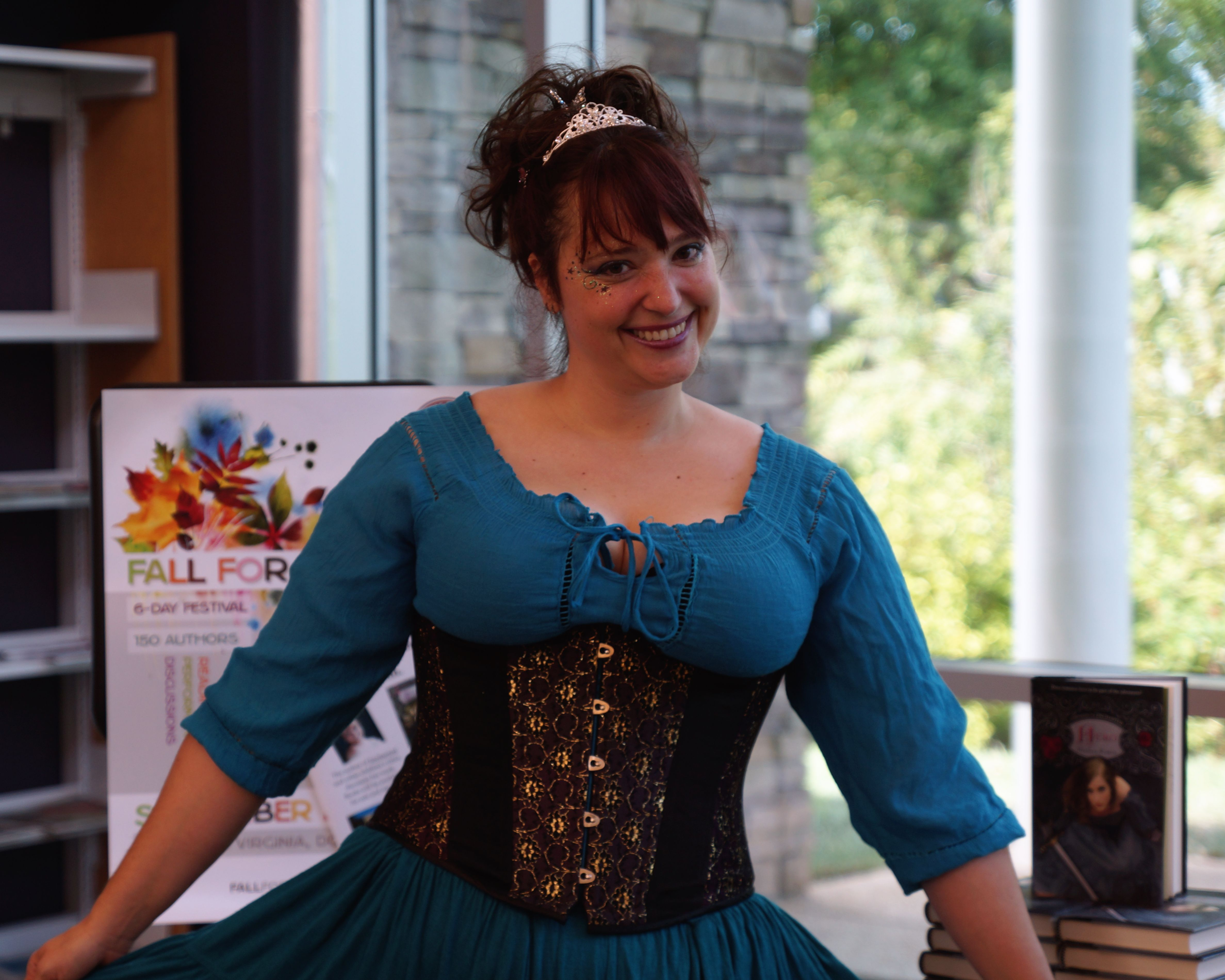
- Kontis at Burke Centre Library in 2013
- Born: January 11, 1976 (age 50); South Burlington, Vermont, U.S.
- Occupation: Writer
- Writing career
- Genres: Teen & young adult, fantasy, horror fiction, science fiction, romance
- Website: www.aletheakontis.com

Alethea Kontis (born January 11, 1976) is an American writer of Teen & Young Adult Books, picture books and speculative fiction, primarily for children, as well as an essayist and storyteller.

== Biography ==
Born in South Burlington, Vermont, Kontis lives in Titusville, Florida. She contributes to a variety of publications including Apex Science Fiction and Horror Digest. As a prolific writer she has also been awarded a number of prizes for her work including the Garden State Teen Book Award, the Scribe Award and the Gelett Burgess Children's Book Award which she won twice.

Kontis has been an NPR book reviewer for many years covering predominantly Young adult and children's fiction. Kontis co-wrote The Dark-Hunter Companion with Sherrilyn Kenyon. Kontis has learned and honed her writing under a variety of teachers including Orson Scott Card and Andre Norton.

== Early Career in Publishing ==
After graduating from USC, Kontis began a career as a bookseller and librarian, eventually moving to middle Tennessee to work as Assistant Children's Librarian at the Smyrna Public Library. From there she was scouted to become a book buyer for Ingram Book Company, where she spent the next decade. While at Ingram, Kontis interviewed authors as the "Genre Chick" for their Readers Advisory. She was one of four hosts of Ingram's "Tea in Space" podcast, and was given the title "The Voice of Ingram."

In 2000, Kontis moved further into the publishing world when she began copy editing for Booksurge press. This led to copy editing works for Solaris Books, Subterranean Press, Angry Robot, and Baen Books, among others.

Building on the skills she learned as a book buyer, Kontis started reviewing fiction for The Rutherford Reader and eventually earned her own book review column, "Princess Alethea's Magical Elixir," in Orson Scott Card's Intergalactic Medicine Show online magazine in 2008. Since 2018 her reviews have appeared in Locus (magazine) and, more regularly, on NPR Books.

In the mid-2000s Kontis added fiction editing to her growing list of skills. She became a contributing editor for Apex Science Fiction and Horror Digest in 2004, and later that year began working on Elemental: The Tsunami Relief Anthology: Stories of Science Fiction and Fantasy, a critically acclaimed benefit anthology she co-edited for Tor Books. The profits from this anthology went to Save the Children after the 2004 Indian Ocean earthquake and tsunami.

In 2005, Kontis launched a small speculative fiction press called NYX Books, which she ran until 2009. In 2015 she opened up another small press under her own name, Alethea Kontis, where she has self-published some of her own works.

== Writing career ==
Kontis' fiction writing career began after two events that inspired and transformed her: attending Orson Scott Card's week-long Literary Boot Camp in 2003, and connecting with author Andre Norton, who happened to live in the same small town. Kontis visited Norton's High Hallack, and the two became good friends in the last years of Norton's life. To continue honing her craft, Kontis helped found and participated heavily in the Codex Writers Group online workshop, starting in 2004.

That same year she received an offer from Candlewick Press to publish her first picture book, AlphaOops: The Day Z Went First (2006). Other books for young children followed, including a sequel to her first, AlphaOops!: H is for Halloween (2010), a board book titled The Wonderland Alphabet: Alice's Adventures Through the ABCs and What She Found There (2012), a picture book in verse, The Little Witch and Wizard (2019), and most recently Oodles of Doodles! (2022).

Kontis also established a foothold in the horror, science fiction, fantasy, and romance genres. Her first short story, "Sunday," was published in Realms of Fantasy in 2006. In addition to publishing dozens of genre short stories over the next decade and a half, she co-wrote the New York Times bestseller Sherrilyn Kenyon's Dark-Hunter Companion (2007), wrote a memoir, Beauty & Dynamite (2008), and published her first novel. The first book in the Woodcutter Sisters series, Enchanted, released in 2012. This expanded version of the fairy tale story "Sunday" won numerous awards and inspired the two follow up books, Hero (2013) and Dearest (2015).

After speaking about fairy tales at the Library of Congress in 2013, Kontis was asked to give the keynote address at the 2015 Lewis Carroll Society of North America's Alice150 Conference in New York City, celebrating the 150th anniversary of Alice's Adventures in Wonderland.

Kontis is also a poet, appearing in Everyday Weirdness, These Apparitions, Timeless Tales, Truancy, New Verse News, and more.

Kontis cites multiple authors and publishing industry greats as her teachers and mentors, notably Andre Norton, Orson Scott Card, Sherrilyn Kenyon, and Jane Yolen.

== Selected works ==
=== Novels ===
- Enchanted The Woodcutter Sisters Book 1 (Harcourt Books, 2012) 2012 Gelett Burgess Award Winner, 2015 Garden State Teen Book Award
- Hero The Woodcutter Sisters Book 2 (HM Harcourt, 2013)
- Dearest The Woodcutter Sisters Book 3 (HM Harcourt, 2015)
- Trixter The Trix Adventures Book 1 (Self Published, 2015)
- Trix & the Faerie Queen The Trix Adventures Book 2 (Self Published, 2016) 2016 Dragon Award Finalist
- Haven Kansas (Self Published, 2016)
- The Truth About Cats And Wolves: A Nocturne Falls Universe story (Sugar Skull Books, 2017)
- When Tinker Met Bell: A Nocturne Falls Universe story (Sugar Skull Books, 2017) 2018 Dragon Award Nominee
- Besphinxed: A Nocturne Falls Universe story (Sugar Skull Books, 2018) 2019 Scribe Award Winner
- Thieftess (Thursday Woodcutter) The Woodcutter Sisters Book 4 Release Date TBD

=== Collections ===
- Beauty & Dynamite (Apex Publications, June 2008) ISBN 0-9776681-7-7 – essays and poems
- Wild & Wishful, Dark & Dreaming: the worlds of Alethea Kontis (2013, Alliteration Ink)
- Tales of Arilland (Fairy Stories from the Dark Wood) Books of Arilland Book 5 (Self Published, 2015) 2015 Gelett Burgess Award Winner
- Genius Loci: Tales of the Spirit of Place (Ragnarok Publications, 2016) ISBN 978-1941987612
- Upside Down: Inverted Tropes in Storytelling (Apex Book Company, 2016)

=== Anthologies ===
The Once Upon Faerie Tale Anthology Collection

- Once Upon A Curse (with Yasmine Galenorn and 15 other authors, Fiddlehead Press, 2016)
- Once Upon A Kiss (with Devon Monk and 15 other authors, Fiddlehead Press, 2017)
- Once Upon A Quest (Fiddlehead Press, 2018)
- Once Upon A Star (Fiddlehead Press, 2019)
- Once Upon A Ghost (Fiddlehead Press, 2020)
- Once Upon A Wish (Fiddlehead Press, 2021)
- Once Upon A Bite (Fiddlehead Press, 2022)

=== Non-fiction ===
- The Dark-Hunter Companion, co-written with Sherrilyn Kenyon (St. Martin's Griffin, 2007) ISBN 0-31236-343-5 - guide to the Dark-Hunter series

=== Children's books ===
- AlphaOops!: The Day Z Went First, illustrated by Bob Kolar (Candlewick Press, 2006)
- Diary of a Mad Scientist Garden Gnome, illus. Janet K. Lee; (Thaumatrope, 2009)
- AlphaOops!: H is for Halloween, illustrated by Bob Kolar, (Candlewick Press, 2010)
- The Wonderland Alphabet: Alice's Adventures Through the ABCs and What She Found There, illus. Janet K. Lee (Archaia, 2012)
- Oodles of Doodles!: Ready-to-Read Level 1, illus. Christophe Jacques, (Simon Spotlight, 2022)

=== Short stories ===
- "Sunday" (Realms of Fantasy, October 2006)
- "Small Magics" (Orson Scott Card's InterGalactic Medicine Show, October 2006)
- "Blood & Water" (Orson Scott Card's InterGalactic Medicine Show, July 2008) (Twice Upon A Time: Fairytale, Folklore, & Myth. Reimagined & Remastered, February 13, 2015, reprint)
- "Clockwise" (Orson Scott Card's InterGalactic Medicine Show, Nov. 2011)
- "Black Hole Sun" (w/Kelli Dunlap)
- "Life's a Beach" (w/Ariell Branson)
- "Blue & Gray and Black & Green"
- "Ghost Dancer"
- "The Giant & The Unicorn"
- "Sweetheart Come"
- "The God of Last Moments"
- "Foiled"
- "Happy Thoughts" (Apex Digest issue #3)
- "Poor Man's Roses"
- "The Monster & Mrs. Blake" (for The Story Station)
- "Diary of a Ghost's Mistress" (Shroud magazine)
- "Hero Worship"
- "Pocket Full of Posey"
- "Red Lantern"
- "Savage Planet"
- "Unicorn Gold"
- "The Unicorn Hunter"
- "The Unicorn Tree"
- "The Way of the Restless"
- "The Witch of Black Mountain"
- "Messenger (Chapter 20 of Dearest) (2015)
- "For Angels to Fly: A Short Story" (2016)
- "Barefoot Bay: Fish Out of Water (Kindle Worlds Novella)" (2016)

== Awards and nominations ==
Year	Award	For
2010	NCTE Notable Children's Trade Books in the Language Arts	For "AlphaOops!".
2010	Junior Library Guild Selection	For "AlphaOops!".
2010	Publishers Weekly Starred Review	For "AlphaOops!".
2012	Kirkus Starred Review	For "Enchanted".
2012	Gelett Burgess Award Winner - Fiction (Middle Grade)	For "Enchanted". Archived from the original on 2023-07-12.
2012	Kirkus Best Teen Books of 2012	For "Enchanted".
2012	SWFA Andre Norton Award Nominee	For "Enchanted".
2013	SWFA Andre Norton Award Nominee	For "Hero".
2013	Audie Award Nominee	For "Enchanted".
2013	YALSA Top Ten Best Fiction For Young Adults	For "Enchanted".
2013	YALSA Amazing Audiobooks For Young Adults	For "Enchanted".
2014	World Book Night Pick	For "Enchanted".
2014	Prism Award Nominee	For "Hero". Fantasy, Futuristic and Paranormal Romance Writers. 8 January 2015. Archived from the original on 12 July 2023.
2015	Garden State Book Award - Fiction Winner	For "Enchanted".
2016	Gelett Burgess Award Winner - Fables, Folklore, and Fairytales Young Adult	For "Tales of Arilland".
2016	Dragon Awards - Middle Grade Nominee	For "Trix and the Faerie Queen".
2018	Dragon Awards - Young Adult Nominee	For "When Tinker Met Bell".
2019	Scribe Award - Young Adult Winner	For "Harmswood Academy #3: Besphinxed". 20 July 2019.

== See also ==
Great grand-niece of Ernestine Mercer.
