= Savitar =

Savitar may refer to:

- Savitr, or Savitar, a Vedic solar deity associated with the Aditya class of divinities
- Savitar (character), a supervillain in comic books published by DC Comics
- Savitar, a character from Sherrilyn Kenyon's Dark-Hunter series
- Savitar, the yearbook of the University of Missouri (in print, 1894–2005)
