= Chronicles of Nick =

Young adult novel series by Sherrilyn Kenyon

- Infinity (2010); Invincible (2011); Infamous (2012); Inferno (2013); Illusion (2014); Instinct (2015); Invision (2016); "Intensity" (2017)
- Author: Sherrilyn Kenyon
- Language: English
- Publisher: St. Martins Griffin
- Published: 2010
- No. of books: 8

The Chronicles of Nick is a series of young adult novels written by Sherrilyn Kenyon. They are a spin-off of the Dark-Hunter, Dream-Hunter, Were-Hunter and Hellchaser Universe. The series is about a teenage boy named Nick Gautier, the son of a powerful demon. The series tells Nick's past and teenage years as he goes through high school.

The first three books in the series, Infinity, Invincible, and Infamous, all appeared on The New York Times Best Seller list.

The first seven books were published under St. Martins Griffin, also known as St. Martins Publishing Group through Macmillan Press. However, Kenyon purchased the rights to Intensity after a dispute over the release date and self-published the book.

The series blends urban fantasy with mythologies of Greek, Norse, Celtic, and Roman descent as well as including a focus on supernatural and paranormal creatures such as shape shifters, demons, witches, vampires, and so forth.

== Books ==
It is recommended that the reader tackle the Dark Hunter Series at least through Styxx before reading any of the Chronicles of Nick. The in-series chronology makes more sense if digested that way and thus spoilers are avoided that might arise if the sequence is read in reverse. However, the series can be read as a standalone given that Chronicles of Nick and Dark-Hunter fall into different genres: Young Adult and Adult respectively.

1. Infinity
2. Invincible
3. Infamous
4. Inferno
5. Illusion
6. Instinct
7. Invision
8. Intensity

== Series Summary ==
"I am the power they can't tear down."

The series is set in New Orleans and follows the adventures of Nicholas Gautier who discovers that he is a powerful demon, or at least he'll become one. Specifically, he is the son of the Malachai and will inherit his father's name and blood. Nick's destiny is prophesied: he will either bring about the end of the world or save it. He teams up with allies including a mysterious love interest Nekoda, a cranky, cynical demonic guardian Caleb Malphas, and a grimoire that has a mind of its own to change his less than stellar destiny of bringing forth mass destruction on the world. However, for where there is choice, there is also hope. Along their journey they shall face many difficult choices, as well as deciding who, or what, will be an ally or an enemy. Nick continues to discover the truth of his bloodline, carried by his father, as well as the supernatural realm of New Orleans.

== Characters ==
- Nick Gautier
- Caleb Malphas – Nick's friend who he discovers is a daeva demon and a slave to Adarian sent to protect Nick and help him learn and understand his demonic traits and abilities.
- Nekoda Kennedy – the love interest.
- Ambrose – Future Nick
- Kyrian Hunter – A Dark-Hunter who takes Nick in after finding him injured on the streets at night. When he was mortal, he was the Prince of Thrace but outcast himself when he fell in love with a girl of non-royal descent. He later became a general of the Thracian army. His feature book is Night Pleasures, the first book of the Dark-Hunter series.
- Cherise Gautier – Nick's mother
- Adarian Malachai – Nick's father, the Malachai demon but to the human world he is in prison for murder.
- Acheron "Ash" Parthenopaeus – oldest Dark-Hunter and leader of the species; also an Atlantean Prince. Feature book is Acheron, the sixteenth book of the Dark-Hunter series.
- Michael "Bubba" Berdette
- Simi – A Charonte demon child who Nick befriends despite her strange nature
- Artemis – Yes, the Greek Goddess
- Mark Fingerman - Friend of bubba, sometimes dowses self in duck urine.
- Death
- Stone Blakemore - Werewolf
- Brynna Addams - Nicks friend throughout school
- Virgil - Bloodsucking attorney
