= The Dark-Hunter, Dream-Hunter, Were-Hunter and Hellchaser Universe =

Fantasy novel series

The Dark Hunter Universe is the world in which multiple interlocking series come together to create one massive epic tale. Each series is marked by the type of creatures the novels are about.

The Dark-Hunter, Lords Of Avalon, Were-Hunter, Dream-Hunter, Hellchaser, and Chronicles Of Nick series all happen within the same universe and their stories connect.

A single book can include elements from multiple parts of each sect of this vast world.

They are written by #1 New York Times Best Selling author Sherrilyn Kenyon. Some are written under her penname: Kinley MacGregor.

The Dark-Hunters are immortal warriors who sell their souls to the Greek goddess Artemis for an Act of Vengeance against the one who murdered them. Once they've had their revenge, they are dedicated to defending mankind against Daimons (a psychic race cursed by Apollo) and other preternatural enemies.

The Were-Hunters are shape-shifters consisting of the Katagaria and the Arcadians. The Katagaria have animal hearts and are animals who can turn into humans. Arcadians are humans who are capable to turning into animals. Both have the ability to time-travel.

The Dream-Hunters are Greek gods consisting of the Oneroi and the Skoti. The Oneroi were cursed by Zeus to have no emotions after they played a prank on him. The Skoti are the Oneroi who have succumbed to the emotions they siphon off dreamers and who have become addicted to them. The Oneroi police their activity for fear of Zeus punishing them again and purging their ranks, as he did before.

Hellchasers are charged with policing the demons who roam the earth and protecting humanity, and others from them.

== Reading Order ==
1. Dark-Hunters (Formerly Fantasy Lover) (Julian and Grace)
2. "Dragonswan" (Were-Hunter; Sebastian and Channon)(short story originally published in Out of This World; reprinted in In Other Worlds)
3. Night Pleasures (Dark-Hunter; Kyrian and Amanda)
4. Night Embrace (Dark-Hunter; Talon and Sunshine)
5. "Phantom Lover" (Dream-Hunter; V'Aidan and Erin) (short story originally published in Midnight Pleasures; reprinted in Dark Bites)
6. Dance with the Devil (Dark-Hunter; Zarek and Astrid)
7. "A Dark-Hunter Christmas" (Dark-Hunter; published online; printed in Dark Bites)
8. Kiss of the Night (Dark-Hunter; Wulf and Cassandra)
9. Sword of Darkness, (Lords Of Avalon, 2006)(ISBN 0-06-056544-6) (as Kinley MacGregor)
10. Knight of Darkness, (Lords Of Avalon, 2006) (ISBN 0-06-079662-6) (as Kinley MacGregor)
11. Night Play (Were-Hunter; Vane and Bride)
12. Seize the Night (Dark-Hunter; Valerius and Tabitha)
13. Sins of the Night (Dark-Hunter; Alexion and Dangereuse)
14. "Winter Born" (Were-Hunter; Dante and Pandora; originally printed in Stroke of Midnight; reprinted in "Dark Bites")
15. "Second Chances" (Dark-Hunter)(published online, excerpt found in its entirety in "Styxx")
16. Unleash the Night (Were-Hunter; Wren and Maggie)
17. Dark Side of the Moon (Dark-Hunter/Were-Hunter; Ravyn and Susan)
18. "A Hard Day's Night Searcher" (Dark-Hunter; Rafael and Celena; originally published in My Big Fat Supernatural Wedding; reprinted in Dark Bites)
19. "Until Death We Do Part" (Dark-Hunter; Velkan and Retta)(originally published in Love at First Bite; reprinted in Dark Bites)
20. "Fear the Darkness" (Dark-Hunter)(originally published online; printed in Dark Bites)
21. The Dream-Hunter (Dream-Hunter; Arikos and Megeara)
22. Devil May Cry (Dark-Hunter; Sin and Katra)
23. Upon The Midnight Clear (Dream-Hunter; Leta and Aidan)
24. Dream Chaser (Dream-Hunter; Xypher and Simone)
25. Acheron (Dark-Hunter; Acheron and Soteria)
26. "Where Angels Fear To Tread" (Hellchaser)(originally published in Blood Lite)
27. "Shadow of the Moon" (Were-Hunter; Fury and Angelia)(originally published in Dead After Dark; reprinted in Dark Bites)
28. One Silent Night (Dark-Hunter; Stryker and Zephyra)
29. Dream Warrior (Dream-Hunter; Jericho and Delphine)
30. Bad Moon Rising (Were-Hunter/Hellchaser; Fang and Aimee)
31. No Mercy (Dark-Hunter/Were-Hunter; Dev and Sam)
32. Retribution (Dark-Hunter; Jess and Abby)
33. The Guardian (Were-Hunter/Dream-Hunter; Seth and Lydia)
34. Time Untime (Dark-Hunter; Ren and Kateri)
35. "House of the Rising Son" (Dark-Hunter; Aricles and Bathymaas) (prequel to Styxx; printed in Dark Bites)
36. Styxx (Dark-Hunter; Styxx and Bethany)
37. Son of No One (Hellchaser; Cadegan and Jo)
38. Dragonbane (Were-Hunter; Maxis and Seraphina)
39. Dragonmark (Were-Hunter; Illarion and Edilyn)
40. Dragonsworn (Were-Hunter; Falcyn and Medea)
41. Stygian (Dark-Hunter; Urian and Phoebe/Sarraxyn)
42. Shadow Fallen (Dream-Hunter; Valteri and Ariel)

== Chronicles of Nick ==
The Dark-Hunter universe also includes a Young-Adult spin-off/prequel series, The Chronicles of Nick, featuring a character named Nicholas (Nick) Ambrosius Gautier who appears throughout the Dark-Hunter Series.

1. Infinity (May 2010)
2. Invincible (March 2011)
3. Infamous (March 2012)
4. Inferno (April 2013)
5. Illusion (April 2014)
6. Instinct (March 2015)
7. Invision (March 2016)
8. Intensity (September 2017)

== Shadows of Fire ==
Shadows of Fire is a four book continuation of The Chronicles of Nick series.

1. Sabotage (2023)
2. Last Christmas (novella) (2023)
3. Savage (2024)
4. Simi (2025)
5. Sanctify (TBD)
