= The League series =

Romance book series by Sherrilyn Kenyon

The League series is an ongoing romance book series by the American author Sherrilyn Kenyon. The books are published by St. Martin's Press. It consists of eleven books that take place in a future time in a place known as the Ichidian Universe. In this universe, The League is in charge. The brutal, expertly trained League Assassins are essentially the power of the government. But like all governments, even the League is corrupt. The tagline for the series is In Morte Veritas (In Death, There is Truth).

== Born of Night ==
=== Characters ===
Nykyrian Quiakides, also known as Nemesis, is a half Andarion, half human former League assassin. He was born and trained to be a cold-blooded killer. He left the League because he didn't want to be a pawn for the corrupt government. Creating the alternate persona of Nemesis, Nykyrian along with his comrades help to counter the League's twisted view of the law. He is considered invincible, as many have tried to kill him yet none have succeeded.

Kiara Zamir is a famous dancer. Since her father is the president of her planet, she has never wanted for anything except peace. She is a constant target for assassins trying to use her to get to her father.

=== Summary ===
Rogue League assassin Nykyrian Quikiades is charged with the protection of Kiara Zamir, whose father's political power makes her a target for the Ichidian Universe's most deadly assassins. Along this journey, Kiara shows Nykyrian that he is not the monster he thinks of himself as. She shows him love the way no other has. For Nykyrian, what started as a job turns into an obsessive need to keep Kiara safe. Along the way, he must face his most powerful adversaries as well as the entire League force hunting him and his charge down.

== Born of Fire ==
=== Characters ===
Sheridan Digger Wade, more commonly referenced as Syn throughout the series, began his life as a "tech-thief". His father was one of the universe's most formidable thieves. He followed in his father's footsteps and became C.I. Syn, the most feared and well known thief in history. He is Nykyrian Quikiades' only friend and he does not use that term lightly. Nykyrian found Syn when he was a young man and offered to help bury his past so Syn could start a new life. He married and had a family, only to have it all ripped away from him once his past came back to haunt him. Since then he became a doctor in order to help Nykyrian and his cause to fight the League. He is also a deadly assassin as well as an alcoholic. He could be considered a form of comic relief throughout the series.

Shahara Dagan is said to be the best bounty hunter in the universe. Her brother Caillen is a known smuggler and one of Syn's close friends. She is fearless and fiercely protective of her family.

=== Summary ===
Syn has been trained by Nykyrian to be one of the deadliest assassins. But his shady past comes back to haunt him and now he's being hunted by the law. Shahara Dagan is the best bounty hunter in the Ichidian Universe. She has been charged with finding Syn and bringing him to justice. Now, Syn must prove that the charges against him are false and convince Shahara to help him prove his innocence. Shahara must decide between her brother's friend and her job to bring him in.

The book details Syn's past, where his father Idirian Wade abused him and his sister to the point where Syn's sister cut her wrists and committed suicide when Syn was slow returning home. Afterwards Syn turned his father in only to be imprisoned under suspicion of his father's insanity being passed to him through genetics. He spent his life escaping from prisons, breaking various laws and trusting no one. But then Shahara breaks into his apartment and tries to capture him only to be taken captive herself. During her captivity she and Syn have brief moments of attraction until Syn releases her in return for her calling off her bounty on him and swearing to never bother him again—she is required to honor her work as a Seax. She calls the law enforcement and Syn is arrested and tortured until she discovers Syn has helped her brother and sisters, who have fallen on hard times like her and she rescues him. Angered at first, Syn works with Shahara for the mutual goal of escaping the corrupt tracers sent to silence Syn and gather a chip he had hid from them as a child.

Over the course of the book their affections grow to the point where they have sex and begin to trust each other more. Shahara is required to pretend to betray Syn-who is out of the loop on the plan to keep the chip safe from Merjack, who has been leading the blood hunt on Syn to find the chip, which possesses evidence of the Merjack family's corruption. Though released after a trial, where his mother is the judge—Syn had refused to turn evidence of his innocence in since he refused to meet his mother, who had become hysteric when he approached her as a child and tossed him to the streets Syn refused to speak or associate with Shahara, who becomes depressed to the point where she refuses to use her large reward for revealing Merjack's corruption. But several months later, Syn is talked out of his booze-filled gloom by Nykyrian and sends Shahara a dress she had wanted to buy during their adventure as a gift before appearing in her apartment himself where he proposes. The epilogue takes place two years later where Shahara reveals she is pregnant—she and Syn had believed that a sexual assault that led her to becoming a Seax and a Tracer as a teenager left her unable to bear children.

== Born of Ice ==
=== Characters ===
Devyn Kell is a former League ally. But like Nykyrian, once he learned of their corruption and ruthlessness, he defected and became a runner. His job now is to make sure that planets in the Ichidian Universe get the supplies and weapons they need to survive.

Alix Garran is a woman with a mysterious past and more secrets than anyone in the universe. She's incredibly loyal and brilliant with anything mechanical, which got her the job as a systems engineer for Devyn Wade. Later she is revealed to be a slave who was chosen by the nemesis of the Wade family, Merjack due to her similarity to Devyn's deceased lover who had betrayed him. With her sister and mother on the line she must choose between her family and the man she loves.

=== Summary ===
Devyn Kell, who left the League and works as a runner, employs Alix Garran as a systems engineer. The two characters address events from their pasts while seeking to maintain their autonomy.

The book begins with Devyn serving as a field doctor during a campaign against rebels. During the skirmish he discovers a child, Omari, who had been hideously injured and crippled by explosives that killed his family. When he tries to help, his commanding officer commands him to abandon Omari and help their own soldiers (who are lightly wounded). When Devyn refuses and is threatened at gun point he disarms his commander and kills or cripples every soldier in his unit. Then he supposedly goes to Nykyrian, who uses his influence to call off the bounty on Devyn's head.

Years later, Alix has been recruited by Merjack under the threat of her sister being sold as a sex slave to find evidence of crimes by Devyn. She is given the job when she approaches Devyn and his crew after their usual engineer has been arrested. She slowly gains the trust of the crew, but is nearly revealed when a gang-including a former member of her father's crew tries to rape her. Devyn saves her, and later they have sex when Alix tries to do what she thinks is payment for him saving her. Devyn is shocked at her lack of knowledge of sex and how she thinks that she is required to sleep with him, but begins to show Alix how to embrace her freedom.

Over the course of the novel Alix is revealed by Devyn's father, Syn, and is forced to confess to Devyn. Despite thoughts of killing her—along with demands from his mother Shahara to do so he spares her and agrees to help her bring Merjack down. They arrange for to meet her contact, who is revealed later to be Devyn's older half brother and Syn's first son: Lieutenant Paden Whelms, who was turned against Syn by his hateful mother after she discovered that Syn was really Sheridan Wade. Whelms then reveals that Merjack never intended to free Alix or her family, and signals soldiers to recapture her—assuring that she will never be able to buy her own freedom legally. Devyn saves her once again and they go on the run, removing her tracking chip before crashing on a planet.

While fleeing, Devyn and Alix are saved by a bitter Paden, who had intended to use Alix's forged evidence against Merjack to prove his corruption. Devyn manages to persuade Paden to take Alix to safety-thought not without threatening and striking him. While they escape, Devyn turns himself in and is transported to Merjack to be tortured and killed. However the group manages to meet up with Syn, Shahara, Caillen (Shahara's smuggler brother), League Assassins Darion and Jace, Darling Cruel and Nykyrian to rescue Devyn. They manage to have Merjack arrested in the middle of the torture session, but Merjack breaks free and tries to kill Syn. Paden, in a moment of repentance, takes the shot for his father and apologizes for how he allowed his mother to turn him against his father—even offering to give his organs to help a recovering Devyn.

In the end Devyn recovers, and Alix is reunited with her family after they are freed by several of Syn's friends. A year later Alix is revealed to be pregnant with Devyn's child.

== Born of Shadows ==
=== Characters ===
This book focuses on Caillen Dagan, younger brother of Shahara, who is arrested in the process of taking the fall for another of his siblings during a smuggling gone wrong. He is sentenced to death only to be saved at the last minute by a man who claims to be his true father: The Emperor of a massive star empire who brings Caillen back to his home planet despite the smuggler's skepticism. His love interest for this novel is a Princess/Royal Guard of an empire dominated by warrior women and ruled by an ice cold monarch, Desideria.

== League Book list ==
1. Born of Night
2. Born of Fire
3. Born of Ice
4. Fire & Ice
5. Born of Shadows
6. Born of Silence
7. Cloak & Silence
8. Born of Fury
9. Born of Defiance
10. Born of Betrayal
11. Born of Legend
12. Born of Vengeance
13. Born of Blood
14. Born of Trouble
15. Born of Darkness
