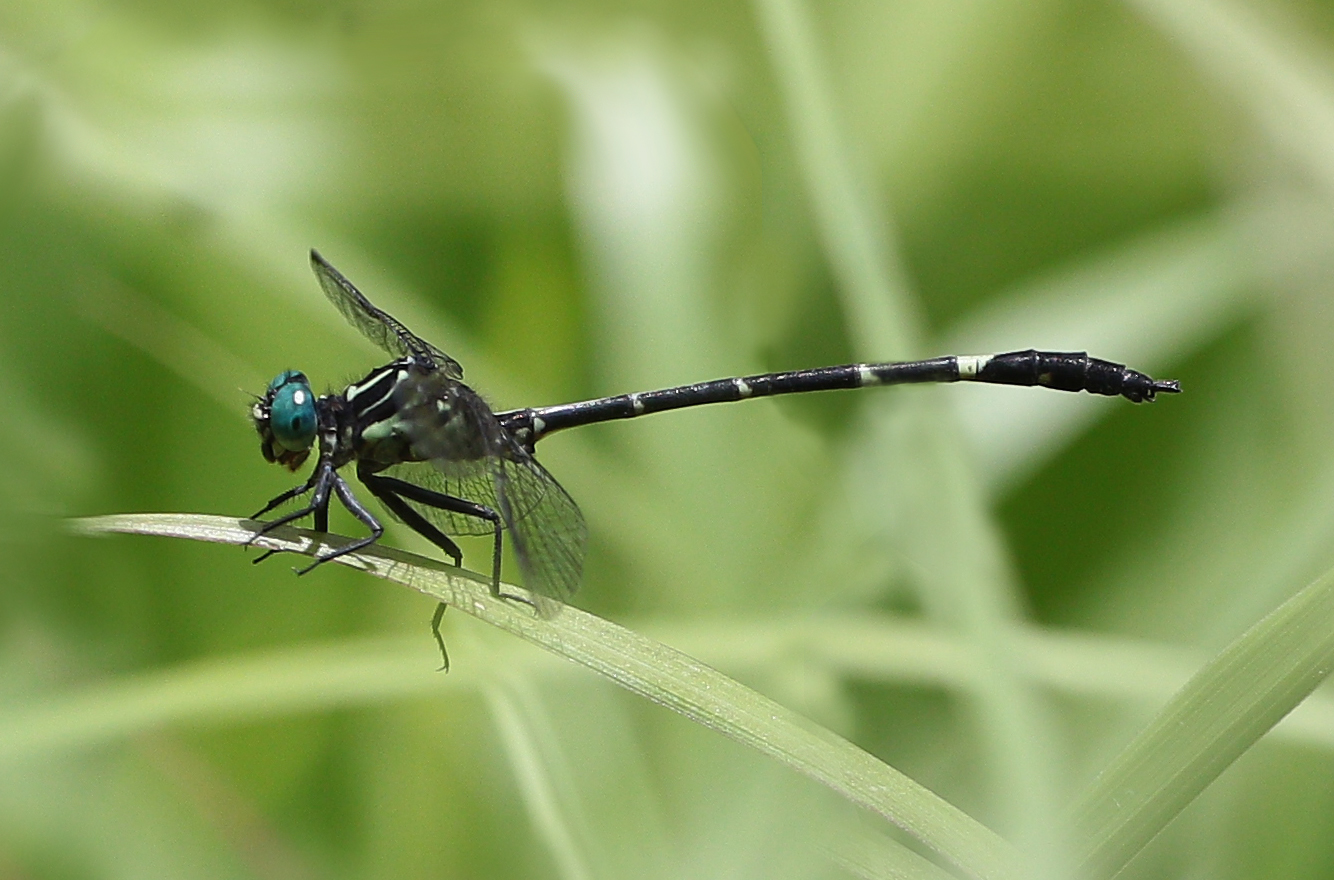
- male, near Cairns

Conservation status
- Least Concern (IUCN 3.1)

Scientific classification
- Kingdom: Animalia
- Phylum: Arthropoda
- Clade: Pancrustacea
- Class: Insecta
- Order: Odonata
- Suborder: Anisoptera
- Family: Gomphidae
- Genus: Austrogomphus
- Subgenus: Pleiogomphus
- Species: A. bifurcatus

Binomial name
- Austrogomphus bifurcatus Tillyard, 1909

= Austrogomphus bifurcatus =

Dark hunter

Species of dragonfly

Austrogomphus bifurcatus, also known as Austrogomphus (Pleiogomphus) bifurcatus, is a species of dragonfly of the family Gomphidae, commonly known as the dark hunter. It inhabits streams and rivers in northern Queensland, Australia.

Austrogomphus bifurcatus is a medium-sized, black and yellow dragonfly.

== Etymology ==
The genus name Austrogomphus combines the prefix austro- (from Latin auster, meaning “south wind”, hence “southern”) with Gomphus, a genus name derived from Greek γόμφος (gomphos, “peg” or “nail”), alluding to the clubbed shape of the abdomen in males.

The species name bifurcatus is derived from the Latin bis ("twice") and furcatus ("forked" or "branched"), referring to the distinctly forked appendages.

== Gallery ==
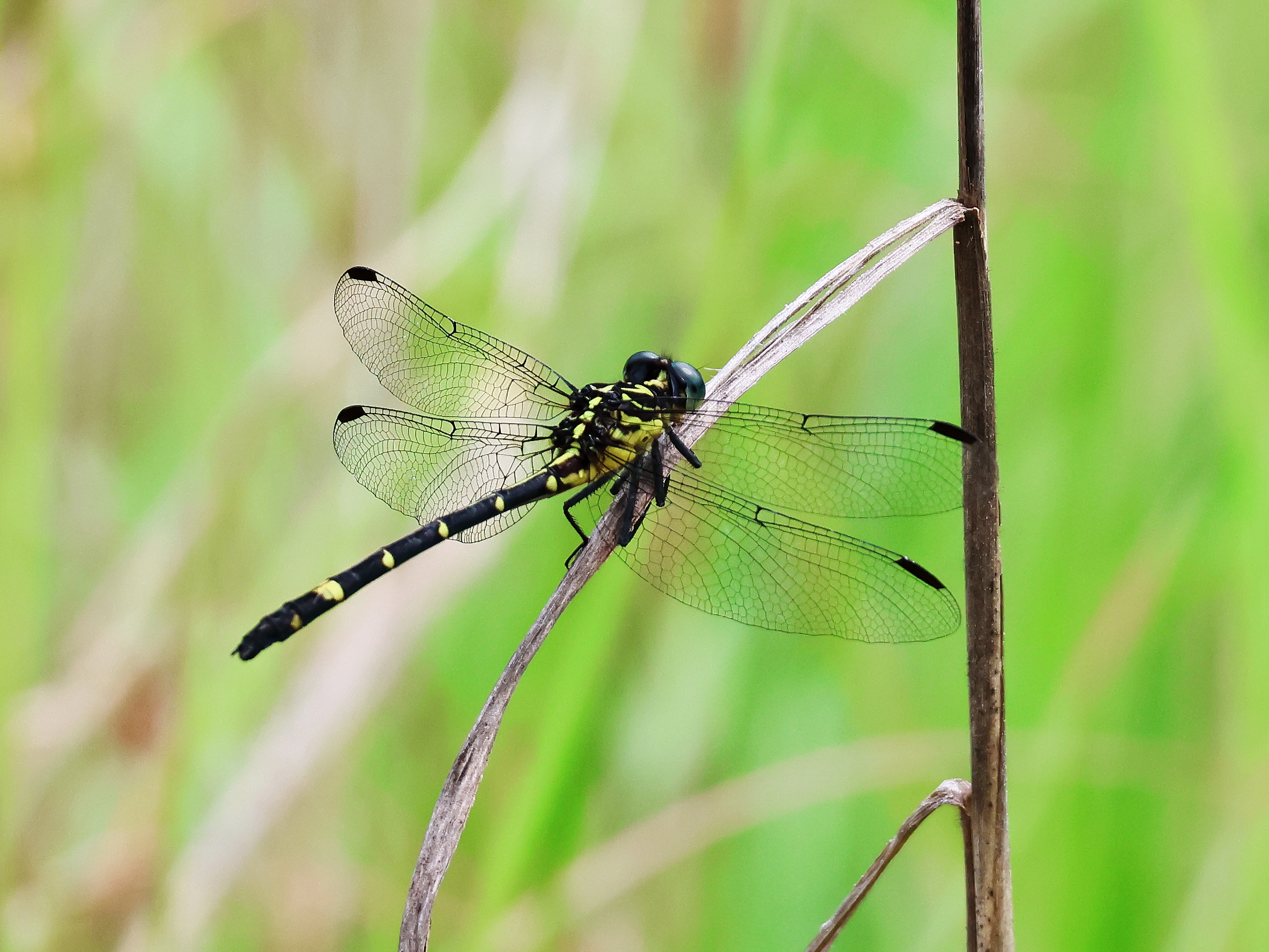
Female Dark hunter North Queensland

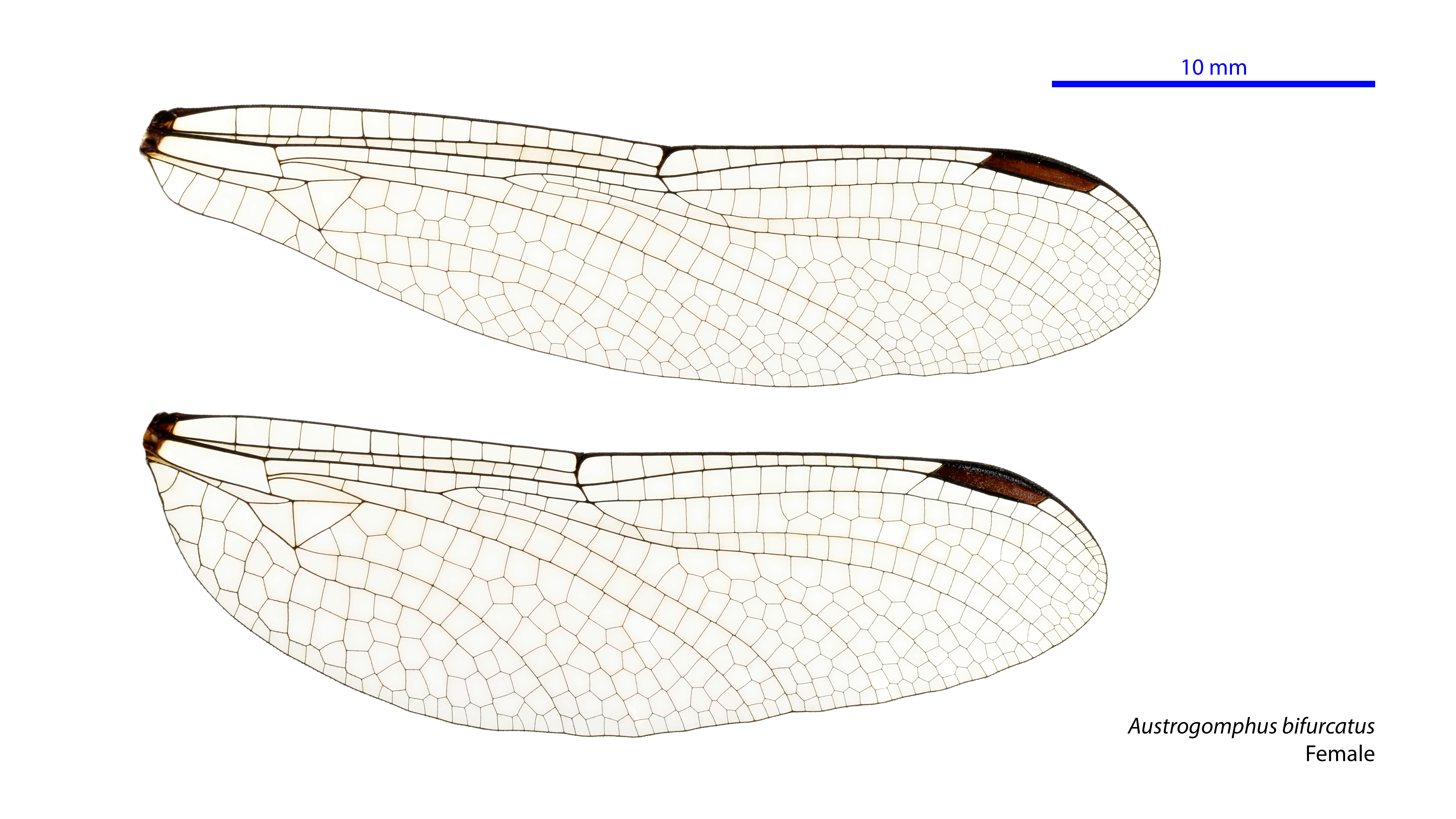
Female wings

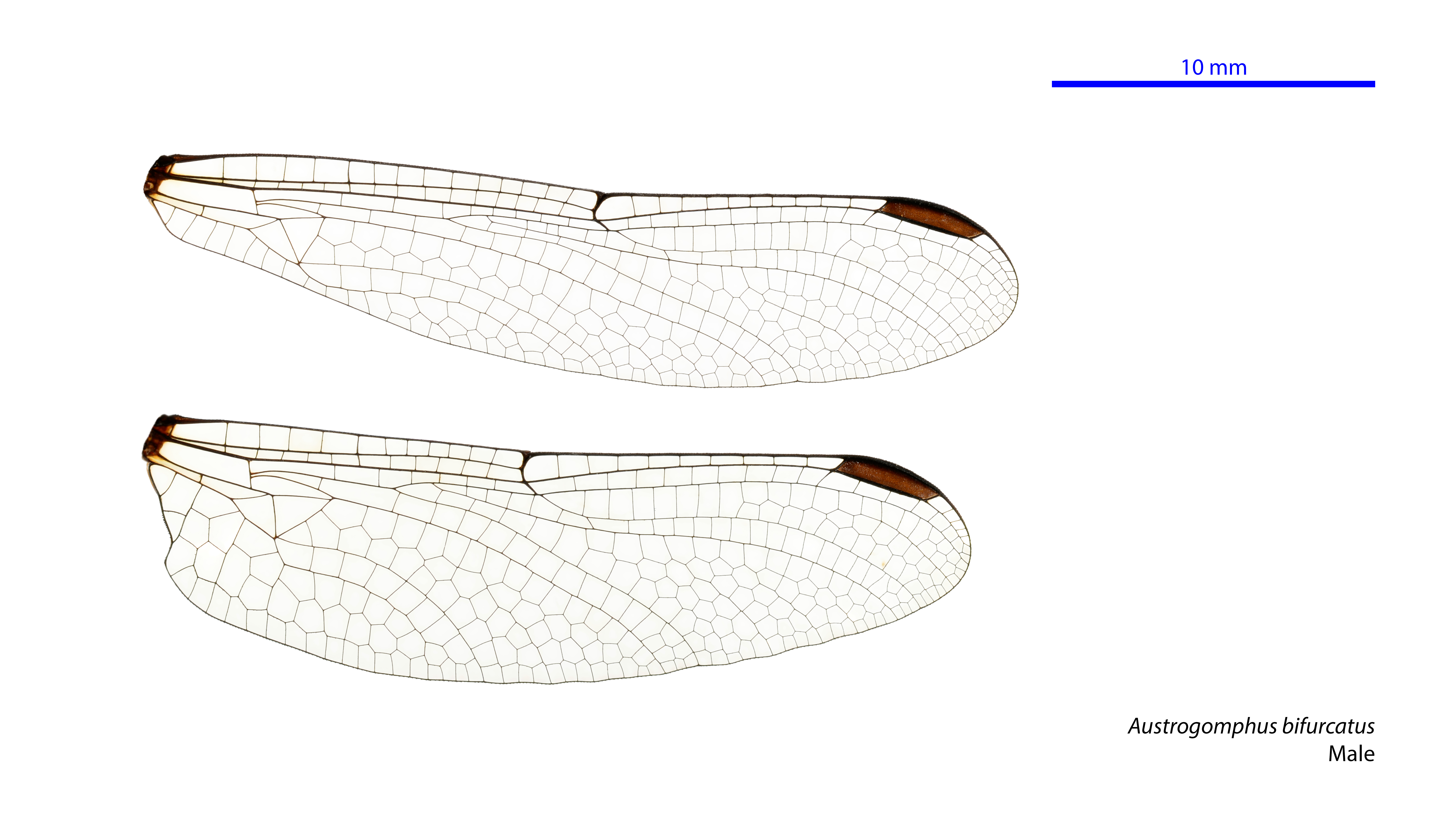
Male wings

== See also ==
- List of Odonata species of Australia
