= Sherrilyn Kenyon =

American novelist (born 1965)

- Kenyon at Dragon Con in 2026
- Born: Sherrilyn Woodward; December 11, 1965 (age 60); Columbus, Georgia, U.S.
- Occupation: Novelist
- Writing career
- Pen name: Kinley MacGregor, Sherrilyn Kenyon, Sherrilyn McQueen
- Period: 1985–present
- Genres: Paranormal romance, Urban fantasy, Science fiction, Fantasy, Paranormal, Suspense
- Website: www.sherrilynkenyon.com

Sherrilyn Kenyon (born December 11, 1965) is an American writer. Under her former married name, she wrote both urban fantasy and paranormal romance. She is best known for her Dark Hunter series. Under the pseudonym Kinley MacGregor she writes historical fiction with paranormal elements. Kenyon's novels have sold over 70 million copies in print in over 100 countries. Under both names, her books have appeared at the top of the New York Times, Publishers Weekly, and USA Today lists, and they are frequent bestsellers in Germany, Australia, and the United Kingdom.

== Biography ==
Sherrilyn Kenyon was born on 11 December 1965 in Columbus, Georgia. The fourth child in a family of five children, her parents, Harold and Malene Woodward, divorced when she was eight, at which point she lived with her grandparents. She describes her childhood as defined by abuse and poverty, but she remained close to her mother, who encouraged and shared her interest in horror, the paranormal and science fiction.

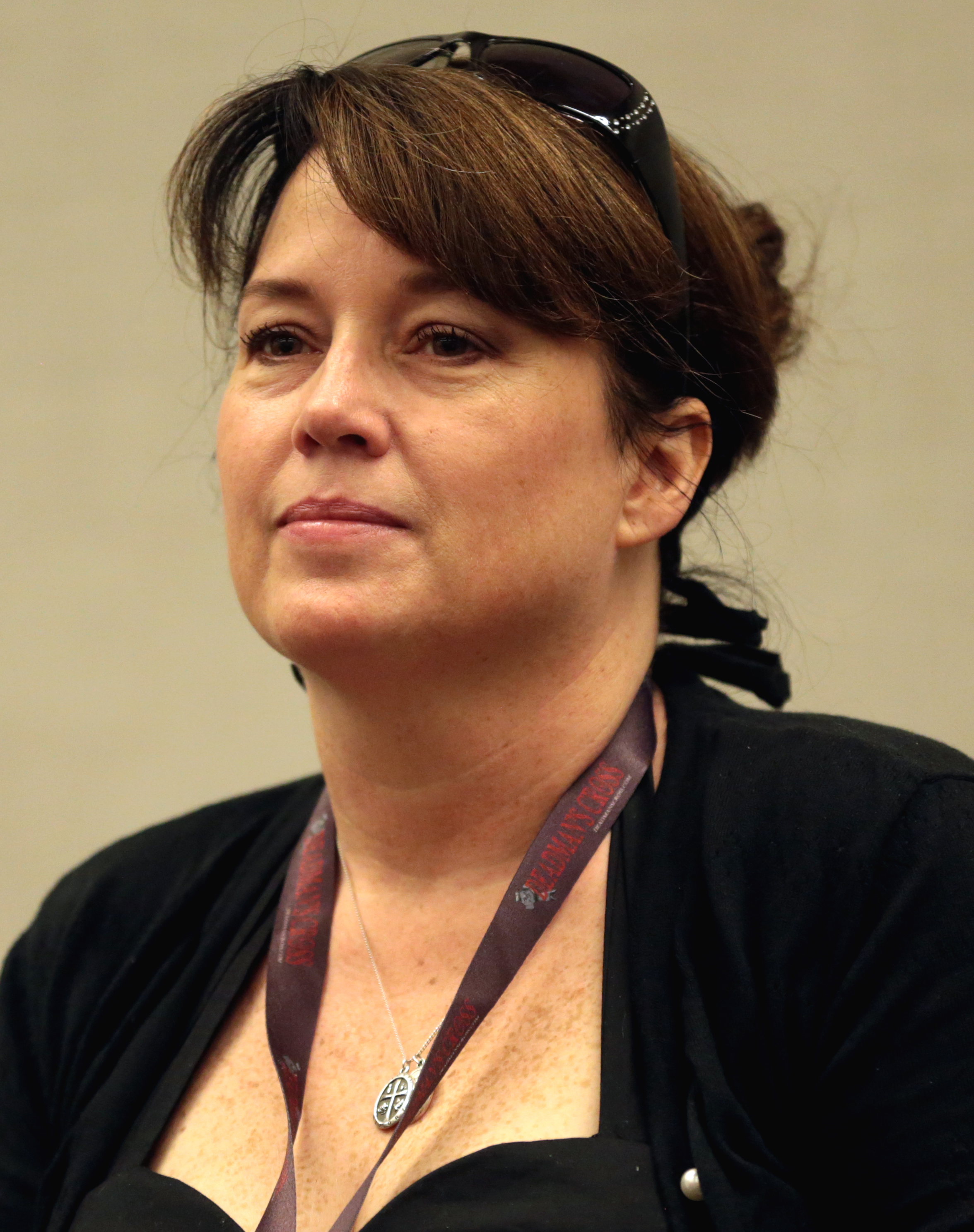
Kenyon in 2017

Kenyon started writing while in high school, in part as therapy to escape other aspects of her life. She went to Georgia College in the 1980s, and there she met her future husband, Lawrence Kenyon. They married in 1990, and they moved to Jackson, Mississippi, while he studied law. Although money was already tight, after their first child was born and he graduated they lost their house, subsequently forcing them to live out of their car until they were able to secure an apartment some months later.

Once in an apartment, Kenyon was able to return to writing. Previously, Kenyon had published her first story in 1975, and in the mid-1980s she was a writer for the science fiction magazine Cutting Edge. She had sold a number of books in the early 1990s, prior to the birth of her son, but her big break came in 1999 when the first two books of her "Dark-Hunter" sequence were picked up by St. Martin's Press as part of a three-book deal. She had started the series with short stories that she had written in 1984, and had started development on the novels in 1986, but it took until the late 1990s before she had the opportunity to complete them.

=== Accusations and divorce ===
On January 7, 2019, Kenyon filed a lawsuit against her husband and his assistants, claiming they had poisoned her over a number of years in order to sabotage her health for his financial gain. After her husband filed for divorce in March 2018, the suit alleges that tests concluded her levels of lithium, tin, barium, thorium and other metals were at a dangerous level of toxicity, indicating that they had "systematically poisoned her since 2015". However, the test results had not been interpreted by a toxicologist. Her husband's statement about the lawsuit called her "a brilliant fiction writer who has made it apparent that she cannot discern between fiction and reality". She dropped her lawsuit on July 26, 2019.

== Bibliography ==
Novels and short stories may be listed repeatedly because many of her series share the same fictional universe.

=== Written (mostly) as Sherrilyn Kenyon ===
==== Dark-Hunter Universe (combined) ====
Each sub-set of the series is marked by the type of creatures the novel is about.

Dark #	L.O.A. #	Were #	Dream #	Hellchaser #	C.O.N. #	Shadows of Fire #	Title	Characters	Publication Date
1	—	—	—				Dark-Hunters (formerly Fantasy Lover)	Julian and Grace	February 2, 2002
2	—	—	—				Night Pleasures	Kyrian and Amanda	September 1, 2002
3	—	—	—				Night Embrace	Talon and Sunshine	July 1, 2003
4	—	—	—				Dance with the Devil	Zarek and Astrid	December 1, 2003
5	—	—	—				Kiss of the Night	Wulf and Cassandra	March 23, 2004
5.5	1	—	—				Sword of Darkness	Kerrigan & Seren	March 28, 2005
5.75	2	—	—				Knight of Darkness	Varian and Merewyn	November 1, 2006
6	—	1	—				Night Play	Vane and Bride	August 3, 2004
7	—	—	—				Seize the Night	Valerius and Tabitha	December 28, 2004
8	—	—	—				Sins of the Night	Alexion and Danger	June 28, 2005
9	—	2	—				Unleash the Night	Wren and Maggie	December 27, 2005
10	—	3	—				Dark Side of the Moon	Ravyn and Susan	May 30, 2006
11	—	—	1				The Dream-Hunter	Arik and Geary	February 6, 2007
12	—	—	—				Devil May Cry	Sin and Kat	July 31, 2007
13	—	—	2				Upon the Midnight Clear	Aidan and Leta	October 30, 2007
14	—	—	3				Dream Chaser	Xypher and Simone	February 5, 2008
15	—	—	—				Acheron	Acheron and Soteria/Tory	August 4, 2008
16	—	—	—				One Silent Night	Stryker and Zephyra	November 25, 2008
17	—	—	4				Dream Warrior	Jericho and Delphine	February 3, 2009
18	—	4	—	1			Bad Moon Rising	Fang and Aimee	August 4, 2009
18.5	—	—	—		1		Infinity		
19	—	5	—				No Mercy	Dev and Samia	September 7, 2010
19.5	—	—	—		2		Invincible		
20	—	6	—				Retribution	Sundown and Abigail	August 2, 2011
21	—	7	5	2			The Guardian	Seth and Lydia	November 1, 2011
21.5	—	—	—		3		Infamous		
22	—	8	—				Time Untime	Ren and Kateri	August 7, 2012
22.5	—	—	—		4		Inferno		
23	—	—	—				Styxx	Styxx and Bethany	September 3, 2013
23.5	—	—	—		5		Illusion		
23.75	—	—	—				Dark Bites	Collection of short stories	January 21, 2014
24	3	9	—	3			Son of No One	Cadegan and Jo	September 2, 2014
24.5	—	—	—		6		Instinct		
25	4	10	—	4			Dragonbane	Maxis and Seraphina	August 4, 2015
25.5	—	—	—		7		Invision		
26	5	11	—				Dragonmark	Illarion and Edilyn	August 2, 2016
27	—	—	—	5			Deadmen Walking	Bane and Mara	May 9, 2017
28	6	12	—				Dragonsworn	Falcyn and Medea	August 1, 2017
28.5	—	—	—		8		Intensity		
29	--	--	--	6			Death Doesn't Bargain	Kalder and Cameron	
30	7	13	—				Stygian	Urian and Sarraxyn	September 3, 2018
31	—	—	—	7			At Death's Door	Valynda and	

===== Dark Hunter Universe short stories =====
- "Dragonswan"
- "The Beginning"
- "Phantom Lover"
- "A Dark-Hunter Christmas"
- "Winter Born"
- "Second Chances"
- "A Hard Day's Night-Searcher"
- "Until Death We Do Part"
- "The Wager"
- "Fear the Darkness"
- "Shadow of the Moon"
- "Redemption"
- "Where Angels Fear to Tread"
- Dark Bites (St. Martin's Press, January 21, 2014) – A collection of the short stories/novellas that Kenyon has written for St. Martin's Press, featuring Fear the Darkness, with Nick as the lead, and updates on other characters. Available in print in mass market paperback.
  - House of the Rising Son – Dark Hunter Universe #26.5. Dream-Hunter #5.5
    - The story of Aricles & Bathymaas (more about them in Styxx's book)
  - Phantom Lover – V'Aidan's story that was first in "Midnight Pleasures"
  - Winter Born – Dante & Pandora (Were-Panthers) that was first in "Stroke of Midnight"
  - A Dark-Hunter Christmas – Gallagher (Dark-Hunter) originally posted online
  - Until Death Do We Part – originally published in "Love At First Bite" anthology
  - A Hard Day's Night Searcher – originally published in "My Big Fat Supernatural Wedding" anthology
  - Shadow of the Moon – (Fury the wolf) originally published in Dead After Dark
  - Fear the Darkness – originally a digital download for fans. It is a little piece of Nick after his mother died.
  - Where Angels Fear to Tread – originally published in the "Blood Lite" anthology
  - Love Bytes – originally published in "Naughty or Nice"
  - Santa Wears Spurs – originally published in All I Want for Christmas anthology. Written as Kinley MacGregor.
  - Redemption – A bonus scene from The Guardian
  - A Hero for the Holidays (short story collection)
  - Season of Magic (short story collection)

==== Dark-Hunter Universe (by series) ====
===== Were-Hunter =====
1. Night Play, (St. Martin's Paperbacks, 2004) (ISBN 0-312-99242-4)
2. Unleash the Night, (St. Martin's Paperbacks, 2005) (ISBN 0-312-93433-5)
3. Dark Side of the Moon (St. Martin's Press, 2006, reprinted by St. Martin's Paperbacks, 2007)(Hardcover ISBN 0-312-35743-5, Paperback ISBN 0-312-93434-3)
4. Bad Moon Rising (St. Martin's Press, 2009, reprinted by St. Martin's Paperbacks, 2010) (Hardcover ISBN 0-312-36949-2, Paperback ISBN 0-312-93436-X)
5. No Mercy (St. Martin's Press, 2010, reprinted by St. Martin's Paperbacks, 2011) (Hardcover ISBN 0-312-54656-4, Paperback ISBN 0-312-53792-1)
6. Retribution (St. Martin's Press, 2011, reprinted by St. Martin's Paperbacks, Mar 27, 2012) (Hardcover ISBN 0-312-54659-9, Paperback ISBN 0-312-54660-2)
7. The Guardian (St. Martin's Paperbacks, 2011) (ISBN 0-312-55005-7)
8. Time Untime
9. Son of No One (St. Martin's Press, 2014) (ISBN 978-1-250-02991-1)
10. Dragonbane (St. Martin's Press, 2015) (ISBN 978-1-250-09240-3)
11. Dragonmark (St Martin's Press, August 2, 2016)
12. Dragonsworn (St. Martin's Press, August 4, 2017)
13. Stygian
14. Shadows Within (TBD)
15. Savitar (TBD)

===== Dream-Hunter =====
1. The Dream-Hunter (St. Martin's Paperbacks, 2007) (ISBN 0-312-93881-0)
2. Upon the Midnight Clear (St. Martin's Paperback, 2007) (ISBN 0-312-94705-4)
3. Dream Chaser (St. Martin's Paperback, 2008) (ISBN 0-312-93882-9)
4. Dream Warrior (St. Martin's Press, 2009) (ISBN 0-312-93883-7)
5. The Guardian (St. Martin's Paperbacks, 2011) (ISBN 0-312-55005-7)
6. Shadow Fallen (St. Martin's Press, 2022) (ISBN 978-1-250-77386-9)
7. Queen of All Shadows (TBD)

===== Hellchaser/Hell-Hunter novels =====
1. Daemon's Angel, (Leisure, 1995) (ISBN 0-505-52026-5)
2. Bad Moon Rising (St. Martin's Press, 2009, reprinted by St. Martin's Paperbacks, 2010) (Hardcover ISBN 0-312-36949-2, Paperback ISBN 0-312-93436-X)
3. The Guardian (St. Martin's Paperbacks, 2011) (ISBN 0-312-55005-7)
4. Time Untime (St. Martin's Press, 2012) (ISBN 0-312-54661-0)
5. Son of No One (St. Martin's Press, 2014) (ISBN 978-1-250-02991-1)
6. Dragonbane (St. Martin's Press, 2015)
7. Deadmen Walking (TOR, 2017)
8. Death Doesn't Bargain (TOR, 2018)
9. At Death's Door (TOR, 2019)

===== Lords Of Avalon =====
Notes: Begun as Kinley MacGregor. Continuing as Sherrilyn Kenyon.

1. Sword of Darkness, (2006)(ISBN 0-06-056544-6) (as Kinley MacGregor)
2. Knight of Darkness, (2006) (ISBN 0-06-079662-6) (as Kinley MacGregor)
3. Darkness Within (2012)
4. Son of No One (St. Martin's Press, 2014) (ISBN 978-1250029911) (as Sherrilyn Kenyon) (Sherrilyn explained at a Q & A that the LoA book Darkness Within morphed into Son of No One.)
5. Dragonbane (St. Martin's Press, 2015) (as Sherrilyn Kenyon)
6. Dragonmark (St. Martin's Press, 2016) (as Sherrilyn Kenyon)
7. Dragonsworn(St. Martin's Press, 2017) (as Sherrilyn Kenyon)
8. Stygian (St. Martin's Press, August 4, 2018) (as Sherrilyn Kenyon) (This book was previously titled Battleborn and retitled to Stygian)

===== Deadman's Cross =====
Part of three series: The Dark Hunter Universe, Hellchasers and Sea Wolves. They are historical fantasy.

1. Deadmen Walking (TOR, 2017)
2. Death Doesn't Bargain (TOR, May 15, 2018)
3. At Death's Door (TOR, Sep, 2019)

==== Dark Hunter Universe – The Chronicles Of Nick series (young adult) ====
The Chronicles Of Nick take place well before the first Dark Hunter novel (Fantasy Lover) and follows one of the series' main characters: Nick Gautier.

1. Infinity (St. Martin's Press, 2010) (ISBN 0-312-59907-2)
2. Invincible (St. Martin's Griffin, 2011) (ISBN 0-312-59906-4)
3. Infamous (St. Martin's Griffin, 2012) (ISBN 1-250-00282-6)
4. Inferno (St. Martin's Griffin, 2013)
5. Illusion (St. Martin's Griffin, 2014)
6. Instinct (St. Martin's Griffin, 2015)
7. Invision (St. Martin's Griffin, 2016)
8. Intensity (Nemesis Publications, 2017)

==== Dark Hunter Universe – Shadows of Fire series (young adult) ====
Shadows of Fire is a four book continuation of CON. After this is finished there will be an as of yet untitled adult trilogy that will finish the story line.

1. Sabotage (2023)
2. Last Christmas (novella) (2023)
3. Savage (2024)
4. Simi (2025)
5. Sanctify (2026)

==== Dark Hunter Universe – extras ====
===== Audio books =====
- All books in the Dark Hunter series are available on Audio. (Macmillan Audio, Unabridged edition, as of June 30, 2014)

===== Supplements =====
- The Dark-Hunter Companion, co-author Alethea Kontis (St. Martin's Griffin, 2007) (ISBN 0-312-36343-5)
- Dark-Hunter: An Insider's Guide, an enhanced ebook (Vook Inc., 2010) (ISBN 978-1-936321-32-2)

===== Manga and graphic novels =====
- Lords of Avalon Graphic Novels:
  1. Sword of Darkness co-written by Robin Furth (Marvel) (Hardcover ISBN 0-7851-2766-6, September 18, 2008) (Paperback ISBN 0-7851-2767-4 ISBN August 12, 2009)
  2. Knight of Darkness written by Robin Furth (Marvel) (Hardcover ISBN 0-7851-2768-2, September 9, 2009)
- The Dark Hunters Manga:
  1. The Dark Hunter: Vol. 1 (St. Martin's Griffin, July 7, 2009) (ISBN 0-312-37687-1)
  2. The Dark Hunter: Vol. 2 (St. Martin's Griffin, March 2, 2010) (ISBN 0-312-55400-1)
  3. The Dark Hunter: Vol. 3 (St. Martin's Griffin, September 28, 2010) (ISBN 0-312-37688-X)
  4. The Dark Hunter: Vol. 4 (St. Martin's Griffin, March 1, 2011) (ISBN 0-312-55401-X)

===== Comics =====
- Sword of Darkness (6 issues)
- Knight of Darkness (6 issues)

===== Omnibuses and boxed sets =====
- Night Pleasures and Night Embrace (St. Martin's Griffin, September 29, 2005) (ISBN 978-0-312-35563-0)
- The Dark-Hunter Novels Boxed Set (Night Pleasures, Night Embrace, and Dance with the Devil) (St. Martin's Paperbacks, October 3, 2006) (ISBN 978-0-312-94221-2)
- The Dark-Hunter Novels Boxed Set (Night Pleasures, Night Embrace, Dance with the Devil, Kiss of the Night, and Night Play) (St. Martin's Paperbacks, September 28, 2010) (ISBN 978-0-312-53783-8)

==== B.A.D. (Bureau of American Defense) Agency series ====
===== Novels =====
1. Bad Attitude, (Pocket Books, June 27, 2006) (Hardcover ISBN 1-4165-0356-0, Paperback ISBN 1-4165-2029-5)
2. Phantom in the Night, co-author Dianna Love (Pocket Star Books, June 10, 2008) (ISBN 1-4165-0357-9)
3. Whispered Lies, co-author Dianna Love (Pocket Books, May 12, 2009) (ISBN 1-4165-9742-5)
4. Silent Truth, co-author Dianna Love (Pocket Books, April 20, 2010) (ISBN 1-4165-9745-X)

===== Short stories =====
- BAD to the Bone, in the anthology Big Guns Out of Uniform (2005) (ISBN 1-4165-0967-4)
- Captivated By You, in the anthology Tie Me Up, Tie Me Down: Three Tales of Erotic Romance (2005) (ISBN 1-4165-0159-2)
- Turn Up the Heat, in the anthology Playing Easy to Get (Pocket, 2006) (ISBN 1-4165-1087-7)
- Just Bad Enough, short story, co-author Dianna Love, in anthology Deadly Promises (Pocket Star, 2010) (ISBN 978-1-4391-9111-8)
- BAD Mission, short story in the anthology Thriller 3: Love is Murder (Mira, May 29, 2012) (ISBN 0-7783-1344-1)

===== Omnibuses =====
- Born to Be B.A.D., a reprint of the BAD stories (BAD to the Bone and 'Captivated' by You) PLUS a new short story called One BAD Night (Pocket Books, August 30, 2005) (ISBN 1-4165-0750-7)
- A B.A.D. Collection includes eBooks of Phantom in the Night, Whispered Lies, Silent Truth, and an excerpt from Alterant (Pocket Books, July 26, 2011) (ISBN 1-4516-5204-6)

==== The League series ====
The League series is divided into two generations. Generation 1 is Nemesis Rising. Generation 2 is Nemesis Legacy. This series combines the two to tell a story. It is recommended that you read them in the order listed below.

===== Combined reading order =====
1. Born of Night: The League - Nemesis Rising (St. Martin's Press, Oct 2009) (ISBN 0-312-94230-3)
2. Born of Fire (St. Martin's Press, Nov 2009) (ISBN 0-312-94231-1)
3. Born of Ice (St. Martin's Press, Dec 2009) (ISBN 0-312-94232-X)
4. Fire and Ice (short story) in the anthology Man of My Dreams, published by Penguin Group US (2004, ISBN 1-101-09827-9); re-written & re-released in the anthology In Other World, published by Penguin Group (2010, ISBN 1-101-45766-X)
5. Born of Shadows (Grand Central Publishing, April 2011) (ISBN 0-446-57325-6 )
6. Born of Silence (Grand Central Publishing, May 2012) (ISBN 0-446-57331-0)
7. Cloak & Silence (E-book published independently; CreateSpace Independent Publishing Platform April 2013)
8. Born of Fury (St. Martin's Press, July 2014)
9. Born of Defiance (St. Martin's Press, May 2015)
10. Born of Betrayal (St. Martin's Press, November 2015)
11. Born of Legend (St. Martin's Press, May 2016)
12. Born of Vengeance (St. Martin's Press, May 2017)
13. Born of Trouble (St. Martin's Press, TBD)
14. Born of Darkness (St. Martin's Press, TBD)

===== Nemesis Rising =====
1. Born of Night (St. Martin's Press, Oct 2009) (ISBN 0-312-94230-3)
2. Born of Fire (St. Martin's Press, Nov 2009) (ISBN 0-312-94231-1)
3. Born of Shadows (Grand Central Publishing, April 2011) (ISBN 0-446-57325-6 )
4. Born of Silence (Grand Central Publishing, May 2012) (ISBN 0-446-57331-0)
5. Cloak & Silence (E-book published independently; CreateSpace Independent Publishing Platform April 2013)
6. Born of Fury (St. Martin's Press, July 2014)
7. Born of Defiance (St. Martin's Press, May 2015)
8. Born of Betrayal (St. Martin's Press, November 2015)
9. Born of Legend (St. Martin's Press, May 2016)
10. Born of Vengeance (St. Martin's Press, May 2017)
11. Born of Trouble (St. Martin's Press, TBD)
12. Born of Darkness (St. Martin's Press, TBD)

===== Nemesis Legacy =====
1. Born of Ice (St. Martin's Press, Dec 2009) (ISBN 0-312-94232-X)
2. Fire and Ice (short story) in the anthology Man of My Dreams, published by Penguin Group US (2004, ISBN 1-101-09827-9); re-written & re-released in the anthology In Other World, published by Penguin Group (2010, ISBN 1-101-45766-X)
3. Born of Rage (short story) (2020)
4. Born of Blood (novella) (2022)

===== Nemesis Dynasty =====
Young adult spin-off series.

1. Born of Rebellion (TBD)

===== Eve of Destruction =====
Spin-off series

1. Eve of Destruction (2022)
2. Eve of Ruin (2026)
3. Eve of Havoc (TBD)
4. Eve of The Fallen (TBD)

==== Belador ====
The first four novels in this series are co-authored with Dianna Love. Later novels will be written solely by Dianna.

===== Novels =====
1. Blood Trinity (Pocket Books, Oct, 2010) (ISBN 1-4391-5582-8)
2. Alterant (Pocket Books, Sept, 2011) (ISBN 1-4391-9524-2)
3. The Curse (Pocket Books, Sept, 2012)
4. Rise of the Gryphon (Pocket Books, July, 2013)

===== Short story =====
1. Fire Bound, free e-short story (Pocket After Dark, 2011)

==== Silent Swans series ====
1. The Cecilian Swan (Coming soon)
2. Swans of Feather (Coming soon)
3. War of the Swans (Coming soon)

==== Nevermore series ====
1. Insurrection (Mighty Barnacle, LLC, 2017)
2. Omega Rising (Coming soon)
3. Crimson Dawn (Coming soon)

==== Myths & Outlaws series ====
1. House of Fire & Magic (2024)
2. House of Ice and Shadows (2025)
3. House of Air and Illusions (2026)

==== Other works ====
===== Novels =====
- Daemon's Angel (Leisure Books, 1995)

===== Novellas =====
- Love Bytes, in the anthology Naughty or Nice (St. Martin's Press, 2000) (ISBN 0-312-98102-3)
- Knightly Dreams, in the anthology What Dreams May Come (Penguin Group, 2005) (ISBN 0-425-21085-5)

===== Essays =====
- "The Search of Spike's Balls", in Seven Seasons of Buffy edited by Ben Bella (ISBN 1-932100-08-3)
- "Parting Gifts", in Five Seasons of Angel edited by Glenn Yeffeth (ISBN 1-932100-33-4)

===== Non-fiction =====
- The Writer's Guide to Everyday Life in the Middle Ages, (Writer's Digest, 1995)
- The Writer's Complete Fantasy Reference: An Indispensable Compendium of Myth and Magic, (Writer's Digest, 2000)
- The Writer's Digest Character Naming Sourcebook, with Hal Blythe and Charlie Sweet (ISBN 0-89879-632-6)
- The Writer's Digest Character Naming Sourcebook, 2nd ed. (ISBN 1-58297-295-8)

=== Written (mostly) as Kinley MacGregor ===
Published by Avon (HarperCollins Publishers) unless noted otherwise. Some of these appear in multiples because they happen in the same universe.

==== Lords Of Avalon ====
1. Sword Of Darkness (Part of the Dark-Hunter Universe)
2. Knight Of Darkness (Part of the Dark-Hunter Universe)

==== The Sea Wolves series ====
1. Master of Seduction, (2000) (ISBN 978-0-06-108712-7)
2. A Pirate of Her Own, (2004) (ISBN 0-06-108711-4)
3. Deadmen Walking (2017) *As Sherrilyn Kenyon
4. Death Doesn't Bargain *As Sherrilyn Kenyon
5. At Death's Door *As Sherrilyn Kenyon

==== Brotherhood of the Sword series ====
Includes the entire MacAllister's Series.

1. Master of Desire, (2001) (ISBN 0-06-108713-0)
2. Claiming the Highlander, (2002) (ISBN 0-380-81789-6)
3. Born in Sin, (2003) (ISBN 0-380-81790-X)
4. Taming the Scotsman, (2003) (ISBN 0-380-81791-8)
5. A Dark Champion, (2004) (ISBN 0-06-056541-1)
6. Return of the Warrior, (2005) (ISBN 0-06-056543-8)
7. The Warrior, (2007) (ISBN 0-06-079667-7)
8. Midsummer's Knight, in the anthology Where's My Hero? (2003) (ISBN 0-06-050524-9)

==== The MacAllisters series ====
1. Master of Desire, (2001) (ISBN 0-06-108713-0)
2. Claiming the Highlander, (2002) (ISBN 0-380-81789-6)
3. Born in Sin, (2003) (ISBN 0-380-81790-X)
4. Taming the Scotsman, (2003) (ISBN 0-380-81791-8)
5. The Warrior, (2007)

==== Other novellas ====
- Santa Wears Spurs, in the anthology All I Want for Christmas (St. Martin's Press, 1999) (ISBN 0-312-97680-1)

== Awards ==
Sherrilyn McQueen has received nominations and awards both under her married name Sherrilyn Kenyon and as Kinley MacGregor.

- Prism Award
  - Best Fantasy – Fantasy Lover
  - Best Light Paranormal – Night Pleasures
- Prism Award (2004)
  - Best Dark Paranormal – Dance with the Devil
  - Best Light Paranormal – Night Embrace
- The Golden Quill for Best Paranormal, Dance with the Devil
- Darrell Awards (2006)
  - Best Novel – Sins of the Night

=== Bestseller lists ===
- Sins of the Night was #5 on Amazon.com's bestselling books of 2005. Fantasy Lover and Night Pleasures are #6 and #7 respectively for the best of the decade so far.
- Devil May Cry was #2 on 'New York Times Best Sellers Hardcover Fiction List (week ended August 11, 2007)
- No Mercy on the New York Times Best Sellers Hardcover Fiction List
