= Dark-Hunter =

Novel series by Sherrilyn Kenyon

Dark-Hunter is a term from a paranormal romance and fantasy series by Sherrilyn Kenyon. Kenyon began writing the series in 1986 in horror, fantasy and science fiction magazines.

== Definition ==
The Dark-Hunters are immortal warriors who sell their souls to the Greek goddess Artemis for an Act of Vengeance against the one who murdered them.[3] Once they've had their revenge, they are dedicated to defending mankind against Daimons (a psychic race cursed by Apollo)[4] and other preternatural enemies.

She knew of Acheron's love and compassion for humans and his unwillingness to allow others to suffer when he could stop it. Knowing this, she created her immortal warriors and manipulated him into leading, training, and being responsible for them. Not just anyone may become a Dark Hunter, nor is the process easy.

A person must die as the direct result of a terrible betrayal, such as their best friend or a family member killing them in a brutal way. At the moment of their death, their soul will cry out for vengeance loudly enough to be heard by Artemis on Mount Olympus. Upon arriving, she offers the person a choice: true death or trading their soul to her to be resurrected as a Dark Hunter. In exchange for their soul and service in her Dark Hunter army, Artemis gives them 24 hours to seek their revenge against those who betrayed them. After those 24 hours are up, they must do their duty to mankind and hunt down the Daimons that prey on the humans.

When a Dark Hunter slays a Daimon, they release any human souls that the Daimon has stolen, provided that the Dark Hunter finds the Daimon fast enough. If the Daimon is not slain soon after taking the human's soul, the soul will die from being in the wrong vessel and be unable to pass onto whichever afterlife they were meant to go to upon their death.

The Dark Hunters work individually, each of them having a territory to watch over. They cannot be near each other for more than a short amount of time without draining each other's powers. Also, any physical harm caused by one Dark Hunter to another will cause the first Dark Hunter to suffer the same physical pain or hurt tenfold.

The Dark Hunters are night dwelling immortals who cannot be in sunlight (as Apollo cursed the Daimons with not being able to go out in the sunlight so too did Artemis leave the Dark Hunters with the inability to stand sunlight). They were made to be similar to the Daimons that they hunt so that they would be better able to hunt, battle, and kill them. They have fangs, super sensitive senses, and various psychic powers.

== Novels ==
Dark #	L.O.A. #	Were #	Dream #	Hellchaser #	C.O.N. #	Shadows Of Fire #	Title	Characters	Publication Date
1	--	--	--				Dark-Hunters (formerly Fantasy Lover)	Julian and Grace	February 2, 2002
2	--	--	--				Night Pleasures	Kyrian and Amanda	September 1, 2002
3	--	--	--				Night Embrace	Talon and Sunshine	July 1, 2003
4	--	--	--				Dance with the Devil	Zarek and Astrid	December 1, 2003
5	--	--	--				Kiss of the Night	Wulf and Cassandra	March 23, 2004
5.5	1	--	--				Sword Of Darkness	Kerrigan & Seren	March 28, 2005
5.75	2	--	--				Knight Of Darkness	Varian and Merewyn	November 1, 2006
6	--	1	--				Night Play	Vane and Bride	August 3, 2004
7	--	--	--				Seize the Night	Valerius and Tabitha	December 28, 2004
8	--	--	--				Sins of the Night	Alexion and Danger	June 28, 2005
9	--	2	--				Unleash the Night	Wren and Maggie	December 27, 2005
10	--	3	--				Dark Side of the Moon	Ravyn and Susan	May 30, 2006
11	--	--	1				The Dream-Hunter	Arik and Geary	February 6, 2007
12	--	--	--				Devil May Cry	Sin and Kat	July 31, 2007
13	--	--	2				Upon The Midnight Clear	Aidan and Leta	October 30, 2007
14	--	--	3				Dream Chaser	Xypher and Simone	February 5, 2008
15	--	--	--				Acheron	Acheron and Soteria/Tory	August 4, 2008
16	--	--	--				One Silent Night	Stryker and Zephyra	November 25, 2008
17	--	--	4				Dream Warrior	Jericho and Delphine	February 3, 2009
18	--	4	--	1			Bad Moon Rising	Fang and Aimee	August 4, 2009
18.5	--	--	--		1		Infinity		
19	--	5	--				No Mercy	Dev and Samia	September 7, 2010
19.5	--	--	--		2		Invincible		
20	--	6	--				Retribution	Sundown and Abigail	August 2, 2011
21	--	7	5	2			The Guardian	Seth and Lydia	November 1, 2011
21.5	--	--	--		3		Infamous		
22	--	8	--				Time Untime	Ren and Kateri	August 7, 2012
22.5	--	--	--		4		Inferno		
23	--	--	--				Styxx	Styxx and Bethany	September 3, 2013
23.5	--	--	--		5		Illusion		
23.75	--	--	--				Dark Bites	Collection of short stories	January 21, 2014
24	3	9	--	3			Son of No One	Cadegan and Jo	September 2, 2014
24.5	--	--	--		6		Instinct		
25	4	10	--	4			Dragonbane	Maxis and Seraphina	August 4, 2015
25.5	--	--	--		7		Invision		
26	5	11	--				Dragonmark	Illarion and Edilyn	August 2, 2016
27	--	--	--	5			Deadmen Walking	Bane and Mara	
28	6	12	--				Dragonsworn	Falcyn and Medea	August 1, 2017
28.5	--	--	--		8		Intensity		
29	--	--	--	6			Death Doesn't Bargain	Kalder and Cameron	
30	7	13	--				Stygian	Urian and Sarraxyn	September 3, 2018
31	--	--	--	7			At Death's Door	Valynda and	

== Short stories and novelettes ==
1. "The Beginning" (2002)
2. "Dragonswan" (July 1, 2002)
3. "Phantom Lover", in the anthology Midnight Pleasures (November 2003)
4. "A Dark-Hunter Christmas", also in the back of Dance with the Devil (December 2003)
5. "Winter Born", in the anthology Stroke of Midnight (October 2004)
6. "Second Chances", free giveaway (2005)
7. "A Hard Day's Night-Searcher", in the anthology My Big Fat Supernatural Wedding (October 3, 2006)
8. "Until Death We Do Part", in the anthology Love At First Bite (October 3, 2006)
9. "Fear the Darkness", free e-book (January 2007)
10. "Shadow of the Moon," in the anthology "Dead after Dark" (December 1, 2008)

== See also ==
- The Dark-Hunter, Dream-Hunter, Were-Hunter and Hellchaser Universe
- Sherrilyn Kenyon § Manga and graphic novels for the Japanese comic adaptation
