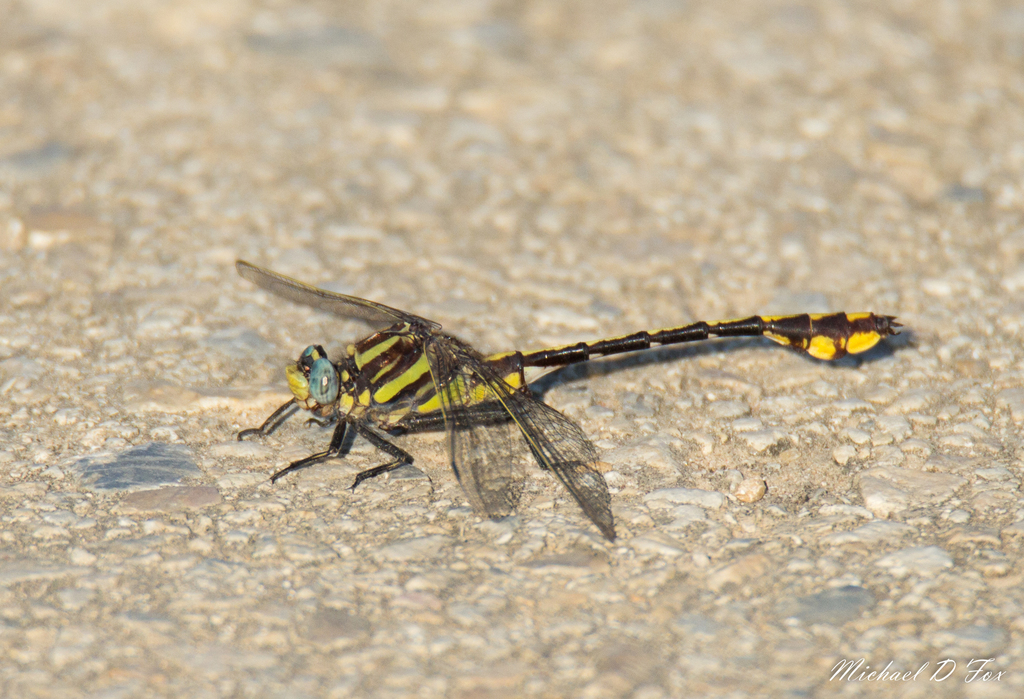

Conservation status
- Least Concern (IUCN 3.1)

Scientific classification
- Kingdom: Animalia
- Phylum: Arthropoda
- Clade: Pancrustacea
- Class: Insecta
- Order: Odonata
- Infraorder: Anisoptera
- Family: Gomphidae
- Genus: Gomphurus
- Species: G. externus

Binomial name
- Gomphurus externus (Hagen in Selys, 1858)

Synonyms
- Gomphus externus

= Gomphurus externus =

Plains clubtail

Species of dragonfly

Gomphurus externus, the plains clubtail, is a species of dragonfly in the family Gomphidae.

== Characteristics ==
=== Adult ===
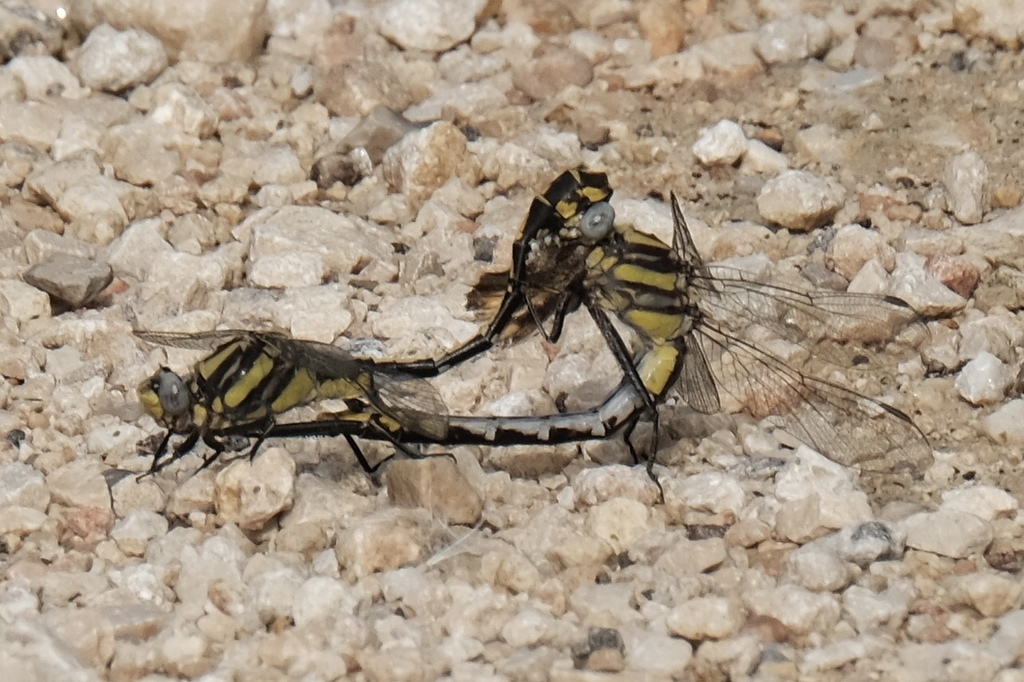
Pair copulating

The plains clubtail is a medium to large dragonfly with a length of 2 1/16 to 2 3/8 inches (52 to 60 mm). The base of this dragonfly is brownish black. Its face is marked with yellow. The top of its thorax behind its head is marked with a parallel pair of yellow stripes, and every side of the thorax is marked with several diagonal yellow stripes. The base of its wings may be clouded with yellow where they attach to its body. Its abdomen is black and is marked with a line of yellow dashes along the top. As with other clubtails, the segments at the tip of its abdomen are wider than the rest.

=== Nymph ===
The nymph of the plains clubtail is a large in size with a maximum length of 1 5/16 inches (33 mm). Its abdomen is thick for most of its length, then tapers to a rounded point at the end of segment ten. On each side of abdominal segments six through nine, there is a single, rear-facing spine. This species has no dorsal hooks.

== Geographical range ==
- United States: (Arkansas • Colorado • Iowa • Idaho • Illinois • Indiana • Kansas • Kentucky • Maine • Michigan • Minnesota • Missouri • Montana • Nebraska • North Dakota • New Mexico • Ohio • South Dakota • Texas • U.S. Virgin Islands • Utah • Wisconsin • Wyoming)
- Canada: (Manitoba)

== Habitat ==
Plains clubtails prefer moderately flowing rivers and large streams with muddy bottoms, and occasionally lakes.

== Flight season ==
The plains clubtail has many flight seasons, mid-July to mid-August is the most common. Another flight season it has is early April to mid-August. This species is most common in spring. In Wisconsin, they have been documented to have a flight season from early June to mid-July.

== Diet ==
=== Adult ===
Plains clubtails will feed on almost any soft-bodied flying insect such as mosquitoes, flies, butterflies, moths, mayflies, and flying ants, termites or even other dragonflies.

=== Nymph ===
Nymphs of plains clubtails feed on a wide variety of aquatic insects, including mosquito larvae, other aquatic fly larvae, mayfly larvae, and freshwater shrimp. They will sometimes eat small fish and tadpoles.

== Ecology ==
Plains clubtail nymphs can be very selective in their habitat choice and will often occur only in certain stretches of a particular river or stream. They will burrow into the sand or mud, leaving the upturned tip of their abdomen exposed. This helps them to breathe while buried by pumping water in and out of the tip of the abdomen. Unlike most species this dragonfly nymphs emerge as adults during the day. Adults generally fly from mid-July to mid-August. They also have other flight periods. These dragonflies can not tolerate cooler temperatures and are rarely seen flying on cool or cloudy days. Hunting occurs from rocks or bare sand from which they rest on. They perch with their abdomen elevated and their wings drooping so the tips just touch the ground.

== Reproduction ==
After when both genders mate, the female flies singly, without the male attached, to lay her eggs by dipping the tip of her abdomen into rivers, lakes, or slow streams while hovering above it. Lab experiments for this species have found that females are capable of laying over 5000 eggs.

== Similar species ==
The plains clubtail is most similar to Tamaulipan and pronghorn clubtails. The Tamaulipan clubtail is larger and darker with wider brown thoracic stripes and females lack the erect yellow spines at every end of the postocellar ridge. The pronghorn clubtail is smaller, it may not always be reliably separated from the plains clubtail. The male pronghorn clubtail has an epiproct that is barely wider than its cerci. The sulphur-tipped clubtail is smaller with yellow on the femora and more yellow on the club.

== Conservation ==
The populations of plains clubtails are widespread, abundant, and secure.
