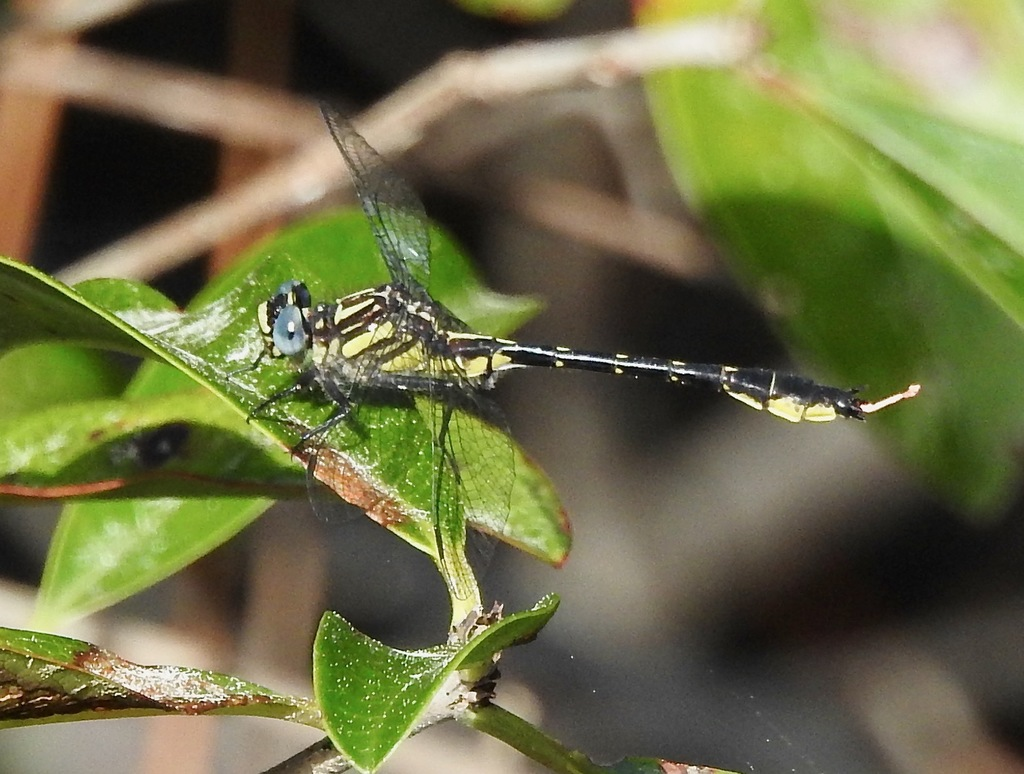
- Hylogomphus geminatus

Scientific classification
- Domain: Eukaryota
- Kingdom: Animalia
- Phylum: Arthropoda
- Class: Insecta
- Order: Odonata
- Infraorder: Anisoptera
- Family: Gomphidae
- Genus: Hylogomphus; Needham, Westfall & May, 2000

= Hylogomphus =

Genus of dragonflies

Hylogomphus is a genus of clubtails in the family of dragonflies known as Gomphidae. There are about six described species in Hylogomphus.

Hylogomphus was formerly considered a subgenus of Gomphus, but has recently been promoted to genus rank along with Phanogomphus, Stenogomphurus and Gomphurus.

== Species ==
These six species belong to the genus Hylogomphus:

- Hylogomphus abbreviatus (Hagen in Selys, 1878) (spine-crowned clubtail)
- Hylogomphus adelphus (Selys, 1858) (mustached clubtail)
- Hylogomphus apomyius (Donnelly, 1966) (banner clubtail)
- Hylogomphus geminatus (Carle, 1979) (twin-striped clubtail)
- Hylogomphus parvidens (Currie, 1917) (Piedmont clubtail)
- Hylogomphus viridifrons (Hine, 1901) (green-faced clubtail)
