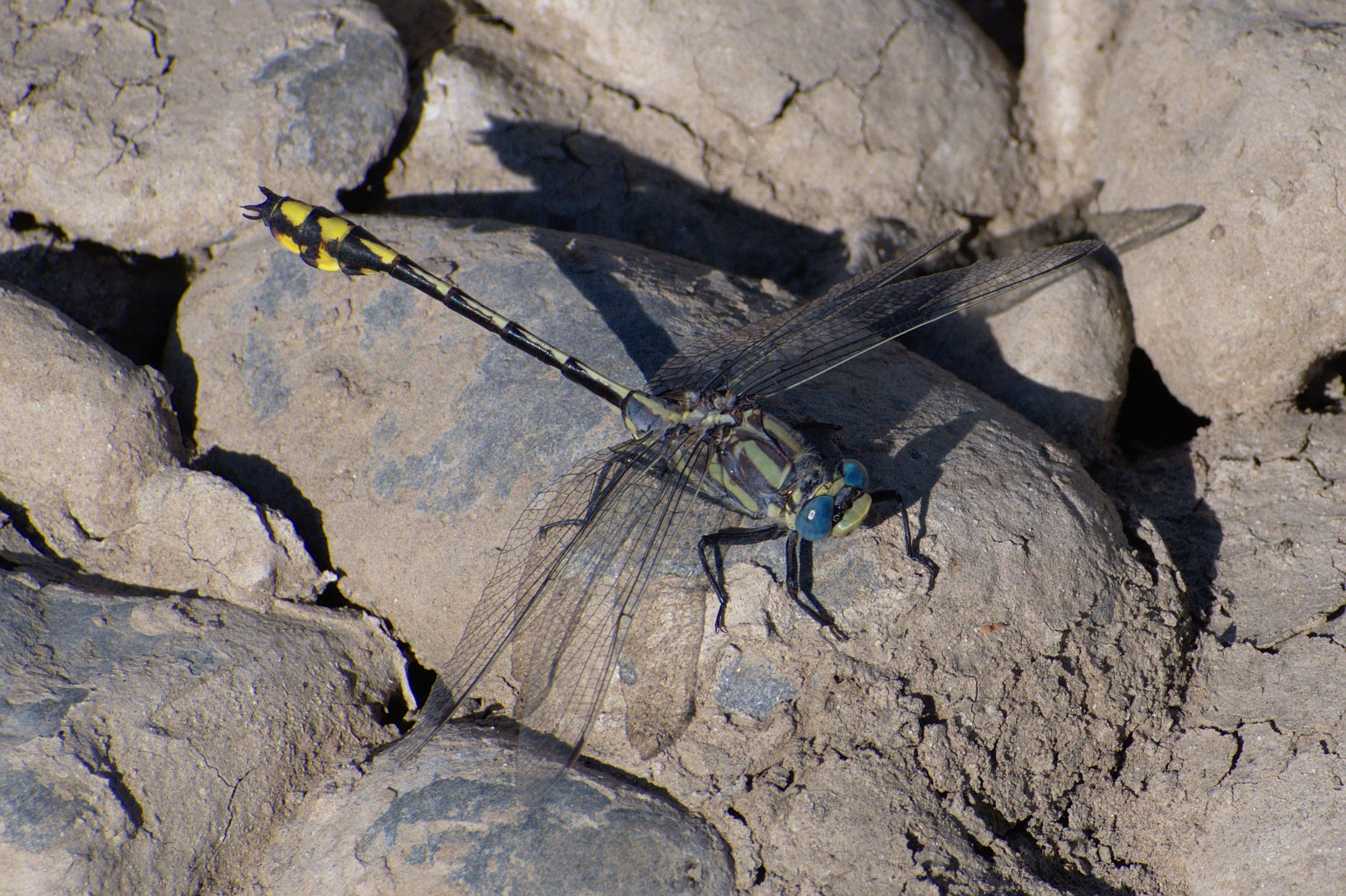

Conservation status
- Least Concern (IUCN 3.1)

Scientific classification
- Kingdom: Animalia
- Phylum: Arthropoda
- Class: Insecta
- Order: Odonata
- Infraorder: Anisoptera
- Family: Gomphidae
- Genus: Gomphurus
- Species: G. lynnae

Binomial name
- Gomphurus lynnae (Paulson, 1983)

Synonyms
- Gomphus lynnae Paulson, 1983

= Gomphurus lynnae =

Species of dragonfly

Gomphurus lynnae, the Columbia clubtail, is a species of clubtail dragonfly in the family Gomphidae. It is found in western North America, with most known populations in Columbia River tributaries.

Gomphurus lynnae was recently considered a member of the genus Gomphus, but in 2017 it became a member of the genus Gomphurus when Gomphurus was elevated from subgenus to genus rank.

The IUCN conservation status of Gomphurus lynnae is "LC", least concern, with no immediate threat to the species' survival. The population is stable. The IUCN status was reviewed in 2018. Gomphurus lynnae was considered "rare" or "endangered" from 1990 to 2007, but was assessed as "least concern" in 2016 after discoveries of populations in New Mexico and Nevada, and additional populations in tributaries of the Columbia River.
