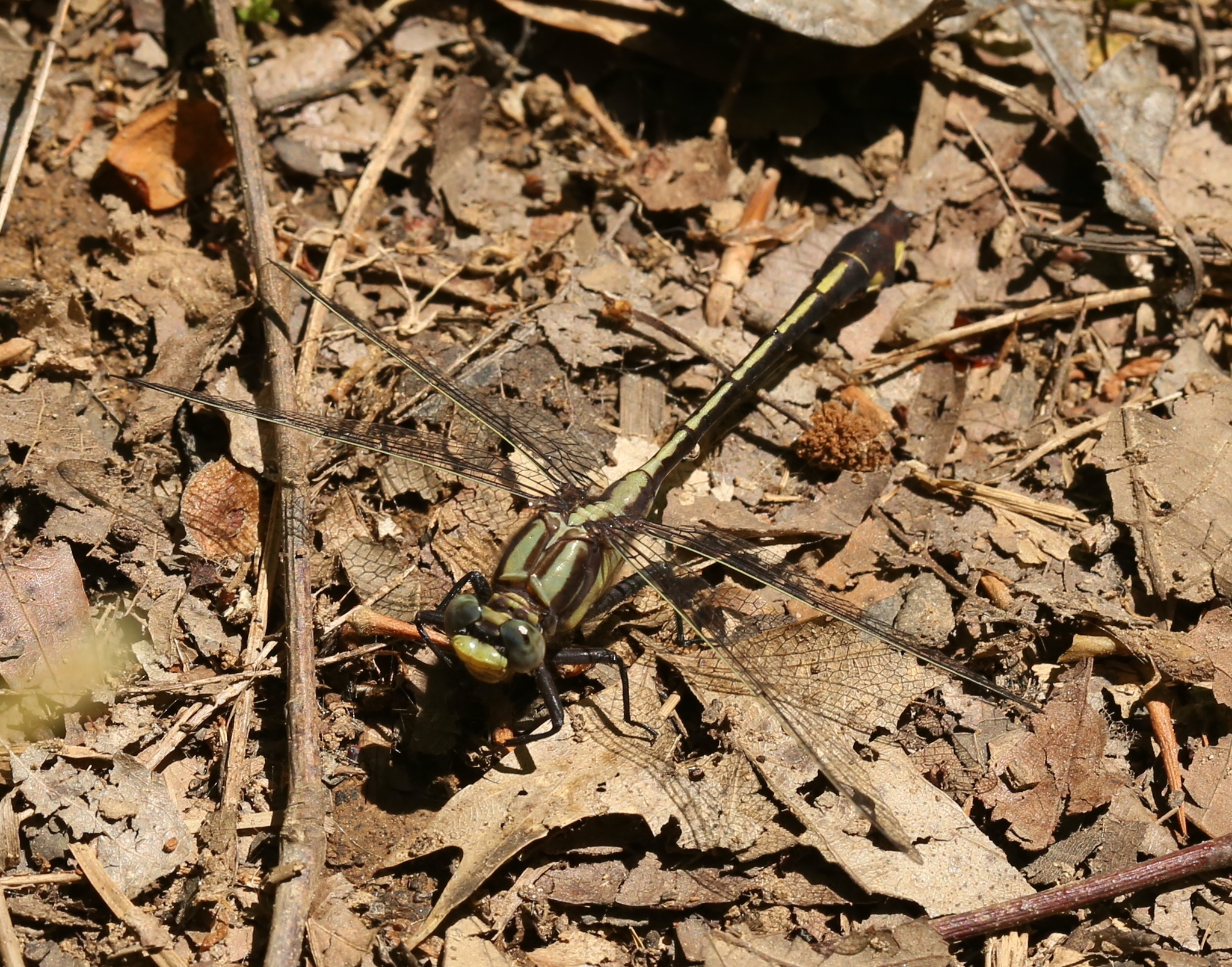

Conservation status
- Least Concern (IUCN 3.1)

Scientific classification
- Kingdom: Animalia
- Phylum: Arthropoda
- Class: Insecta
- Order: Odonata
- Infraorder: Anisoptera
- Family: Gomphidae
- Genus: Gomphurus
- Species: G. septima

Binomial name
- Gomphurus septima (Westfall, 1956)

= Gomphurus septima =

Species of dragonfly

Gomphurus septima, or Septima's clubtail, is a species of clubtail dragonflies in the family Gomphidae.

The IUCN conservation status of Gomphurus septima is "LC", least concern, with no immediate threat to the species' survival. The population is stable. The IUCN status was reviewed in 2018.

Gomphurus septima was recently considered a member of the genus Gomphus, but in 2017 it became a member of the genus Gomphurus when Gomphurus was elevated from subgenus to genus rank.
