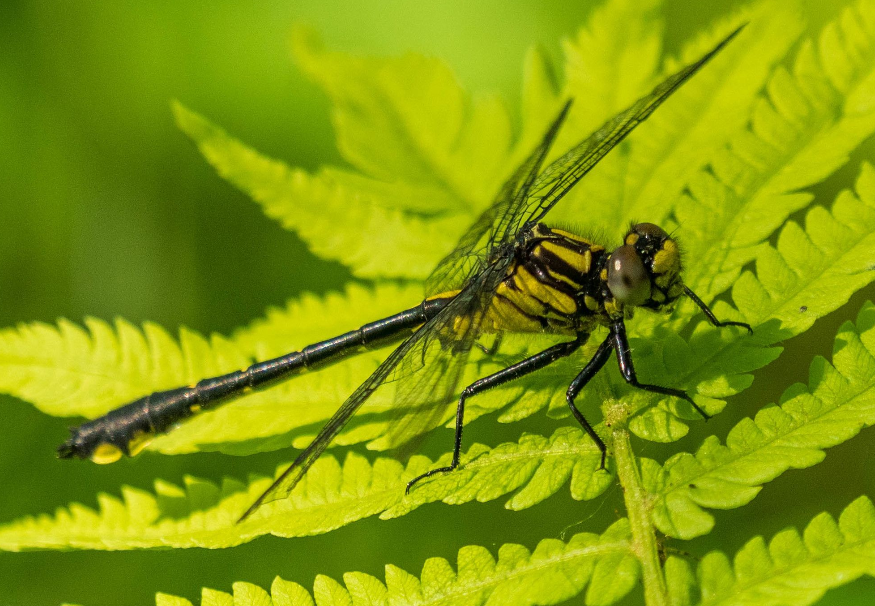

Conservation status
- Least Concern (IUCN 3.1)

Scientific classification
- Kingdom: Animalia
- Phylum: Arthropoda
- Clade: Pancrustacea
- Class: Insecta
- Order: Odonata
- Infraorder: Anisoptera
- Family: Gomphidae
- Genus: Hylogomphus
- Species: H. adelphus

Binomial name
- Hylogomphus adelphus (Sélys, 1858)

= Hylogomphus adelphus =

Species of dragonfly

Hylogomphus adelphus, the mustached clubtail, is a species of dragonfly in the family Gomphidae. It is found in south-eastern Canada and the eastern United States.

Prior to taxonomic revision in 2018, this species was known as Gomphus adelphus.

== Description ==
The mustached clubtail is a black and yellow dragonfly with green or turquoise eyes and characteristically black-marked face. The abdomen has yellow triangles on the upper surface and ends in a moderately wide, mostly black "club". Males and females are similar, although the female has more yellow on the abdomen.

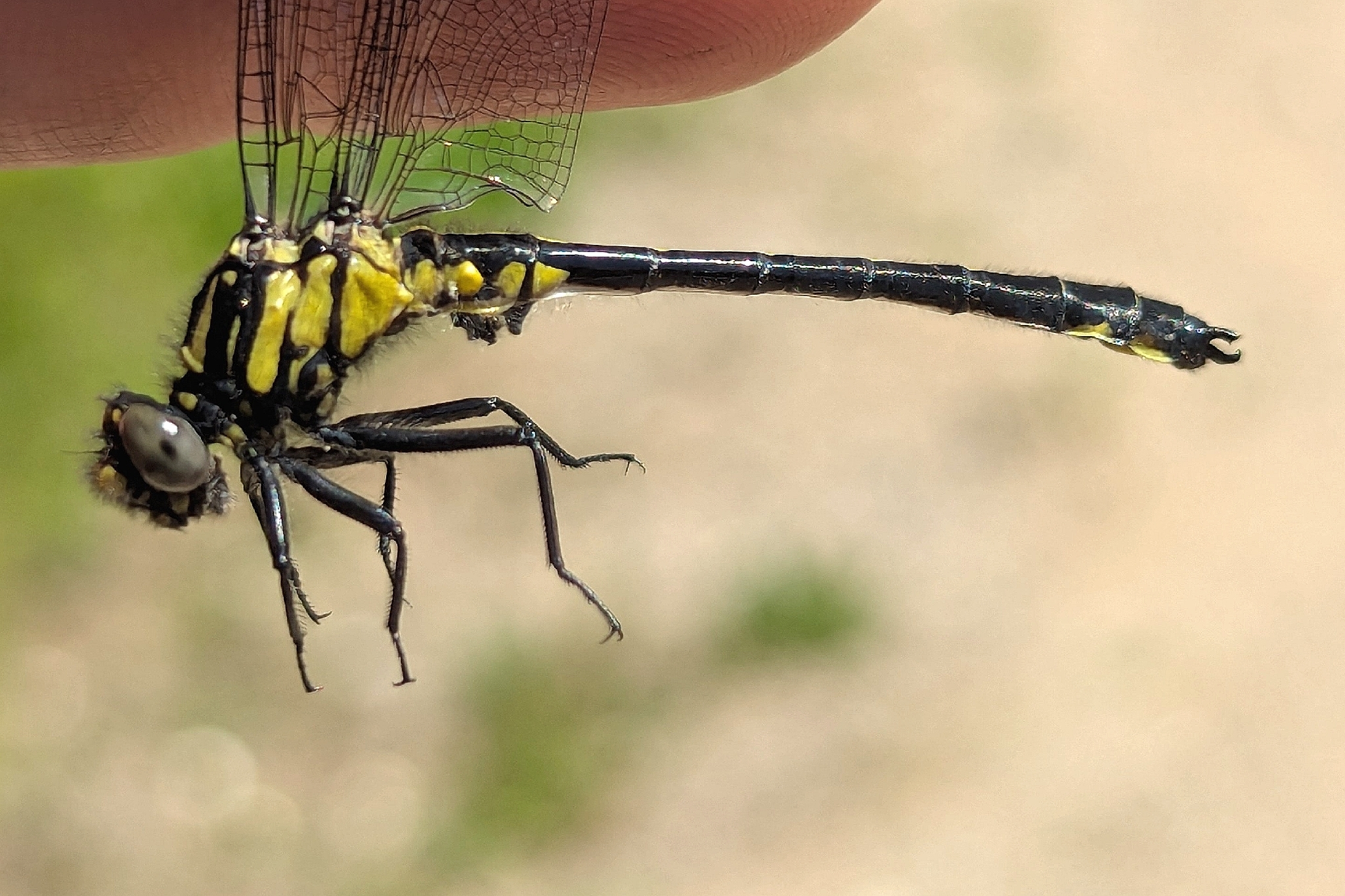
Lateral view

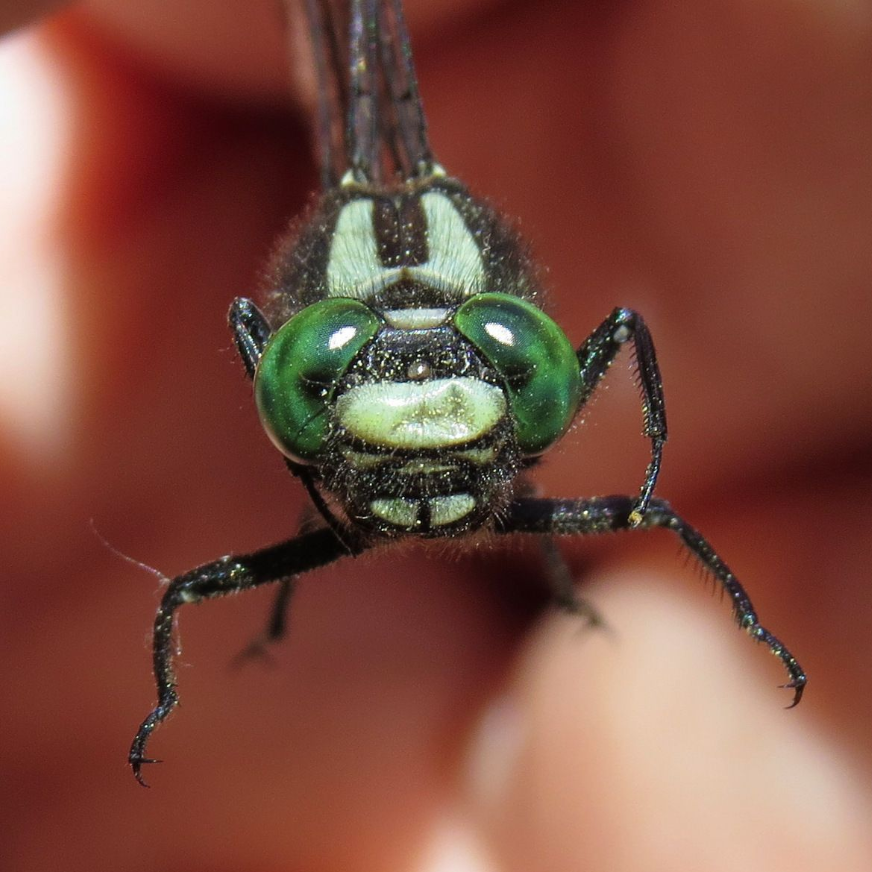
Face, showing the "mustache" marks

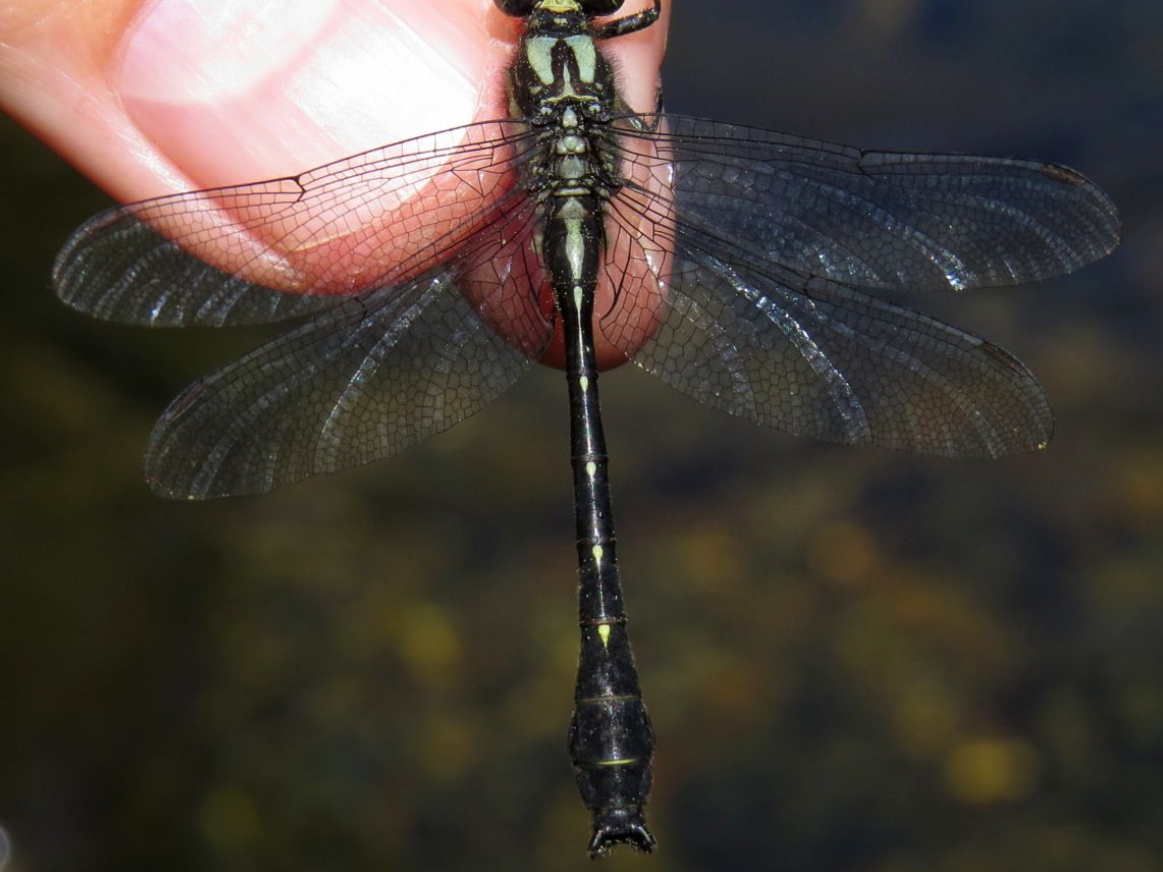
Dorsal view

== Etymology ==
The genus name Hylogomphus comes from hylo ("wood" or "forest") and Gomphus ("bolt" or "nail"). The specific epithet adelphus ("kinsman") is a reference to a presumed relationship with Gomphurus fraternus.

The common name "mustached clubtail" refers to the conspicuous black markings on the face, reminiscent of a mustache.

== Behavior ==
This species is most active in the afternoon. It perches on rocks and overhanging plants along the edges of rivers and can also be found away from the water in nearby sunny clearings.

== Distribution ==
The mustached clubtail can be found from the southern Appalachians north to Nova Scotia, west into Ontario, and south into Wisconsin and Michigan.

== Habitat ==
Mustached clubtails inhabit streams and rivers with a variety of flow, often with rocky riffles. They may also inhabit lakes with suitable shoreline.
