= Gomphurus modestus =

Conservation status
- Least Concern (IUCN 3.1)

Scientific classification
- Kingdom: Animalia
- Phylum: Arthropoda
- Class: Insecta
- Order: Odonata
- Infraorder: Anisoptera
- Family: Gomphidae
- Genus: Gomphurus
- Species: G. modestus

Binomial name
- Gomphurus modestus (Needham, 1942)

Synonyms
- Gomphus modestus Needham, 1942

Species of dragonfly

Gomphurus modestus, the Gulf Coast clubtail, is a species of dragonfly in the family Gomphidae. It is endemic to the southeastern United States, and is found in medium to large, slow-flowing rivers over rock, mud and sand substrates.

This species was formerly a member of the genus Gomphus. It is now considered to be a member of the genus Gomphurus, after that name was elevated in rank from subgenus in 2017.

The IUCN conservation status of Gomphurus modestus is "LC", least concern, with no immediate threat to the species' survival. The population is stable. The IUCN status was reviewed on 5 May 2016.
