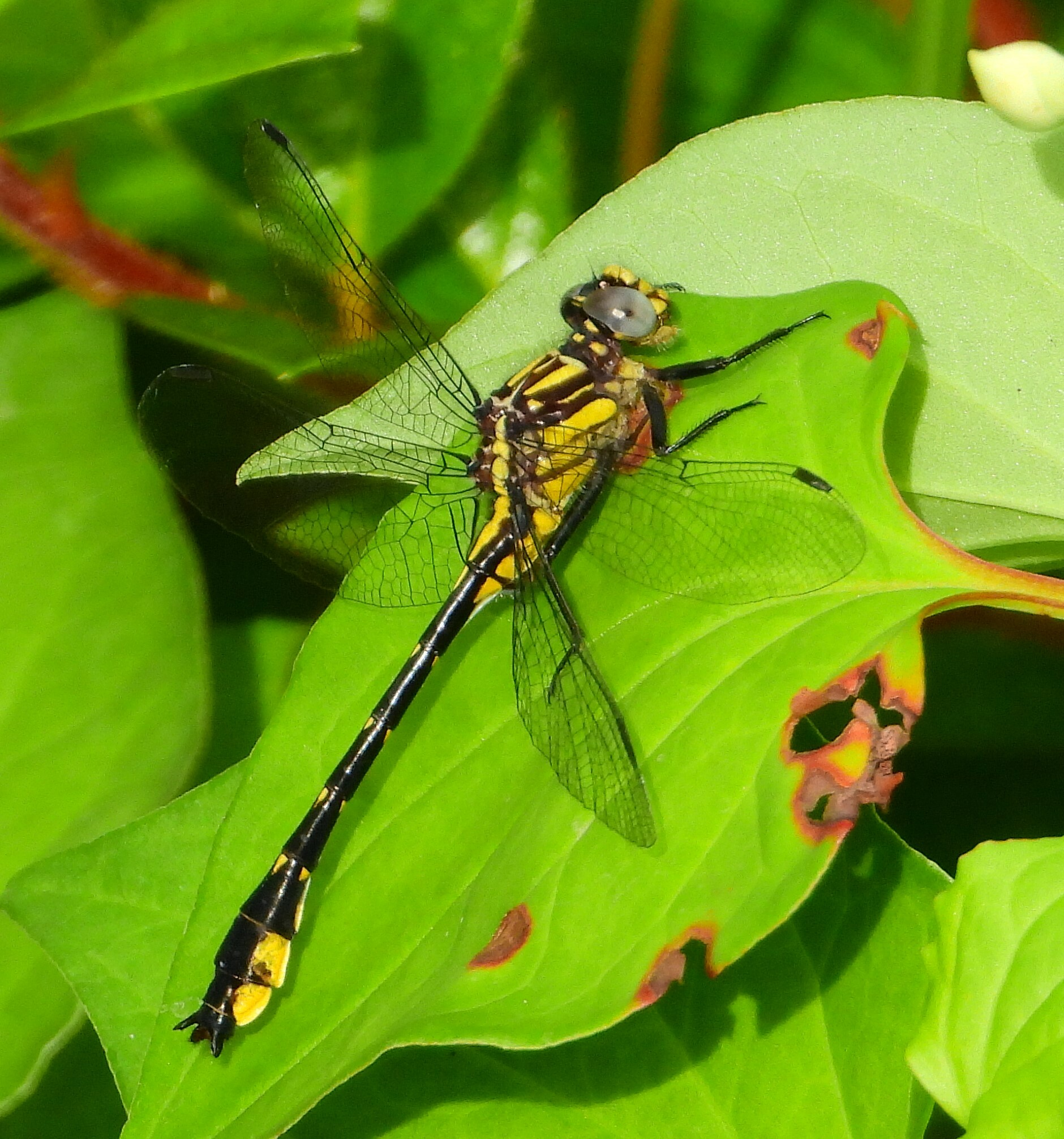

Conservation status
- Least Concern (IUCN 3.1)

Scientific classification
- Kingdom: Animalia
- Phylum: Arthropoda
- Class: Insecta
- Order: Odonata
- Infraorder: Anisoptera
- Family: Gomphidae
- Genus: Hylogomphus
- Species: H. parvidens

Binomial name
- Hylogomphus parvidens (Currie, 1917)

= Hylogomphus parvidens =

Species of dragonfly

Hylogomphus parvidens, the Piedmont clubtail, is a species of clubtail dragonflies in the family Gomphidae. It is found in the southeastern United States.

Hylogomphus parvidens was recently considered a member of the genus Gomphus, but in 2017 it became a member of the genus Hylogomphus when Hylogomphus was elevated from subgenus to genus rank.

The IUCN conservation status of Hylogomphus parvidens is "LC", least concern, with no immediate threat to the species' survival. The population is stable. The IUCN status was reviewed in 2018. Hylogomphus parvidens was assessed "rare" from 1986 to 1994, "lower risk / near threatened" in 1996, and "least concern" in 2006 and 2017.
