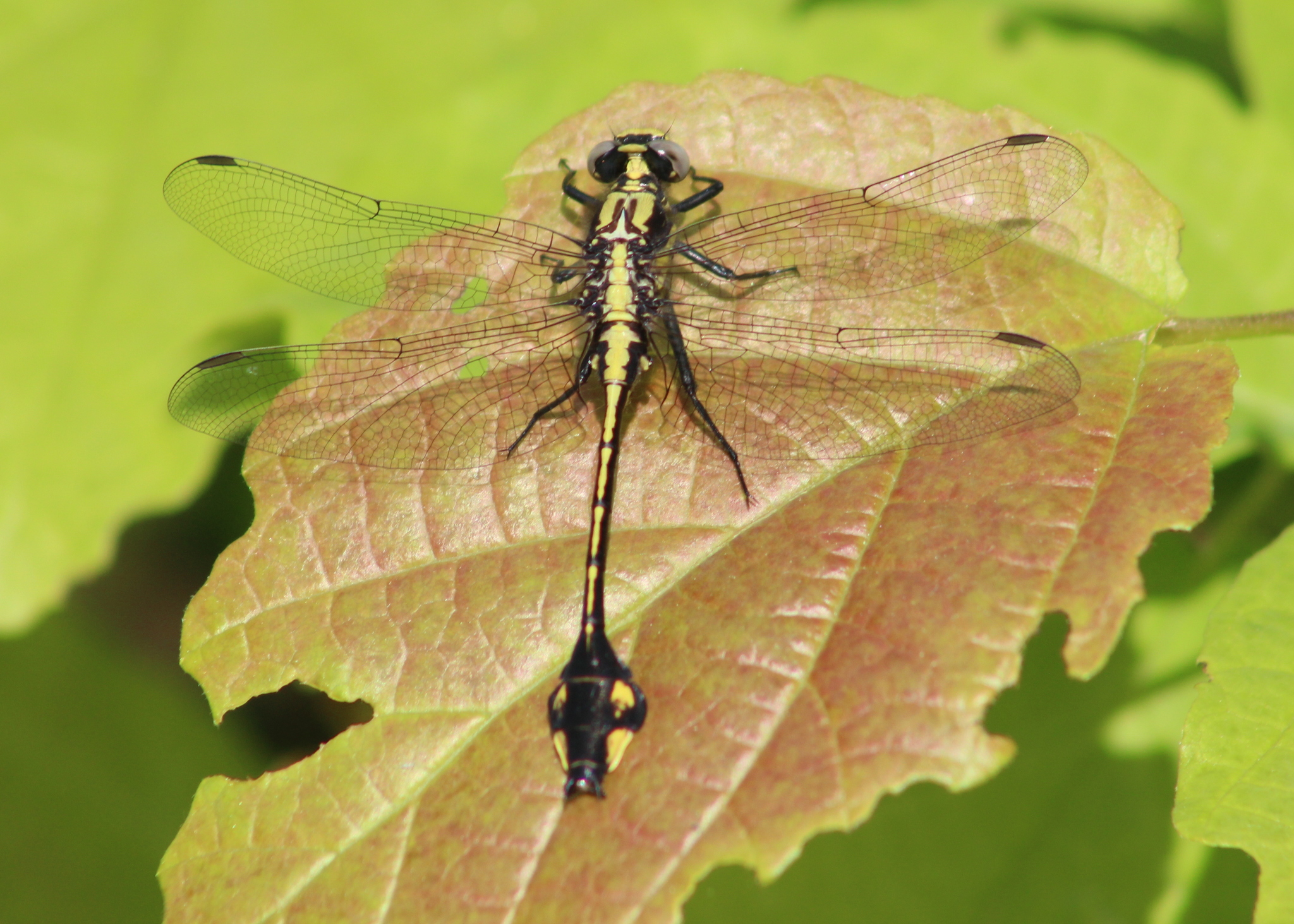

Conservation status
- Least Concern (IUCN 3.1)

Scientific classification
- Kingdom: Animalia
- Phylum: Arthropoda
- Clade: Pancrustacea
- Class: Insecta
- Order: Odonata
- Infraorder: Anisoptera
- Family: Gomphidae
- Genus: Gomphurus
- Species: G. ventricosus

Binomial name
- Gomphurus ventricosus (Walsh, 1863)

= Gomphurus ventricosus =

Species of dragonfly

Gomphurus ventricosus, the skillet clubtail, is a species of dragonfly in the family Gomphidae. It is found in south-eastern Canada and northeastern United States. It is considered rare across its range.

Prior to taxonomic revision in 2018, this species was known as Gomphus ventricosus.

== Description ==
The skillet clubtail is a black and yellow dragonfly with green to turquoise eyes and unmarked face. The abdomen has longitudinal yellow stripes and ends in a distinctively wide yellow-spotted "club". Males and females are similar, although the female's club is somewhat smaller.

The club on this species is wider than its thorax and comparatively the widest of any clubtail.

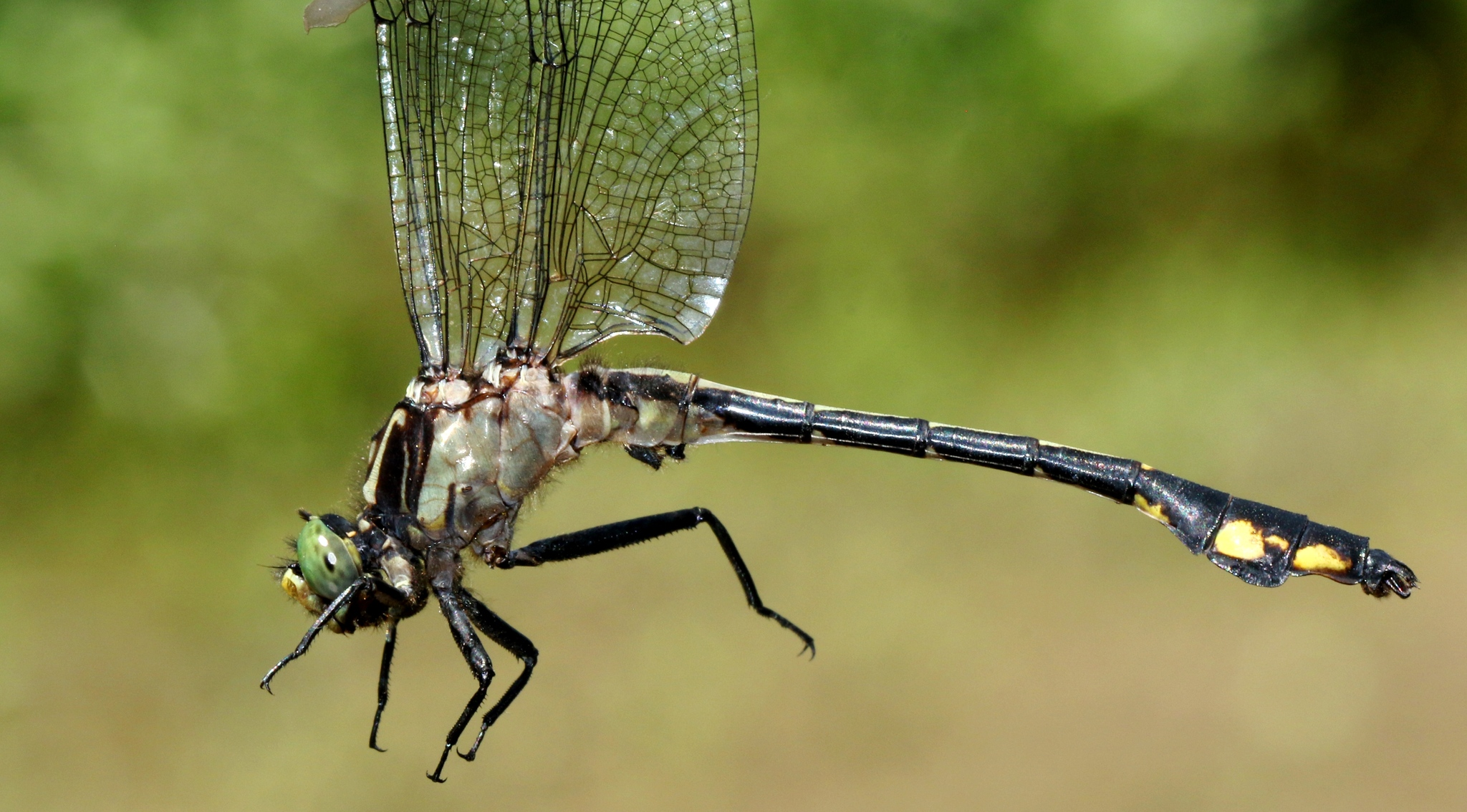
Lateral view

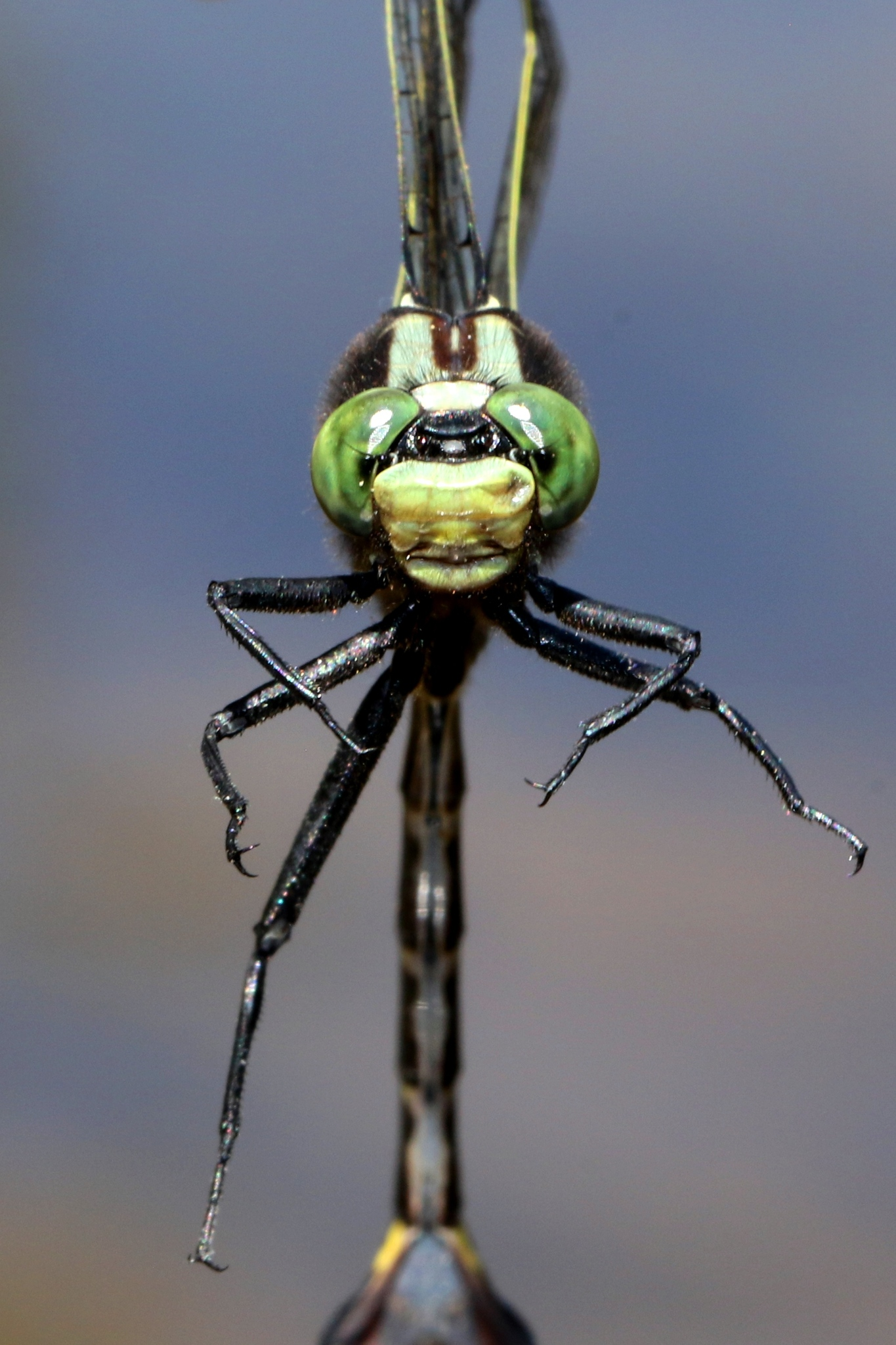
Face

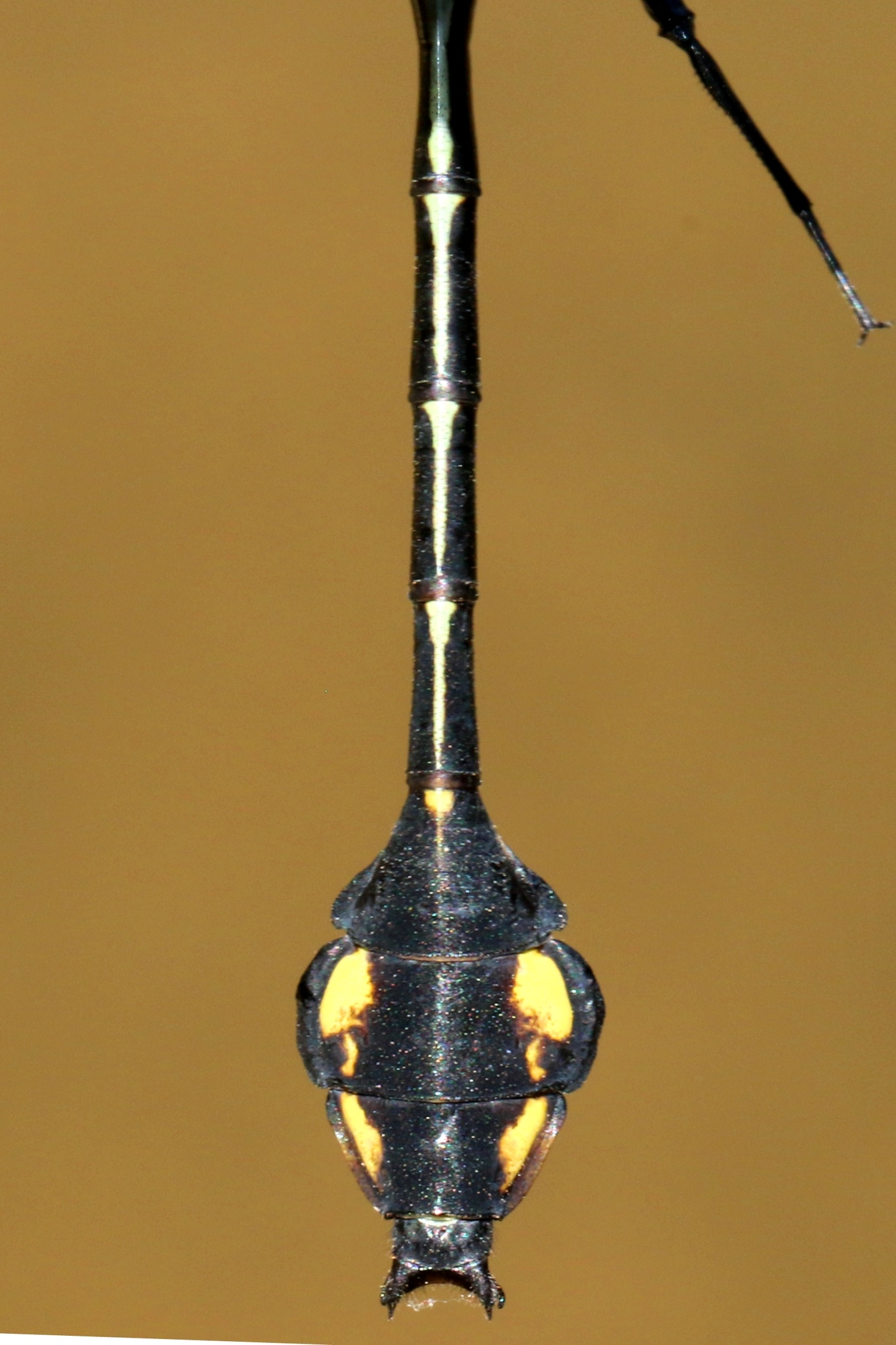
Club

Exuviae are unpatterned, with granular surface, and 28–29 millimetres (1.1–1.1 in) long.

== Etymology ==
The genus name Gomphurus comes from Gomphus ("bolt" or "nail") and "tail", referring to the wide clubs in this genus. The specific epithet ventricosus ("paunch", "bloated") probably a reference to the remarkably wide club of this species.

The common name "skillet clubtail" is similar, with the thin abdomen and wide club looking like a frying pan.

== Behavior ==
Males make short flights over the water, returning to perch in inconspicuous places. It also feeds in weedy fields near breeding habitat.

== Distribution ==
The skillet clubtail can be found from Kentucky and Virginia north to Minnesota, Michigan, and Vermont. Its range also includes small areas in southern Ontario, Quebec, New Brunswick, and Nova Scotia.

== Habitat ==
Skillet clubtails inhabit large pristine rocky rivers with fine sediment, usually slow to moderate current.
