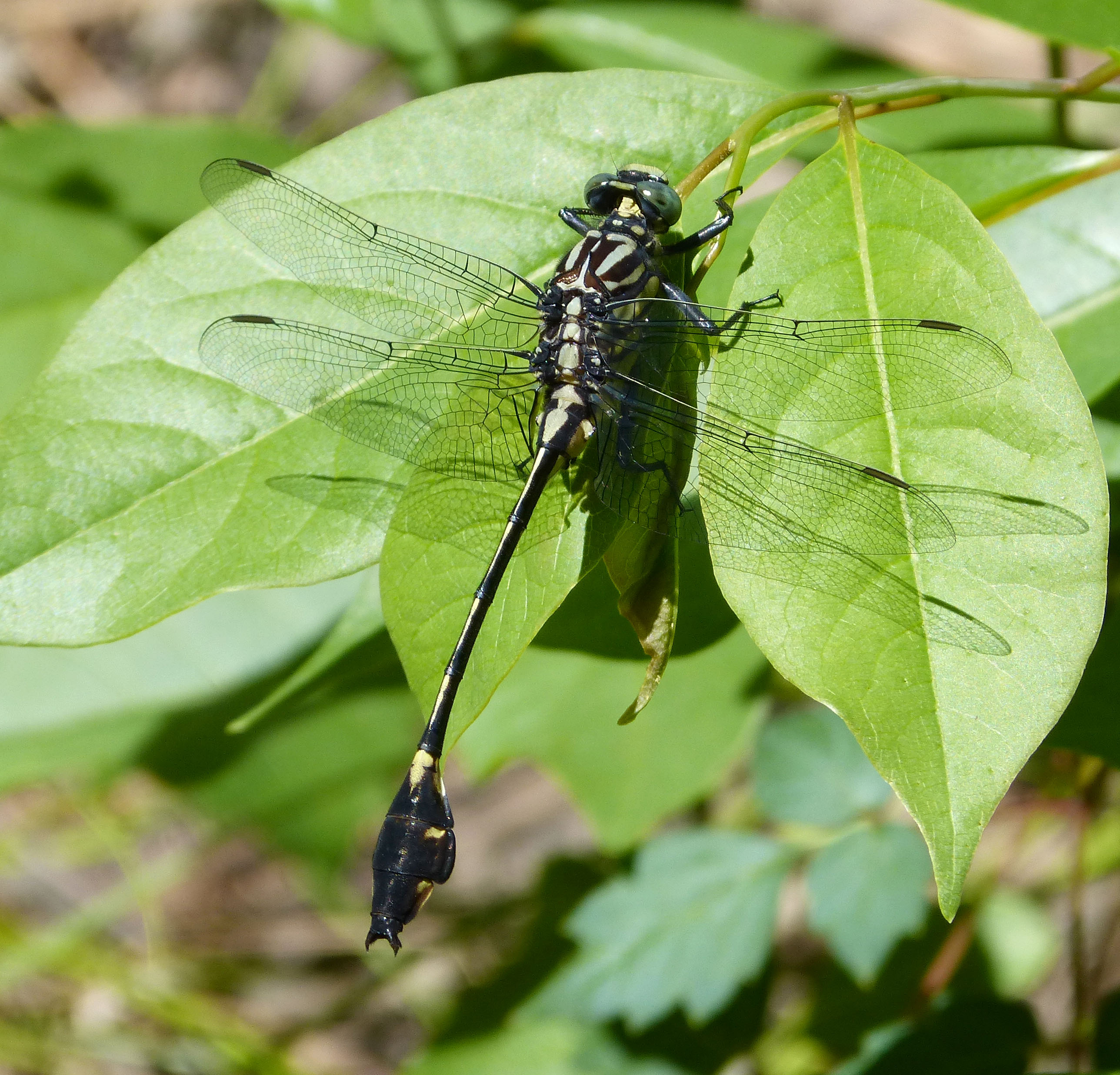
- Blackwater clubtail, Gomphurus dilatatus

Scientific classification
- Domain: Eukaryota
- Kingdom: Animalia
- Phylum: Arthropoda
- Class: Insecta
- Order: Odonata
- Infraorder: Anisoptera
- Family: Gomphidae
- Genus: Gomphurus; Needham, 1901

= Gomphurus =

Genus of dragonflies

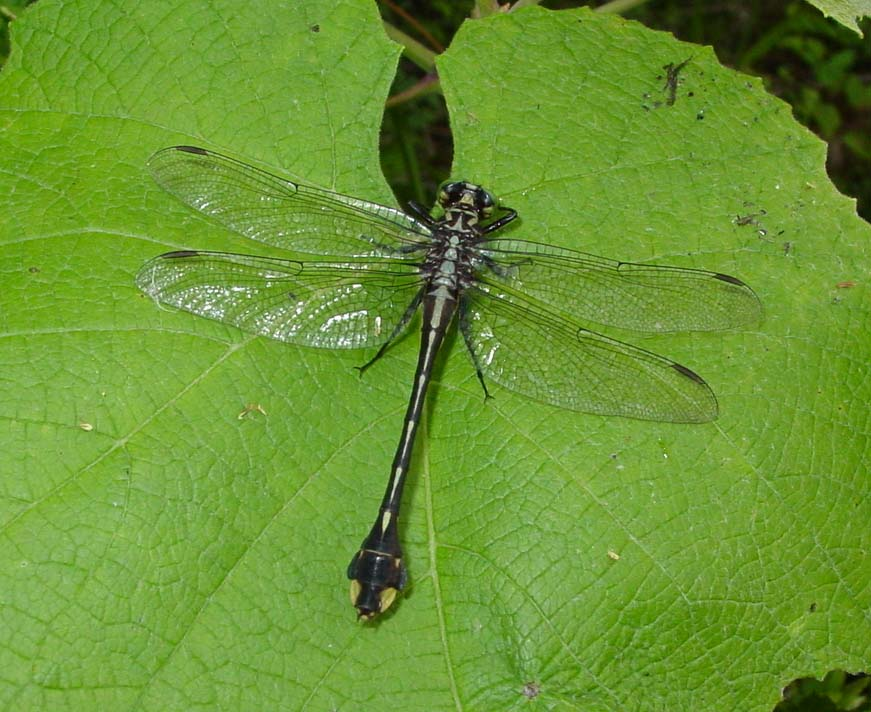
Gomphus vastus, cobra clubtail

Gomphurus is a genus of clubtails in the family of dragonflies known as Gomphidae. There are about 13 described species in Gomphurus.

Gomphurus was formerly considered a subgenus of Gomphus, but has recently been promoted to genus rank along with Phanogomphus, Stenogomphurus and Hylogomphus.

== Species ==
These 13 species belong to the genus Gomphurus:

- Gomphurus crassus (Hagen in Selys, 1878) (handsome clubtail)
- Gomphurus dilatatus (Rambur, 1842) (blackwater clubtail)
- Gomphurus externus (Hagen in Selys, 1858) (plains clubtail)
- Gomphurus fraternus (Say, 1840) (midland clubtail)
- Gomphurus gonzalezi (Dunkle, 1992) (Tamaulipan clubtail)
- Gomphurus hybridus (Williamson, 1902) (cocoa clubtail)
- Gomphurus lineatifrons (Calvert, 1921) (splendid clubtail)
- Gomphurus lynnae (Paulson, 1983) (Columbia clubtail)
- Gomphurus modestus (Needham, 1942) (gulf coast clubtail)
- Gomphurus ozarkensis (Westfall, 1975) (Ozark clubtail)
- Gomphurus septima (Westfall, 1956) (Septima's clubtail)
- Gomphurus vastus (Walsh, 1862) (cobra clubtail)
- Gomphurus ventricosus (Walsh, 1863) (skillet clubtail)
