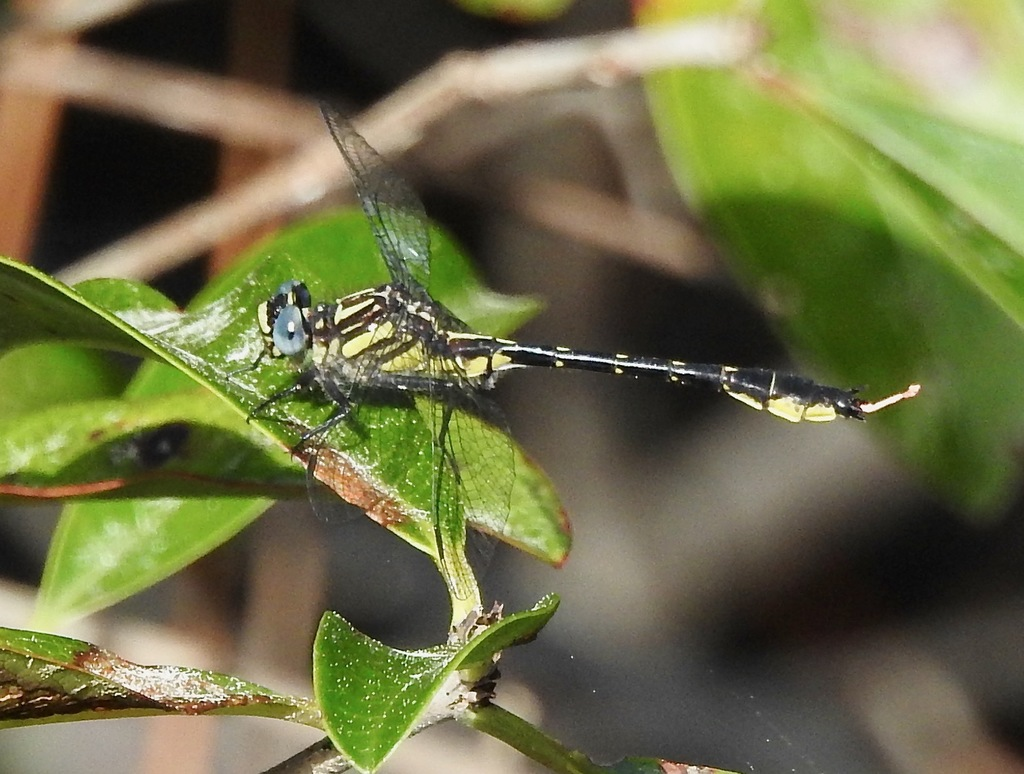

Conservation status
- Least Concern (IUCN 3.1)

Scientific classification
- Kingdom: Animalia
- Phylum: Arthropoda
- Class: Insecta
- Order: Odonata
- Infraorder: Anisoptera
- Family: Gomphidae
- Genus: Hylogomphus
- Species: H. geminatus

Binomial name
- Hylogomphus geminatus (Carle, 1979)

Synonyms
- Gomphus geminatus Carle, 1979

= Hylogomphus geminatus =

Species of dragonfly

Hylogomphus geminatus, the twin-striped clubtail, is a species of dragonfly in the family Gomphidae. It is endemic to the southeastern United States, and is found in small rivers and streams.

Hylogomphus geminatus was recently considered a member of the genus Gomphus, but in 2017 it became a member of the genus Hylogomphus when Hylogomphus was elevated from subgenus to genus rank.

The IUCN conservation status of Hylogomphus geminatus is "LC", least concern, with no immediate threat to the species' survival. The population is stable. The IUCN status was reviewed in 2018. From 1986 to 1994 the species was assessed as "rare", was "lower risk/near threatened" in 1996, and "near threatened" in 2007. Hylogomphus geminatus has been found in about 20 locations in four states, each with a population of hundreds to thousands.
