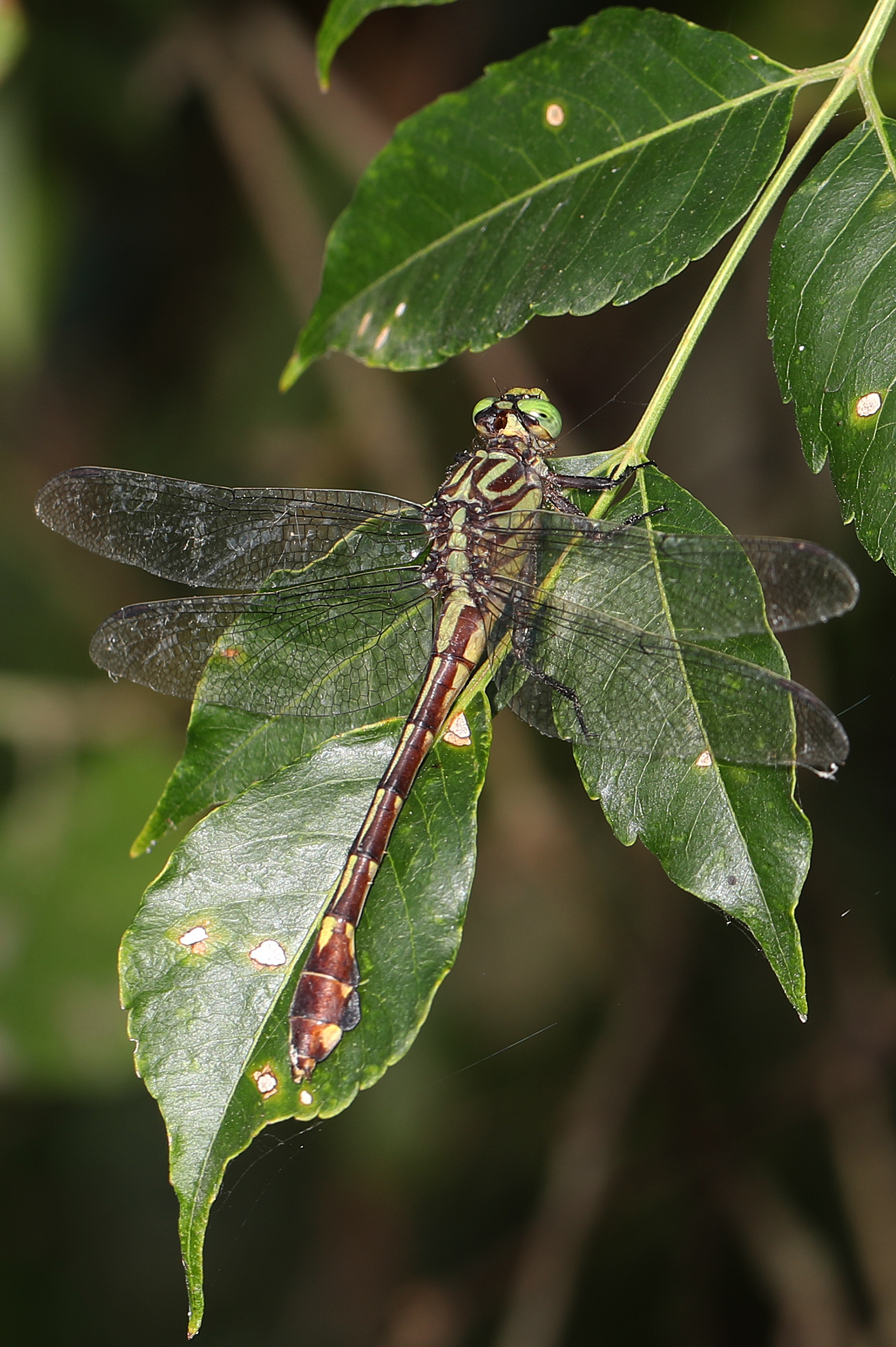
- In Texas

Conservation status
- Least Concern (IUCN 3.1)

Scientific classification
- Kingdom: Animalia
- Phylum: Arthropoda
- Class: Insecta
- Order: Odonata
- Infraorder: Anisoptera
- Family: Gomphidae
- Genus: Gomphurus
- Species: G. vastus

Binomial name
- Gomphurus vastus (Walsh, 1862)

= Gomphurus vastus =

Species of dragonfly

Gomphurus vastus, the cobra clubtail, is a species of clubtail in the dragonfly family Gomphidae, found in the eastern United States.

The IUCN Red List conservation status of Gomphurus vastus is "Least Concern", with no immediate threat to the species' survival.
