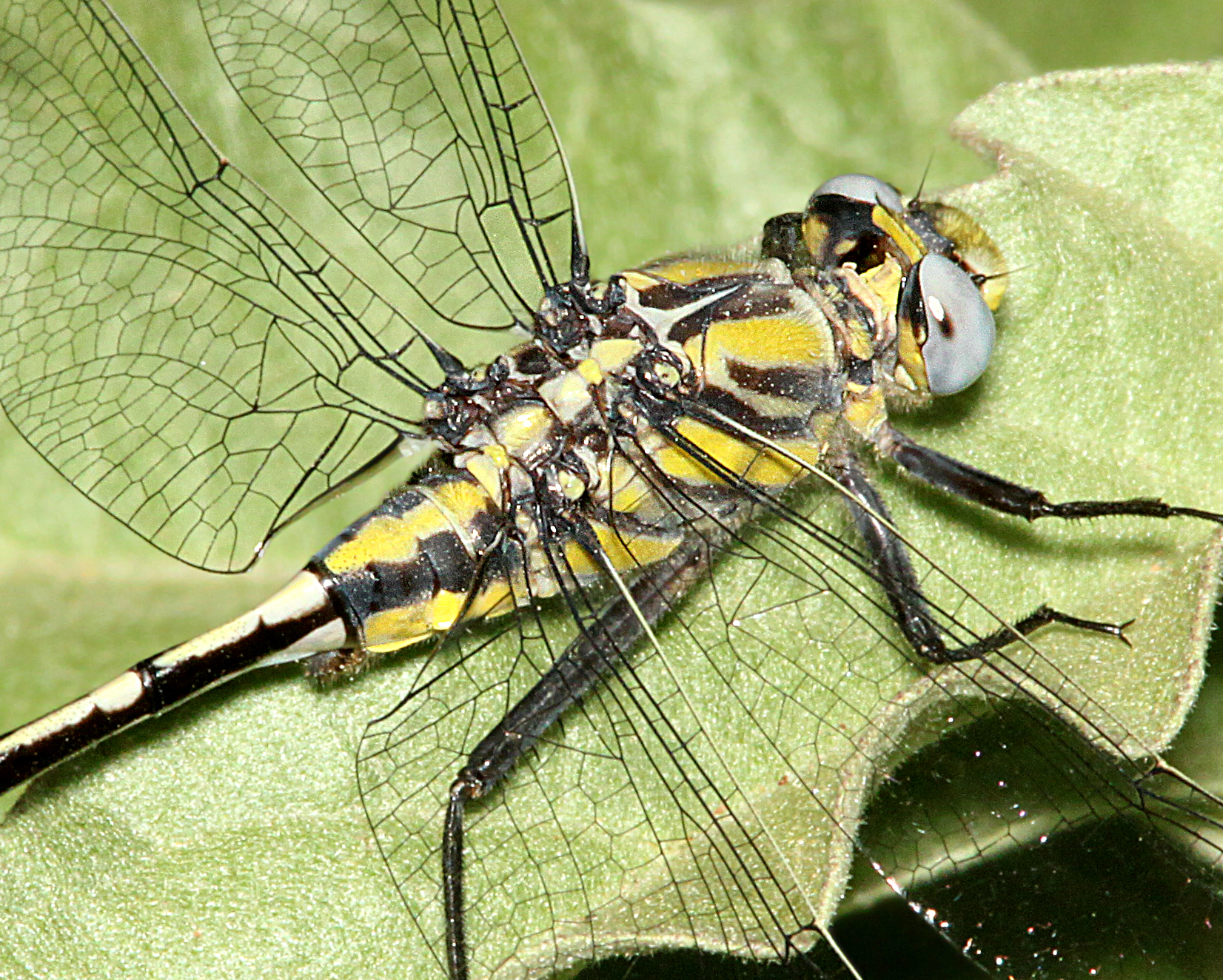

Conservation status
- Data Deficient (IUCN 3.1)

Scientific classification
- Kingdom: Animalia
- Phylum: Arthropoda
- Class: Insecta
- Order: Odonata
- Infraorder: Anisoptera
- Family: Gomphidae
- Genus: Gomphurus
- Species: G. gonzalezi

Binomial name
- Gomphurus gonzalezi (Dunkle, 1992)

= Gomphurus gonzalezi =

Species of dragonfly

Gomphurus gonzalezi, the Tamaulipan clubtail, is a species of clubtail in the family of dragonflies known as Gomphidae. It is found along the lower Rio Grande in the United States, and across the border into Mexico. It is known only in one state in the United States (Texas) and one state in Mexico (San Luis Potosí).

Hylogomphus geminatus was recently considered a member of the genus Gomphus, but in 2017 it became a member of the genus Gomphurus when Gomphurus was elevated from subgenus to genus rank.
